= Tony Award for Best Scenic Design in a Musical =

Award for outstanding set design for musicals

Tony Award for Best Scenic Design of a Musical
- Awarded for: Best Scenic Design of a Musical
- Location: United States New York City
- Presented by: American Theatre Wing The Broadway League
- Currently held by: Dane Laffrey for The Lost Boys (2026)
- Website: TonyAwards.com

Tony Award for Best Scenic Design in a Musical is an award for outstanding set design of a musical. The award was first presented in 1960 after the category of Best Scenic Design was divided into Scenic Design in a Play and Scenic Design in a Musical with each genre receiving its own award. Between 1962 and 2004, the award was re-combined to Best Scenic Design before being split again in 2005.

== Winners and nominees ==
indicates the winner

=== 1960s ===
Year	Production	Nominees
1960 (14th)
1960 (14th)	The Sound of Music	Oliver Smith
1960 (14th)	Fiorello!	William & Jean Eckart
1960 (14th)	Greenwillow	Peter Larkin
1960 (14th)	Gypsy	Jo Mielziner
1960 (14th)	Saratoga	Cecil Beaton
1961 (15th)
1961 (15th)	Camelot	Oliver Smith
1961 (15th)	13 Daughters	George C. Jenkins
1961 (15th)	Bye Bye Birdie	Robert Randolph

=== 2000s ===
Year	Production	Nominees
2005 (59th)
2005 (59th)	The Light in the Piazza	Michael Yeargan
2005 (59th)	Chitty Chitty Bang Bang	Anthony Ward
2005 (59th)	Monty Python's Spamalot	Tim Hatley
2005 (59th)	Pacific Overtures	Rumi Matsui
2006 (60th)
2006 (60th)	The Drowsy Chaperone	David Gallo
2006 (60th)	The Color Purple	John Lee Beatty
2006 (60th)	Jersey Boys	Klara Zieglerova
2006 (60th)	The Pajama Game	Derek McLane
2007 (61st)
2007 (61st)	Mary Poppins	Bob Crowley
2007 (61st)	Grey Gardens	Allen Moyer
2007 (61st)	High Fidelity	Anna Louizos
2007 (61st)	Spring Awakening	Christine Jones
2008 (62nd)
2008 (62nd)	South Pacific	Michael Yeargan
2008 (62nd)	In the Heights	Anna Louizos
2008 (62nd)	Sunday in the Park with George	Timothy Bird, David Farley and The Knifedge Creative Network
2008 (62nd)	The New Mel Brooks Musical Young Frankenstein	Robin Wagner
2009 (63rd)
2009 (63rd)	Billy Elliot the Musical	Ian MacNeil
2009 (63rd)	Guys and Dolls	Robert Brill
2009 (63rd)	Next to Normal	Mark Wendland
2009 (63rd)	Pal Joey	Scott Pask

=== 2010s ===
Year	Production	Nominees
2010 (64th)
2010 (64th)	American Idiot	Christine Jones
2010 (64th)	Fela!	Marina Draghici
2010 (64th)	La Cage aux Folles	Tim Shortall
2010 (64th)	Ragtime	Derek McLane
2011 (65th)
2011 (65th)	The Book of Mormon	Scott Pask
2011 (65th)	Anything Goes	Derek McLane
2011 (65th)	Bloody Bloody Andrew Jackson	Donyale Werle
2011 (65th)	The Scottsboro Boys	Beowulf Boritt
2012 (66th)
2012 (66th)	Once	Bob Crowley
2012 (66th)	Ghost the Musical	Jon Driscoll and Rob Howell
2012 (66th)	Newsies	Sven Ortel and Tobin Ost
2012 (66th)	Spider-Man: Turn Off the Dark	George Tsypin
2013 (67th)
2013 (67th)	Matilda the Musical	Rob Howell
2013 (67th)	Kinky Boots	David Rockwell
2013 (67th)	The Mystery of Edwin Drood	Anna Louizos
2013 (67th)	Pippin	Scott Pask
2014 (68th)
2014 (68th)	Rocky the Musical	Christopher Barreca
2014 (68th)	Bullets Over Broadway	Santo Loquasto
2014 (68th)	A Gentleman's Guide to Love and Murder	Alexander Dodge
2014 (68th)	Hedwig and the Angry Inch	Julian Crouch
2015 (69th)
2015 (69th)	An American in Paris	Bob Crowley and 59 Productions
2015 (69th)	Fun Home	David Zinn
2015 (69th)	The King and I	Michael Yeargan
2015 (69th)	On the Twentieth Century	David Rockwell
2016 (70th)
2016 (70th)	She Loves Me	David Rockwell
2016 (70th)	American Psycho	Es Devlin and Finn Ross
2016 (70th)	Hamilton	David Korins
2016 (70th)	Shuffle Along, or, the Making of the Musical Sensation of 1921 and All That Followed	Santo Loquasto
2017 (71st)
2017 (71st)	Natasha, Pierre & The Great Comet of 1812	Mimi Lien
2017 (71st)	Groundhog Day	Rob Howell
2017 (71st)	Hello, Dolly!	Santo Loquasto
2017 (71st)	War Paint	David Korins
2018 (72nd)
2018 (72nd)	SpongeBob SquarePants	David Zinn
2018 (72nd)	The Band's Visit	Scott Pask
2018 (72nd)	Mean Girls	Scott Pask, Finn Ross and Adam Young
2018 (72nd)	My Fair Lady	Michael Yeargan
2018 (72nd)	Once on This Island	Dane Laffrey
2019 (73rd)
2019 (73rd)	Hadestown	Rachel Hauck
2019 (73rd)	Ain’t Too Proud	Robert Brill and Peter Nigrini
2019 (73rd)	Beetlejuice	David Korins
2019 (73rd)	King Kong	Peter England
2019 (73rd)	Oklahoma!	Laura Jellinek

=== 2020s ===
Year	Production	Nominees
2020 (74th)
2020 (74th)	Moulin Rouge! The Musical	Derek McLane
2020 (74th)	Jagged Little Pill	Riccardo Hernández and Lucy Mackinnon
2020 (74th)	Tina: The Tina Turner Musical	Mark Thompson and Jeff Sugg
2022 (75th)
2022 (75th)	Company	Bunny Christie
2022 (75th)	Flying Over Sunset	Beowulf Boritt and 59 Productions
2022 (75th)	MJ	Derek McLane and Peter Nigrini
2022 (75th)	Paradise Square	Allen Moyer
2022 (75th)	A Strange Loop	Arnulfo Maldonado
2023 (76th)
2023 (76th)	New York, New York	Beowulf Boritt
2023 (76th)	Camelot	Michael Yeargan and 59 Productions
2023 (76th)	Shucked	Scott Pask
2023 (76th)	Some Like It Hot	Scott Pask
2023 (76th)	Sweeney Todd: The Demon Barber of Fleet Street	Mimi Lien
2024 (77th)
2024 (77th)	Cabaret at the Kit Kat Club	Tom Scutt
2024 (77th)	Back to the Future: The Musical	Tim Hatley and Finn Ross
2024 (77th)	Hell's Kitchen	Robert Brill and Peter Nigrini
2024 (77th)	Here Lies Love	David Korins
2024 (77th)	Lempicka	Riccardo Hernández and Peter Nigrini
2024 (77th)	The Outsiders	AMP featuring Tatiana Kahvegian
2024 (77th)	Water for Elephants	Takeshi Kata
2025 (78th)
2025 (78th)	Maybe Happy Ending	Dane Laffrey and George Reeve
2025 (78th)	Buena Vista Social Club	Arnulfo Maldonado
2025 (78th)	Death Becomes Her	Derek McLane
2025 (78th)	Just in Time	Derek McLane
2025 (78th)	Swept Away	Rachel Hauck
2026 (79th)
2026 (79th)	The Lost Boys	Dane Laffrey
2026 (79th)	Cats: The Jellicle Ball	Rachel Hauck
2026 (79th)	The Rocky Horror Show	dots
2026 (79th)	Schmigadoon!	Scott Pask
2026 (79th)	Two Strangers (Carry a Cake Across New York)	Soutra Gilmour

== Multiple wins ==
3 wins

- Bob Crowley

2 wins

- Dane Laffrey
- Oliver Smith
- Michael Yeargan

== Multiple nominations ==
8 nominations

- Scott Pask

7 nominations

- Derek McLane

5 nominations

- Michael Yeargan

4 nominations

- David Korins
- Peter Nigrini

3 nominations

- 59 Productions
- Beowulf Boritt
- Robert Brill
- Bob Crowley
- Rachel Hauck
- Rob Howell
- Dane Laffrey
- Santo Loquasto
- Anna Louizos
- David Rockwell
- Finn Ross

2 nominations

- Tim Hatley
- Riccardo Hernández
- Christine Jones
- Mimi Lien
- Arnulfo Maldonado
- Allen Moyer
- David Zinn

== See also ==
- Tony Award for Best Scenic Design in a Play
- Drama Desk Award for Outstanding Scenic Design of a Musical
- Laurence Olivier Award for Best Set Design
- List of Tony Award-nominated productions
