= Drama Desk Award for Outstanding Scenic Design of a Musical =

Drama Desk Award for Outstanding Scenic Design
- Awarded for: Outstanding Scenic Design of a Musical
- Location: New York City
- Country: United States
- Presented by: Drama Desk
- First award: 1996
- Currently held by: Dane Laffrey and George Reeve for Maybe Happy Ending (2025)
- Website: dramadesk.org (defunct)

The Drama Desk Award for Outstanding Scenic Design for a Musical is an annual award presented by Drama Desk in recognition of achievements in theatre across collective Broadway, off-Broadway and off-off-Broadway productions in New York City.

The award was established in 1969, with the Drama Desk Award for Outstanding Set Design being presented each year to any play or musical production. Starting in 1996, the singular award was replaced by separate play and musical categories, but then merged again from 2010 to 2015; the separate play and musical categories have again co-existed since 2016.

== Winners and nominees ==
=== 1990s ===
Year	Designer	Production
1996
1996	Brian Thomson	The King and I
1996	G.W. Mercier	Bed and Sofa
1996	Christina Poddubiuk, James Noone and Robin Wagner	Big: the musical
1996	Robin Wagner	Victor/Victoria
1997
1997	Robin Phillips	Jekyll & Hyde
1997	Clarke Dunham	Candide
1997	G.W. Mercier and Julie Taymor	Juan Darien
1997	James Morgan	No Way to Treat a Lady
1997	Tony Walton	Steel Pier
1997	Wendall K. Harrington	Steel Pier
1998
1998	Richard Hudson	The Lion King
1998	Robert Brill	Cabaret
1998	Eugene Lee	Ragtime
1998	Wendall K. Harrington	Ragtime
1999
1999	Lez Brotherston	Matthew Bourne's Swan Lake
1999	David Gallo	You're a Good Man, Charlie Brown
1999	Riccardo Hernandez	Parade
1999	G.W. Mercier and Jan Hartley	Dream True

=== 2000s ===
Year	Designer	Production
2000
2000	Robin Wagner	Kiss Me, Kate
2000	Julian Crouch and Graeme Gilmour	Shockheaded Peter
2000	David Gallo	The Wild Party
2000	Thomas Lynch	Contact
2000	Thomas Lynch	The Music Man
2001
2001	Robin Wagner	The Producers
2001	Heidi Ettinger	The Adventures of Tom Sawyer
2001	Richard Hoover and Bryan Johnson	Bat Boy: The Musical
2001	David Rockwell	The Rocky Horror Show
2001	Douglas Schmidt	42nd Street
2002
2002	Douglas Schmidt	Into the Woods
2002	Beowulf Boritt	The Last Five Years
2002	Bob Crowley	Sweet Smell of Success
2002	David Gallo	Thoroughly Modern Millie
2002	Anthony Ward	Oklahoma!
2003
2003	Catherine Martin	La Bohème
2003	Riccardo Hernandez	Radiant Baby
2003	Scott Pask	Amour
2003	David Rockwell	Hairspray
2003	Stéphane Roy	Cirque du Soleil: Varekai
2004
2004	Eugene Lee	Wicked
2004	John Lee Beatty	Wonderful Town
2004	Robert Brill	Assassins
2004	Tom Pye	Fiddler on the Roof
2004	Mark Thompson	Bombay Dreams
2005
2005	Michael Yeargan	The Light in the Piazza
2005	Lez Brotherston	Play Without Words
2005	Tim Hatley	Monty Python's Spamalot
2005	Scott Pask	Sweet Charity
2005	David Rockwell	All Shook Up
2005	Anthony Ward	Chitty Chitty Bang Bang
2006
2006	David Gallo	The Drowsy Chaperone
2006	Michael Bottari and Ronald Case	Fanny Hill
2006	John Doyle	Sweeney Todd: The Demon Barber of Fleet Street
2006	Thomas Lynch	See What I Wanna See
2006	Allen Moyer	Grey Gardens
2006	Scott Pask	The Wedding Singer
2007
2007	Bob Crowley	Mary Poppins
2007	Beowulf Boritt	LoveMusik
2007	Anna Louizos	In the Heights
2007	Anna Louizos	Curtains
2007	David Rockwell	Legally Blonde
2007	Kris Stone	Brundibar/But the Giraffe
2008
2008	Michael Yeargan	South Pacific
2008	David Gallo	A Catered Affair
2008	Takeshi Kata	Adding Machine
2008	Derek McLane	10 Million Miles
2008	George Tsypin	The Little Mermaid
2008	Robin Wagner	Young Frankenstein
2009
2009	Tim Hatley	Shrek the Musical
2009	Anna Louizos	Irving Berlin's White Christmas
2009	Thomas Lynch	Happiness
2009	Scott Pask	9 to 5
2009	Scott Pask	Hair
2009	Basil Twist	Arias with a Twist

=== 2010s ===
Year	Designer	Production
2016
2016	David Rockwell	She Loves Me
2016	Es Devlin	American Psycho
2016	Emily Orling, Matt Saunders and Eric Farber	Futurity
2017
2017	Mimi Lien	Natasha, Pierre & The Great Comet of 1812
2017	Les Brotherson	946: The Amazing Story of Adolphus Tips
2017	Simon Kenny	Sweeney Todd: The Demon Barber of Fleet Street
2017	Santo Loquasto	Hello, Dolly!
2017	Jason Sherwood	The View UpStairs
2018
2018	David Zinn	SpongeBob SquarePants
2018	Louisa Adamson and Christian Barry	Old Stock: A Refugee Love Story
2018	Beowulf Boritt	Prince of Broadway
2018	Dane Laffrey	Once on This Island
2018	Santo Loquasto	Carousel
2019
2019	David Korins	Beetlejuice
2019	Rachel Hauck	Hadestown
2019	Laura Jellinek	Rodgers & Hammerstein's Oklahoma!
2019	Laura Jellinek	Rags Parkland Sings the Songs of the Future
2019	Rae Smith	Girl from the North Country

=== 2020s ===
Year	Designer	Production
2020
2020	Derek McLane	Moulin Rouge!
2020	Julian Crouch	Little Shop of Horrors
2020	Anna Louizos	Scotland, PA
2020	Clint Ramos	Soft Power
2020	Amy Rubin and Brittany Vasta	Octet
2021	No awards: New York theatres shuttered, March 2020 to September 2021, due to the COVID-19 pandemic in New York City	
2022
2022	Beowulf Boritt	Flying Over Sunset
2022	Emma Bailey	Six
2022	Bunny Christie	Company
2022	David Zinn	Kimberly Akimbo
2023
2023	Beowulf Boritt	New York, New York
2023	David Korins	Only Gold
2023	Scott Pask	Shucked
2023	Walt Spangler & Brendan McCann (production props)	Stranger Sings! The Parody Musical
2023	Michael Yeargan	Camelot
2024	Paul Tate DePoo III	The Great Gatsby
2024	AMP featuring Tatiana Kahvegian	The Outsiders
2024	Riccardo Hernández	Suffs
2024	Arnulfo Maldonado	Dead Outlaw
2024	Grace Smart	Good Vibrations: A Punk Rock Musical
2025
2025	Dane Laffrey and George Reeve	Maybe Happy Ending (includes video design)
2025	Clifton Chadick	Music City
2025	Rachel Hauck	Swept Away
2025	Derek McLane	Just in Time
2025	David Rockwell and Finn Ross (projections)	Boop! The Musical

== See also ==
- Laurence Olivier Award for Best Set Design
- Tony Award for Best Scenic Design
