= Drama Desk Award for Outstanding Scenic Design of a Play =

New York theater awards

- Awarded for: Outstanding Scenic Design of a Play
- Location: New York City
- Country: United States
- Presented by: Drama Desk
- First award: 1996
- Currently held by: Chloe Lamford for Death of a Salesman (2026)
- Website: dramadesk.org (defunct)

The Drama Desk Award for Outstanding Scenic Design of a Play is an annual award presented by Drama Desk in recognition of achievements in theatre across collective Broadway, off-Broadway and off-off-Broadway productions in New York City.

The award was established in 1969, with the Drama Desk Award for Outstanding Set Design being presented each year to any play or musical production. Starting in 1996, the singular award was replaced by separate play and musical categories, but then merged again from 2010 to 2015; the separate play and musical categories have again co-existed since 2016.

David Gallo, Bob Crowley, Tim Hatley, Scott Pask, John Lee Beatty and Miriam Buether currently hold the record for most wins in the category, with two each. Derek McLane holds the record for most nominations without a win, with ten, followed by Beatty with seven (though he won two).

== Winners and nominees ==
Key

and bold indicates the winner.

=== 1990s ===
Year	Designer	Production	Ref.
1996
1996	**Scott Bradley**	**Seven Guitars**	
1996	Derek McLane and Mark McKenna	The Monogamist	
1996	Neil Patel	Quills	
1996	Narelle Sissons	Entertaining Mr. Sloane	
1996	Julie Taymor and Christine Jones	The Green Bird	
1996	Tony Walton	A Fair Country	
1997
1997	**David Gallo and Jan Hartley**	**Bunny Bunny**	
1997	Robert Brill	The Rehearsal	
1997	Marina Draghici	The Skriker	
1997	Derek McLane	Present Laughter	
1997	James Noone	The Gin Game	
1998
1998	**The Quay Brothers**	**The Chairs**	
1998	Loy Arcenas	Ballad of Yachiyo	
1998	Chris Barreca	Three Days of Rain	
1998	John Lee Beatty	Ivanov	
1998	Santo Loquasto	Milansky/Zilisnky or 'Schmucks'	
1998	Derek McLane	Misalliance	
1999
1999	**Richard Hoover**	**Not About Nightingales**	
1999	John Lee Beatty	The Mystery of Irma Vep	
1999	Maria Björnson	Britannicus and Phèdre	
1999	Bob Crowley	Twelfth Night	
1999	Allen Moyer	That Championship Season	
1999	James Noone	Night Must Fall	

=== 2000s ===
Year	Designer	Production	Ref.
2000
2000	**David Gallo**	**Jitney**	
2000	Derek McLane	East is East	
2000	James Noone	The Time of the Cuckoo	
2000	Rob Odorisio	An Empty Plate in the Café du Grand Boeuf	
2000	Neil Patel	Dinner with Friends	
2000	Tony Walton	Uncle Vanya	
2001
2001	**Bob Crowley**	**The Invention of Love**	
2001	John Lee Beatty	Comic Potential	
2001	Jeff Cowie	The Bitter Tears of Petra von Kant	
2001	David Gallo	King Hedley II	
2001	Thomas Lynch	Old Money	
2001	Dean Taucher	Tabletop	
2002
2002	**Tim Hatley**	**Private Lives**	
2002	John Lee Beatty	Morning's at Seven	
2002	Michael Brown	World of Mirth	
2002	David Gallo	Wonder of the World	
2002	Derek McLane	The Women	
2002	Douglas Stein and Rupert Bohle	36 Views	
2003
2003	**John Lee Beatty**	**Dinner at Eight**	
2003	John Lee Beatty	My Old Lady	
2003	Troy Hourie	Temporary Help	
2003	Scott Pask	Take Me Out	
2003	Neil Patel	Endpapers	
2003	B.T. Whitehill	Shanghai Moon	
2004
2004	**John Lee Beatty**	**Twentieth Century**	
2004	Scott Bradley	The Notebooks of Leonardo da Vinci	
2004	Ralph Funicello	Henry IV	
2004	David Korins	Blackbird	
2004	Andrew Lieberman	Wintertime	
2004	Derek McLane	I Am My Own Wife	
2005
2005	**Santo Loquasto**	**Glengarry Glen Ross**	
2005	Robert Brill	A Streetcar Named Desire	
2005	Marisa Frantz	Frankenstein	
2005	Nathan Heverin	Outward Bound	
2005	Richard Hoover	After the Fall	
2005	David Korins	Orange Flower Water	
2006
2006	**Michael Yeargan**	**Awake and Sing!**	
2006	Roger Hanna	Walking Down Broadway	
2006	Eugene Lee	The Ruby Sunrise	
2006	Derek McLane	Abigail's Party	
2006	Robert Wilson	Peer Gynt	
2006	Michael Yeargan	Seascape	
2007
2007	**Bob Crowley and Scott Pask**	**The Coast of Utopia**	
2007	David Gallo	Radio Golf	
2007	David Korins	Essential Self-Defense	
2007	David Korins	Jack Goes Boating	
2007	Garin Marschall	Hell House	
2007	Scott Pask	Blackbird	
2008
2008	**Scott Pask**	**Les Liaisons Dangereuses**	
2008	Beowulf Boritt	Spain	
2008	Scott Bradley	Eurydice	
2008	David Korins	Hunting and Gathering	
2008	Santo Loquasto	Trumpery	
2008	Clint Ramos	The Return of the Prodigal	
2009
2009	**David Korins**	**Why Torture is Wrong, and the People Who Love Them**	
2009	Dale Ferguson	Exit the King	
2009	Rob Howell	The Norman Conquests	
2009	Neil Patel	Fifty Words	
2009	Derek McLane	33 Variations	
2009	Walt Spangler	Desire Under the Elms	

=== 2010s ===
Year	Designer	Production	Ref.
2010-2015	N/A		
2016
2016	**Christopher Oram**	**Hughie**	
2016	Riccardo Hernandez	Red Speedo	
2016	Mimi Lien	John	
2016	G. W. Mercier	Head of Passes	
2016	Derek McLane	Fully Committed	
2017
2017	**Nigel Hook**	**The Play That Goes Wrong**	
2017	David Gallo	Jitney	
2017	Laura Jellinek	A Life	
2017	Stewart Laing	The Hairy Ape	
2017	Douglas W. Schmidt	The Front Page	
2018
2018	**Miriam Buether**	**Three Tall Women**	
2018	Bunny Christie	People, Places and Things	
2018	Lizzie Clachan	Yerma	
2018	Maruti Evans	Kill Move Paradise	
2018	Louisa Thompson	In the Blood	
2019
2019	**Matt Saunders**	**"Daddy"**	
2019	Miriam Buether	The Jungle	
2019	Es Devlin	Girls & Boys	
2019	Maruti Evans	The Peculiar Patriot	
2019	Mimi Lien	Fairview	

=== 2020s ===
Year	Designer	Production	Ref.
2020	**Clint Ramos**	**Grand Horizons**	
2020	Catherine Cornell	Mac Beth	
2020	Adam Rigg	Fefu and Her Friends	
2020	Paul Steinberg	Judgment Day	
2020	B.T. Whitehill	The Confession of Lily Dare	
2021	No awards: New York theatres shuttered, March 2020 to September 2021, due to the COVID-19 pandemic in New York City		
2022	**Takeshi Kata**	**Clyde's**	
2022	Beowulf Boritt	Merry Wives	
2022	Wilson Chin	Pass Over	
2022	Marsha Ginsberg	English	
2022	Junghyun Georgia Lee	Kristina Wong, Sweatshop Overlord	
2023	**Tim Hatley**	**Life of Pi**	
2023	Jason Ardizzone-West	Wedding Band	
2023	Beowulf Boritt	Ohio State Murders	
2023	dots	Public Obscenities	
2023	Natasha Jenkins	Love	
2023	John McDermott	Chains	
2024	**David Zinn**	**Stereophonic**	
2024	dots	Appropriate	
2024	Es Devlin	The Hunt	
2024	Derek McLane	Purlie Victorious: A Non-Confederate; Romp through the Cotton Patch	
2024	Scott Pask	Grey House	
2025	**Miriam Buether, Jamie Harrison and Chris Fisher**	Stranger Things: The First Shadow	
2025	Miriam Buether	Glass. Kill. What If If Only. Imp.	
2025	Rob Howell	The Hills of California	
2025	Johan Kølkjær	Dark Noon	
2025	Gabriel Hainer Evansohn and Grace Laubacher	Life and Trust	
2025	Matt Saunders	Walden	
2026
2026	**Chloe Lamford**	**Death of a Salesman**	
2026	Harry Feiner	Ceremonies in Dark Old Men	
2026	Soutra Gilmour	Waiting for Godot	
2026	Tatiana Kahvegian	Meet the Cartozians	
2026	Derek McLane	The Adding Machine	
2026	Derek McLane	The Balusters	

== Multiple wins ==
2 wins

- David Gallo
- Bob Crowley
- Tim Hatley
- Scott Pask
- John Lee Beatty
- Miriam Buether

== Multiple nominations ==
10 nominations

- Derek McLane

7 nominations

- John Lee Beatty

6 nominations

- David Gallo
- David Korins

5 nominations

- Scott Pask

4 nominations

- Scott Bradley
- Neil Patel
- Miriam Buether

3 nominations

- James Noone
- Santo Loquasto
- Bob Crowley

2 nominations

- Tony Walton
- Robert Brill
- Richard Hoover
- B.T. Whitehill
- Tim Hatley
- Michael Yeargan
- Clint Ramos
- Mimi Lien
- Maruti Evans
- Matt Saunders
- Es Devlin
- dots
- Rob Howell

== See also ==
- Laurence Olivier Award for Best Set Design
- Tony Award for Best Scenic Design
