= American Buffalo (play) =

1975 play by David Mamet

- Original language: English
- Written by: David Mamet
- Characters: Walter "Teach" Cole; Donny Dubrow; Bobby
- Genre: Drama
- Setting: Don's Resale Shop, a junkshop in Chicago, on one Friday

Premiere
- Date: 1975
- Place: Goodman Theatre, Chicago

American Buffalo is a 1975 play by American playwright David Mamet that had its premiere in a showcase production at the Goodman Theatre, Chicago. After two additional showcase productions, it opened on Broadway in 1977.

== Plot ==
Act I takes place at about 11 a.m. Don, who owns the junk shop where the entire play takes place, has sold a buffalo nickel to a customer for $90 but now suspects it is worth considerably more. He and his young gofer, Bob (sometimes called Bobby), plan to steal the coin back. Bob has been keeping watch on the customer's house and reports that he has left for the weekend with a suitcase. Teach, a poker buddy of Don's, arrives and learns of the scheme. He persuades Don that Bob is too inexperienced and untrustworthy for the burglary, and proposes himself as Bob's replacement. Teach suggests they steal the whole coin collection and more. Don insists on their poker buddy Fletcher going with Teach. Teach continues to argue that he can do the job without Fletcher.

Act II takes place a little before midnight on the same day. Teach and Don make final preparations for the burglary while waiting for Fletcher, who is late. Teach tells Don that Fletcher is a liar and a cheater at cards, and prepares to go commit the burglary on his own. Don tries to persuade him not to take his gun with him when Bob appears at the store. He attempts to sell Don a buffalo nickel, similar to the one Don had sold the customer. When asked where he got the coin, Bob is evasive. Teach suspects that Bob and Fletcher have organized and completed their own burglary behind Don and Teach's backs. He asks Bob where Fletcher is. Bob tells him that Fletcher was mugged by "some Mexicans" and is in a hospital, but when Don calls the hospital, they have no record of his admission. Bob claims that he must have been mistaken about the name of the hospital, but the suspicious Teach strikes him on the head with a metal object. Another friend calls, corroborating Bob's story and naming the correct hospital. Don calls the hospital and confirms that Fletcher has been admitted with a broken jaw. Bob confesses that he made up the story about the customer leaving with a suitcase, and that he bought the second nickel from a coin dealer in order to make up with Don for his failure to keep tabs on the customer. Don admonishes Teach for wounding Bob and orders him to get his car so they can take him to the hospital.

== Style ==
As is emblematic of Mamet's writing style, the play's dialogue is sometimes terse and often vulgar. Teach says "cunt" numerous times and both Don and Teach say "fuck" even more. Racial slurs are also used. By way of contrast, the younger character Bobby only says "fuck" in situations of extreme duress: immediately after being beaten and his final apology to Donny. Mamet's profanity is not employed for shock value, but is rather an integral component of his characters' "profane poetry", which, according to frequent collaborator Gregory Mosher, "worked the iambic pentameter out of the vernacular of the underclass." The characters' sometimes vulgar lexicon, moreover, may be seen as psychologically necessary armor against their brutal environment.

The parenthetical stage directions are straightforward and do not provide line readings.

== Productions ==
American Buffalo opened in Chicago at the Goodman Theatre Stage II on November 23, 1975, directed by Gregory Mosher with a cast that featured William H. Macy (Bobby), Bernard Erhard (Teach), and J.J. Johnston (Donny).

The play premiered Off-Broadway at the Theatre at St. Clement's Church on January 26, 1976 and closed on February 7, 1976. Directed by Gregory Mosher, the cast featured Mike Kellin (Teach), Michael Egan (Donny) and J. T. Walsh (Bobby).

The play premiered on Broadway at the Ethel Barrymore Theatre on February 8, 1977 in previews, officially on February 16, 1977, and closed on June 11, 1977 after 122 performances. Directed by Ulu Grosbard, the cast featured Robert Duvall (Teach), Kenneth McMillan (Donny), and John Savage (Bobby). Sets were by Santo Loquasto and lighting by Jules Fisher.

The play was produced again Off-Broadway at the Circle in the Square (Downtown) in June 1981, starring Al Pacino as Teach, Thomas G. Waites (Bobby) and Clifton James (Donny) and directed by Arvin Brown. This production ran at the Long Wharf Theater, New Haven, Connecticut, in 1980.

The play was revived on Broadway at the Booth Theatre, running from October 20, 1983 (previews) to February 4, 1984. Directed by Arvin Brown, the cast starred Al Pacino (Walter Cole, called Teach), James Hayden (Bobby) and J. J. Johnston (Donny Dubrow). The production was nominated for the 1984 Tony Award, Revival (Play or Musical), and Pacino was nominated for the 1984 Drama Desk Award, Outstanding Actor in a Play. During the November 8 performance of this run, Hayden received a standing ovation for his performance; six hours later, he died of a heroin overdose while on the phone with his estranged wife while in his Upper West Side apartment. He was replaced by his understudy, John Shepard.

The play was presented at the Donmar Warehouse, London, from January 28, 2000 to February 26, starring William H. Macy (Teach), Philip Baker Hall (Donny) and Mark Webber (Bobby), directed by Neil Pepe. This production transferred to Off-Broadway at the Atlantic Theatre Company in March 2000 and closed on May 21, 2000. (Mamet and Macy are co-founders of the Atlantic Theatre Company.)

Another production was in April/May 2002 at Royal Exchange, Manchester, directed by Greg Hersov. It featured Mike McShane as Donny, Ben Keaton as Teach, and Paul Popplewell as Bobby. Ben Keaton won Best Actor and Paul Popplewell was nominated for Best Supporting Actor at the Manchester Theatre Awards (M.E.N.) & TV Awards.

The play was revived on Broadway in 2008 and starred Cedric the Entertainer, Haley Joel Osment, and John Leguizamo, but it closed after eight performances.

The play was produced at Wyndham's Theatre in the West End, London, directed by Daniel Evans and starring John Goodman as Donny, Damian Lewis as Teach, and Tom Sturridge as Bobby. The show ran from 17 April to 27 June 2015.

Another revival on Broadway, directed by Neil Pepe and starring Laurence Fishburne, Sam Rockwell and Darren Criss at the Circle in the Square Theatre was set to begin previews in March 2020 with an official opening on April 14, but the show suspended production due to the COVID-19 pandemic. In October 2021, it was reported that the production would begin previews on March 22, 2022 with an official opening set for April 14. In the end, the production with the aforementioned cast & director began a 16-week run on March 22, 2022 with a final performance set for July 10, 2022. Sam Rockwell was nominated for a 2022 Tony Award for Best Lead Actor in a play for his performance as Teach.

== Cast list ==
Character	Goodman Theatre, Chicago 1975	Original Broadway Cast 1977	First Broadway revival 1983	Donmar Warehouse, London 2000	Royal Exchange, Manchester 2002	Second Broadway revival 2008	Wyndham's Theatre, London 2015	Third Broadway revival 2022
Teach	Bernard Erhard	Robert Duvall	Al Pacino	William H. Macy	Ben Keaton	John Leguizamo	Damian Lewis	Sam Rockwell
Donny	J.J. Johnston	Kenneth McMillan	J.J. Johnston	Philip Baker Hall	Mike McShane	Cedric the Entertainer	John Goodman	Laurence Fishburne
Bobby	William H. Macy	John Savage	James Hayden	Mark Webber	Paul Popplewell	Haley Joel Osment	Tom Sturridge	Darren Criss

== Critical response ==
Critic Frank Rich, in reviewing the 1983 production for The New York Times, called it "one of the best American plays of the last decade." Rich had previously reviewed the 1981 Off-Broadway production, calling the play "brilliant", and noting: "The play, though, is the thing. Working with the tiniest imaginable vocabulary – words like nothing, great, and no, as well as those of four letters – Mr. Mamet creates a subterranean world with its own nonliterate comic beat, life-and death struggles, pathos and even affection... In American Buffalo, he has created a deceptively small-scale tragedy that is packed with the power to explode the largest of American myths."

== Awards and nominations ==
=== 1975 Off-Broadway Production ===
Year	Award	Category	Nominee	Result	Ref.
1976	Obie Award	Best New American Play		Won	
1976	Obie Award	Distinguished Performance	Mike Kellin	Honored	

=== 1977 Broadway Production ===
Year	Award	Category	Nominee	Result	Ref.
1977	Tony Award	Best Direction of a Play	Ulu Grosbard	Nominated	
1977	Tony Award	Best Scenic Design	Santo Loquasto	Nominated	
1977	New York Drama Critics' Circle Award	Best American Play		Won	
1977	Drama Desk Award	Best New American Play		Nominated	
1977	Drama Desk Award	Outstanding Actor in a Play	Robert Duvall	Nominated	
1977	Drama Desk Award	Outstanding Director of a Play	Ulu Grosbard	Nominated	
1977	Drama Desk Award	Outstanding Scenic Design of a Play	Santo Loquasto	Won	

=== 1983 Broadway Revival ===
Year	Award	Category	Nominee	Result	Ref.
1984	Tony Award	Best Revival		Nominated	
1984	Drama Desk Award	Drama Desk Award for Outstanding Actor in a Play	Al Pacino	Nominated	
1984	Theatre World Award	Outstanding Performance	J.J. Johnston	Won	

=== 2022 Broadway Revival ===
Year	Award	Category	Nominee	Result	Ref.
2022	Tony Award	Best Revival of a Play		Nominated	
2022	Tony Award	Best Performance by a Leading Actor in a Play	Sam Rockwell	Nominated	
2022	Tony Award	Best Direction of a Play	Neil Pepe	Nominated	
2022	Tony Award	Best Scenic Design of a Play	Scott Pask	Nominated	
2022	Outer Critics Circle Award	Outstanding Actor in a Play	Sam Rockwell	Nominated	
2022	Outer Critics Circle Award	Outstanding Scenic Design	Scott Pask	Nominated	

== Film adaptation ==
The play was also adapted to a 1996 film, with Dennis Franz (Don), Dustin Hoffman (Teach), and Sean Nelson (Bobby).
