= The Mineola Twins =

The Mineola Twins is a play by Paula Vogel with music by David Van Tieghem, which premiered Off-Broadway in 1999.

== Overview ==
The story satirically examines women's experience and the women's movement over more than three decades in post-World War II America, as seen through the life of identical twins, Myra and Myrna, from Mineola, New York, who are played by one actress. The twins' contrasting personalities are presented in often extreme and comic ways. For example, one is a rebellious radical, while the other is an uptight conservative.

The play takes place during the Eisenhower Administration; then at the start of the Nixon Administration; and finally during the Bush Administration. In an author's note, Vogel suggests that female singers of the time, such as Teresa Brewer and Vicki Carr be used.

=== Characters ===
- Myrna, the "good" twin
- Myra, the "bad" twin
- Jim, Myrna's fiancé
- Kenny, Myrna's son
- Ben, Myra's son
- Sarah, played by the actress who also plays Jim
- Two psychiatric aides/Federal agents

== Productions ==
The play was first produced by the Perseverance Theatre in Juneau, Alaska, in November 1996. It was then produced at the Trinity Repertory Company in Providence, Rhode Island in February to March 1997, again directed by Molly Smith (former artistic director of Perseverance) and starring Anne Scurria.

The Mineola Twins opened Off-Broadway on February 18, 1999, after a month of previews and closed on May 30, 1999, at the Laura Pels Theatre in a Roundabout Theatre production. Directed by Joe Mantello with musical staging by Ken Roberson, the cast included Swoosie Kurtz as the twins, Mo Gaffney as Myrna's boyfriend Jim and later Myra's lesbian lover Sarah, Mandy Siegfried as the twins' sons, Kenny and Ben. Additional cast included Jimmy Holder and Daniel Stewart Sherman. The New York Times critic Vincent Canby wrote, "Working lightly, surely and always in sync ... Vogel ... Mantello [and] Kurtz and a dream supporting cast are cheering up a mostly dreary season with The Mineola Twins, the exhilarating Roundabout Theater Company entertainment."

Subsequent productions have included a 2004 run at the Straz Center for the Performing Arts in Tampa, Florida, and a 2012 production at The Arts Square Theatre in Las Vegas, Nevada.

== Awards and nominations ==
Source: Lortel.org

- Lucille Lortel Awards (1999) for: Outstanding Scenic Design, Robert Brill and Scott Pask (winner); Outstanding Costume Design, Jess Goldstein (winner); Outstanding Lighting Design, Kevin Adams (winner)
- Obie Award (1998–1999): Performance, Swoosie Kurtz (winner)
- 1999 Drama Desk Award, Outstanding Actress in a Play, Swoosie Kurtz (nomination)
- Henry Hewes Design Awards: (1999) for: Scenic Design, Robert Brill and Scott Pask (winner); Costume Design, Jess Goldstein (winner)
- Outer Critics Circle Award nominations for: Outstanding Off-Broadway Play; Outstanding Actress in a Play, Swoosie Kurtz; Outstanding Featured Actress in a Play, Mandy Siegfried
