= James Hayden =

American actor

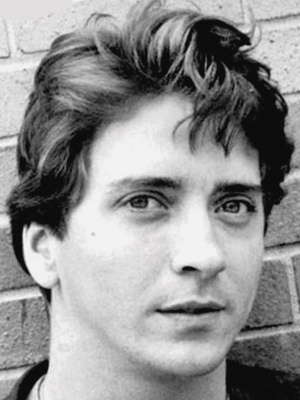
- Hayden as Patrick ‘Patsy’ Goldberg in the film Once Upon a Time in America
- Born: November 25, 1953; Brooklyn, New York, U.S.
- Died: November 8, 1983 (aged 29); New York City, New York, U.S.
- Occupation: Actor
- Years active: 1979–1983

James Hayden (November 25, 1953 – November 8, 1983) was an American actor from Bay Ridge, Brooklyn. Apart from starring on Broadway, he is best known for playing Patrick "Patsy" Goldberg in the 1984 film Once Upon a Time in America.

== Life and career ==
Hayden trained and served as a medic in the United States Army during the Vietnam War. On his discharge, he returned to New York, attended the American Academy of Dramatic Arts, and began working as an actor.

In 1983, the year of his death, Hayden portrayed a heroin addict in the critically acclaimed Broadway play American Buffalo, co-starring with his close friend Al Pacino.

According to The New York Times, on November 8, 1983, at 4:30 AM, Hayden was speaking to his estranged wife, on the telephone, when his voice suddenly ceased. Mrs. Hayden immediately called Hayden's physician, and the physician called the 911 emergency number over to Hayden's Manhattan apartment at 69th Street and Broadway. Police discovered Hayden slumped over the kitchen sink, telephone still in hand. On the floor of the kitchen, police had found a hypodermic needle and several glassine envelopes believed to contain heroin. He was pronounced dead at St. Luke's-Roosevelt Hospital Center. Just six hours before his death, he had received a standing ovation for his performance.

In 1984, during the making of The Pope of Greenwich Village, Mickey Rourke dedicated his performance to the memory of Hayden.

== Filmography ==
Year	Title	Role	Notes
1980	Cruising	Cockpit Coke Man	(scenes deleted)
1980	Marilyn: The Untold Story		TV movie
1980	The First Deadly Sin	Young Policeman	
1981	The Intruder Within	Harry Colman	TV movie
1981	The Nesting	GI #1	
1981	The Patricia Neal Story	Martin Sheen	TV movie
1984	Once Upon a Time in America	Patrick "Patsy" Goldberg	Posthumous release
