= David Rockwell =

American architect

- Rockwell in 2026
- Born: July 21, 1956 (age 70); Chicago, Illinois, U.S.
- Education: Syracuse University (BA); Architectural Association School of Architecture (MArch)
- Occupations: Architect; designer
- Children: 2
- Website: rockwellgroup.com

David Rockwell (born July 21, 1956) is an American architect and designer. He is the founder and president of Rockwell Group, a 250-person cross-disciplinary architecture and design practice based in New York City with satellite offices in Madrid and Los Angeles.

== Early life and education ==
Rockwell grew up in a theater family. His mother, a vaudeville dancer and choreographer, often cast him in community repertory productions. When he was 12, David's family moved from Deal, New Jersey to Guadalajara, Mexico. Rockwell trained in architecture at Syracuse University and the Architectural Association School of Architecture in London.

== Career ==
Rockwell was working for another architect designing a version of Le Crazy Horse Saloon in New York when he was offered a job to design a renovation of the restaurant Le Périgord in four weeks. His work at Le Périgord led to a commission in 1983 to design the space for the 40-seat restaurant Sushi Zen, which served as the launching point for his career. Rockwell founded Rockwell Group in 1984.

Rockwell currently serves as Chair Emeritus of the Design Industries Foundation Fighting AIDS (DIFFA) and as a board member of Citymeals-on-Wheels, and New York Restoration Project. Rockwell also conceived and developed Imagination Playground pro-bono, a play space designed to encourage children to work together to create their own worlds of play. After five years of research on children and play, the first site-specific location opened in collaboration with the New York City Department of Parks and Recreation at Burling Slip in Manhattan in 2010. Rockwell Group developed portable, scalable models that can transform smaller, unused areas into play spaces. Through the U.N.I.C.E.F. P.L.A.Y. Project, in partnership with Disney, the blocks have been distributed to more than 13,000 children in Bangladesh and Haiti.

== Awards ==
Rockwell's honors include the 2016 Tony Award for Best Scenic Design for the musical She Loves Me and eight Tony Award nominations for Best Scenic Design, the AIA New York Chapter President's Award; the 2008 National Design Award by the Smithsonian's Cooper-Hewitt National Design Museum for outstanding achievement in Interior Design; the 2009 Pratt Legends Award; the Presidential Design Award for his renovation of the Grand Central Terminal; induction into the James Beard Foundation Who's Who of Food & Beverage in America and Interior Design magazine's Hall of Fame; inclusion in Architectural Digest's AD 100; and the 2016 Drama Desk Award for Outstanding Scenic Design of a Musical for She Loves Me and five Drama Desk Award nominations for Outstanding Scenic Design of a Musical. Rockwell Group was named by Fast Company in 2008, 2014 and 2015 as one of the most innovative design practices in their annual World's 50 Most Innovative Companies issue. Rockwell is a Fellow of the American Institute of Architects. World Winners Prix Versailles 2018

== Select design projects ==
- Chefs Club by Food & Wine, New York
- Gordon Ramsay's Maze (London)
- Maialino, New York
- Nobu restaurants worldwide, including New York, Hong Kong, Las Vegas, Doha, Melbourne and Dubai
- Aloft hotels (Starwood Hotels & Resorts)
- Andaz Maui at Wailea, Hawaii
- The Cosmopolitan of Las Vegas
- Nobu Hotel Caesars Palace, Las Vegas
- Nobu Hotel Eden Roc Miami Beach
- W Hotels New York, Union Square, Vieques, Paris, Singapore, and Madrid
- Hall of Fragments, the entrance installation to the 2008 Venice Architecture Biennale
- Walt Disney Family Museum
- The Center for Civil and Human Rights, Atlanta
- Elinor Bunin-Munroe Film Center, Lincoln Center
- The Shed (Diller Scofidio + Renfro, Leader Architect, and Rockwell Group, Collaborating Architect)
- 15 Hudson Yards in collaboration with Diller Scofidio + Renfro
- TED Theater, Vancouver
- Dolby Theatre, home of the Academy Awards ceremony (Los Angeles)
- The Marketplace at the JetBlue terminal at John F. Kennedy International Airport
- NeueHouse, New York and Los Angeles
- Shinola
- Imagination Playground
- Moxy Chelsea
- The New York EDITION
- Rockwell Unscripted for Knoll
- Union Square Cafe
- Sky (skyscraper)
- NEMA (Chicago)
- Hayes Theater
- The Perelman, New York City (Restaurant and Lobby Interior Architect)
- 93rd Oscars, Production Design
- Hopkins Student Center for Johns Hopkins University, Baltimore
- Climate Pledge Arena, Seattle
- DineOut NYC pro bono initiative

== Set design ==
- Fallen Angels
- Into the Woods
- Hairspray
- The Rocky Horror Show
- Dirty Rotten Scoundrels
- All Shook Up
- Legally Blonde
- Team America: World Police (2004, film)
- The 81st Annual Academy Awards (2009)
- The 82nd Annual Academy Awards (2010)
- The Normal Heart
- Catch Me If You Can
- Harvey
- Kinky Boots
- Lucky Guy
- You Can't Take It with You
- Side Show
- On the Twentieth Century
- She Loves Me
- On Your Feet!
- Falsettos
- Lobby Hero
- Pretty Woman
- Tootsie
- 93rd Oscars (2021)
- Fallen Angels
- Pirates! The Penzance Musical
- Art
- A Beautiful Noise
- Doubt
- Chess

== Books ==
- Pleasure: The Architecture and Design of Rockwell Group, Universe, a division of Rizzoli Books, 2002.
- David Rockwell with Bruce Mau, Spectacle, Phaidon Press, 2006. Examines the history and public fascination with larger-than-life man-made events.
- What If...?: The Architecture and Design of David Rockwell, Metropolis Books, 2014.
- Drama by David Rockwell, Phaidon, May 2021

== Awards and nominations ==
Year	Award	Category	Work	Result	Ref.
2001	Drama Desk Award	Outstanding Scenic Design of a Musical	The Rocky Horror Show	Nominated	
2003	Drama Desk Award	Outstanding Scenic Design of a Musical	Hairspray	Nominated	
2003	Tony Award	Best Scenic Design	Hairspray	Nominated	
2003	Outer Critics Circle Award	Outstanding Scenic Design	Dinner at Eight	Nominated	
2005	Drama Desk Award	Outstanding Scenic Design of a Musical	All Shook Up	Nominated	
2007	Drama Desk Award	Outstanding Scenic Design of a Musical	Legally Blonde	Nominated	
2013	Tony Award	Best Scenic Design in a Musical	Kinky Boots	Nominated	
2013	Tony Award	Best Scenic Design in a Play	Lucky Guy	Nominated	
2015	Tony Award	Best Scenic Design in a Musical	On the Twentieth Century	Nominated	
2015	Outer Critics Circle Award	Outstanding Scenic Design	On the Twentieth Century	Nominated	
2015	Tony Award	Best Scenic Design in a Play	You Can't Take It with You	Nominated	
2016	Tony Award	Best Scenic Design in a Musical	She Loves Me	Won	
2016	Drama Desk Award	Outstanding Scenic Design of a Musical	She Loves Me	Won	
2016	Outer Critics Circle Award	Outstanding Scenic Design	She Loves Me	Won	
2022	Lucille Lortel Award	Outstanding Scenic Design	Seven Deadly Sins	Nominated	
2025	Drama Desk Award	Outstanding Scenic Design of a Musical	Boop! The Musical	Nominated	
2026	Tony Award	Best Scenic Design in a Play	Fallen Angels	Nominated	

== See also ==
- List of Syracuse University People
- InterContinental Hong Kong
