= Rachel Hauck =

Scenic designer

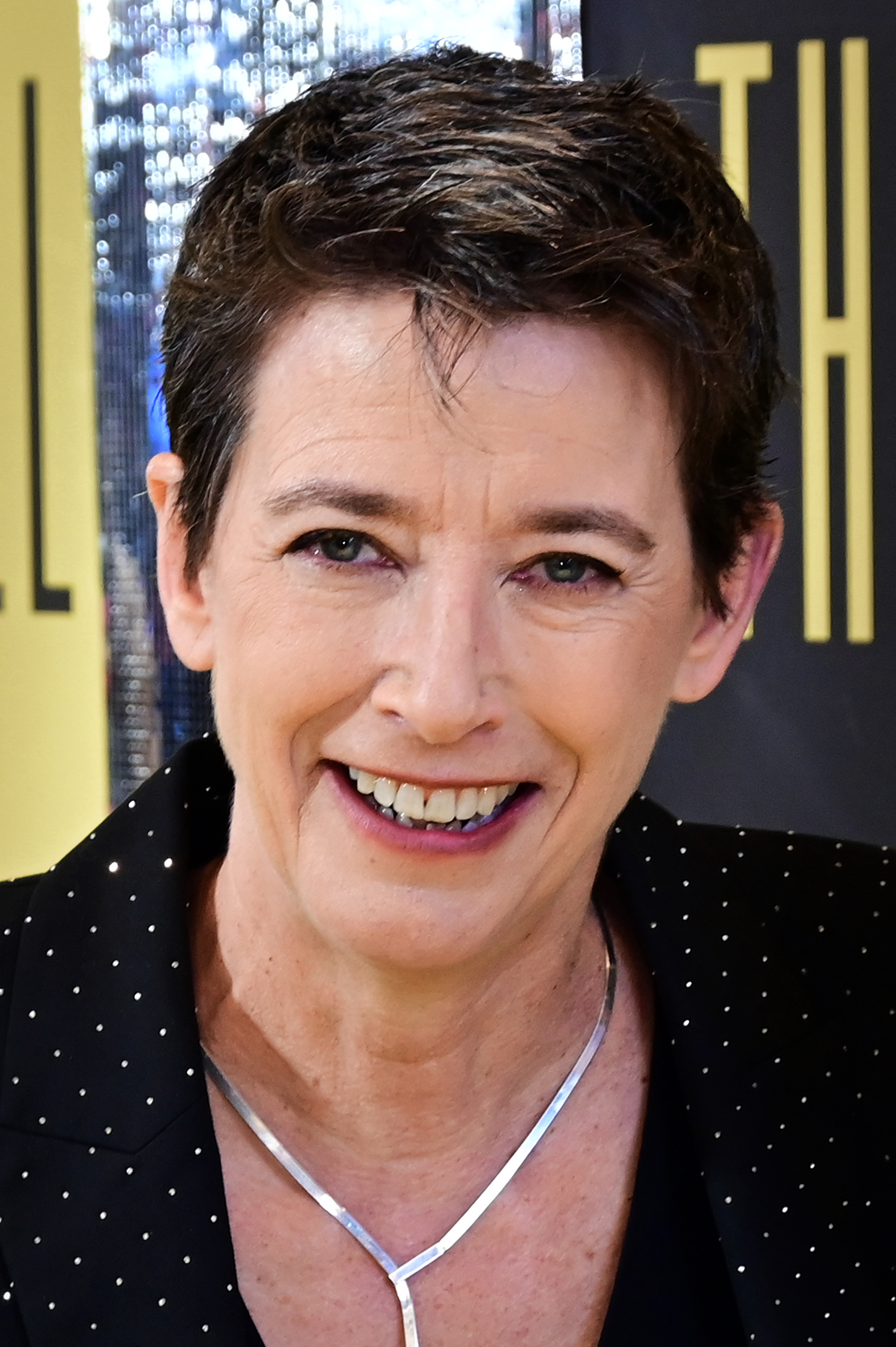
- Hauck in 2026
- Occupation: Scenic Designer

Rachel Hauck is a scenic designer based in New York City who is known for her work in Anaïs Mitchell's musical Hadestown on and off-Broadway and in London, John Leguizamo's Latin History for Morons on and off-Broadway, and her extensive off-Broadway work.

== Career ==
Rachel Hauck started her career as Art Direction Intern for the Academy of Television Arts and Sciences in 1990 but moved into theater soon after her time in film and TV. She then became the resident scenic designer for the Eugene O'Neill Theater Center for ten years, then moved to teaching at Brown University, New York University/Playwrights Horizons, Vassar College, and Cal Arts.

Hauck was also instrumental in creating the first ever off-Broadway collective bargaining agreement for the United Scenic Artists union as one of the trustees of the Eastern Region Executive Board.

In 2016, Hauck was honored by the American Theatre Wing with an Obie Award for Sustained Excellence in Scenic Design.

Hauck is currently represented on Broadway in Anaïs Mitchell's Hadestown at the Walter Kerr Theatre and in Heidi Schreck's What the Constitution Means to Me at the Hayes Theater. She has been involved in Hadestown and What the Constitution Means to Me since their respective world premieres in 2017. For Hadestown, Hauck has also designed the Edmonton production at the Citadel Theatre and the London production at the Royal National Theatre.

In 2022, Hauck was featured in the book 50 Key Figures in Queer US Theatre, with a profile written by theatre scholar Stacy Wolf.

== Personal life ==
Hauck is lesbian, and is in a long-term relationship with writer/director Lisa Peterson.

== Awards and nominations ==
| Year | Award | Show | Result |
|---|---|---|---|
| 2026 | Tony Award for Best Scenic Design of a Musical | Cats: The Jellicle Ball | Nominated |
| 2025 | Tony Award for Best Scenic Design of a Musical | Swept Away | Nominated |
| 2023 | Tony Award for Best Scenic Design of a Play | Good Night, Oscar | Nominated |
| 2019 | Tony Award for Best Scenic Design of a Musical | Hadestown | Won |
| 2019 | Drama Desk Award for Outstanding Scenic Design of a Musical | Hadestown | Nominated |
| 2019 | Outer Critics Circle Award for Outstanding Scenic Design (Play or Musical) | Hadestown | Nominated |
| 2017 | Lucille Lortel Award for Outstanding Scenic Design | Hadestown | Nominated |
| 2017 | Hewes Design Award for Scenic Design | Tiny Beautiful Things | Nominated |
| 2016 | Obie Award for Sustained Excellence in Scenic Design | | Won |
| 2015 | Hewes Design Award for Scenic Design | And I and Silence | Nominated |
| 2013 | Hewes Design Award for Scenic Design | Slowgirl | Nominated |
| 2011 | Lucille Lortel Award for Outstanding Scenic Design | This Wide Night | Nominated |
| 2011 | The Lilly Award for Excellence in Scenic Design | | Won |
