= Scott Pask =

American scenic and costume designer

- Born: Rochester, New York, U.S.
- Education: University of Arizona (BArch); Yale University (MFA)
- Occupations: Scenic designer, costume designer
- Years active: 1998–present
- Awards: Tony Award for Best Scenic Design of a Musical; Tony Award for Best Scenic Design of a Play

Scott Pask is an American scenic and costume designer. He has worked primarily on stage productions in the United States, on Broadway and Off-Broadway, and in regional theatre, as well as in the United Kingdom. He has won Tony Awards for his work on The Pillowman, The Coast of Utopia and The Book of Mormon.

== Early life and education ==
Pask was born in Rochester, New York and raised in Yuma, Arizona, with his twin brother, Bruce. Pask earned a Bachelor of Architecture degree from the University of Arizona and a Master of Fine Arts from Yale University. Bruce is a noted stylist and men's fashion director at T: The New York Times Style Magazine.

== Career ==
His Broadway credits include Les Liaisons Dangereuses, Urinetown, The Coast of Utopia, The Vertical Hour, Martin Short: Fame Becomes Me, Kiki and Herb: Alive on Broadway, The Wedding Singer, La Cage aux Folles, Amour, Sweet Charity, Little Shop of Horrors, Take Me Out, Nine, The Pillowman, and A Steady Rain. He made his Metropolitan Opera debut with his design for Benjamin Britten's Peter Grimes.

Pask designed the original production of The Pillowman and its subsequent UK tour for the National Theatre. Additional credits include On an Average Day (West End) and Tales From Hollywood (Donmar Warehouse), both directed by John Crowley; Bash (Almeida Theatre, New York, Los Angeles, and Showtime); Albert Herring (Opera North U.K); The Underpants, The Bomb-itty of Errors, The Donkey Show (NY, London, Edinburgh, Cambridge), Slanguage, The Gimmick, Love's Fowl, The Beginning of August, Refuge. Also: Baltimore Center Stage, Alliance Theater, South Coast Repertory, Seattle Rep, The Old Globe, ACT, Yale Repertory Theater, Walker Arts Center, Lincoln Center Festival, Spoleto, BAM and Williamstown. He also designed the original scenic design for the debut of Johnny Baseball at the American Repertory Theatre Spring 2010.

Of Pask's set design for Hair, Ben Brantley in The New York Times wrote: "Scott Pask's exposed-wall set is the perfect playground for a world in which imagination (aided by chemical substances) provides the décor." Pask has said of his work, "I do love abstracted places, especially one where I can fill it with so much texture."

Pask designed the holiday snow globes for Broadway Cares/Equity Fights AIDS for 2005 and 2009.

== Productions ==
=== Broadway ===
- Urinetown – 2001
- Amour – 2002
- Take Me Out – 2003
- Nine – 2003
- Little Shop of Horrors – 2003
- La Cage Aux Follies – 2004
- The Pillowman – 2005
- Sweet Charity – 2005
- The Wedding Singer – 2006
- The Lieutenant of Inishmore – 2006
- Kiki & Herb: Alive on Broadway – 2006
- Martin Short: Fame Becomes Me – 2006
- The Coast of Utopia (Part 1 - Voyage) – 2006
- The Vertical Hour – 2006
- The Coast of Utopia (Part 2 - Shipwreck) – 2006
- The Coast of Utopia (Part 3 - Salvage) – 2007
- The Ritz – 2007
- November – 2008
- Cry-Baby – 2008
- Les Liaisons Dangereuses – 2008
- Speed-the-Plow – 2008
- Pal Joey – 2008
- Impressionism – 2009
- Hair – 2009
- 9 to 5 – 2009
- A Steady Rain – 2009
- A Behanding in Spokane – 2010
- Promises, Promises – 2010
- Mrs. Warren's Profession – 2010
- Elling – 2010
- The Book of Mormon – 2011
- The House of Blue Leaves – 2011
- I'll Eat You Last: A Chat With Sue Mengers – 2013
- Pippin – 2013
- Macbeth – 2013
- Casa Valentine – 2014
- It's Only a Play – 2014
- Finding Neverland – 2015
- Something Rotten! – 2015
- Airline Highway – 2015
- The Visit – 2015
- An Act of God – 2015
- Blackbird – 2016
- The Father – 2016
- Waitress – 2016
- Oh, Hello on Broadway – 2016
- The Cherry Orchard – 2016
- The Little Foxes – 2017
- The Band's Visit – 2017
- Mean Girls – 2018
- Saint Joan – 2018
- The Prom – 2019
- Who's Afraid of Virginia Woolf? – 2020
- American Buffalo – 2022
- Mr. Saturday Night (musical) – 2022
- 1776 – 2022
- Ain't No Mo' – 2022
- Some Like It Hot – 2022
- Shucked – 2023
- Grey House – 2023

=== Touring ===
- Urinetown (2003–2004)
- Little Shop of Horrors (2004–2006)
- Sweet Charity (2006–2007)
- Hair (2010–2012)
- The Book of Mormon Tours
  - Latter Day Tour (2012–2016)
  - Jumamosi Tour (2012–2020)
- Pippin (2014–2016)
- Finding Neverland (2016–2018)
- Something Rotten! (2017–2018)
- Waitress (2017–2019)
- The Band's Visit (2019–present)
- Mean Girls (2019–present)
- The Prom (upcoming)

=== West End ===
- The Playboy of the Western World – 2011
- Amaluna - Cirque Du Soleil – 2017
- Waitress – 2019
- The Book of Mormon – 2021
- Shucked – 2025

=== Off-Broadway ===
- Love's Fowl – 1998
- The Mineola Twins – 1999
- The Gimmick – 1999
- The Bomb-itty of Errors – 1999
- Boys Don't Wear Lipstick – 2000
- Urinetown – 2001
- Slanglauge – 2001
- The Underpants – 2002
- Take Me Out – 2002
- Amour – 2002
- The Cherry Orchard – 2005
- The Lieutenant of Inishmore – 2006
- Howard Katz – 2007
- Blackbird – 2007
- Saved – 2008
- Hair – 2008
- Wings – 2010
- Silence! The Musical – 2011
- Tribes – 2012
- First Daughter Suite – 2015
- Incognito – 2016
- Dead Poets Society – 2016
- The Band's Visit – 2016
- On the Shore of the Wide World – 2017
- Carmen Jones – 2017
- Socrates – 2019
- Cornelia Street – 2023

=== Other ===
- John Mulaney: Kid Gorgeous at Radio City – 2018

== Awards and nominations ==
Pask won the 1999 Lucille Lortel Award and Henry Hewes Award for his work on The Mineola Twins and the 2001 Bessie Award for Verge.

=== Tony Awards ===
Year	Category	Work	Result
2005	Best Scenic Design in a Play	The Pillowman	Won
2007	Best Scenic Design in a Play	The Coast of Utopia (Parts 1-3)	Won
2008	Best Scenic Design in a Play	Les Liaisons Dangereuses	Nominated
2009	Best Scenic Design in a Musical	Pal Joey	Nominated
2011	Best Scenic Design in a Musical	The Book of Mormon	Won
2013	Best Scenic Design in a Musical	Pippin	Nominated
2018	Best Scenic Design in a Musical	Mean Girls	Nominated
2018	Best Scenic Design in a Musical	The Band's Visit	Nominated
2022	Best Scenic Design in a Play	American Buffalo	Nominated
2023	Best Scenic Design in a Musical	Shucked	Nominated
2023	Best Scenic Design in a Musical	Some Like It Hot	Nominated
2026	Best Scenic Design in a Musical	Schmigadoon!	Pending

=== Drama Desk Awards ===
Year	Category	Work	Result	Ref.
2002	Outstanding Scenic Design of a Play	Take Me Out	Nominated	
2003	Outstanding Scenic Design of a Musical	Amour	Nominated	
2005	Outstanding Scenic Design of a Musical	Sweet Charity	Nominated	
2006	Outstanding Scenic Design of a Musical	The Wedding Singer	Nominated	
2007	Outstanding Scenic Design of a Play	Blackbird	Nominated	
2007	Outstanding Scenic Design of a Play	The Coast of Utopia (Parts 1-3)	Won	
2008	Outstanding Scenic Design of a Play	Les Liaisons Dangereuses	Won	
2009	Outstanding Scenic Design of a Musical	Hair	Nominated	
2009	Outstanding Scenic Design of a Musical	9 to 5	Nominated	
2015	Outstanding Scenic Design of a Musical	The Visit	Nominated	

=== Outer Critics Circle Awards ===
Year	Category	Work	Result	Ref.
2003	Outstanding Scenic Design	Nine	Nominated	
2005	Outstanding Scenic Design	The Pillowman	Nominated	
2007	Outstanding Scenic Design	The Coast of Utopia	Won	
2008	Outstanding Scenic Design	Les Liaisons Dangereuses	Nominated	
2013	Outstanding Scenic Design	Pippin	Nominated	
2015	Outstanding Scenic Design	Something Rotten!	Nominated	
2017	Outstanding Scenic Design	The Little Foxes	Nominated	
2022	Outstanding Scenic Design	American Buffalo	Nominated	
2026	Outstanding Scenic Design	Schmigadoon!	Pending	

=== Lucille Lortel Awards ===
Year	Category	Work	Result	Ref.
1999	Outstanding Scenic Design	The Mineola Twins	Won	
2002	Outstanding Scenic Design	Urinetown	Nominated	
2008	Outstanding Scenic Design	Blackbird	Nominated	
