= Wendall K. Harrington =

American theatrical projection designer

Wendall Keehn Harrington is an American theatrical projection designer and head of projection design at Yale School of Drama, sometimes referred to as 'The Queen of Projections’. She has been considered the nation's leading projection designer for more than three decades.

Credits include over 35 Broadway shows, and numerous awards for her designs.

"In many ways, the modern era of projections on Broadway — and, by extension, in the rest of the theatre — began with Wendall K. Harrington, who designed a number of productions that proved to be technological and aesthetic milestones... It was Harrington's work on the 1992 musical The Who's Tommy that arguably set the stage for the modern projections era."

Many of Harrington's former assistants have gone on to Broadway careers including Zachary Borovay (Rock of Ages), Sage Carter (One Flew Over The Cuckoo's Nest), Michael Clark (Jersey Boys) and Elaine J. McCarthy (Wicked) as well as Hope Hall who went on to serve as the Principal Presidential Videographer and Archive Lead for the Office of Digital Strategy for President Barack Obama.

== Early life and education ==
Harrington was born and raised in Queens, NY. In the 1960s she attended Hunter College, studied at the Graduate Center of the City University of New York as a freshman and studied Art history with Leo Steinberg. She began her career apprenticing as a filmmaker on a number of experimental films before transitioning into advertising at Esquire Magazine, and then projection design in 1978.

== Design career ==
Harrington began her career as a projections designer on Broadway's 1979 production of They're Playing Our Song directed by Robert Moore and starring Robert Klein and Lucie Arnaz. That same year, she also designed Broadway's The Elephant Man, and the musical I Remember Mama. Throughout the years, she continued to serve as projection designer for shows, both on and off-Broadway and nationwide, notably The Will Rogers Follies, Disney's Beauty And The Beast, Company (1995 Rvival), Paul Simon's The Capeman, The Music Man, Children of a Lesser God, The Glass Menagerie, The Human Comedy, The Heidi Chronicles, Into the Woods, A Christmas Carol. and Grey Gardens.

In 1995, she began designing projections for ballet, notably the American Ballet Theatre's Othello, the San Francisco Ballet production of The Nutcracker, Alexei Ratmansky's Anna Karenina for the Mariinsky Ballet and the New York City Ballet's production of Modest Mussorgsky's Pictures at an Exhibition

Harrington continued to expand her projections designing experience on various concerts and tours, including Talking Heads' Stop Making Sense, Simon & Garfunkel's Old Friends Tour, two of Chris Rock's comedy tours (Blind Ambition and No Excuses), and John Fogerty's Deja Vu Tour.

== Other works ==
In 1978 she founded Luminous! Productions, Inc.

Harrington was also responsible for the re-design and re-launch of Esquire magazine in 1986.

She is on the American Theatre Wing's Tony Award Nominating Committee.

== Academic career ==
Harrington began her academic career in 1995 giving seminars in Broadway master lighting classes, which she helped to create, in universities along America's northeastern region, notably New York University, Yale University, Virginia Commonwealth University, and Long Island University. From 2005 to 2009, she served as lecturer on Projection for Performance at the Yale School of Drama's Design Department. In 2009 the co-chairs of the Design Department Ming Cho Lee and Stephen Strawbridge, announced that Wendall was to head the departments new projection concentration. The program began in the fall of 2010 and is one of the first graduate theatre training programs of its kind in the United States.

== Awards and nominations ==
Year	Title	Award	Category	Result
1993	The Who's Tommy	Drama Desk Award	Outstanding Set Design	Won
1993	The Who's Tommy	Outer Critics Circle Award	Outstanding Projection Design	Won
1993	The Who's Tommy	American Theatre Wing Hewes Design Award		Won
1997	Steel Pier	Drama Desk Award	Outstanding Scenic Design of a Musical	Nominated
1998	Ragtime	Drama Desk Award	Outstanding Scenic Design of a Musical	Nominated
2013	Old Hats	Drama Desk Award	Outstanding Projection Design	Nominated

Other

Year	Award	Award
1995	Obie Award	Sustained Excellence in Projections
2000	Michael Merrit Award	For Excellence in Design and Collaboration
2005	League of Professional Theater Women	Ruth Morley Design Award
2014	National Theatre Conference	Person of the Year
2015	USITT	Distinguished Achievement Award in Education
2019	USITT	Distinguished Achievement Award in Digital Media
2024	Tony Awards	Tony Honors for Excellence in Theatre

1980 Multi -Image Murders AMI International Gold Award for Best Concept and Script

1984 50 Who Made a Difference (IFPA Gold Award, The Gold Hugo from Chicago International Film Festival and First Place, Gold Camera from the US Industrial Film Festival)
