= David Zinn =

American costume and scenic designer

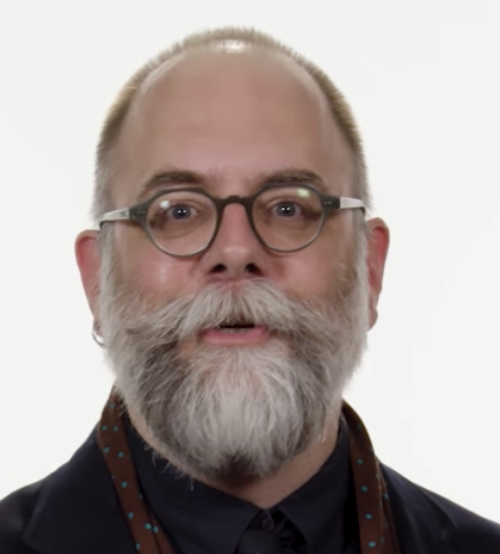
Zinn in 2018.

David Zinn is a costume and scenic designer based in New York, New York. He has been nominated ten times for Tony Awards for both his costume designs and scenic designs. He has won two Best Scenic Design for a Play awards (The Humans in 2016 and Stereophonic in 2024), and one Best Scenic Design in a Musical award (SpongeBob SquarePants in 2018). He has over 80 Off-Broadway credits in his lifetime.

== Early life ==
Zinn was born on Bainbridge Island, near Seattle, Washington. He wanted to be an actor and then moved backstage to start designing in middle school. After using his high school career at Bainbridge High School to work in and around Seattle and Bainbridge Island, Zinn decided to move to New York City. Zinn attended New York University's (NYU) Tisch School of the Arts for his MFA in Design for Stage and Film, where he said he was most influenced by musicals and by avant-garde theatre like the Wooster Group.

== Career ==
Soon after leaving NYU, Zinn went to work as a costume designer for regional theater. After a big break at Santa Fe Opera, which featured his scenic and costume designs, he became known for both aspects of his work. He then went on to work in several Off-Broadway theater for years. He also worked closely with Target Margin Theater Company, headed by David Herskovits and graduate school friend Lenore Doxsee.

In 2010 Zinn worked on Broadway with his costume designs for Xanadu. He then went on to design costumes on Broadway for A Tale of Two Cities, In the Next Room (or The Vibrator Play), Good People, Bengal Tiger at the Baghdad Zoo, Other Desert Cities, The Other Place, Picnic, Rocky, Airline Highway, and An Act of God as well as scenic designs for The Realistic Joneses, Violet, The Real Thing, The Humans, and Present Laughter, and scenic and costume designs for Seminar, The Last Ship, Fun Home, Amélie, and SpongeBob SquarePants: The Musical.

== Awards and nominations ==
=== Theater ===
Year	Award	Show	Result
2008	Obie Award for Sustained Excellence of Costume and Set Design	N/A	Won
2008	Lucille Lortel Awards for Outstanding Scenic Design	The Four of Us	Nominated
2008	Henry Hewes Design Award, Scenic Design	The Four of Us	Nominated
2009	Lucille Lortel Awards for Outstanding Scenic Design	Chairs	Nominated
2010	Tony Award for Best Costume Design	In the Next Room (or The Vibrator Play)	Nominated
2010	Lucille Lortel Awards for Outstanding Scenic Design	The Pride	Nominated
2010	Henry Hewes Design Award, Costume Design	Circle Mirror Transformation	Nominated
2010	Henry Hewes Design Award, Scenic Design	Circle Mirror Transformation	Nominated
2011	Henry Hewes Design Award, Scenic Design	Middletown	Nominated
2011	Lucille Lortel Awards for Outstanding Costume Design	Other Desert Cities	Nominated
2012	Lucille Lortel Awards for Outstanding Scenic Design	The Select (The Sun Also Rises)	Nominated
2012	Henry Hewes Design Award, Scenic Design	The Submission	Nominated
2012	Henry Hewes Design Award, Costume Design	Look Back in Anger	Nominated
2013	Henry Hewes Design Award, Scenic Design	The Flick	Nominated
2013	Drama Desk Award for Outstanding Scenic Design of a Play	The Flick	Nominated
2014	Henry Hewes Design Award, Costume Design	Fun Home	Nominated
2015	Tony Award for Best Scenic Design of a Musical	Fun Home	Nominated
2015	Tony Award for Best Costume Design of a Play	Airline Highway	Nominated
2016	Henry Hewes Design Award, Costume Design	Fondly, Collette Richland	Nominated
2016	Henry Hewes Design Award, Scenic Design	The Humans	Nominated
2016	Lucille Lortel Awards for Outstanding Scenic Design	The Humans	Nominated
2016	Tony Award for Best Scenic Design of a Play	The Humans	Won
2017	Tony Award for Best Costume Design of a Play	A Doll's House, Part 2	Nominated
2018	Tony Award for Best Costume Design of a Musical	SpongeBob SquarePants	Nominated
2018	Tony Award for Best Scenic Design of a Musical	SpongeBob SquarePants	Won
2022	Drama Desk Award for Outstanding Scenic Design of a Musical	Kimberly Akimbo	Nominated
2022	Outer Critics Circle Awards for Scenic Design (Play or Musical)	The Minutes	Nominated
2024	Tony Award for Best Scenic Design of a Play	Jaja's African Hair Braiding	Nominated
2024	Tony Award for Best Scenic Design of a Play	Stereophonic	Won
2024	Tony Award for Best Costume Design of a Play	An Enemy of the People	Nominated
2024	Outer Critics Circle Award for Outstanding Scenic Design (Broadway or Off-Broadway)	Stereophonic	Won
