= Dane Laffrey =

American scenic designer

- Born: Albion, Michigan, U.S.
- Education: National Institute of Dramatic Art
- Occupations: Scenic designer, costume designer
- Years active: 2006 - present
- Notable work: Maybe Happy Ending; Once on This Island; Spring Awakening; Fool for Love
- Awards: Tony Award for Best Scenic Design of a Musical for Maybe Happy Ending, Tony Award Nomination for Best Scenic Design of a Play, A Christmas Carol (2023) Tony Nomination for Best Scenic Design of a Musical, Once On This Island (2018) Obie Award for Sustained Excellence of Set and Costume Design (2017)
- Website: www.danelaffrey.com

Dane Laffrey is an American scenic designer best known for Broadway shows Maybe Happy Ending (2024), Parade (2023), Charles Dickens' A Christmas Carol (2022), Once on This Island (2017), Spring Awakening (2015), and Fool for Love (2015), and Off-Broadway shows The Christians (2015), Cloud Nine (2015), and Rancho Viejo (2016). In 2025, Laffrey won his first Tony Award for Best Scenic Design of a Musical for Maybe Happy Ending after two previous nominations for A Christmas Carol and Once on this Island.

== Early life and education ==
Laffrey was born in Michigan. He attended boarding school at Interlochen Arts Academy for his junior and senior years of high school. During high school, Laffrey formed a friendship with Michael Arden and their longtime creative collaboration was born. In 2002, he relocated to Sydney, Australia to study design at the National Institute of Dramatic Art. He graduated in 2004.

== Career ==
Laffrey first served as scenic designer and costume designer on Darlinghurst Theatre Company's production of Some Explicit Polaroids and Griffin Theatre Company's production of The Cold Child in 2006 in Sydney, Australia. He was nominated for a Sydney Theatre Award for Best Set Design for Some Explicit Polaroids that same year. The following year, he again served in both roles for the production of The Colour of Panic at Sydney Opera House in Sydney, Australia and Det Apne Teater in Oslo, Norway.

In 2007, he relocated to New York City where he began designing sets, costumes, and one time-lighting for multiple Off-Broadway, Off-Off-Broadway, and regional productions. Notable Off-Broadway productions include Lucas Hnath's The Christians, Dan LeFranc's Rancho Viejo, and Caryl Churchill's Cloud Nine. He was nominated for four American Theatre Wing Hewes Design Awards for Off-Broadway productions between 2010 and 2017.

In 2015, he served as the set designer for Manhattan Theatre Club's production of Fool for Love at The Friedman Theatre on Broadway and as both set designer and costume designer for Deaf West Theatre's production of Spring Awakening, performed in American Sign Language, at The Brooks Atkinson Theatre on Broadway. In 2017, he served as set designer for Circle in the Square's production of Once On This Island on Broadway. Laffrey and Michael Arden, the show's director, took a research trip to Haiti which completely transformed his approach to designing the set for the production. Laffrey stated:

"You cannot begin to describe the effect that trip had on me as a person but also in feeling equipped to responsibly bring this work to Broadway in 2017 in a way that was true to the piece and what it portrays ... Hurricane Maria happened in Puerto Rico and the storms that affected those tiny little islands in the Bahamas. We continued to collect and pull those images because it felt like 'Island' is ultimately dealing with, at its core, how you survive in the face of something like that and the restorative power of storytelling. You feel that connection of the human spirit threaded through all these places."

His design for Once On This Island received widespread positive critical acclaim with multiple media outlets describing it as "a fractured paradisiac vision", "lush [and] immersive", "evocative", "ambitious", and "an aesthetic experience unlike anything else on Broadway."

In 2017, Laffrey was awarded the Obie Award for Sustained Excellence of Set and Costume Design.

In 2024, his set design for the Belasco Theatre's production of Maybe Happy Ending left audiences "slack-jawed with awe." The "stunningly executed visual design" mirrors the way humans interact with technology through its “ dazzling iris effects of Dane Laffrey’s sliding-panel" that the New York Times' critic Jesse Green noted as "the most sophisticated I’ve seen.”

Dane Laffrey almost exclusively collaborates with Michael Arden. As a scenic designer and director, Laffrey and Arden have yet to work on a Broadway show without the other. The duo are also co-founders of At Rise Creative, a Tony Award-winning producing partnership.

Laffrey has served as an advisor for Lincoln Center Theatre's LCT3 and as a guest designer at Yale School of Music, the Juilliard School, New York University, Carnegie Mellon University, Interlochen Arts Academy, Western Sydney University, and the National Institute of Dramatic Art.

== Productions ==
=== Broadway productions ===
Year	Production	Position	Notes
2015	Fool for Love	Set Designer	
2015	Spring Awakening	Set Designer, Costume Designer	
2017	Once On This Island	Set Designer	Tony Nomination
2022	A Christmas Carol	Set Designer, Costume Designer	Tony Nomination
2023	Parade	Set Designer	
2024	Maybe Happy Ending	Set Designer	Tony Winner
2025	The Queen of Versailles	Set Designer	
2026	The Lost Boys	Set Designer	Tony Winner

=== Off-Broadway and Off-Off-Broadway productions ===
Year	Production	Position	Notes
2007	Bad Jazz	Set Designer, Costume Designer	
2007	Rag and Bone	Set Designer	
2008	The Rise and Fall of Annie Hall	Set Designer, Costume Designer	
2009	Sixty Miles to Silver Lake	Set Designer, Costume Designer	World premiere
2009	American Sadness	Set Designer, Costume Designer	World premiere
2010	The Boys in the Band	Lighting Designer	Nominated: Drama Desk Award for Outstanding Lighting Design (2010) Nominated: American Theatre Wing Hewes Design Award (2010)
2010	Whida Peru: Resurrection Tango	Set Designer, Costume Designer	
2010	Five Genocides	Set Designer	World premiere
2010	See Rock City...	Set Designer, Costume Designer	
2010	Tigers Be Still	Set Designer, Costume Designer	World premiere
2011	Exit	Set Designer	World premiere
2011	The Other Place	Costume Designer	World premiere
2011	Benefactors	Set Designer	
2011	The Talls	Set Designer	World premiere
2011	The Patsy	Set Designer, Costume Designer	Nominated: American Theatre Wing Hewes Design Award (2012)
2012	The Maids	Set Designer	Nominated: American Theatre Wing Hewes Design Award (2012)
2012	12 Chairs	Costume Designer	World premiere
2012	Bullet for Adolf	Set Designer	
2012	Disgraced	Costume Designer	Won: Pulitzer Prize for Drama (2013)
2012	The Other Josh Cohen	Set Designer	World premiere
2013	Gabriel's Guide to the 48 States	Illustrator	World premiere
2013	Bad Jews	Costume Designer	World premiere
2014	The Hunters	Set Designer, Costume Designer	World premiere
2014	Arlington	Set Designer	World premiere
2014	I Remember Mama	Set Designer	Nominated: American Theatre Wing Hewes Design Award (2014)
2014	The Few	Set Designer	World premiere
2014	American Hero	Set Designer	
2015	Iowa	Set Designer	
2015	King Liz	Set Designer	World premiere
2015	The Christians	Set Designer	
2015	Cloud Nine	Set Designer	
2016	The Glory of the World	Set Designer	World premiere
2016	Indian Summer	Set Designer	World premiere
2016	Sell.Buy.Date.	Set Designer, Costume Designer	World premiere
2016	The Harvest	Set Designer	World premiere
2016	Homos, or Everyone in America	Set Designer	World premiere
2016	Rancho Viejo	Set Designer	World premiere Nominated: American Theatre Wing Hewes Design Award (2017)
2017	The Moors	Set Designer	
2017	Picnic and Come Back Little Sheba	Set Designer	
2017	Strange Interlude	Set Designer, Costume Designer	
2018	Apologia	Set Designer	
2018	Collective Rage: A Play in 5 Betties	Set Designer	
2018	Lewiston / Clarkston	Set Designer	
2018	This Flat Earth	Set Designer	World premiere
2018	Peace for Mary Francis	Set Designer	World premiere
2018	Summer and Smoke	Set Designer	
2019	Dying City	Set Designer	
2019	Greater Clements	Set Designer	World premiere
2019	Hercules	Set Designer	World premiere
2023	Spain	Set Designer	World premiere

=== Regional productions ===
Year	Production	Position	Notes
2008	Reckless	Costume Designer	World premiere
2009	Giant	Set Designer	World premiere
2010	Hurricane	Set Designer, Costume Designer	World premiere
2012	God of Carnage	Set Designer	
2012	Così Fan Tutte	Set Designer, Costume Designer	
2012	Hamlet	Set Designer	
2012	My Wonderful Day	Costume Designer	
2013	Grace, or the Art of Climbing	Set Designer	World premiere
2013	Single Girls Guide	Costume Designer	World premiere
2013	Clybourne Park	Set Designer, Costume Designer	
2013	Fly By Night	Set Designer	World premiere
2013	When the Lights Went Out	Set Designer	World premiere
2013	The Few	Set Designer	World premiere
2013	A Civil War Christmas	Set Designer, Costume Designer	
2014	The Legend of Georgia McBride	Costume Designer	World premiere
2014	The Christians	Set Designer	World premiere
2014	Brownsville Song	Set Designer	World premiere
2014	Fool for Love	Set Designer	
2014	The Wolfe Twins	Set Designer, Costume Designer	World premiere
2014	Uncle Vanya	Set Designer	
2014	Guess Who's Coming to Dinner	Set Designer	
2014	The Last Five Years	Set Designer	
2014	The Theory of Relativity	Set Designer, Costume Designer	World premiere
2015	Spring Awakening	Set Designer, Costume Designer	Nominated: Ovation Award for Best Scenic Design (Large Theatre) (2015)
2015	Be More Chill	Set Designer	World premiere
2015	Dot	Set Designer	World premiere
2015	The Glory of the World	Set Designer	World premiere
2015	Legacy	Set Designer	World premiere
2015	The Christians	Set Designer	
2016	4000 Miles	Set Designer, Costume Designer	
2016	Swimmers	Set Designer, Costume Designer	World premiere
2016	Future Thinking	Set Designer	World premiere
2016	I Remember Mama	Set Designer	
2016	I Was Most Alive with You	Set Designer, Costume Designer	World premiere
2016	The Chinese Room	Set Designer	World premiere
2016	My Fair Lady	Set Designer, Co-Costume Designer	
2016	Collective Rage...	Set Designer	World premiere
2016	Romeo and Juliet	Set Designer	
2016	Merrily We Roll Along	Set Designer, Costume Designer	
2017	We're Gonna Be Okay	Set Designer	World premiere
2017	Recent Alien Abductions in Puerto Rico	Set Designer	
2017	All the Roads Home	Set Designer	World premiere
2017	The Roommate	Set Designer	
2017	Benny and Joon	Set Designer, Costume Designer	World premiere
2018	Zoey's Perfect Wedding	Set Designer	World premiere
2018	Sell.Buy.Date.	Set Designer, Costume Designer	
2018	Dave	Set Designer	World premiere
2018	Annie	Set Designer, Co-Costume Designer	
2018	Dangerous House	Set Designer	
2018	Quack	Set Designer	
2018	A Christmas Carol	Set Designer, Costume Designer	Ovation Award for Best Scenic Design (Large Theatre) (2019)
2019	Benny & Joon	Set Designer, Costume Designer	
2019	Good Boys	Set Designer	
2019	Wink	Set Designer, Costume Designer	World premiere
2019	Ghosts	Set Designer, Costume Designer	
2019	Witch	Set Designer	Nominated: Ovation Award for Best Scenic Design (Large Theatre) (2020)
2019	Little Shop of Horrors	Set Designer	
2020	Maybe Happy Ending	Set Designer	World premiere
2024	Highway Patrol	Set Designer	World premiere
2024	The Queen of Versailles	Set Designer	

=== International productions ===
Year	Production	Position	Notes
2006	Some Explicit Polaroids	Set Designer, Costume Designer	Sydney, Australia Nominated: Sydney Theatre Award for Best Set Design (2006)
2006	The Cold Child	Set Designer, Costume Designer	Sydney, Australia
2007	The Colour of Panic	Set Designer, Costume Designer	World premiere Sydney, Australia and Oslo, Norway
2009	The Roman Spring of Mrs. Stone	Set Designer	World premiere Tokyo, Japan and Osaka, Japan
2022	Guys and Dolls	Set Designer	Tokyo
2024	Hercules	Set Designer	Germany
2025	Hercules	Set Designer	London

=== Television productions ===
Year	Production	Position	Notes
2013-14	The Roast	Set Designer	262 episodes

== Awards and nominations ==
In 2025, Laffrey received a Tony Award for Best Scenic Design of a Musical and a Drama Desk Award for Outstanding Scenic Design of a Musical for his scenic design for Maybe Happy Ending. In 2023, Laffrey was nominated for a Tony Awards for his scenic design for Charles Dickens' A Christmas Carol.

In 2018, Laffrey was nominated for Tony and Drama Desk Awards for his scenic design for Once On This Island.

In 2017, Laffrey was awarded the Obie Award for Sustained Excellence of Set and Costume Design.

In 2006, he was nominated for a Sydney Theatre Award for Best Set Design for Some Explicit Polaroids (2006). In 2010, he was nominated for a Drama Desk Award for Outstanding Lighting Design for The Boys in the Band (2010). In 2015, he was nominated for an Ovation Award for Best Scenic Design (Large Theatre) for Spring Awakening. He also has received multiple nominations for the American Theatre Wing Hewes Design Award, including for The Boys in the Band (2010), The Patsy (2012), The Maids (2012), I Remember Mama (2014), and Rancho Viejo (2017).
