= Robin Wagner (designer) =

American scenic designer (1933–2023)

- Born: Robin Samuel Anton Wagner; August 31, 1933; San Francisco, California, U.S.
- Died: May 29, 2023 (aged 89); New York City, U.S.
- Known for: Scenic design
- Spouses: Paula Kauffman (divorced); Joyce Workman
- Children: 3
- Awards: Tony Award for Best Scenic Design; Drama Desk Award for Outstanding Set Design

Robin Samuel Anton Wagner (August 31, 1933 – May 29, 2023) was an American scenic designer. He won Tony Awards for his work on the Broadway productions of City of Angels, On the Twentieth Century, and The Producers.

== Biography ==
Wagner was born in San Francisco, the son of Phyllis Edna Catherine (née Smith-Spurgeon) and Jens Otto Wagner. His mother was from New Zealand and his father was from Denmark. He attended art school and started his career in theatres in that city with designs for Don Pasquale, Amahl and the Night Visitors, Tea and Sympathy, and Waiting for Godot, among others. In 1958, he relocated to New York City, where he worked on numerous off-Broadway productions before making his Broadway debut as an assistant designer for the Hugh Wheeler play Big Fish, Little Fish in 1961. His first solo project was a short-lived 1966 production of The Condemned of Altona by Jean-Paul Sartre.

Wagner's many Broadway credits include Hair, The Great White Hope, Promises, Promises, Gantry, Jesus Christ Superstar, Seesaw, Mack & Mabel, A Chorus Line, Ballroom, On the Twentieth Century, 42nd Street, Dreamgirls, Song and Dance, City of Angels, Victor/Victoria, Angels in America: Millennium Approaches, Angels in America: Perestroika, The Producers, The Boy from Oz, and Young Frankenstein. His work in London's West End includes Crazy For You and Chess.

Wagner's other theatrical work ranges from off-Broadway and regional theatre productions to ballet and opera, including sets for the Metropolitan Opera, the Vienna State Opera, the Hamburg State Opera, the Royal Swedish Opera, the Royal Opera House at Covent Garden, and the New York City Ballet.

Wagner won the Drama Desk Award for Outstanding Set Design six times out of eleven nominations and the Tony Award for Best Scenic Design three times out of ten nominations.

Wagner served on the Theatre Advisory Committee for the New York International Festival of the Arts, as a trustee of the New York Shakespeare Festival, and taught in the graduate theatre arts program at Columbia University. In 1998, Wagner was inducted into the Theater Hall of Fame.

== Personal life and death ==
Wagner firstly married to Joyce Workman of San Francisco. They had 3 children: Kurt, Leslie, and Christie. Then later married studio executive Paula Wagner (née Kauffman).

Wagner died at his home in New York City on May 29, 2023, at the age of 89.

== Awards and nominations ==
Year	Award	Category	Work	Result	Ref.
1971	Drama Desk Awards	Outstanding Set Design	Lenny	Won	
1972	Tony Awards	Best Scenic Design	Jesus Christ Superstar	Nominated	
1975	Tony Awards	Best Scenic Design	Mack & Mabel	Nominated	
1978	Tony Awards	Best Scenic Design	On the Twentieth Century	Won	
1978	Drama Desk Awards	Outstanding Set Design	On the Twentieth Century	Won	
1982	Tony Awards	Best Scenic Design	Dreamgirls	Nominated	
1982	Drama Desk Awards	Outstanding Set Design	Dreamgirls	Won	
1983	Drama Desk Awards	Outstanding Special Effects	Merlin	Nominated	
1990	Tony Awards	Best Scenic Design	City of Angels	Won	
1990	Drama Desk Awards	Outstanding Set Design	City of Angels	Won	
1992	Tony Awards	Best Scenic Design	Jelly's Last Jam	Won	
1992	Drama Desk Awards	Outstanding Set Design	Crazy for You	Nominated	
1992	Outer Critics Circle Awards	Outstanding Scenic Design	Crazy for You	Won	
1993	Tony Awards	Best Scenic Design	Angels in America	Nominated	
1996	Drama Desk Awards	Outstanding Scenic Design of a Musical	Victor/Victoria	Nominated	
2000	Tony Awards	Best Scenic Design	Kiss Me, Kate	Nominated	
2000	Drama Desk Awards	Outstanding Scenic Design of a Musical	Kiss Me, Kate	Won	
2000	Outer Critics Circle Awards	Outstanding Scenic Design	Kiss Me, Kate	Won	
2001	Tony Awards	Best Scenic Design	The Producers	Won	
2001	Drama Desk Awards	Outstanding Scenic Design of a Musical	The Producers	Won	
2001	Outer Critics Circle Awards	Outstanding Scenic Design	The Producers	Won	
2008	Tony Awards	Best Scenic Design of a Musical	Young Frankenstein	Nominated	
2008	Drama Desk Awards	Outstanding Scenic Design of a Musical	Young Frankenstein	Nominated	
2008	Outer Critics Circle Awards	Outstanding Scenic Design	Young Frankenstein	Nominated	
