= Imagination Playground =

Public park in Manhattan, New York

Coordinates: 40.7062°N 74.0041°W

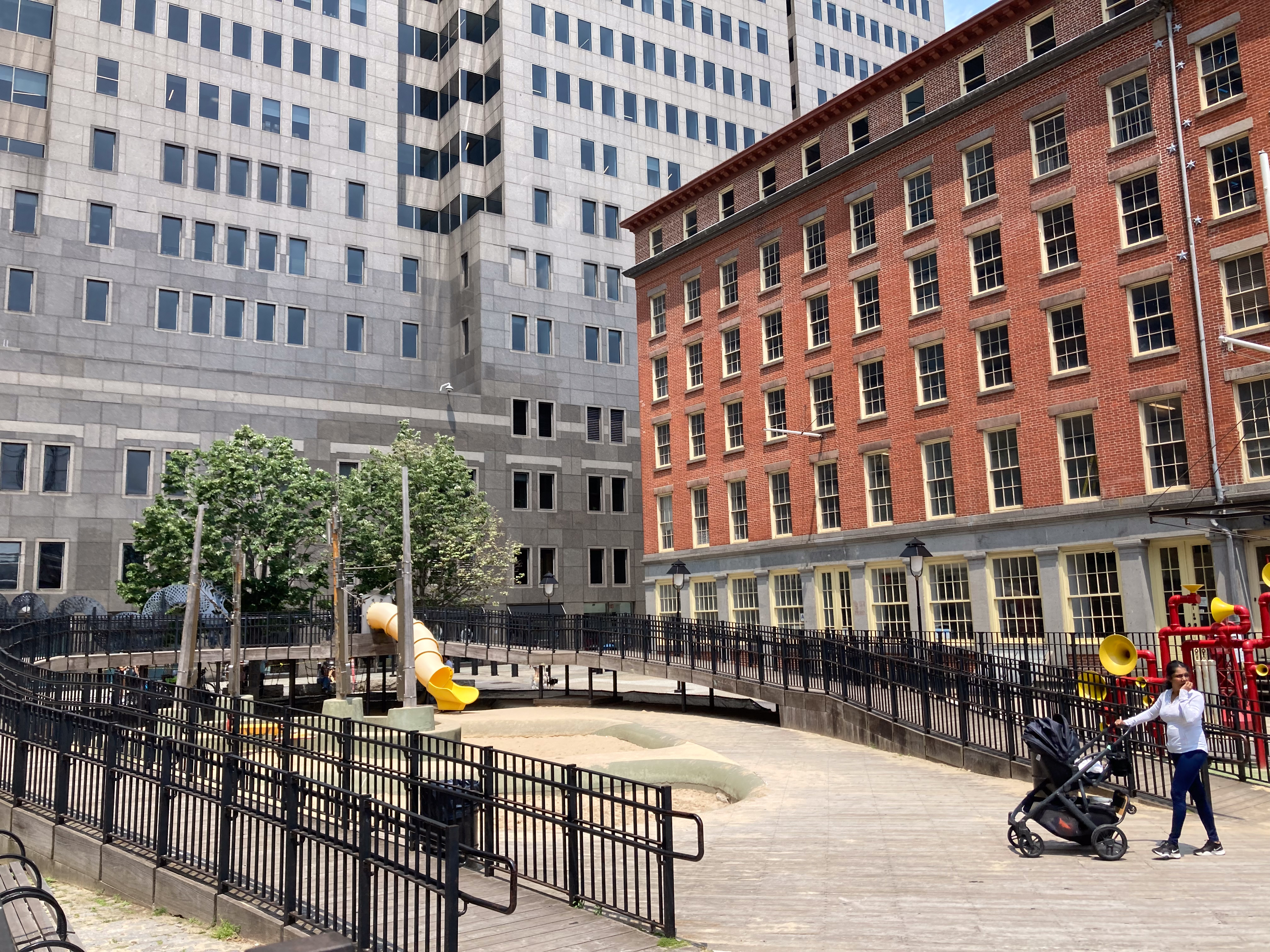
Imagination Playground

Imagination Playground at Burling Slip is a playground on John Street near the South Street Seaport in New York City along South Street. The playground was designed by David Rockwell of Rockwell Group. It opened to the public on July 28, 2010.
