= David Korins =

American set designer (born 1976)

- Born: August 4, 1976 (age 50); Mansfield, Massachusetts, U.S.
- Education: University of Massachusetts, Amherst (BA)
- Spouse: Carolyn Cantor (m. 2003; div. 2018)
- Children: 2
- Awards: Full list

David Korins (born August 4, 1976) is a creative director and the principal designer of Korins Studio.

== Career ==
Korins has designed more than 25 Broadways shows including Hamilton (Tony Award nomination), Dear Evan Hansen, Beetlejuice (Tony Award nomination), and Mrs. Doubtfire. His most recent work includes Here Lies Love (Tony Award nomination) and The Who's Tommy.

David Korins served as creative director for musicians including Lady Gaga, Bruno Mars, Kanye West, Mariah Carey (Number 1 to Infinity, All I Want for Christmas Is You) Andrea Bocelli, and Sia.

Television credits include the 91st Academy Awards (Emmy Award Nomination), 94th Academy Awards (Emmy Award Nomination), Grease: Live (Emmy Award), Watch What Happens Live, and "Elton John: I'm Still Standing – A Grammy Salute."

Korins has created exhibitions for Sotheby's, Gagosian Gallery, and the USC Shoah Foundation. Korins also provides consulting for brands including Google, Spotify, YouTube, and Microsoft.

Korins currently serves as Global Creative Director of Lighthouse Immersive, producing the highest selling ticketed experience in North America 2021, Immersive Van Gogh. Following the success of Van Gogh, he went on to create the Disney Animation Immersive Experience, an experience that celebrates all 100 years of Disney animation using unprecedented access to the entire Disney archive.

== Credits ==
=== Broadway ===
- Mrs. Doubtfire
- The Great Society
- Beetlejuice (Tony Award Nomination)
- Bandstand
- War Paint (Tony Award Nomination)
- Dear Evan Hansen
- Misery
- Hamilton (Tony Award Nomination)
- Motown The Musical
- Vanya and Sonia and Masha and Spike
- Annie
- Bring It On The Musical
- Magic/Bird
- An Evening with Patti LuPone and Mandy Patinkin
- Godspell
- Chinglish
- The Pee-wee Herman Show
- Lombardi
- Passing Strange
- Bridge & Tunnel
- Here Lies Love (Tony Award Nomination)
- The Who's Tommy
- Ragtime
- All In: Comedy About Love
- All Out: Comedy About Ambition
- Dog Day Afternoon (Tony Award nomination)
- Just For Us

=== Television ===
- 94th Academy Awards
- The Big Brunch
- 91st Academy Awards (Emmy Award Nomination)
- Elton John: I'm Still Standing - A Grammy Salute
- Grease: Live (Emmy Award)
- Watch What Happens Live
- Carrie Fisher: Wishful Drinking
- The Webby Awards
- Nickelodeon Halo Awards
- CBS News: 50 Years Later, Civil Rights
- XQ Super School Live
- Tracy Morgan: Bona Fide
- John Oliver's New York Stand-Up Show
- The Climate Reality Project
- Onion News Network
- Make Me a Supermodel

=== Film ===
- Hamilton (2020 film)
- Bandstand
- Blackbird
- Winter Passing
- The Pee-wee Herman Show
- The Heart Short

=== Concerts ===
- Lady Gaga (American Music Awards, Saturday Night Live)
- Bruno Mars (American Music Awards, Saturday Night Live, New Year's Eve - Las Vegas)
- Mariah Carey (Number 1 to Infinity, All I Want for Christmas Is You)
- Kanye West (Coachella, SXSW, Lollapalooza)
- Andrea Bocelli (Cinema World Tour)
- Sia
- Bonnaroo
- Outside Lands

== Personal life ==
Korins was raised in Mansfield, Massachusetts and graduated from University of Massachusetts Amherst. Korins has two children with Carolyn Cantor. Korins and Cantor divorced in 2018.

== Awards and nominations ==
Korins has been awarded an Emmy Award, Lortel Award, an Obie Award for Sustained Excellence in Design, two Drama Desk Awards, three Henry Hewes Design Awards, and four Tony Award nominations for scenic design.

Association	Year	Category	Project	Result	Ref.
Drama Desk Awards	2004	Outstanding Scenic Design of a Play	Blackbird	Nominated	
Drama Desk Awards	2005	Outstanding Scenic Design of a Play	Orange Flower Water	Nominated	
Drama Desk Awards	2007	Outstanding Scenic Design of a Play	Essential Self-Defense	Nominated	
Drama Desk Awards	2007	Outstanding Scenic Design of a Play	Jack Goes Boating	Nominated	
Drama Desk Awards	2008	Outstanding Scenic Design of a Play	Hunting and Gathering	Nominated	
Drama Desk Awards	2009	Outstanding Scenic Design of a Play	Why Torture is Wrong, and the People Who Love Them	Won	
Drama Desk Awards	2019	Outstanding Scenic Design of a Musical	Beetlejuice	Won	
Drama Desk Awards	2023	Outstanding Scenic Design of a Musical	Only Gold	Nominated	
Primetime Emmy Awards (Note: Given out at the Creative Arts Emmy Awards ceremony)	2016	Outstanding Production Design for a Variety Special	Grease: Live	Won	
Primetime Emmy Awards	2019	Outstanding Production Design for a Variety Special	91st Academy Awards	Nominated	
Primetime Emmy Awards	2022	Outstanding Production Design for a Variety Special	94th Academy Awards	Nominated	
Tony Award	2016	Best Scenic Design in a Musical	Hamilton	Nominated	
Tony Award	2017	Best Scenic Design in a Musical	War Paint	Nominated	
Tony Award	2019	Best Scenic Design in a Musical	Beetlejuice	Nominated	
Tony Award	2024	Best Scenic Design in a Musical	Here Lies Love	Nominated	
Tony Award	2026	Best Scenic Design in a Play	Dog Day Afternoon	Nominated	
