= Beetlejuice (musical) =

Musical by Eddie Perfect, Scott Brown and Anthony King

- The Musical. The Musical. The Musical.
- Playbill from the show's original 2019–2020 Broadway run
- Music: Eddie Perfect
- Lyrics: Eddie Perfect
- Book: Scott Brown; Anthony King
- Basis: Beetlejuice by: Michael McDowell; Larry Wilson
- Premiere: October 14, 2018: National Theatre, Washington, D.C.
- Productions: 2018 Washington, D.C. 2019 Broadway; 2022 US tour 2026 US tour 2026 West End

Beetlejuice The Musical. The Musical. The Musical., or simply Beetlejuice, is a musical with music and lyrics by Eddie Perfect and book by Scott Brown and Anthony King. It is based on the 1988 film of the same name. The story concerns a deceased couple who try to haunt the new inhabitants of their former home and call for help from a devious bio-exorcist ghost named after the star Betelgeuse (which is pronounced, and often spelled, "Beetlejuice"), who is summoned by saying his name three times. One of the new inhabitants is a young girl, Lydia, who is dealing with her mother's death and her neglectful father.

The musical had a tryout at the National Theatre, Washington, D.C., in October 2018, prior to opening on Broadway at the Winter Garden Theatre on April 25, 2019. It is produced by Warner Bros. Theatre Ventures (a unit of franchise owner Warner Bros.). Due to the COVID-19 pandemic, the show played its final performance at the Winter Garden on March 10, 2020. It reopened at the Marquis Theatre on Broadway on April 8, 2022, and closed on January 8, 2023. The show reopened again at the Palace Theatre on October 8, 2025 in a limited engagement that ran until January 3, 2026. A US national tour of the production ran from 2022 to 2025.

== Background ==
In 2016, a musical adaptation of the 1988 film Beetlejuice (directed by Tim Burton and starring Geena Davis as Barbara Maitland, Alec Baldwin as Adam Maitland, Winona Ryder as Lydia Deetz and Michael Keaton as Beetlejuice) was reported to be in the works, directed by Alex Timbers and produced by Warner Bros., following a reading with Christopher Fitzgerald in the title role. In March 2017, it was reported that Australian musical comedian Eddie Perfect would be writing the music and lyrics, and Scott Brown and Anthony King would be writing the book of the musical, and that another reading would take place in May, featuring Kris Kukul as musical director. The musical had three readings and two workshops with Alex Brightman as Beetlejuice, Sophia Anne Caruso as Lydia Deetz and Kerry Butler and Rob McClure as the Maitlands. Burton was not consulted in the musical’s production.

== Synopsis ==
=== Act I ===
A group of people at a graveyard mourn the passing of Emily Deetz. Emily's daughter, Lydia, reflects on the death of her mother and her own inability to be noticed by her father, Charles ("Prologue: Invisible"). A millennia-old demon named Beetlejuice appears and mocks the idea of living life to the fullest, as it will all be worthless once death comes ("The Whole 'Being Dead' Thing"). Beetlejuice then addresses the audience directly, explaining that, as a demon, he is invisible to all living beings unless he gets a living person to say his name three times, and reveals that he has come up with a plan to accomplish this.

Beetlejuice then introduces Adam and Barbara Maitland, a normal married couple who desperately want to start a family, who are not emotionally ready and project their insecurities onto their hobbies. As the Maitlands reason to themselves why they are not ready for a child, they fall to their deaths through unstable floorboards in their home ("Ready, Set, Not Yet"). (Note: In the US Tour version, Adam and Barbara instead die via electrocution.) The Handbook for the Recently Deceased falls from the sky, but Beetlejuice burns it, wanting the newly deceased Maitlands to haunt their house and get a living person to say his name three times. When the Maitlands awaken from their fall and realize that they are dead, Beetlejuice reveals himself to the couple and offers to help them adjust to the Afterlife ("The Whole 'Being Dead' Thing, Pt. 2"). He reveals to the Maitlands that a new family, the Deetzes, have bought their house and that in order to remain alone, they will have to scare them away, so the Maitlands accept his help ("The Whole 'Being Dead' Thing, Pt. 3").

While moving in, Charles reveals to Lydia that he wants to start a gated community, using the house as a flagship model home, and is holding a dinner party with some business friends. Lydia expresses her desire for her mother to return, mentioning the fact that nobody seems to care that she is gone. Praying for her to send a sign that she is still there, Lydia vows to make her father acknowledge the fact that tragedy struck their family ("Dead Mom"). In the attic, Beetlejuice is trying to teach the Maitlands how to be scary. Despite his best attempts, they prove to be not scary at all ("Fright of Their Lives"). Beetlejuice becomes frustrated with the couple and abandons them, so they vow to scare the Deetz family away themselves ("Ready, Set, Not Yet" (reprise)). Meanwhile, Delia, a woman whom Charles hired to be Lydia's life coach and his secret lover, tells Lydia how everything happens for a reason but fails to get her in a positive state of mind ("No Reason"). After their session, Lydia meets the Maitlands as they are roaming the house trying to scare the Deetzes. Lydia wants to leave the house just as much as the Maitlands want her family out, so she tries to convince her dad that the house is haunted, only to find out that he and Delia are engaged.

Feeling as if Charles is just trying to replace her mother, Lydia flees to the roof, considering suicide, where a depressed Beetlejuice laments that he will never be seen ("Invisible" (reprise)). He becomes ecstatic however when he realizes Lydia can see him; he advises her not to kill herself, with the intention of getting her to free him from his curse. Lydia teases Beetlejuice but does not say his name the necessary three times. The Maitlands come to check on Lydia, only to be possessed by Beetlejuice into saying positive things about him to further convince Lydia. Upon learning about possession and that any ghost can do it, regardless of skill, Lydia decides not to work with Beetlejuice and instead work with the Maitlands to ruin Charles' party ("Say My Name").

At the dinner party, Barbara and Adam possess Charles, Delia, and their guests ("Day-O (The Banana Boat Song)"). However, instead of being scared, the investors see the ghosts as a selling point; making them more interested in Charles' project. Feeling desperate, Lydia resorts to summoning Beetlejuice. Now visible to the living and able to affect the world around him, he forces the Maitlands to the attic before throwing Charles, Delia, and the investors out of the house, much to Lydia's joy.

=== Act II ===
A Girl Scout named Sky explains to the audience how she has a heart condition where anything shocking could stop her heart but that she is nevertheless excited to be a Girl Scout. She rings the doorbell of the Deetzes' house and is greeted by Lydia, who invites her inside ("Girl Scout"). However, Beetlejuice appears and frightens the poor girl into leaving. He summons more versions of himself to help Lydia scare every visitor that comes to the house ("That Beautiful Sound"). He also tells Lydia that since she lives and works among the dead now, she should also follow their rules, and gives her a copy of the Handbook for the Recently Deceased. Even though Lydia cannot open it due to not being dead, she realizes it could help her reunite with her mother and runs to the attic for Barbara and Adam's help. Feeling alone and betrayed again, Beetlejuice talks with his clones about how he wants to leave the house to finally connect with people now that he can be seen. To achieve this, he decides to trick Lydia into marrying him, which will allow him to roam free in the living world ("That Beautiful Sound" (reprise)).

In the attic, Barbara and Adam help Lydia open the Handbook, when they realize they should have gone straight to the Netherworld instead of remaining in their house. Adam opens the door to the Netherworld, but Barbara shuts it and the Handbook, afraid of leaving the house. Lydia berates them because she hoped to use the book to summon her dead mother and leaves disappointed and angry. Barbara realizes that all of their fear has held her and Adam back, so they decide to become bolder and better people ("Barbara 2.0").

Delia, Charles, and Delia's guru, Otho, re-enter the house to rescue Lydia, bringing a box that can supposedly trap souls. Beetlejuice tricks Lydia by telling her that reading a passage from the book will resurrect her mother, but instead, she begins to exorcise Barbara and is forced to agree to marry Beetlejuice to stop it ("The Whole 'Being Dead' Thing, Pt. 4"). He stops the exorcism and opens a door to the Netherworld to send the Maitlands away for good, but Lydia jumps through the door, with Charles following. Enraged that his plan has failed again, Beetlejuice decides to kill everyone instead ("Good Old Fashioned Wedding").

Lydia and Charles enter the Netherworld and are greeted by Miss Argentina who, along with other Netherworld residents, urges them to return to the living world ("What I Know Now"). They then meet Juno, director of Netherworld Customs and Processing, who soon finds out they are still alive. Lydia runs from Juno and frantically searches for her mother in the Netherworld, but is unable to find her. Charles finds Lydia in distress and reconciles with her ("Home").

The Deetzes return to the house, where Beetlejuice is preparing to kill everyone. Lydia plans to trick him by agreeing to marry him as Charles, Delia, and the Maitlands get the demon ready ("Creepy Old Guy"). The wedding brings Beetlejuice to life, allowing Lydia to stab him and kill him again, making him "Recently Deceased". Lydia and the Maitlands try to send him back to the Netherworld, but Juno appears, reveals herself as Beetlejuice's mother, and tries to take Lydia back with her. Beetlejuice stands up to Juno, having learned to appreciate life in his brief experience. Juno pretends to be moved by Beetlejuice's speech and throws him out of the house. The Maitlands, Charles, and Delia refuse to let Juno take Lydia. Beetlejuice then crashes through the wall riding a sandworm, which eats Juno.

Beetlejuice says his last goodbyes to everyone before leaving. The Deetzes and Maitlands rejoice in their victory and agree to share the house as they clean up and repair the damage. Lydia accepts that although her mother is gone, there is still so much left to enjoy in life ("Jump in the Line").

== Roles and principal casts ==
Character	Washington D.C	Broadway	US Tour	West End
Character	2018	2019	2022	2026
Beetlejuice	Alex Brightman	Alex Brightman	Justin Collette	David Fynn
Lydia Deetz	Sophia Anne Caruso (Note: Caruso was replaced by Elizabeth Teeter when the show reopened in 2022.)	Sophia Anne Caruso	Isabella Esler	Hannah Nordberg
Adam Maitland	Rob McClure	Rob McClure	Will Burton	David Hunter
Barbara Maitland	Kerry Butler	Kerry Butler	Britney Coleman (Note: Coleman was replaced by Megan McGinnis.)	Chelsea Halfpenny
Delia Schlimmer	Leslie Kritzer	Leslie Kritzer	Kate Marilley (Note: Marilley was replaced by Sarah Litzsinger.)	Aimie Atkinson
Miss Argentina (Note: The character of Miss Argentina was made a principal role after tryouts in D.C. This role and Delia were both performed by Kritzer in the first Broadway version, but since the 2022 version, the roles are separate.)	N/A	Leslie Kritzer	Danielle Marie Gonzalez	Vanessa Aurora Sierra
Charles Deetz	Adam Dannheisser	Adam Dannheisser	Jesse Sharp	Alasdair Harvey
Maxie Dean	Danny Rutigliano	Danny Rutigliano	Brian Vaughn	Irvine Iqbal
Maxine Dean / Juno (Note: The role of Mrs. Shoggoth was renamed Juno during tryouts in D.C.)	Jill Abramovitz	Jill Abramovitz	Karmine Alers	Chasity Crisp
Otho	Kelvin Moon Loh	Kelvin Moon Loh	Abe Goldfarb	Richard Frame
Skye the Girl Scout	Dana Steingold	Dana Steingold	Jackera Davis	Rachel MacDougall

== Musical numbers ==
Act I

- "Prologue: Invisible" – Lydia and Ensemble
- "The Whole 'Being Dead' Thing" – Beetlejuice and Ensemble
- "Ready, Set, Not Yet" – Adam and Barbara
- "The Whole 'Being Dead' Thing, Pt. 2" – Beetlejuice and Ensemble
- "The Whole 'Being Dead' Thing, Pt. 3" – Beetlejuice†
- "Dead Mom" – Lydia
- "Fright of Their Lives" – Beetlejuice, Adam, Barbara and Ensemble
- "Ready, Set, Not Yet" (reprise) – Barbara and Adam
- "No Reason" – Delia and Lydia
- "Invisible" (reprise)/"On the Roof" – Beetlejuice
- "Say My Name" – Beetlejuice, Lydia, Barbara and Adam
- "Day-O (The Banana Boat Song)" – Delia, Charles, Maxie, Maxine and Ensemble‡

Act II

- "Girl Scout" – Skye
- "That Beautiful Sound" – Beetlejuice, Lydia and Ensemble
- "That Beautiful Sound" (reprise) – Beetlejuice and Ensemble†
- "Barbara 2.0" – Barbara and Adam
- "The Whole 'Being Dead' Thing, Pt. 4" – Beetlejuice†
- "Good Old Fashioned Wedding" – Beetlejuice†
- "What I Know Now" – Miss Argentina and Ensemble
- "Home" – Lydia
- "Creepy Old Guy" – Lydia, Adam, Barbara, Beetlejuice, Charles, Delia and Ensemble
- "Jump in the Line (Shake, Senora)" / "Dead Mom" (reprise) / "Home" (reprise) / "Day-O" (reprise) – Lydia, Barbara, Adam, Delia and Charles‡

Keys

- † Not included on the original cast recording.
- ‡ Featured in the original 1988 film.

== Productions ==
=== Washington, D.C. (2018) ===
The musical had a pre-Broadway tryout at the National Theatre in Washington, D.C., for a limited run from October 14 to November 18, 2018. The production was directed by Alex Timbers and choreographed by Connor Gallagher, with musical direction by Kris Kukul, scenic design by David Korins, costume design by William Ivey Long, lighting design by Kenneth Posner, sound design by Peter Hylenski, projection design Peter Nigrini, puppet design by Michael Curry, special effects by Jeremy Chernick, illusions by Michael Weber, music producing by Matt Stine and dance arrangements by David Dabbon. The cast included Brightman in the title role alongside Caruso as Lydia, Kerry Butler and Rob McClure as Barbara and Adam, Leslie Kritzer and Adam Dannheisser as Delia and Charles, Jill Abramovitz and Danny Rutigliano as Maxine and Maxie, and Kelvin Moon Loh as Otho.

=== Broadway (2019–2023, 2025–2026) ===
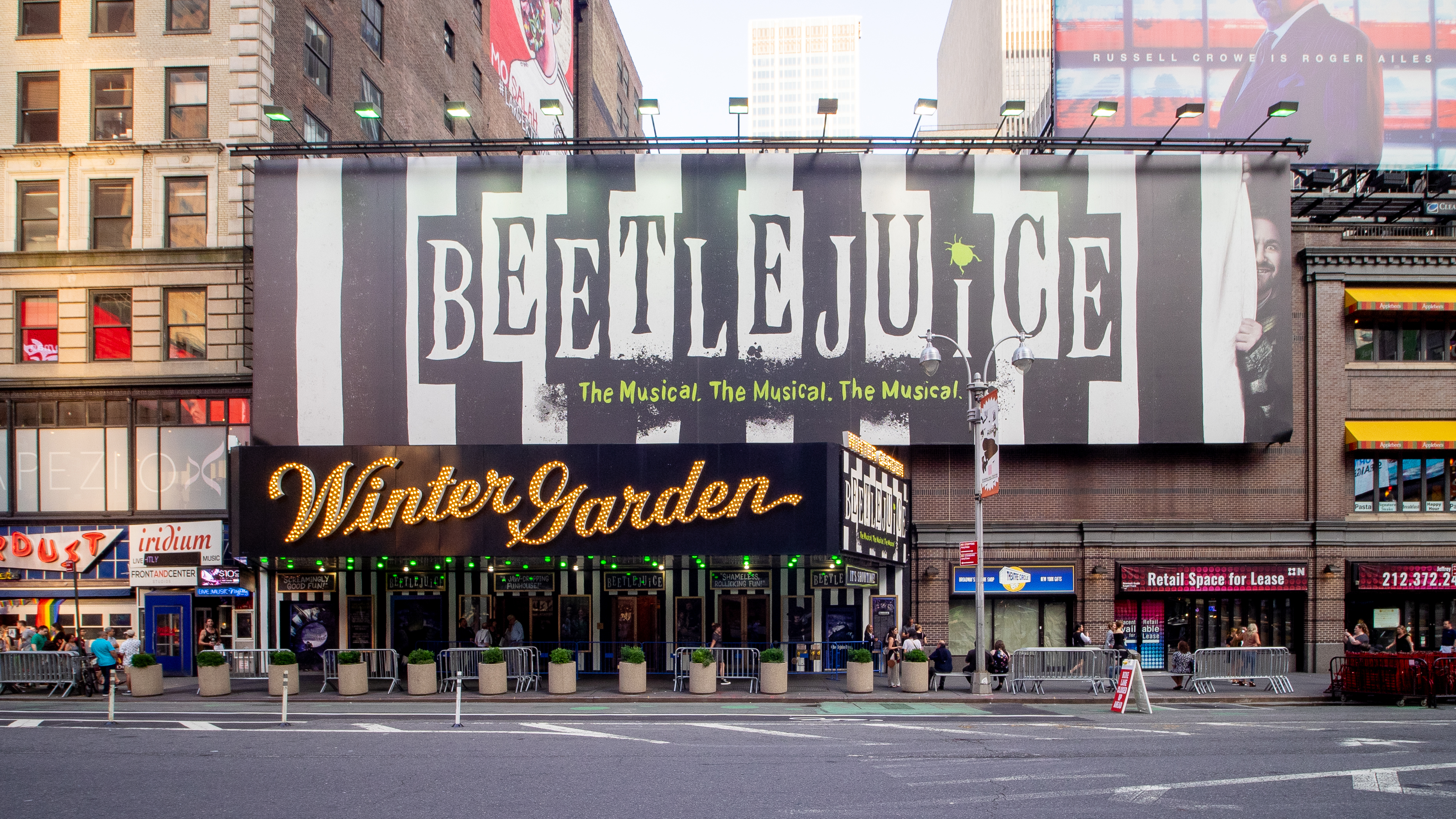
Broadway production at the Winter Garden Theatre

Beetlejuice premiered on Broadway at the Winter Garden Theatre with the same cast and creative team. Previews began on March 28, 2019, with an official opening night on April 25, 2019. David Josefsberg took over the role of Adam in September 2019, and understudy Presley Ryan took over the role of Lydia in February 2020 for the run's last two weeks. Due to a contractual commitment with the theatre, the production was scheduled to close in June 2020, but the run ended on March 10, 2020, when The Broadway League suspended performances of all Broadway productions because of the COVID-19 pandemic.

The production reopened at the Marquis Theatre on April 8, 2022, with Brightman, Butler, Josefsberg, Dannheisser, Kritzer, Loh, Rutigliano and Steingold reprising their roles. Elizabeth Teeter joined the cast as Lydia, with Michelle Aravena as Miss Argentina and Zonya Love as Maxine Dean/Juno. The production closed on January 8, 2023, after a total of 679 performances and 27 previews.

The production played a thirteen-week return engagement at the Palace Theatre on Broadway, with mostly the U.S. national tour cast, which began on October 8, 2025. The cast included touring cast members Justin Collette in the title role, Isabella Esler as Lydia and Will Burton as Adam, with Megan McGinnis as Barbara. The show ended its engagement on January 3, 2026.

=== U.S. national tours ===
The show began its first US national tour at the Carson Center in Paducah, Kentucky, on December 1, 2022, and closed at the Belk Theater in Charlotte, North Carolina, on September 14, 2025. The cast included Collette in the title role, with Esler as Lydia, Burton as Adam and Britney Coleman as Barbara; Timbers again directed and Gallagher choreographed. In Denver, Colorado, U.S. representative Lauren Boebert was escorted from the theater during a September 10, 2023, performance of Beetlejuice. She and her companion were accused of vaping, singing, recording the performance, and groping each other in public, and video recordings of their actions were widely circulated. The tour recouped its original investment after 37 weeks on the road.

After the 2025 Broadway return engagement, a non-equity US national tour started on February 13, 2026, at the Saroyan Theatre in Fresno, California, with performances scheduled through June 2027. The tour is directed by Catie Davis and choreographed by Michael Fatica. It stars Ryan Stajmiger as Beetlejuice and Leianna Weaver as Lydia.

=== International ===
Beetlejuice played in Seoul, South Korea, at the Sejong Center for the Performing Arts, in July and August 2021. Jung Sung-hwa and Yoo Jun-sang shared the title role.

The show opened onboard the Norwegian Viva in September 2023, directed by Catie Davis and choreographed by Connor Gallagher. In 2023 a Japanese version of the musical played in August and September in Shinbashi Enbujo, in Tokyo, the Misonoza in Aichi and the Osaka-Shochikuza in Osaka, with Jesse in the title role, directed by Yuichi Fukuda. The production was restaged in May and June 2025. A Brazilian production played at the Cidade das Artes in Rio de Janeiro, Brazil, from October to December 2023. The production was directed by Renata Borges Pimenta in a translation by Claudio Botelho and starred Eduardo Sterblitch as Beetlejuice. The show moved to São Paulo in 2024.

An Australian production began previews on May 7 and opened on May 17, 2025, at the Regent Theatre in Melbourne, with Timbers directing. The show's composer and lyricist Eddie Perfect, an Australian, played the title role, alongside Karis Oka as Lydia, Elise McCann as Barbara, Rob Johnson as Adam, Tom Wren as Charles, and Erin Clare as Delia. The show closed on September 11, 2025.

A Czech production opened in November 2024 at the Karlín Music Theatre in Prague, directed by Gabriel Barre. A Polish production premiered on September 13, 2025, at Syrena Theatre in Warsaw. A United Arab Emirates production ran in November 2025 at the Etihad Arena in Abu Dhabi with Andy Karl in the title role. A brief Australian run began in June 2026 at the Queensland Performing Arts Centre in Brisbane, with Karl reprising the title role. The production closed, earlier than scheduled, on July 5, 2026.

=== West End (2026) ===
A West End production at the Prince Edward Theatre began in May 2026 with David Fynn in the title role (and Tom Xander as alternate Beetlejuice), Hannah Nordberg as Lydia (and Daisy Harrison as alternate Lydia), David Hunter as Adam, Chelsea Halfpenny as Barbara, Aimie Atkinson as Delia, Alasdair Harvey as Charles, Chasity Crisp as Maxine, Richard Frame as Otho, Irvine Iqbal as Maxie, Rachel Macdougall as Girl Scourt and Vanessa Aurora Sierra as Miss Argentina. Direction is again by Timbers, choreography by Gallagher with sets by Korins, costumes by Long, lighting by Posner, and sound by Hylenski. The production was scheduled to play until April 2027 but later announced it would close prematurely in January 2027 due to poor ticket sales.

== Critical response ==
Ben Brantley, in The New York Times, wrote: "Invisibility is definitely not among this show's problems; overcompensating from the fear that it might lose an audience with a limited attention span is. Though it features a jaw-droppingly well-appointed gothic funhouse set (by David Korins, lighted by Kenneth Posner), replete with spooky surprises, this show so overstuffs itself with gags, one-liners and visual diversions that you shut down from sensory overload."

Sara Holdren, in New York Vulture, wrote that the show "openly embraces the theme park-y aspects of an enterprise like the one it's engaged in. True to its source material, it's loud, it's cheeky, and it's all about excess. It's also – thanks in large part to Alex Brightman's spot-on performance as the incorrigible titular ghoul – a pretty fun time." Nick Romano from Entertainment Weekly commented that the musical "was crafted from a group of creative minds who clearly love the source material, though not all of it works. There are still second act problems and a song list void of any real bops, but it's a fun time for the Burton novice and pure fan service for the Burton stans, thanks in large part to the titular puckish undead spirit breathing life into a Broadway experiment that could've been dead in the water."

Peter Marks, theatre critic for The Washington Post, was pleased by the changes made during the show's transition to Broadway: "during its tryout run in November in Washington's National Theatre, the blithe, dizzily antic spirit of the movie was suffocating under the weight of sophomoric, phallic gags. This reworked incarnation, under Alex Timbers's direction, breathes slightly more enjoyably even as it remains too faithful to the pumped-up inclinations of book writers Scott Brown and Anthony King and composer-lyricist Eddie Perfect. This means that the eager-to-please quotient of a musical about the quest by a bevy of souls, alive and dead, to alleviate loneliness, is still amped up a bit too frantically. This may be of more concern to overly entertained theater analysts than to those musical-theater enthusiasts who thrive on the supercharged exertions of an ensemble on hyperdrive. On a measurement scale of energy-output-per-minute, high-octane Beetlejuice would now be the safest ticket in town."

Frank Rizzo wrote in Variety: "Keeping things entertaining enough are the off-the-wall humor, endless visuals and aural delights, tuneful music and wicked lyrics of Perfect... Brightman is matched in star presence and musical chops by Caruso, as she travels to hell and back without losing her way. McLure [sic] and Butler find big laughs, too, as the sweet – but not too sweet – a couple who finally find a reason to live after they've died. Dannheisser, as Lydia's dad, grounds the role with sincerity without forgoing the loopy side, too."

=== Recordings ===
Ghostlight Records released the original Broadway cast recording digitally on June 7, 2019, which sold well. Ghostlight released Beetlejuice – The Demos! The Demos! The Demos! on October 30, 2020, compiling material composer-lyricist Perfect recorded between 2014 and 2019 during the development of the musical. It features both final and cut songs from the show as well as commentary by Perfect.

Excited Animal Records, a music label by Eddie Perfect, released Beetlejuice the Musical Live at the Regent Theatre Melbourne on October 30, 2026. It was a live recording of the 2025 Melbourne run's opening night and was accompanied by a limited vinyl record and a CD release.

== Awards and nominations ==
=== Broadway production ===
Year	Award	Category	Nominee	Result
2019	Tony Awards	Best Musical		Nominated
2019	Tony Awards	Best Book of a Musical	Scott Brown & Anthony King	Nominated
2019	Tony Awards	Best Original Score	Eddie Perfect	Nominated
2019	Tony Awards	Best Performance by an Actor in a Leading Role in a Musical	Alex Brightman	Nominated
2019	Tony Awards	Best Scenic Design in a Musical	David Korins	Nominated
2019	Tony Awards	Best Costume Design in a Musical	William Ivey Long	Nominated
2019	Tony Awards	Best Lighting Design in a Musical	Kenneth Posner & Peter Nigrini	Nominated
2019	Tony Awards	Best Sound Design of a Musical	Peter Hylenski	Nominated
2019	Outer Critics Circle Awards	Outstanding Set Design (Play or Musical)	David Korins	Won
2019	Outer Critics Circle Awards	Outstanding Costume Design (Play or Musical)	William Ivey Long	Nominated
2019	Outer Critics Circle Awards	Outstanding Projection Design (Play or Musical)	Peter Nigrini	Nominated
2019	Outer Critics Circle Awards	Outstanding Featured Actress in a Musical	Leslie Kritzer	Nominated
2019	Drama League Awards	Founder's Award for Excellence in Directing	Alex Timbers	Won
2019	Drama League Awards	Outstanding Production of a Broadway or Off-Broadway Musical		Nominated
2019	Drama League Awards	Distinguished Performance Award	Alex Brightman	Nominated
2019	Drama League Awards	Distinguished Performance Award	Leslie Kritzer	Nominated
2019	Drama Desk Awards	Outstanding Featured Actress in a Musical	Leslie Kritzer	Nominated
2019	Drama Desk Awards	Outstanding Book of a Musical	Scott Brown & Anthony King	Nominated
2019	Drama Desk Awards	Outstanding Scenic Design of a Musical	David Korins	Won
2019	Drama Desk Awards	Outstanding Costume Design of a Musical	William Ivey Long	Nominated
2019	Drama Desk Awards	Outstanding Projection Design	Peter Nigrini	Nominated
2019	Drama Desk Awards	Outstanding Wig and Hair Design	Charles G. LaPointe	Nominated
2019	Drama Desk Awards	Outstanding Puppet Design	Michael Curry	Nominated
2019	Theatre World Awards	Outstanding New York City Stage Debut Performance	Sophia Anne Caruso	Won

== In popular culture ==
In October 2020, Brightman voiced Beetlejuice in an episode of the animated series Teen Titans Go!.
