= Anna Louizos =

American scenic designer and art director (1957–2026)

- Born: June 24, 1957; Marysville, California, U.S.
- Died: August 25, 2026 (aged 69); New York City, U.S.
- Occupation: Scenic designer

Anna Louizos (June 24, 1957 – August 25, 2026) was an American scenic designer and art director. She was known for her Tony Award-nominated sets for the musicals In the Heights, High Fidelity and The Mystery of Edwin Drood as well as the London, Broadway, Las Vegas, and touring productions of Avenue Q. Louizos was represented on Broadway with School of Rock at The Winter Garden Theatre, Holiday Inn, Honeymoon in Vegas, Dames at Sea, Cinderella at the Broadway Theatre in 2013–15. Other Broadway designs include Curtains (2007), It Shoulda Been You, White Christmas on Broadway at the Marquis Theatre,The Performers, Steel Magnolias and Golda's Balcony.

== Early life and training ==
Louizos was born on June 24, 1957, in Yuba City, California, where she also grew up. She saw her first Broadway musical, Applause with Lauren Bacall, at age fifteen. Interested in performing as an actress, Louizos studied at Mills College, Oakland, before transferring to New York University to complete a degree in acting. "Instructors recognized her talent as a visual artist, and progressively her post-graduate focus shifted to design," wrote Andy Smith of Broadway Cares/Equity Fights AIDS. She lived for many years in the East Village, Manhattan, New York City. She received an MFA in Scenic design from NYU Tisch School of the Arts.

== Career ==
Louizos served as art director at the 47th Tony Awards in 1993, and was associate scenic designer for the Broadway musical The Red Shoes in December of that year. She continued as an associate designer with the Broadway production of The Scarlet Pimpernel (1997) at the Minskoff and Neil Simon Theatres. From April to June 2000, she was associate scenic designer for the comedic play Taller Than a Dwarf and Uncle Vanya on Broadway.

Her first major production credit as scenic designer came in 2003, with the critically acclaimed musical Avenue Q. Written by Jeff Whitty, Robert Lopez and Jeff Marx, the musical premiered off-Broadway before opening on Broadway at the John Golden Theatre. Wrote one reviewer of Louizos' sets: "[She] provides an adaptable row of ramshackle houses that convey a down-at-heel atmosphere and somehow change character to fit the mood, rather like glorified dolls' houses."

Following the opening of Avenue Q, Louizos became art director for eight episodes of the 2003 television series Sex and the City. Her second Broadway scenic design was for the play Golda's Balcony at the Helen Hayes Theatre in 2003. Subsequent credits include the Broadway shows Steel Magnolias (2005), High Fidelity (2006), Curtains (2007), In the Heights (2007), All About Me (2010), and Baby It's You! (2011).

She designed sets for the Manhattan Theatre Club 2008 production of To Be or Not to Be on Broadway at the Samuel J. Friedman Theatre.

Other scenic design work includes the regional premieres of Minsky's, and Vanities, the Musical, as well as the off-Broadway productions of Altar Boyz and Tick, Tick... Boom!. Other off Broadway productions include Sons of the Prophet, Olive and the Bitter Herbs, Crimes of the Heart, and The Foreigner.

In November 2008, Louizos designed sets for the musical White Christmas on Broadway at the Marquis Theatre and multiple productions in the US since 2004, as well as the UK production. A year later, in November 2009, the musical returned to Broadway in a revival production at the Marquis Theatre. She most recently served as the scenic designer for the Broadway musical Cinderella, which opened in March 2013 at the Broadway Theatre. In December 2014, it was announced that her next project would be Broadway-bound School of Rock.

== Death ==
After a series of accidents suffered during a 2025 vacation in Greece and illnesses, Louizos died on August 25, 2026, at the age of 69. She was survived by her longtime partner, Robyn Goodman.

== Awards and nominations ==
Tony Awards

- The Mystery of Edwin Drood (2013, Best Scenic Design of a Musical) (nominee)
- In the Heights (2008, Best Scenic Design of a Musical) (nominee)
- High Fidelity (2007, Best Scenic Design of a Musical) (nominee)

Drama Desk Awards

- Scotland PA (2020, Outstanding Set Design of a Musical)(nominee)
- Irving Berlin's White Christmas (2009, Outstanding Set Design of a Musical) (nominee)
- In the Heights (2007, Outstanding Set Design of a Musical) (nominee)
- Curtains (2007, Outstanding Set Design of a Musical) (nominee)
- High Fidelity (2007, Outstanding Set Design of a Musical) (nominee)

Lucille Lortel Awards

- In Transit (2011, Best Set Design) (nominee)
- In the Heights (2007, Best Set Design) (nominee)
- Avenue Q (2003, Best Set Design) (nominee)

Emmy Awards

- The 46th Annual Tony Awards (1993, Outstanding Individual Achievement in Art Direction for a Variety or Music Program) (nominee)
