= Beowulf Boritt =

American set designer

- Boritt in 2026
- Education: Vassar College (AB); New York University (MFA)
- Occupation: Scenic designer
- Spouse: Mimi Bilinski
- Awards: Tony Award for Best Scenic Design in a Play (2014); Tony Award for Best Scenic Design in a Musical (2023)
- Website: beowulfborittdesign.com

Beowulf Boritt is a New York City-based scenic designer for theater. He is known for his scenic design for the play Act One, which earned him the 2014 Tony Award for Best Scenic Design in a Play.

== Early life ==
Boritt was born to American Civil War scholar Gabor Boritt and his wife, Elizabeth Boritt, an aspiring opera singer. Gabor Boritt fled Hungary for South Dakota after the failure of the Hungarian Revolution of 1956. The family resided in Gettysburg, Pennsylvania. Boritt has two brothers, film producer Jake Boritt and Daniel Boritt, executive director of the Indiana Wildlife Foundation.

Boritt cites his grandmother Anita Marie Wilson Norseen Hooker as a major inspiration for designing sets, as she was an artist and scenic designer at Wellesley College but was told that it was not appropriate for a woman to do in the 1930s. "She encouraged me artistically to express myself and bought me my first set of oil paints. My parents encouraged me, yes, but my grandmother was the big influence."

Boritt went on to receive his A.B. from Vassar College where he pursued a degree in literature, not believing he could make it in scenic design:

I honestly don't think I meant to become a professional designer. I'm a little disingenuous for saying that, but I don't think I thought it was possible. I don't know if there was ever a moment where I said I'm going to pursue this. I thought I might become a college professor and teach set design somewhere. To do that I needed a master's degree. I started designing around the city a little bit while I was in graduate school and one thing led to another and I had several lucky breaks and started building a career.

Then, he received his M.F.A. from New York University's Tisch School of the Arts program for design for stage and film.

He is married to actress Mimi Bilinski.

== Career ==
After meeting Boritt at NYU, Hal Prince asked him to design Daisy Prince's production of The Last Five Years and later Prince's production Paradise Found. Soon after, designing The 25th Annual Putnam County Spelling Bee launched his career on Broadway.

Since then, he has designed over 20 Broadway shows, including his Tony Award-winning Act One and -nominated The Scottsboro Boys.

In 2007, he was awarded the Obie Award for sustained excellence in scenic design. He has also won the AUDELCO Award for set design in 2002 and the 2012 Tony Award for Best Scenic Design.

In 2015, Boritt designed the set for the Broadway debut of Helen Edmundson's play Thérèse Raquin.

In 2016, Boritt was featured in a Microsoft Windows 10 commercial that aired nationwide.

In 2016, he designed Chinese and American cooperated Broadway shows 'Jay Chou's The Secret'.

In 2017, he was featured in a New York Times article about his renovation of his home using his scenic design expertise.

== Awards and nominations ==
Year	Award	Show	Result	Ref.
2002	AUDELCO Set Design	Saint Lucy's Eyes	Won	
2002	Drama Desk Award for Outstanding Set Design	The Last Five Years	Nominated	
2004	Barrymore Award	Talley's Folly	Nominated	
2006	Hewes Design Award for Scenic Design	The Other Side	Nominated	
2006	Lucille Lortel Award for Outstanding Scenic Design	The Other Side	Nominated	
2007	Obie Award for Sustained Excellence in Set Design		Won	
2007	Hewes Design Award for Scenic Design	LoveMusik	Nominated	
2007	Drama Desk Award for Outstanding Set Design	LoveMusik	Nominated	
2008	Drama Desk Award for Outstanding Set Design	Spain	Nominated	
2008	Barrymore Award	Art	Won	
2009	Hewes Design Award for Scenic Design	The Toxic Avenger	Nominated	
2009	Lucille Lortel Award for Outstanding Scenic Design	Animals Out of Paper	Nominated	
2010	Outer Critics Circle Award for Best Set Design	Sondheim on Sondheim	Nominated	
2010	Hewes Design Award for Scenic Design	Sondheim on Sondheim	Nominated	
2011	Tony Award for Best Scenic Design	The Scottsboro Boys	Nominated	
2012	Tina Award for Best Scenic Design	The Blue Flower	Won	
2013	Hewes Design Award for Scenic Design	All in the Timing	Nominated	
2013	Hewes Design Award for Scenic Design	If There Is I Haven't Found it Yet	Nominated	
2013	Lucille Lortel Award for Outstanding Scenic Design	If There Is I Haven't Found it Yet	Nominated	
2014	Tony Award for Best Scenic Design of Play	Act One	Won	
2014	Outer Critics Circle Award for Best Set Design	Act One	Nominated	
2016	Tony Award for Best Scenic Design of Play	Thérèse Raquin	Nominated	
2016	Outer Critics Circle Award for Best Set Design	Thérèse Raquin	Nominated	
2022	Outer Critics Circle Award for Outstanding Scenic Design	Flying Over Sunset	Nominated	
2022	Tony Award for Best Scenic Design in a Musical	Flying Over Sunset	Nominated	
2022	Tony Award for Best Scenic Design in a Play	POTUS	Nominated	
2023	Tony Award for Best Scenic Design of a Musical	New York, New York	Won	
2023	Drama Desk Award for Outstanding Scenic Design in a Musical	New York, New York	Won	
2023	Outer Critics Circle Award for Outstanding Scenic Design (Play or Musical)	New York, New York	Won	
2023	Outer Critics Circle Award for Outstanding Video or Projection Design (Play or Musical) (with Christopher Ash)	New York, New York	Nominated	

== Other ==
In 2022 Boritt founded The 1/52 Project, a financial grant program to encourage early career designers from historically excluded groups.
