= Derek McLane =

American set designer

Derek McLane (born June 14, 1958, in London, England) is an American set designer for theatre, opera, and television. He graduated with a BA from Harvard College and an MFA from the Yale School of Drama. McLane has designed more than 350 productions at theaters throughout the United States and around the world, for Broadway, Off-Broadway and major live television. He won Tony Award for ‘Moulin Rouge!’and‘33 Variations’. He won Emmy Awards for the 2014 Oscars and ‘Hairspray Live!’, as well as 3 Art Directors Guild Awards.

== Career ==
Broadway credits include: Just In Time (2025),Death Becomes Her (2024),Purlie Victorious (2023),MJ (2022),Moulin Rouge! (2020), A Soldier's Play (2020), Gigi (2015), Beautiful: The Carole King Musical (2014), 33 Variations (Tony Award, Best Scenic Design 2009), Grease, The Pajama Game (2006 Tony Nomination); The Threepenny Opera, Little Women, I Am My Own Wife (Tony Award, Best Play); Intimate Apparel (2005 Lortel Award), Barefoot in the Park, Lestat, The Women, Present Laughter, London Assurance, Holiday, Honour, Summer and Smoke, and Three Sisters. In 2026, McLane had 6 Broadway shows running simultaneously (Moulin Rouge, MJ, Death Becomes Her, Just in Time, The Balusters, and Celebrity Autobiography)

Off-Broadway credits include: The Adding Machine (2026),Buried Child (2016), Into the Woods (2015), Posterity (2015), The Scene, The Voysey Inheritance (2007 Lortel Award), Two Trains Running, Prime of Miss Jean Brodie, Macbeth (Shakespeare in the Park), Hurlyburly, Abigail's Party, The Great American Trailer Park Musical, Aunt Dan and Lemon, The Credeaux Canvas and Rafta, Rafta....

McLane was the scenic designer for all of the productions of the entire Sondheim Celebration at the Kennedy Center in Washington, DC. in 2002.

His designs in opera and theatre have also appeared in London, Paris, Dublin, Glasgow, Moscow, Kraków, Sydney, Caracas and Warsaw. For television, McLane designed the 2013, 2014, 2015, 2016, 2017 and 2018 Academy Awards, as well as the live television productions of The Sound of Music Live!, Peter Pan Live! and The Wiz Live!.

He has collaborated with renowned directors such as Alex Timbers, Kenny Leon, Rob Ashford, Marc Bruni, Scott Elliott, Moisés Kaufman, Kathleen Marshall, Daniel Sullivan, Mark Brokaw, James Lapine and Michael Mayer.

McLane is on the board of directors for The New Group and Fiasco Theater Company, and is also a mentor with the Theatre Development Fund's Open Doors Program.

With his first wife, McLane has three children; he is currently married to Sony Pictures Entertainment executive Lia Vollack.

== Awards and nominations ==
Tony Award Nomination: Best Scenic Design of a Musical: Just In Time • 2025

Tony Award Nomination: Best Scenic Design of a Musical: Death Becomes Her • 2025

Tony Award Nomination: Best Scenic Design of a Play: Purlie Victorious • 2024

Tony Award Nomination: Best Scenic Design of a Musical: MJ • 2022

Tony Award: Best Scenic Design of a Musical: MOULIN ROUGE! • 2021

Drama Desk Award: MOULIN ROUGE! • 2020

Art Directors Guild: 90th ACADEMY AWARDS • 2019

Emmy Award Nomination: 90th ACADEMY AWARDS • 2018

Emmy Award: HAIRSPRAY LIVE! • 2017

Art Directors Guild Nomination: 88th ACADEMY AWARDS • 2017

Art Directors Guild Nomination: HAIRSPRAY LIVE! • 2017

Emmy Award Nomination: 88th ACADEMY AWARDS • 2016

Emmy Award Nomination: The WIZ LIVE! • 2016

Drama Desk Nomination: FULLY COMMITTED • 2016

Art Directors Guild Award: Excellence in Production Design • 2015

Art Directors Guild Award: 87th ACADEMY AWARDS • 2014

Emmy Award: 86th ACADEMY AWARDS • 2014

Drama Desk Nomination: FOLLIES • 2012

Drama Desk Award: ANYTHING GOES • 2011

Tony Award Nomination: ANYTHING GOES • 2011

Tony Award Nomination: Best Scenic Design of a Musical: RAGTIME • 2010

Lucille Lortel Award Nomination: Outstanding Scenic Design: A LIE OF THE MIND • 2010

Garland Award: Excellence in Southland Theater - Backstage: BENGAL TIGER AT THE BAGHDAD ZOO • 2010

Tony Award Nomination: Best Scenic Design of a Play: 33 VARIATIONS • 2009

Henry Hewes Design Award: Best Scenic Design: 33 VARIATIONS • 2009

Henry Hewes Design Award Nomination: Best Scenic Design: RUINED • 2009

Vivian Robinson Audelco - 'The Viv' : Set Design Award: RUINED • 2009

Drama Desk Nomination: 33 VARIATIONS • 2009

Outer Critics Circle Award Nomination: 33 VARIATIONS • 2009

Henry Hewes Design Award Nomination: Best Scenic Design: RAFTA, RAFTA • 2008

Lucille Lortel Award Nomination: Outstanding Scenic Design: 10 MILLION MILES • 2008

San Diego Critics Circle Noel Award: Outstanding Scenic Design: 33 VARIATIONS • 2008

Drama Desk Nomination: 10 MILLION MILES • 2008

Dora Award, Toronto: ELEKTRA • 2007

Lucille Lortel Award: THE VOYSEY INHERITANCE • 2007

Outer Critics Circle Award Nomination: THE VOYSEY INHERITANCE • 2007

Tony Award Nomination: Best Scenic Design of a Musical: THE PAJAMA GAME • 2006

Lucille Lortel Award Nomination: ABIGAIL'S PARTY • 2006

Drama Desk Nomination: ABIGAIL'S PARTY • 2006

Lucille Lortel Award: INTIMATE APPAREL • 2005

Drama-Logue Award: INTIMATE APPAREL • 2005

Audelco Award: INTIMATE APPAREL • 2004

OBIE Award: Sustained Achievement 2004

Lucille Lortel Award: I AM MY OWN WIFE • 2004

Drama Desk Nomination: I AM MY OWN WIFE • 2004

Michael Merrit Award for Collaboration: : CHICAGO • 2003

Drama Desk Nomination: THE WOMEN • 2002

Drama Desk Nomination: EAST IS EAST • 2000

Drama Desk Nomination: MISALLIANCE • 1998

Drama-Logue Award: HARMONY • 1997

OBIE Award: Sustained Achievement 1997

Drama Desk Nomination: PRESENT LAUGHTER • 1997

Drama Desk Nomination: THE MONOGAMIST • 1996
