= Michael Yeargan =

Michael H. Yeargan is an American set designer for theatre and opera.

Yeargan is a professor of Stage Design at the Yale School of Drama and has designed for opera companies all over the world, including the Washington Opera and the Dallas Opera. His scenic designs for Broadway include South Pacific, Cymbeline, Awake and Sing!, Seascape, The Light in the Piazza, The Gershwins' Fascinating Rhythm, Ah, Wilderness!, Hay Fever, It Had to Be You, A Lesson from Aloes, Dirty Linen & New-Found-Land, Something Old, Something New, Me Jack, You Jill, The Ritz, Bad Habits, and Women on the Verge of a Nervous Breakdown.

Yeargan also designed sets for A Day in the Death of Joe Egg and The Illusion at the Dallas Theatre Center.
