= Allen Moyer =

American set designer (born 1958)

Allen Moyer (born 1958) is an American set designer particularly known for his work in operas and Broadway musicals.

Moyer grew up in Schuylkill Haven, Pennsylvania. After two years at Albright College in Reading, Pennsylvania, he transferred to Pennsylvania State University, where he earned a Bachelor of Arts degree followed by a Master of Fine Arts degree from New York University/Tisch School of the Arts, where he studied with Oliver Smith and John Conklin. His designs have appeared in celebrated productions at the New York City Opera, the San Francisco Opera, the Santa Fe Opera, the Opera Theatre of Saint Louis, and the Seattle Opera. He notably staged the world premiere of Ricky Ian Gordon's The Grapes of Wrath at the Minnesota Opera in 2007. He designed his first set for the Metropolitan Opera for their new production of Gluck's Orfeo ed Euridice which premiered on May 2, 2007.

Moyer worked for the first time on Broadway for the 1996 revival of Tartuffe. He has since designed sets for thirteen more Broadway shows, notably winning an Obie Award and garnering Tony Award and Drama Desk Award nominations for his work on the 2006 musical Grey Gardens. He was also nominated for a Drama Desk Award in 1999 for his set design in the play That Championship Season.

He also designed the Delibes ballet SYLVIA for The San Francisco Ballet, and ROMEO AND JULIET: ON MOTIFS OF SHAKESPEARE (for the Mark Morris Dance Group) both choreographed by Mr. Morris.

In 2014, he was awarded Penn State's Arts and Architecture Alumni Award from the School of Theatre.
