= Lee Jellinek =

Lee Jellinek is a New York City based scenic designer known for his work on A Life at Playwrights Horizons.

== Career ==
Jellinek started his scenic design career in high school where designers came into his school and mentored him. He then obtained an internship with the Philadelphia Fringe Festival. He went to college for design began with scenic and costume design, and met his mentor Michael McGarty. He then went on to get his MFA at New York University Tisch School of the Arts's Design for Stage and Film.

He was touted by Live Design, a national magazine for theatrical and concert design and technology, as a Young Designer to Watch in 2010.

He opened his first show on Broadway in 2017 with Marvin's Room at the American Airlines Theatre with Roundabout Theatre Company.

== Awards and nominations ==
Year	Award	Show	Result
2020	Lucille Lortel Award for Outstanding Scenic Design	Mrs. Murray's Menagerie	Won
2019	Tony Award for Best Scenic Design in a Musical	Oklahoma!	Nominated
2019	Drama Desk Award for Outstanding Scenic Design of a Musical	Oklahoma!	Nominated
2019	Drama Desk Award for Outstanding Scenic Design of a Musical	Rags Parkland Sings the Songs of the Future	Nominated
2019	Henry Hewes Design Award for Outstanding Scenic Design	Rags Parkland Sings the Songs of the Future	Nominated
2019	Lucille Lortel Award for Outstanding Scenic Design	Rags Parkland Sings the Songs of the Future	Nominated
2018	Lucille Lortel Award for Outstanding Scenic Design	Mary Jane	Nominated
2017	Lucille Lortel Award for Outstanding Scenic Design	A Life	Won
2017	Henry Hewes Design Award for Outstanding Scenic Design	A Life	Won
2017	Drama Desk Awards for Outstanding Scenic Design	A Life	Nominated
2017	Henry Hewes Design Award for Outstanding Scenic Design	The Wolves	Nominated
2017	Henry Hewes Design Award for Outstanding Scenic Design	The Light Years	Nominated
2015	Lucille Lortel Award for Outstanding Scenic Design	The Nether	Nominated
2013	Obie Award for Sustained Excellence in Set Design	—N/a	Won
