= Santo Loquasto =

American production designer (born 1944)

- Born: July 26, 1944 (age 82); Wilkes-Barre, Pennsylvania, U.S.
- Education: King's College, Pennsylvania (BA); Yale University (MFA)
- Occupations: Production designer, scenic designer, costume designer
- Years active: 1969–present

Santo Richard Loquasto (born July 26, 1944) is an American production designer, scenic designer, and costume designer for stage, film, and dance.

== Early life and education ==
Loquasto was born in Wilkes-Barre, Pennsylvania, on July 26, 1944. Loquasto is a first cousin of Indy car driver Al Loquasto and a distant cousin of civil engineer and author Angelo F. Coniglio. The family is descended from Libertino lo Guasto, a foundling born in Serradifalco in 1796.

He obtained a Bachelor of Arts from King's College and a Master of Fine Arts from Yale University.

== Career ==
Loquasto started his career as a designer at the Showcase Theatre in Wilkes-Barre, Pennsylvania.

After working in regional theater since 1969, Loquasto worked on approximately 100 Broadway productions, either as scenic designer, costume designer, or both. His first Broadway production was Sticks and Bones in 1972, and his most recent productions have been Carousel and The Iceman Cometh, both in 2018. He has received 21 Tony Award nominations for his work as either costume or scenic designer, and has won four times. He has won the Drama Desk Award for Outstanding Set Design three times, and the Drama Desk Award for Outstanding Costume Design once.

Loquasto has been a production designer for many Woody Allen films, and was nominated for the Academy Award for his production design for Allen's Bullets over Broadway and Radio Days, and for costume design for Zelig.

His work has included the films Big, Radio Days, Cafe Society, Blue Jasmine, Desperately Seeking Susan, Alice, and Zelig. His work on stage is extensive and includes Hello, Dolly!, Movin' Out, Fosse, Ragtime, The Cherry Orchard, Grand Hotel, Cafe Crown, the ballet Don Quixote, Glengarry Glen Ross, and Fences.

Loquasto has won a British Academy Film Award, five Drama Desk Awards, and has garnered four Tony Awards. He has been nominated for three Academy Awards and a total of twenty-three Tony Awards. In 2004, Loquasto was inducted into the American Theater Hall of Fame.

In 2023, Loquasto was inducted into the Luzerne County Arts & Entertainment Hall of Fame. He was inducted as a member of the Hall of Fame's inaugural class.

== Tony Awards ==
Best Costume Design:

- 1977: The Cherry Orchard (tied with Theoni V. Aldredge for Annie)
- 1990: Grand Hotel: The Musical
- 2017: Hello, Dolly!

Best Scenic Design:

- 1989: Cafe Crown

== Selected theatre credits ==
- 1972 – Sticks & Bones
- 1972 – That Championship Season
- 1975 - Kennedy's Children
- 1978 – King of Hearts
- 1979 – Bent
- 1990 – Grand Hotel, The Musical
- 2005 – Glengarry Glen Ross
- 2007 – 110 in the Shade
- 2009 – Waiting For Godot
- 2016 – Shuffle Along
- 2017 – Hello, Dolly! (2017 revival)
- 2018 – Carousel (revival)
- 2018 – The Iceman Cometh (revival)
- 2019 – Gary: A Sequel to Titus Andonicus
