= Colts Drum and Bugle Corps =

Junior drum and bugle corps based in Dubuque, Iowa

Colts
- Location: Dubuque, Iowa
- Division: World Class
- Founded: 1963
- Director: Vicki MacFarlane
- Executive Director: Jeff MacFarlane
- Website: colts.org

The Colts Drum and Bugle Corps (previously known as the Junior Dukes, Legionnaires, and Colt .45) is a World Class competitive junior drum and bugle corps based in Dubuque, Iowa. The Colts are part of the Colts Youth Organization and a member of Drum Corps International, along with their feeder corps, the Colt Cadets, which participates in Open Class.

== History ==
The corps was founded in 1963 as the Junior Dukes, a junior corps to the Dukes of Dubuque, a senior corps. The Junior Dukes were sponsored by the local American Legion Post #6 and competed as a military style parade band. The corps performed for two years under that name before the Dukes of Dubuque disbanded in 1965. After the disbandment of the senior corps, the name was switched to the Legionnaires, and in 1966, the corps began to accept female members. By 1967, the corps was large enough to create a feeder corps known as the Cadets, and the Legionnaires began touring in regional VFW competitions.

In 1969, the corps changed their name again, then to the Colt .45 and Colt .45 Cadets. In 1971, the corps began to compete in VFW national competitions, earning as high as 5th place in 1973. That same year Colt .45 joined Drum Corps International, taking 28th in their first championship competition. Three years later, citing the negative association with both firearms and Colt 45 beer, the ".45" was dropped.

The Colts continue to compete as a member of Drum Corps International, earning their first finals spot in 1993. The Colts have been a consistent semifinalist every year since 1982, earning their highest finals placements in 1995, 2023, 2024 and 2026 at 9th place. Alongside the drum and bugle corps, the Colts Youth Organization also oversees the Colts Summer Band, Colts World Percussion, and a defunct competitive winter guard.

== Show summary (1973–2026) ==
Key
Pale green background indicates DCI World Class Semifinalist (Note: From 1973-1991, the Colts competed in Open Class, from 1992-2007 in Division I, and since 2008 in World Class. These are the same tier, just renamed.)
Pale blue background indicates DCI World Class Finalist

Year	Repertoire	World Championships	
Year	Repertoire	Score	Placement
1973	The Big Country by Jerome Moross / There's a Coach Coming In by Frederick Loewe & Alan Jay Lerner / Music from Cades County by Henry Mancini / How the West Was Won by Alfred Newman / When Johnny Comes Marching Home by Louis Lambert (Patrick Sarsfield Gilmore) / Battle Hymn of the Republic by William Steffe & Julia Ward Howe / United We Stand by Tony Hiller & Peter Simmons	62.800	28th Place; Open Class
1974	Fanfare for the Common Man & Billy the Kid by Aaron Copland / Oklahoma Crude by Henry Mancini / The Sting by Scott Joplin & Marvin Hamlisch / Ironsides / How the West Was Won by Alfred Newman	Did not attend World Championships	
1975	Wild, Wild West by Richard Markowitz / Ghost Riders in the Sky by Stan Jones / How the West Was Won by Alfred Newman / Scalphunters by Elmer Bernstein / Left Bank Express by Maynard Ferguson / Ironsides / "California Dreamin'" by John Phillips & Michelle Phillips	66.400	30th Place; Open Class
1976	Emperata Overture by Claude T. Smith / Just You and Me / Left Bank Express by Maynard Ferguson / Tower of Power Medley by Emilio Castillo & Stephen Kupka / Soul and Inspiration by Barry Mann & Cynthia Weil	71.250	25th Place; Open Class
1977	Gershwin's Three Piano Preludes by George Gershwin / Suncatchers by Butch Nordahl / Evergreen (from A Star Is Born) by Barbra Streisand & Paul Williams / Watch Closely Now & With One More Look at You by Paul Williams & Kenneth Ascher	73.100	26th Place; Open Class
1978	Showboat Scenario by Jerome Kern / The Birth of the Blues by Ray Henderson, Buddy G. DeSylva & Lew Brown / Take Five by Paul Desmond / A Star is Born by Paul Williams	68.650	27th Place; Open Class
1979	Starburst by Jeremy Wall / The Birth of the Blues by Ray Henderson, Buddy G. DeSylva & Lew Brown / Showboat by Jerome Kern / Star Gazer by Neil Diamond / Tara's Theme (from Gone with the Wind) by Max Steiner	63.300	35th Place; Open Class
1980	Everything's Coming Up Roses (from Gypsy) by Stephen Sondheim & Jule Styne / Summertime, It Ain't Necessarily So & There's a Boat Dat's Leavin' Soon for New York (from Porgy and Bess) by George Gershwin / Turkey in the Straw (Traditional) / Smile by Charlie Chaplin, John Turner & Geoffrey Parsons	61.100	28th Place; Open Class
1981	There's a Boat Dat's Leavin' Soon for New York & Summertime (from Porgy and Bess) by George Gershwin / Swanee by George Gershwin & Irving Caesar / Crosswinds by Billy Cobham / Come Sail Away by Dennis DeYoung	64.050	28th Place; Open Class
1982	Swing, Swing, Swing (from 1941) by John Williams / Summertime (from Porgy and Bess) by George Gershwin / Prelude/Angry Young Man by Billy Joel / Come in from the Rain by Melissa Manchester & Carole Bayer Sager	67.200	24th Place; Open Class
1983	Mississippi Suite by Ferde Grofe / Luck Be A Lady & Sit Down You're Rockin' the Boat (from Guys and Dolls) by Frank Loesser / Dill Pickles (Traditional) / Mr. Bojangles by Jerry Jeff Walker / Old Man River (from Show Boat) by Jerome Kern	60.600	22nd Place; Open Class; Semifinalist
1984	Stardust by Hoagy Carmichael & Mitchell Parish / Swing, Swing, Swing (from 1941) by John Williams / A Night in Tunisia by John Birks Gillespie / Peninsula by Oscar Castro-Neves & Sergio Mendes / What's New? by Bob Haggart & Johnny Burke / Come in from the Rain by Melissa Manchester & Carole Bayer Sager	70.400	23rd Place; Open Class; Semifinalist
1985	Stardust by Hoagy Carmichael & Mitchell Parish / Love for Sale (from The New Yorkers) by Cole Porter / A Night in Tunisia by John Birks Gillespie / Peninsula by Oscar Castro-Neves & Sergio Mendes / Skylark by Hoagy Carmichael & Johnny Mercer / Sing Sing Sing by Louie Prima	80.900	16th Place; Open Class; Semifinalist
1986	Johnny One Note (from Babes in Arms) by Richard Rodgers & Lorenz Hart / I Got Rhythm by George Gershwin & Ira Gershwin / Smile Again by Bill Champlin, David Foster, Jay Graydon & Alan Paul / The Heat's On by Sammy Nestico	74.700	20th Place; Open Class; Semifinalist
1987	Honeymoon Suite & Love for Sale (from The New Yorkers) by Cole Porter / Up the Ladder to the Roof by Frank Wilson & Vincent Dimirco / Mardi Gras March by Paul Webster & Sammy Fain / Somewhere Out There by James Horner, Barry Mann & Cynthia Weil / Fieval’s Reprise (from An American Tail: Fievel Goes West) by James Horner	76.500	20th Place; Open Class; Semifinalist
1988	Seems Like Old Times by Carmen Lombardo & John Jacob Loeb / Mountain Greenery (from The Garrick Gaieties) by Richard Rodgers & Lorenz Hart / Just in Time (from Bells Are Ringing) by Jule Styne, Betty Comden & Adolph Green / Mardi Gras March by Paul Webster & Sammy Fain / My Funny Valentine (from Babes in Arms) by Richard Rodgers & Lorenz Hart	78.500	18th Place; Open Class; Semifinalist
1989	Matchpoint by Jed Levy / Willowcrest by Bob Florence / Ballad for a Rough Year by Frank Mantooth	73.600	21st Place; Open Class
1990	Santorini by Yiannis Hrysomallis (Yanni) / Ludwig by Ludwig van Beethoven, adapted by Bob James / On a Hymnsong of Philip Bliss by David Holsinger / Farandole by Georges Bizet	72.800	23rd Place; Open Class
1991	Santorini by Yiannis Hrysomallis (Yanni) / On a Hymnsong of Philip Bliss by David Holsinger / Shock by John Tesh / Earthrise by Chip Davis / In the Spring, When Kings Go Off to War by David Holsinger	72.100	22nd Place; Open Class
1992	Morning to Morning by David Foster & David Paich / A Thousand Summers & Brain Dead Weasel by John Tesh / The Heart Is A Lonely Hunter by Dave Grusin & Peggy Lee / Reprise by Chuck Naffier	75.500	20th Place; Division I
1993	Iowa's Four Seasons; Winter by Chuck Naffier / A Thousand Summers by John Tesh / Summertime (from Porgy and Bess) by George Gershwin / The Heart Is A Lonely Hunter by Dave Grusin & Peggy Lee / Reprise by Chuck Naffier	81.600	12th Place; Division I Finalist
1994	Relations and Romance; Smile by Charlie Chaplin, John Turner & Geoffrey Parsons (pianist) / Almost Like Being in Love (from Brigadoon) by Frederick Loewe & Alan Jay Lerner / Lover Man by Jimmy Davis, Jimmy Sherman & Roger "Ram" Ramirez / Higher and Higher by Billy Davis, Raynard Miner, Gary Jackson & Carl Smith / As Time Goes By (from Casablanca) by Herman Hupfeld / Reprise 1994 by Chuck Naffier	80.100	12th Place; Division I Finalist
1995	Sunday in the Park with George; Sunday in the Park, Children and Art, Color and Light & Sunday; All from Sunday in the Park with George by Stephen Sondheim	86.300	9th Place; Division I Finalist
1996	The Magnificat; Magnificat anima me; Of a Rose, A Lovely Rose; Fecit Potentium; Esurientes & Gloria Patri; All from Magnificat by John Rutter	81.300	11th Place; Division I Finalist
1997	The Music of Blood, Sweat and Tears; Symphony for the Devil by Dick Halligan / God Bless the Child by Billie Holiday & Arthur Herzog Jr. / Lucretia McEvil by David Clayton-Thomas / Hi-De-Ho (That Ole Sweet Role) by Gerry Goffin & Carole King / 40,000 Headsmen by Steve Winwood & Jim Capaldi	84.100	13th Place; Division I Semifinalist
1998	A Cappella Celebration; Crown Him With Many Crowns by Charles H. Gabriel & Matthew Bridges / Searching for You by Wayne Shorter & Paul Stiller / Reza by Jaco Pastorius / Morning by Paul Stiller & Lisa Keily Stiller / Vox Finale by Chuck Naffier & Jerry Carpenter	85.300	12th Place; Division I Finalist
1999	Voices; Dies Irae (from Requiem) by Giuseppe Verdi / Flamma Flamma, Corpus Inimici & In Corpore (from Flamma Flamma – The Fire Requiem) by Nicholas Lens / I Believe by Eric Levi / Scherzo (from Fire Water Paper: A Vietnam Oratorio) by Elliot Goldenthal	86.000	12th Place; Division I Finalist
2000	The Wait of the World; Godspeed, Speech of Angels, The Wait of the World, Now the Children Lead & The Chosen; All by Stephen Melillo	82.300	14th Place; Division I Semifinalist
2001	Chivalry; Sinfonia Voci by David Holsinger / Allemande (from Courtly Airs and Dances) by Ron Nelson / Non Nobis Domine (from Henry V) by Patrick Doyle / Battle Scene by Michael Klesch / Once More Unto the Breach (from Henry V) by Patrick Doyle	84.900	12th Place; Division I Finalist
2002	Revelations; Dawn (from 5 Miniatures) by Joaquin Turina / Concerto for 4 Percussion, Be Thou My Vision & New Century Dawn by David Gillingham	83.900	15th Place; Division I Semifinalist
2003	Symphonic Visions: Ritual, Song, and Dance; Cantus Laetus by David Gillingham / Harrison's Dream by Peter Graham / Blue Sapphire (from Colours) by Roger Cichy	80.050	16th Place; Division I Semifinalist
2004	From the Heartland; American Overture by Joseph Willcox Jenkins / John Henry & Threshing Machines by Aaron Copland / Old Man River (from Show Boat) by Jerome Kern / Celebration by Robert Russell Bennett	81.325	16th Place; Division I Semifinalist
2005	Postcards From Home; The Promise of Living (from The Tender Land) & The Red Pony by Aaron Copland / The Landworkers (from Estancia) by Alberto Ginastera / Till There Was You (from The Music Man) by Meredith Willson / Stomp Your Foot by Aaron Copland / Jubilee by Morton Gould	84.075	13th Place; Division I Semifinalist
2006	Continuum; Windsprints by Richard Saucedo / As Time Goes By (from Casablanca) by Herman Hupfeld / Ride by Samuel Hazo	83.050	13th Place; Division I Semifinalist
2007	Equinox; With One Look (from Sunset Boulevard) by Andrew Lloyd Webber, Christopher Hampton & Don Black / Coronation of Boris Gudonov by Modest Moussorgsky / Troika (from Lieutenant Kijé Suite) by Sergei Prokofiev / String Quartet No. 4, Mvt. 5 "Allegro Molto" by Béla Bartók / As If We Never Said Goodbye (from Sunset Boulevard) by Andrew Lloyd Webber, Christopher Hampton & Don Black	86.150	10th Place; Division I Finalist
2008	Night and Day; Night and Day by Cole Porter / Bernstein Medley by Leonard Bernstein / Unexpected Song (from Song and Dance) by Andrew Lloyd Webber / Spellbound Concerto by Miklos Rosza	85.175	14th Place; World Class; Semifinalist
2009	Fathoms; Song of the High Seas (from Victory at Sea) by Richard Rodgers / The Sea Treaders (...In Calm And Storm) by W. Francis McBeth / The Voyage by Chris Tomsa & Max Mullinix / "Ebb Tide" by Robert Maxwell & Carl Sigman / SOS by Max Mullinix / The Journey Home by Chris Tomsa & Max Mullinix	85.600	13th Place; World Class; Semifinalist
2010	True Colors; Green by Michael Torke / Alone in the Crowd & One Man Show (from Pollock) by Jeff Beal / True Colors by Billy Steinberg & Tom Kelly / Appalachian Morning by Paul Halley	84.650	13th Place; World Class; Semifinalist
2011	Deception: The Jagged Edge; Swan Lake by Peter Ilyich Tchaikovsky / Danza de los Duendes by Nancy Galbraith / The Swan (from The Carnival of the Animals) by Camille Saint-Saëns / Mind Heist by Zack Hemsey	82.250	16th Place; World Class; Semifinalist
2012	Boundaries; August's Rhapsody (from August Rush) by Mark Mancina / Boundaries by David Nelson / Piano Concerto No. 2, Mvt. 2 by Sergei Rachmaninov / All By Myself by Eric Carmen	79.20	17th Place; World Class; Semifinalist
2013	Field of Dreams; Can't Help Falling In Love by Hugo Peretti, Luigi Creatore & George David Weiss / At Last by Mack Gordon & Harry Warren / American Graffiti by Aaron Guidry / The Place Where Dreams Come True (from Field of Dreams) by James Horner / Chorale & Fugue In Jazz by Morton Gould	82.450	15th Place; World Class; Semifinalist
2014	Dark Side of the Rainbow; Breathe by Roger Waters, David Gilmour & Richard Wright (Pink Floyd) / On the Run by David Gilmour & Roger Waters / Time by Nick Mason, Roger Waters, Richard Wright & David Gilmour / Powerhouse by Raymond Scott / The Great Gig in the Sky by Richard Wright & Clare Torry / Everything in Its Right Place by Thom Yorke, Jonny Greenwood, Colin Greenwood, Ed O'Brien & Philip Selway (Radiohead) / Brain Damage & Eclipse by Roger Waters	85.350	13th Place; World Class; Semifinalist
2015	...And a Shot Rings Out: A Johnny Staccato Murder Mystery; Man With The Golden Arm by Elmer Bernstein / Lex (from Metropolis Symphony) by Michael Daugherty / Audrey's Dance (from Twin Peaks) by Angelo Badalamenti / Science Fiction by Christian McBride / Moanin' by Charles Mingus / Lay Me Down by Sam Smith, James Napier & Elvin Smith / Scherzo (from Fire Water Paper: A Vietnam Oratorio) by Elliot Goldenthal / Original Music by Chuck Naffier & David Nelson	83.025	14th Place; World Class; Semifinalist
2016	Nachtmusik; Moonlight Sonata by Ludwig van Beethoven / Eine Kleine Nachtmusik by Wolfgang Amadeus Mozart / Vincent by Don McLean / Silent Night by Franz Xaver Gruber & Joseph Mohr / Nights in White Satin by Justin Hayward / New Moon In The Old Moon's Arms by Michael Kamen	81.513	16th Place; World Class; Semifinalist
2017	Both Sides Now; Prologue – Theme from We Are Marshall by Christophe Beck; Logic – Serenada Schizophrana by Danny Elfman & Kaleidoscope of Mathematics (from A Beautiful Mind) by James Horner; Emotion – Both Sides Now by Joni Mitchell; Conflict – Symphony No. 2 by John Barnes Chance; Resolution – Medley of We Are Marshall, Serenada Schizophrana & Both Sides Now	83.888	15th Place; World Class; Semifinalist
2018	True Believer; Loneliness – Motherless Child (Traditional) / Not to be Forgotten (Our Final Hour) by Pat Metheny; Whimsicality – L'arlesienne Suite No. 2: Farandole by Georges Bizet / Land of the Long White Cloud by Philip Sparke; Reflection – Endless Night (from The Lion King) by Hans Zimmer; Materialism – Big Shot by Billy Joel; Introspection – A Piece of Sky (from Yentl) by Michel Legrand & Alan and Marilyn Bergman	84.613	14th Place; World Class; Semifinalist
2019	When Hell Freezes Over; Hells Bells by Angus Young, Malcolm Young & Brian Johnson (AC/DC) / Inferno by Robert W. Smith / Danse Macabre by Camille Saint-Saens / Dulcinea (from Symphony No. 3, Don Quixote) by Robert W. Smith / Etude Op. 25 No. 11 (Winter Wind) by Frederic Chopin / Winter (from The Four Seasons) by Antonio Vivaldi / Knockin' on Heaven's Door by Bob Dylan	84.225	16th Place; World Class; Semifinalist
2020	Season canceled due to the COVID-19 pandemic		
2021	Leap of Faith; Rainbow Connection by Kenneth Ascher & Paul Williams / Take a Chance on Me by Benny Andersson & Björn Ulvaeus (ABBA) / Faith by Ryan Tedder, Benny Blanco & Francis Farewell Starlite / Faith by George Michael / Freedom 90 by George Michael	No scored competitions	
2022	The Silk Road; Meetings Along The Edge by Ravi Shankar & Philip Glass / Arabian Waltz by Rabih Abou-Khalil / The Dragon Boy by Joe Hisaishi / José / beFORe JOHN5 by Aurél Holló / Divas & Dunes by Aaron Zigman / Kashmir by John Bonham, Robert Plant & Jimmy Page (Led Zeppelin)	87.200	11th Place; World Class; Finalist
2023	Where the Heart Is; Home Sweet Home by Mötley Crüe / Minuano (Six-Eight) by Pat Metheny Group / To Build a Home by The Cinematic Orchestra & Patrick Watson / Feels Like Home by Randy Newman / Classical Gas by Mason Williams	90.263	9th Place; World Class; Finalist
2024	On Fields; Fields of Joy by Michael Kamen & Hal Fredricks / MacArthur Park by Jimmy Webb / Fields of Gold by Gordon Sumner / Autumn Leaves by Joseph Kosma, Jacques Prevert & Johnny Mercer / Original music by CJ Barrow, Josh Nelson & Michael Miller / The First Circle by Pat Metheny & Lyle Mays / Strawberry Fields Forever by Lennon-McCartney / Sowing the Seeds of Love by Roland Orzabal & Curt Smith	89.775	9th Place; World Class; Finalist
2025	In Restless Dreams; The Sound of Silence by Paul Simon / Assassin by Jack Stratton / 5 Peace Band by John McLaughlin / Sleep by Eric Whitacre / NO one To kNOW one by Andy Akiho	88.050	11th Place; World Class; Finalist
2026	American Experiment; Anthem by Michael J. Miller, Andrew Monteiro & Travis Peterman / Backlash by Simon Dobson / What Could Have Been by Sebastien Najand & Alexander Seaver / America the Beautiful by Samuel A. Ward / Every Living Breathing Moment by Grant Stellar	90.125	9th Place; World Class; Finalist

== Colt Cadets ==
The Colt Cadets Drum and Bugle Corps was founded in 1967 as the Legionnaires Cadets. In conjunction with the parent corps, it was renamed to the Colt .45 Cadets in 1969 before settling on the name Colt Cadets in 1976. The group serves as the feeder corps to the Colts Drum and Bugle Corps and is a member of the Drum Corps International Open Class division. A feeder corps is an Open Class group made up of younger members with the goal of training them to move up to the World Class group. The Colt Cadets have made Drum Corps International Open Class Finals by placing in the top twelve at Open Class Championships eight times from 2010 to 2023.

=== Show summary (1988–2026) ===
Key
Light blue background indicates DCI Open Class Finalist

Year	Repertoire	World Championships	
Year	Repertoire	Score	Placement
1988	Repertoire unavailable	37.500	24th Place; Class A60
1989	Repertoire unavailable	38.900	23rd Place; Class A60
1990–91	Repertoires unavailable	Did not attend World Championships	
1992	Repertoire unavailable	48.600	24th Place; Division III
1993–94	Repertoires unavailable	Did not attend World Championships	
1995	Simple Songs from Your Childhood; Simple Gifts by Joseph Brackett / I'm a Little Teapot by George Harold Sanders & Clarence Z. Kelly / A-Tisket, A-Tasket (Traditional) / Chopsticks by Euphemia Allen / Pentatonic Nightmare / Brahms' Lullaby by Johannes Brahms	Did not attend World Championships	
1996	Americana Celebration; Shall We Gather at the River by Aaron Copland / Yankee Doodle (Traditional) / Suite of Old American Songs by Aaron Copland	Did not attend World Championships	
1997	Willy Wonka and the Chocolate Factory; Golden Ticket, Oompa Loompa, Wondrous Boat Ride, I Want It Now, Pure Imagination & Candy Man; All from Willy Wonka & the Chocolate Factory by Leslie Bricusse & Anthony Newley	Did not attend World Championships	
1998	Bon Voyage (from Anything Goes) by Cole Porter / Day-O (The Banana Boat Song) (Traditional), adapted by Irving Burgie / Limbo Rock by David Appell / Island in the Sun by Harry Belafonte & Irving Burgie / Jamaica Farewell by Irving Burgie / Hot, Hot, Hot by Alphonsus Cassell	Did not attend World Championships	
1999	Hooked on the Weather Channel; Here Comes the Sun by George Harrison / Let The Sunshine In (from Hair) by Galt MacDermot / Let It Snow by Jule Styne & Sammy Cahn / Raindrops Keep Falling on My Head by Burt Bacharach & Hal David / Singin' in the Rain (from Singin' in the Rain) by Nacio Herb Brown & Arthur Freed / Stormy Weather Medley by Harold Arlen & Ted Koehler / Blue Skies (from Alexander's Ragtime Band) by Irving Berlin / You Are My Sunshine by Jimmie Davis & Charles Mitchell	Did not attend World Championships	
2000	A Sailor's Life For Me / Tame The Savage Sea by Elliot del Borgo / The Pirate's Tale / Russian Sailor's Dance (from The Red Poppy) by Reinhold Glière / Anchors Away by Alfred H. Miles & Charles A. Zimmermann	Did not attend World Championships	
2001	Trapped in the Time Machine; 2001: A Space Odyssey by Richard Strauss / Loco-Motion by Gerry Goffin & Carole King / Daisy Bell (Bicycle Built For Two) by Harry Dacre / Pedestrian's Folly / Cruisin' by Smokey Robinson / Magic Carpet Ride by John Kay & Rushton Moreve	Did not attend World Championships	
2002	Make His Praise Glorious by Bill and Robin Wolaver / A Mighty Fortress by Martin Luther / I'll Give You Peace by Dawn Yarbrough Thomas and Tom Yarborough / Away In The Darkness by Scott Stulir / Amen by Bob Kauflin / Reprise by Ted Reicher	Did not attend World Championships	
2003	OzFest; Over The Rainbow (from The Wizard Of Oz) by Harold Arlen & E.Y. Harburg / I'm A Mean Ole Lion, Slide Some Oil To Me, Ease On Down the Road & If You Believe (all from The Wiz) by Charlie Smalls	Did not attend World Championships	
2004	Snoop Dog; Linus And Lucy (from A Charlie Brown Christmas) by Vince Guaraldi / Snoopy's Song & Dime A Dozen (from Snoopy! The Musical) by Larry Grossman & Hal Hackad / "Snoopy vs. the Red Baron" by Phil Gernhard & Dick Holler / The World According To Snoopy & It's The Reprise, Charlie Brown (from Snoopy, The Musical) by Larry Grossman & Hal Hackad)	Did not attend World Championships	
2005	Arcade! Insert Coin / The Puzzle / The Chase / The Triumph	Did not attend World Championships	
2006	Criminal Mischief; Dragnet by Scott Nathan / Secret Agent Man by P.F. Sloan & Steve Barri / James Bond Theme by Monty Norman / Call Me, Beep Me! (The Kim Possible Theme Song) by Cory Lerious & George Gabriel / Carmen Sandiego by Sean Altman & David Yazbek / Charlie's Angels Theme by Jack Elliot & Allyn Ferguson / Live And Let Die by Linda McCartney & Paul McCartney	66.375	11th Place; Division II
2007	Sold Out! Carry On My Wayward Son by Kerry Livgren / Point Of Know Return by Steve Walsh, Robby Steinhardt & Phil Ehart / Lights by Dennis DeYoung & Tommy Shaw / Synchronicity I by Sting / All The Small Things by Blink-182 / Ants Marching by Dave Matthews	Did not attend World Championships	
2008	New American Signatures; America & American Tune by Paul Simon / Song For America by Kerry Livgren	76.125	18th Place; Open Class
2009	Lullaby & Good Nightmare; Theme (from Big Top Pee-wee) by Danny Elfman / The Place Where Dreams Come True (from Field of Dreams) by James Horner / Hall Of The Mountain King (from Peer Gynt Suite No. 1) by Edvard Grieg	78.100	14th Place; Open Class
2010	Sorcerer's Revenge; Music of Andrew Boysen, Jr. by Andrew Boysen, Jr. / The Sorcerer's Apprentice by Paul Dukas / Night on Bald Mountain by Modest Mussorgsky / For Good (from Wicked) by Stephen Schwartz	82.300	11th Place; Open Class; Finalist
2011	NOTORIOUS; Overture (from Anne of the Indies) by Franz Waxman / Overture (from Mutiny on the Bounty) by Bronisław Kaper / Billy the Kid by Aaron Copland / Finale & The Immigrant (from The Godfather) by Nino Rota / Symphony No. 5 in D minor, Op. 47, Mvt. 4 Allegro non troppo by Dmitri Shostakovich	79.150	12th Place; Open Class; Finalist
2011	NOTORIOUS; Overture (from Anne of the Indies) by Franz Waxman / Overture (from Mutiny on the Bounty) by Bronisław Kaper / Billy the Kid by Aaron Copland / Finale & The Immigrant (from The Godfather) by Nino Rota / Symphony No. 5 in D minor, Op. 47, Mvt. 4 Allegro non troppo by Dmitri Shostakovich	54.300	37th Place; World Class
2012	Alive; Escape From Chronopolis by Reber Clark / Theme from Van Helsing by Alan Silvestri / Piano Sonata No. 8, Op. 13 by Ludwig van Beethoven / Theme from Psycho by Bernard Herrmann / Facade (from Jekyll & Hyde) by Frank Wildhorn & Leslie Bricusse	75.400	12th Place; Open Class; Finalist
2012	Alive; Escape From Chronopolis by Reber Clark / Theme from Van Helsing by Alan Silvestri / Piano Sonata No. 8, Op. 13 by Ludwig van Beethoven / Theme from Psycho by Bernard Herrmann / Facade (from Jekyll & Hyde) by Frank Wildhorn & Leslie Bricusse	57.950	33rd Place; World Class
2013	Red; Habanera (from Carmen) by Georges Bizet / The Heart is a Lonely Hunter by Dave Grusin & Peggy Lee / Happy Ending (from The Red Pony Suite) by Aaron Copland / Red In The Air by Terry White & Brian Zeglis	80.900	10th Place; Open Class; Finalist
2013	Red; Habanera (from Carmen) by Georges Bizet / The Heart is a Lonely Hunter by Dave Grusin & Peggy Lee / Happy Ending (from The Red Pony Suite) by Aaron Copland / Red In The Air by Terry White & Brian Zeglis	63.100	32nd Place; World Class
2014	Crazed; Overture (from Dancer in the Dark) by Björk / Equus by Eric Whitacre / Crazy by Brian Burton & Thomas Calloway / Goin' Out Of My Mind by Teddy Randazzo & Bobby Weinstein / Love Crazed by Terry White	66.000	10th Place; Open Class; Finalist
2014	Crazed; Overture (from Dancer in the Dark) by Björk / Equus by Eric Whitacre / Crazy by Brian Burton & Thomas Calloway / Goin' Out Of My Mind by Teddy Randazzo & Bobby Weinstein / Love Crazed by Terry White	63.150	32nd Place; World Class
2015	Fire & Ice; The Inferno (from The Divine Comedy) by Robert W. Smith / The Firebird Suite by Igor Stravinsky / Cuban Fire! by Johnny Richards / Ice Dance by Danny Elfman / Russian Christmas Music by Alfred Reed	64.100	10th Place; Open Class; Finalist
2015	Fire & Ice; The Inferno (from The Divine Comedy) by Robert W. Smith / The Firebird Suite by Igor Stravinsky / Cuban Fire! by Johnny Richards / Ice Dance by Danny Elfman / Russian Christmas Music by Alfred Reed	57.150	35th Place; World Class
2016	The Journey Within; Joy by Joseph Curiale / Symphony No. 9 in D minor by Anton Bruckner / Smile (from Modern Times) by Charlie Chaplin / Ode to Joy from Symphony No. 9 by Ludwig van Beethoven	61.550	15th Place; Open Class
2016	The Journey Within; Joy by Joseph Curiale / Symphony No. 9 in D minor by Anton Bruckner / Smile (from Modern Times) by Charlie Chaplin / Ode to Joy from Symphony No. 9 by Ludwig van Beethoven	57.650	37th Place; World Class
2017	The River's Edge; Earth Dance by Michael Sweeney / Flight Of The Piasa by Robert Sheldon / Quad City Stomp by Michael Sweeney / Vitava (Die Moldau) by Bedřich Smetana	61.200	14th Place; Open Class
2017	The River's Edge; Earth Dance by Michael Sweeney / Flight Of The Piasa by Robert Sheldon / Quad City Stomp by Michael Sweeney / Vitava (Die Moldau) by Bedřich Smetana	60.925	38th Place; World Class
2018	Moderne; Un Bel Di by Giacomo Puccini / Symphony No. 7, Mvt. 2 by Ludwig van Beethoven / Young And Beautiful by Lana Del Rey & Rick Nowels / Bad Romance by Stefani Germanotta (Lady Gaga) & Nadir Khayat / The Hut Of Baba Yaga & The Great Gate of Kiev (from Pictures at an Exhibition) by Modest Mussorgsky	62.800	13th Place; Open Class
2018	Moderne; Un Bel Di by Giacomo Puccini / Symphony No. 7, Mvt. 2 by Ludwig van Beethoven / Young And Beautiful by Lana Del Rey & Rick Nowels / Bad Romance by Stefani Germanotta (Lady Gaga) & Nadir Khayat / The Hut Of Baba Yaga & The Great Gate of Kiev (from Pictures at an Exhibition) by Modest Mussorgsky	61.800	38th Place; World Class
2019	...Of a Feather; Blackbird by John Lennon & Paul McCartney / Don't Stop Me Now by Freddie Mercury / On Eagles Wings by Michael Joncas / The Raven by Alan Parsons & Eric Woolfson	65.600	11th Place; Open Class; Finalist
2019	...Of a Feather; Blackbird by John Lennon & Paul McCartney / Don't Stop Me Now by Freddie Mercury / On Eagles Wings by Michael Joncas / The Raven by Alan Parsons & Eric Woolfson	64.425	33rd Place; World Class
2020	Season canceled due to the COVID-19 pandemic		
2021	Apart Together; Once Upon Another Time by Sara Bareilles / Afro American Symphony No. 4 by William Grant Still / Pray For Me by Kendrick Lamar & The Weeknd / At Last by Ella Fitzgerald	No scored competitions	
2022	To The Stars; Rewrite The Stars by Benj Pasek & Justin Paul / Rocket Man by Elton John / Enterprising Young Men (from Star Trek) by Michael Giacchino	67.150	14th Place; Open Class
2022	To The Stars; Rewrite The Stars by Benj Pasek & Justin Paul / Rocket Man by Elton John / Enterprising Young Men (from Star Trek) by Michael Giacchino	65.225	35th Place; World Class
2023	Classical Innovations; Moonlight Sonata by Ludwig van Beethoven / Golden Hour by JVKE / Until The Scars by John Mackey	70.025	9th Place; Open Class; Finalist
2023	Classical Innovations; Moonlight Sonata by Ludwig van Beethoven / Golden Hour by JVKE / Until The Scars by John Mackey	68.550	30th Place; World Class
2024	The Woods; Peter and the Wolf by Sergei Prokofiev / Ballad from Into the Woods by Stephen Sondheim / The Path Between Mountains by Jay Kennedy	72.050	8th Place; Open Class; Finalist
2024	The Woods; Peter and the Wolf by Sergei Prokofiev / Ballad from Into the Woods by Stephen Sondheim / The Path Between Mountains by Jay Kennedy	70.500	29th Place; World Class
2025	The Hive; The Wasps by Ralph Vaughan Williams / Run the World (Girls) by Beyonce / Honeybee by Steam Powered Giraffes / Foundry by John Mackey / Flight of the Bumblebee by Nikolai Rimsky-Korsakov	71.050	8th Place; Open Class; Finalist
2025	The Hive; The Wasps by Ralph Vaughan Williams / Run the World (Girls) by Beyonce / Honeybee by Steam Powered Giraffes / Foundry by John Mackey / Flight of the Bumblebee by Nikolai Rimsky-Korsakov	70.550	29th Place; World Class
2026	GO! Pedal to the Medal by Terry White & Tim Berg / Fuel by Metallica / Fast Car by Tracy Chapman / The Last Race by Hans Zimmer	73.225	7th Place; Open Class; Finalist
2026	GO! Pedal to the Medal by Terry White & Tim Berg / Fuel by Metallica / Fast Car by Tracy Chapman / The Last Race by Hans Zimmer	73.350	27th Place; World Class
