= Lubovitch =

Lubovitch or Lubavitch may refer to:

- Lar Lubovitch, American choreographer
- Chabad Lubavitch, branch of Hasidic Judaism
- Lar Lubovitch Dance Company, dance company founded by Lar Lubovitch
