= Pastime Variations =

1988 orchestral work by Elliot Goldenthal

Pastime Variations is a 1988 orchestral work by Elliot Goldenthal commemorating the 75th anniversary of Ebbets Field, former home of the Brooklyn Dodgers baseball team. It was performed by the Haydn-Mozart Chamber Orchestra at the Brooklyn Academy of Music.
