= Antoine Silverman =

American musician

Antoine Silverman is a New York violinist, music contractor, and music arranger. The son of folk guitarist, writer and singer Jerry Silverman, Antoine began classical violin lessons at the age of three. By 5, he had discovered bluegrass as well, accompanying his father and playing fiddle contests throughout the eastern United States. By age 14 he began playing jazz. He currently performs, records and writes bluegrass, jazz, country, and classical regularly. He was the concertmaster, music contractor and Music Coordinator for the musical Spider-Man: Turn Off the Dark, which ran on Broadway in from 2011 to 2014.

Antoine has recorded and performed with Garth Brooks, Moby, Steve Tyrell, Rod Stewart, Peter Murphy, Ben Folds, Dixie Chicks, Sheryl Crow, Lou Reed, Fall Out Boy, Dashboard Confessional, Lenny Kravitz, Sharon Jones, Rufus Wainwright, Michael Jackson, Harry Connick Jr. and others. He soloed with the Boston Pops in 2009. Silverman is also the violinist in Kelli O'Hara's band.

He has 2 solo records: Swing Shift, recorded in 1998, and Blue Moods, in 2001. He also has written 2 educational books, Step One: Play Violin, and Fiddle Tunes, Basic and Beyond; the latter was released by Warner Brothers.

In 2012, Silverman portrayed the symbolic role of Einstein in the revival of the Philip Glass/Robert Wilson freeform opera Einstein on the Beach; during the production's world tour, Silverman alternated with Jennifer Koh in the role, and was seen primarily in non-North American performances of the opera.

== Personal life ==
Silverman grew up in Hastings on Hudson in New York during the school year, and spent his summers in Noirmoutier-en-l'Île. He is the middle of 3 sons born to school teacher Tatiana and folk musician Jerry Silverman. He graduated from Horace Mann School in 1989 and also attended Juilliard School and Columbia University in the joint program, graduating from Columbia with a Bachelor of Arts. Silverman studied violin with Albert Markov, Sally Thomas and Victor Danchenko.

Silverman lives in New York City with his two children.

== See also ==
- (1999) The Green Bird (Elliot Goldenthal musical in which he performed.)
- (2001) Shrek the Musical (concertmaster)
- (2003) Urban Cowboy (Fiddle)
- (2003) the Raven (Violin)
- (2004) Dirty Rotten Scoundrels (Concertmaster)

With Nels Cline

- Lovers (Blue Note, 2016)
