= Sidney Goldfarb =

American poet (1942–2023)

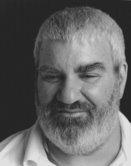
Sidney Goldfarb

Sidney Goldfarb (born November 23, 1942, in Peabody, Massachusetts, died March 29, 2023, in Colorado) was a Harvard College- educated American poet and experimental playwright, whose work continues the tradition of poetic theater. Goldfarb co-founded the acclaimed Creative Writing Program at the University of Colorado at Boulder in 1975, serving as its first director. He was the recipient of numerous grants and fellowships, including a Rockefeller Foundation Fellowship (1968), a National Endowment for the Arts grant (1970), a Goethe Foundation Grant (1984), and multiple grants from the New York State Council on the Arts.

== Books ==
- Speech, for Instance (poetry), Farrar, Straus and Giroux, 1969
- Messages (poetry), Farrar, Straus and Giroux, 1971
- Curve in the Road (poetry), Halty-Ferguson, 1980
- The Rushes of Tulsa and Other Plays (poetic theater), Barrytown-Station Hill, 2008

== Plays ==
(Dates indicate first production)

- Pedro Páramo (adapted from the novel by Juan Rulfo), 1979
- Huerfano, 1980
- Tristan: A Retelling, 1983
- Hot Lunch Apostles, 1983
- The Transposed Heads (adapted with Julie Taymor from the novel by Thomas Mann, with music by Elliot Goldenthal), 1984
- Big Mouth, 1985
- Orange Grove, 1988
- Music Rescue Service, 1991
- The Rushes of Tulsa, 1999
- Bad Women, 2000
