= The Green Bird =

1765 Italian commedia dell'arte play

- The cover of Goldenthal's score for the 2000 Broadway production
- Original language: Italian
- Written by: Carlo Gozzi
- Characters: Tartaglia; Ninetta; Barbarina; Renzo; Tartagliona; Brighella; The Green Bird many others
- Subject: A fantastic, but dysfunctional, royal family
- Genre: Commedia dell'arte, Fantasy, Dark Comedy
- Setting: Monterotondo

Premiere
- Date: 18th Century

The Green Bird (Italian: L'augellino belverde) is a 1765 commedia dell'arte play by Carlo Gozzi. It is a sequel to The Love of Three Oranges. The main plot of The Green Bird has several similarities with the widespread tale The Dancing Water, the Singing Apple, and the Speaking Bird.

== Plot ==
The play is set in the imaginary city of Monterotondo.

Pantalone remembers how 18 years ago, King Tartaglia left for the wars, leaving his wicked mother, Tartagliona, in control of the government. Tartagliona buried alive her daughter-in-law, Queen Ninetta, and ordered Pantalone to kill her twin children, Barbarina and Renzo. Pantalone instead wrapped them tightly in oilcloth and threw them in the river, tricking Tartagliona by showing her the hearts of two young goats. Pantalone still doubts that the twins could have survived. Yet Pantalone now hears Brighella the soothsayer utter a prophecy which predicts that the King, the Queen, and the twins will return, along with other fantastical events. Pantalone is sceptical.

Truffaldino is a grumpy butcher. He talks with his wife Smeraldina about how, 18 years ago, they rescued twins named Barbarina and Renzo and raised them as their own. He then informs the twins, to their horror, that they are bastards and that they must leave as he can no longer afford to feed them. Renzo has been reading philosophy books and informs the doubtful Barberina that humans are motivated purely by selfishness; they must avoid all pleasure and be sceptical of all friendship that they encounter. Barberina wonders if this includes the friendly green bird that often flutters around her.

In the drains below the palace, Queen Ninetta has been trapped for 18 years. Her only friend is the green bird, who brings her food. To her astonishment, the green bird suddenly speaks. He explains that he is a king transformed by an ogre, that Tartagliona fooled King Tartaglia into agreeing to Ninetta's imprisonment, that her children are alive, and that if they discover their true parentage, Tartagliona will be overthrown and the green bird will return to human form and, he hopes, marry Barberina.

On a beach, the freezing, hungry Barberina is increasingly sceptical of Renzo's self-denying philosophy. Suddenly Calmon, King of the Statues, appears and tells Renzo that his philosophy is too extreme. He tells them they must find their true parents, that the green bird is key to the mystery, that if they need help they should call on him, and that if they throw a pebble at the palace they will become rich.

King Tartaglia returns from the wars, depressed because he misses Ninetta. Truffaldino, his former cook, is friendly to him, but admits that he's only doing so because he needs money, at which the King rejects him, feeling entirely unloved. Tartagliona tries to cheer him up, but he sends her away. She then encounters Brighella, who flatters her, although his prophecies are ominous.

Outside the palace, Barberina throw the pebble but vows that if riches do come, they'll not be spoiled by them but will humbly remember they came from a mere pebble. Out of the pebble a mansions grows, with servants, and their clothes become rich. Barberina remains sceptical that happiness will come of this. She is right, as she and Renzo are soon corrupted by snobbery; Barberina even talks down to her foster mother, Smeraldina, whom she hires as a servant, and Renzo hires his foster father, Truffaldino, as a clown.

Barberina goes out onto the mansion's balcony, where she is seen by the King from the balcony of his own palace next door. The two are attracted to each other and flirt from their respective balconies. Then Tartagliona, following the advice of Brighella, fills Barberina with the desire for the ultimate in unattainable possessions: the legendary singing apple and dancing waters.

Renzo, meanwhile, has fallen in love with a statue in the garden and has found a mysterious dagger. Barberina begs him to go on the quest for the singing apple and dancing waters; he wonders if they could help bring the statue to life. He sets off with Truffaldino, leaving the dagger with Barberina: if he dies, its blade will appear bloodstained. Meanwhile, the green bird updates Ninetta in her prison, fearing that incest is imminent.

Renzo finds the singing apple and dancing waters guarded by the fairy Serpentina, who sends a lion, a tiger, and skeletons to frighten them away. Renzo calls on Calmon. Calmon summons the Fountain Statue of Treviso to distract the lion and tiger with water, enabling Renzo to pick the apple, and he summons the statues from the Campo dei Mori in Venice to push open the gate to enable Truffaldino to gather the dancing waters in bottles. But, Calmon is disgusted that the twins have fallen into vanity and pride and advises them to turn to more spiritual things. He offers to help again in the future, but in return he requests help with fixing his chipped nose, and the other statues demand repair work on their various chips and erosion.

Back in the mansion, Renzo dresses the statue he loves, Pompea, in clothes and she now speaks; but she warns him against lust and vice, and requests to be left alone. Truffaldino then updates Renzo on events in the palace: the King wanted to marry Barberina, but she couldn't decide whether she loved him or the green bird; when Tartagliona, on Brighella's advice, demanded the green bird for herself, Barberina realized she wanted the bird more than anything and plunged into madness. To cure her, Renzo must find the green bird, who is held by an ogre on a mountain. Renzo leaves on this quest, but Pompea makes Barberina feel guilty for the dangers her vanity is putting him in; Barberina follows Renzo to stop him.

At the ogre's mountain, Renzo finds the green bird chained and surrounded by statues. He cannot call on Calmon because he never bothered to help fix his nose. When he and Truffaldino try to unchain the bird, they are turned into statues. Barberina and Smeraldina arrive and notice that the magic dagger now looks bloodstained. Barberina realizes that her greed was wrong. But Calmon appears, praises her recognition of her error, and advises her to rescue the bird by reading words from a scroll while standing on a precise spot. She successfully does so, and the bird vows to be her husband, and with its feather she releases the statues, including Renzo and Truffaldino.

Back in the garden of the palace, Renzo and Pompea are happy at last she's released. King Tartaglia is desperate to marry Barbarina, but the green bird reveals the true parentage of the twins, and that Queen Ninetta is imprisoned below the palace. As punishment, Tartagliona and Brighella are turned into a turtle and a donkey. And then the green bird turns back into his true form, the King of Terradombra, and marries Barberina. The play ends with Barberina suggesting that they ought to repair Calmon's nose.

== Themes ==
Gozzi wrote that under the surface of this silly play was a critique of what he considered to be the dangerous ideas of Enlightenment philosophy as propounded by thinkers such as Helvetius, Rousseau and Voltaire. The characters are embodiments of self-love in its various forms. According to Gozzi, the philosophical ideas in the play became a topic of discussion in Venice, so that even the most austere monks would attend productions in disguise. Despite its serious ideas, Gozzi tried to make the play appealing to ordinary people.

== Production history ==
The Green Bird was first performed at the Sant'Angelo Theatre in Venice, opening on 19 January 1765. It played 19 times to full houses and the company continued to perform it every year for a long time afterward. In the original productions, the statues in the play were imitations of real statues to be found in neighbourhoods of Venice; Gozzi did this so that people would think they recognized the statues and would attend multiple times in order to confirm it.

The play has been translated into English by Albert Bermel and Ted Emery and also by John D. Mitchell.

The most famous English-language production, directed by Julie Taymor, was originally presented in March 1996 at The New Victory Theater on 42nd Street with Theater for a New Audience. Taymor designed the masks and puppets. It was subsequently produced at La Jolla Playhouse when Michael Grief was the artistic director. The Broadway production opened on April 18, 2000, and closed on June 4 after 56 regular performances and 15 previews. The production won glowing reviews for its strong performances and breathtaking creative aspects. It received Tony Award nominations for Best Costume Design and Best Featured Actor for Derek Smith as Tartaglia. Elliot Goldenthal composed a highly acclaimed score for the production that is available on iTunes. Musical staging was by Daniel Ezralow.

In 1994, as a commission for the Batignano Festival, British composer Jonathan Dove used Gozzi's tale as the basis for his opera The Little Green Swallow or L'augellino belverde, set 18 years after The Love of Three Oranges. Dove used Gozzi's original words, setting them to music in an English translation by Adam Pollock. Dove's The Little Green Swallow was performed by at the Guildhall School of Music and Drama in London in June 2005, and by British Youth Opera on 8, 11 and 13 September 2014 at the Peacock Theatre, Portugal Street, London.

In April 2016, the Fountain School of Performing Arts at Dalhousie University put on a successful production set in 1950s Cuba.

== Awards and nominations ==
=== Original Broadway production ===
Year	Award	Category	Nominee	Result
2000	Tony Award	Best Featured Actor in a Play	Derek Smith	Nominated
2000	Tony Award	Best Costume Design	Constance Hoffman	Nominated
