= The Green Bird (soundtrack) =

Soundtrack album by Elliot Goldenthal
- Released: August 22, 2000
- Genre: Classical, Avant-garde
- Length: 35'51
- Label: DRG
- Producer: Elliot Goldenthal.

Elliot Goldenthal chronology
Othello (1998)	The Green Bird (1999)	Grendel (2006)

Professional ratings
Review scores
Source	Rating
MovieMusicUK	link
Soundtrack-Express	link
RationalMagic	(Favourable)
CurtainUp.com	(Very favourable)

The Green Bird score is composed and orchestrated by Elliot Goldenthal for the 1999 musical of the same name, directed by long-time Goldenthal collaborator Julie Taymor, It is an allegorical fairy tale of a royal family's rite of passage after being separated by a wicked grandmother.

The score itself is typical of Goldenthal's style; atonal, sometimes dissonant and a balance between theatre, drama and invention. It was, along with the musical itself, well-received by critics.

== Track listing ==
1. Truffaldino's Sausage Shop (1:15)
2. O Greedy People (2:56)
3. Tartaglia's Lament (1:52)
4. The Bickering (1:02)
5. Calmon, King of Statues (2:28)
6. Joy to the King (2:14)
7. Ninetta's Hope (2:33)
8. Renzo and Pompea Duet (2:11)
9. Barbarina's Lament (1:48)
10. The Waters That Dance (1:26)
11. Serpentina's Garden (1:33)
12. Under Bustle Funk (1:13)
13. Green Bird Descent (2:12)
14. The Magic Feather (1:06)
15. The King's Lament (solo violin) (0:40)
16. Accordions and Palace Rhumba (1:28)
17. Prologue (Radio Waves) (2:00)
18. Acids and Alkalis (2:28)
19. Apple Aria Instrumental (1:35)
20. O Foolish Heart (2:19)

== Cast and crew ==
- Voice cast: Sophia Salguero, Sarah Jane Nelson, Meredith Patterson, Sebastian Roché, Lee Lewis, Andrew Weems, Ken Barnett, Reg E. Cathey, Didi Conn, Ned Eisenberg, Edward Hibbert, Katie MacNicol, Sarah Jane Nelson, Kristine Nielsen, Derek Smith, Ramon Flowers and Bruce Turk.
- Musical soloists: Barry Finclair, Teese Gohl, Bruce Williamson, Harvey Estrin, Steve Gorn, Gerard Reuter, Antoine Silverman, Bill Ruyle, Gil Goldstein, Virgil Blackwell, Elliot Goldenthal and Richard Martinez.
