= Zeke's Pad =

Canadian-Australian animated television series

- Created by: Liz Scully
- Voices of: Michael Adamthwaite; Tim Hamaguchi; Chiara Zanni; Tabitha St. Germain; Trevor Devall
- Composer: Steve London
- Countries of origin: Canada; Australia
- Original language: English
- No. of series: 1
- No. of episodes: 26

Production
- Executive producers: Delna Bhesania; Kelly Bray; Michael Hefferon; Liz Scully; Avrill Stark; Leonard Terhoch; Barry Ward
- Producers: Delna Bhesania; Liz Scully; Avrill Stark; Leonard Terhoch
- Running time: 22 minutes
- Production companies: Leaping Lizard Productions; Bardel Entertainment; Avrill Stark Entertainment; Flying Bark Productions (uncredited)

Original release
- Network: YTV (Canada); Seven Network (Australia)
- Release: 26 December 2008 – 9 January 2010

Zeke's Pad is an animated television series about the adventures of a 14-year-old skateboarder and artist named Zeke who owns a magic electronic pad that brings anything he draws to life. The show was co-produced by Bardel Entertainment, Flying Bark Productions, Star Farm Productions, and Leaping Lizard Productions in association with Seven Network Australia and YTV Canada Inc. It aired on YTV in Canada on Saturdays at 7 PM.

== Synopsis ==
Zeke Palmer is 14 years old. He enjoys skateboarding and creating art. He owns a "pad" that functions as a phone, PDA, GPS device, MP3 player, and a graphics tablet. Anything he draws on the pad becomes animate, and Zeke is shown that actions have consequences.

== Characters ==
- Ezekiel "Zeke" Palmer (voiced by Michael Adamthwaite): A creative 14-year-old artist and skateboarder. He is a risk taker and often acts without thinking.
- Jayden "Jay" Fritter (voiced by Tim Hamaguchi): Zeke's best friend. Jay is the only person who knows about the ability of Zeke's pad.
- Rachel Palmer (voiced by Chiara Zanni): Zeke's younger sister and a theatre performer.
- Issac "Ike" Palmer (voiced by Trevor Devall): Zeke's older brother and an athlete.
- Ida Palmer (voiced by Tabitha St. Germain): Zeke's mother who is very strict about organization and order in the house.
- Alvin Palmer (voiced by Trevor Devall): Zeke's father, a concert musician.
- Maxine Marx (voiced by Tabitha St. Germain): Zeke's secret crush.

== Episodes ==
No.	Title	Directed by	Written by	Original release date	Prod. code
1	"You Art What You Eat"	Ian Freedman	Liz Scully	26 December 2008	101
Zeke draws up a room full of pancakes. He eats so much that he becomes bloated and sick. The next day at school, he fails a fitness test and he is sent to a fitness camp to get him in shape and lose his belly. Unfortunately, his Pad is confiscated before he can draw his way out of the torturous camp. He has to call his best friend Jay to help him get his Pad back and escape.
2	"The Big Picture"	Florian Wagner	Liz Scully	2 January 2009	102
After he loses control of the TV remote at home and misses his favorite reality show, Zeke draws himself a giant TV, but the whole neighborhood now wants the remote to his TV. Feeling like he doesn't matter anymore, Zeke draws himself as the star of his reality show. Soon, his ego gets the best of him, and he begins to direct his family on how to portray themselves, eventually replacing them with better actors. This causes his family to stop talking to him, and Zeke must somehow repair the damage his ego has done.
3	"Fast Draw"	Ian Freedman	Liz Scully	9 January 2009	103
Zeke draws a robot version of himself to do his chores for him. He then adds some personality to his robot to make it cool (i.e. make it more like him). It comes to the point that it asks Zeke's secret crush, Maxine, out for a date. Zeke becomes jealous and tries to make his robot stop, but it goes on a rampage and frames Zeke for it, causing Zeke to be stuck in detention. With Jay's help, Zeke escapes and lures the robot into a back alley for a classic western style showdown, only to discover, much to his surprise, that the robot also has a magic Pad.
4	"The Art of Cool"	Florian Wagner	Liz Scully	16 January 2009	104
Tired of his father Alvin embarrassing him in front of his friends, Zeke draws his father to be "cooler", which turns him into a Bono-esque rock star; only for Alvin to declare Zeke no longer cool enough to be around and starts trying to reshape Zeke into his image. Alvin also helps Zeke with his role in the family band. When he finds out that the first performance will be at his very own high school dance, Zeke freaks out and worries that he is not cool enough.
5	"Drawn Together"	Ian Freedman	Myra Fried	23 January 2009	105
Zeke and Jay are starting to get on each others nerves, so they agree to spend some time apart. To ensure they do not come close together, Zeke draws them as opposite charges, not realizing that this only makes them stuck to each other no matter where they go. To make matters worse, Zeke has a skateboarding date with Maxine, and with Jay stuck to him, Zeke has a hard time impressing Maxine. In a moment of frustration, Zeke draws Jay far, far away. Soon, Zeke starts to miss his Jay, unaware that he is only at the local grocery store.
6	"Fetch a Sketch"	Tim Golsby-Smith	Hugh Duffy	30 January 2009	107
Tired of his pet dog, Chester, always biting him in the rear and just generally being incompetent, Zeke decides to draw his own ideal pet. He creates Sketch, a dinosaur-like hybrid animal that is intelligent and eats normally inedible objects like furniture and fences. But things take a turn for the worse when Sketch begins to cause chaos throughout the neighborhood. But luckily, upon him and Jay realizing that Sketch is just lonely and looking for someone like him, they find Sketch a companion — a platypus. A few months later, they send an egg for Zeke to babysit.
7	"Clean Slate"	Tim Golsby-Smith	Nicole Demerse	6 February 2009	106
Zeke is tired of the strict cleaning rules of his mother Ida, and draws a "no-cleaning zone" around his house. Things are reversed right away; the house becomes cluttered and Ida instead enforces strict non-cleaning rules. When their precious things go missing, the family revolts against Ida and Zeke returns cleanliness to the house.
8	"A Little Sketchy"	Tim Golsby-Smith	Alan Resnick	TBA	108
Zeke is tired of Rachel always getting her way, and the last straw comes when a family vacation is cancelled in order to make way for Rachel's theater audition. Wanting payback, Zeke draws himself and Jay inside Rachel's brain, allowing them to control her actions in order to mess up her audition. However, she ends up winning the audition, forcing Zeke and Jay to escape her brain. They end up in her stomach and must get themselves out and return themselves to normal size before it's too late.
9	"Portrait of a Young Artist"	Florian Wagner	Myra Fried	TBA	110
When their parents are out, Ike is left in charge of Zeke. After his curfew forces him to miss out on a party, Zeke uses his Pad to draw himself as an older, but things take a turn for the worse when he start to age rapidly and soon he becomes almost ninety years old. In an attempt to get back down to his normal age, Zeke attempts to draw himself younger, but this causes him to age backwards at a similar rate. Eventually, he returns to his normal age and is content with it.
10	"Drawing Conclusions"	Ian Freedman	Hugh Duffy	TBA	111
While watching a crime show with the Palmers, Jay notices that Zeke doesn't think logically. In order to prove him wrong, Zeke draws himself as the superhero "Zeke Streak", assigning himself the duty of finding Ida's missing personal digital assistant, which she uses to organize her chores. When his methods fail and other precious items disappear as a result, Zeke instead becomes "Zeke of Fury", turning himself and his family into ninjas. Thanks to his calm, peaceful demeanor, he discovers that Chester is the thief.
11	"Gender Render"	Florian Wagner	Nicole Demerse	TBA	112
Zeke attempts to ask Maxine out to a local dance, but she turns him down as she feels unhappy that one of the members of her relay race team just left. Zeke asks to volunteer, but he can't as the team is girls-only. While thinking of a way to infiltrate the team. Zeke (accidentally) draws himself as a girl named Zee, but he has a difficult time adjusting. Maxine later invites Zee to a sleepover, and the two platonically bond over shared interests. They get up early to train and Zee manages to join the relay race with Maxine. As a result, Zeke turns back into a boy and joins Maxine at the dance, but he still fails to dance with her.
12	"Brush With Love"	Tim Golsby-Smith	Alan Resnick	TBA	113
Zeke notices several unrelated incidents that make him believe his parents' marriage is falling apart. He summons Dr. Bill, a popular TV psychologist, to rectify the situation, but his advice only strains their relationship further. Zeke then draws himself as Cupid to try and get his parents back together, but his poorly-aimed arrows only make things worse. Worried that his parents will cancel a dinner date that Maxine will also attend, Zeke confesses the truth, and the date continues.
13	"King Of The Pad"	Ian Freedman	Myra Fried	TBA	115
Frustrated over being grounded, Zeke draws himself as the king of his town to get of his parents control. He passes absurd laws and proceeds to use his power punish Ike when he criticizes them. After one of his bodyguards is poisoned, he realizes people secretly hate him. He strips everyone of the ability to lie, but this backfires when a mob forms in front of his house and demands his ousting.
14	"Family Portrait"	Tim Golsby-Smith	Alan Resnick	TBA	109
After continuously being annoyed by his family, Zeke erases himself from a family picture, turning him invisible. He uses this ability to scare his parents out of the house, having Jay pose as a paranormal researcher to convince them that the house is haunted. At first, Zeke enjoys his newfound solitude, but a chain of events makes him believe there is a real ghost in the house, forcing him to bring his family back.
15	"Unstill Life"	Florian Wagner	Hugh Duffy	TBA	114
A local art gallery is hosting a contest for young artists, but the submissions have to be sculptures. Because of his bad sculpting skills, Zeke uses his Pad to create a replica of The Joseph, a lost statue purportedly created by Michelangelo. However, the statue comes to life, so Zeke and Jay have to catch him and freeze him with a calcite solution to enter him into the contest. However, the credit for The Joseph goes to a janitor who discovered it, so Zeke has to enter his sloppy sculpture instead.
16	"Drawn Out Holiday"	Tim Golsby-Smith	Liz Scully	TBA	116
Zeke doesn't want to return to school after the summer holidays, so he draws a calendar where every day is a random holiday. This causes his family to have extravagant celebrations day after day, which slowly takes a toll on him. On the other hand, the normally studious Jay becomes a carefree party freak, and even steals the Pad to prevent Zeke from returning things to normal. In a fight to get it back, Zeke accidentally breaks the Pad, so he has to win Jay back to get in fixed. He successfully ends the celebrations, only to create endless school days in its place.
17	"Gifted Artist"	Tim Golsby-Smith	Hugh Duffy	TBA	117
It's Ida's birthday and Zeke is struggling to come up with the perfect gift for her. He eventually settles on a robotic vacuum cleaner, but it goes rogue and destroys everything in its path. Zeke and Jay try to delay the celebration, but they fail, and Zeke is placed under extreme pressure to create a new gift. He accidentally brings a random squiggle to life, which Ida accepts, touched by his thoughtfulness.
18	"Wherefore Art Thou"	Tim Golsby-Smith	Carolyn Hay	TBA	118
Zeke wishes to audition for a musical adaptation of Romeo and Juliet so he can be around Maxine, who will be starring as the female lead. To prepare, he draws himself with the perfect singing voice, but this causes him to sing whenever he talks. When that becomes annoying, he instead creates magical dance shoes that make him an amazing dancer, which he can control via the Pad. However, the Pad gets a virus, and he starts dancing out of control. He crashes the performance and Jay—who is a fan of Shakespeare himself—is cast in his place.
19	"Sketch Comedy"	Ian Freedman	Story by : Carolyn Hay and Alan Resnick; Teleplay by : Alan Resnick	TBA	119
Zeke and Maxine are paired for a science presentation about the environment. They think about adding humor to catch the listeners' attention, but Zeke worries that no one will find him funny, so he uses the Pad to make people laugh at his jokes. However, everyone laughs at everything he says, so he decides to make people take him seriously. When he blurts out "save the squirrels" as an example of how to care for the environment, people take notes and try to demolish a house to save the squirrels' habitat. In the end, he gives his abilities to Jay, who reminds everybody that squirrels aren't endangered.
20	"Art Is Bigger Than Life"	Florian Wagner	Liz Scully	TBA	120
When Ida gets into an accident, Zeke tries to care for his mother, but Ike keeps outperforming him at whatever he does and earning their mother's respect. Tired of being "little", Zeke draws himself at Ike's size, but Ike continues to one-up him. Zeke then becomes an eight-foot-tall, muscular man who cannot control his own strength. At school, he scares everyone, and when he is accidentally spilled with paint, he gets mistaken for a monster. Zeke later realizes the error of his ways and returns to his normal size.
21	"Artful Dodger"	Ian Freedman	Hugh Duffy	TBA	121
Zeke hasn't studied for an upcoming science test, so he draws a snowstorm in order to delay the test and get more time to study. However, the storm ends up freezing the entire world, and the unprepared Palmers can neither eat, entertain themselves, nor go outside. In an attempt to fix the situation, Zeke draws the sun to melt the snow, but the differing air temperatures cause a tornado that brings the house to a desert-covered place. To help his family survive, Zeke must use what he learned in science class—in the form of drawings on his Pad.
22	"Picture Of Paradise"	Florian Wagner	Story by : Carolyn Hay; Teleplay by : Steve Sullivan	TBA	122
Zeke is upset when he finds out that Maxine will be going to a girls' only summer camp. He draws himself and his family at a campground next to theirs; however, everyone but him is less than enthusiastic. Zeke and Jay try to impress Maxine, but they fail. They attempt to help Maxine with a navigational exercise, but they get lost themselves. Zeke later manages to save Maxine from a bear attack, and the two bond at the former's camp.
23	"Model Family"	Ian Freedman	Story by : Carolyn Hay; Teleplay by : Steve Sullivan	TBA	123
In an effort to learn more about his family tree, Zeke draws a picture of his ancestors, sending them forward in time. They are confused by the modern world and provide little in the way of useful information. Jay reminds Zeke that if the past Palmers stay for too long, he might cease to exist, so they attempt to send Zeke's ancestors back to their time. However, it proves very difficult when they find out Rachel's past lookalike Rafael is a notorious pickpocket who swiped many things, including the Pad.
24	"Luck Of The Draw"	Tim Golsby-Smith	Liz Scully	TBA	124
Zeke and his family are chosen to compete on Brain vs. Brawn, a game show that involves trivia questions and obstacle courses. Zeke decides to draw his family as a team to help them win against the Smartlys, a family of geniuses. However, they are too obsessed with cheerleading to study and they lose the trivia round. For the obstacle round, Zeke strips his family of their team spirit, only to turn them into mindless zombies who do only what Zeke tells them to. Finally, for the third round, a relay race, Zeke gives his family both a team spirit and independent thinking, enabling them to win the grand prize—a vacation to Hawaii.
25	"Board Strokes"	Tim Golsby-Smith	Story by : Carolyn Hay; Teleplay by : Steve Sullivan	TBA	125
Zeke's favorite skateboarder, Rip Ryker, visits the town to host a skateboarding contest, where the winner will get to join him on a promotional tour. Zeke draws a high-tech skateboard to help him win, but it is confiscated by Rip. Realizing that the contest should be fair, Zeke turns his special board into iridium, making it immobile, challenging Rip on a normal skateboard. Zeke fails because of a trick plotted by Rip, but he accepts his loss, no longer wanting to go on the tour.
26	"Zeke's Pad"	Tim Golsby-Smith	Story by : Carolyn Hay; Teleplay by : Nicole Demerse	9 January 2010	126
In the series finale, Zeke wants to live on his own, so he convinces his parents to live in the garage. He then proceeds to turn it into a teen hangout full of the things he likes, and soon everyone in town—including his family—decides to join in on the fun. When it begins to get too crowded, he implements a guest list so that only certain people can enter, but he forgot to add his name, so he is kicked out. He is forced to dig under his house in order to enter the garage, but this causes the house to collapse. Zeke and Jay use all the wood making up the shed to stabilize the house, and the former realizes it's okay to live with his family.

== Broadcast history ==
Prior to its Canadian premiere on YTV, the show had been broadcast in more than a dozen countries: Australia (Seven Network), Germany (ZDF), France on (Canal+ Family), Poland (ZigZap), India and Sri Lanka (Sun TV), Spain (Televisió de Catalunya), Latin America and Brazil (Cartoon Network), and the Middle East (Spacetoon).

== Awards and nominations ==
- Zeke's Pad won the Best Animation TV Production and Best Art Direction awards at the 2010 Elan Awards.
- Zeke's Pad was nominated for the Australian Film Institute Award for Best Children's Television Animation in 2010.
