= Juan Darién: A Carnival Mass =

Cast recording by Elliot Goldenthal
- Released: October 29, 1996
- Genre: Classical, avant-garde
- Length: 59:50
- Label: Sony Classical
- Producer: Joel Iwataki

Elliot Goldenthal chronology
'Fire Water Paper: A Vietnam Oratorio' (1996)	Juan Darién: A Carnival Mass (1996)	'Othello' (1998)

Professional ratings
Review scores
Source	Rating
MusicFromTheMovies	2.5/5 stars
New York Times	Reasonable

Juan Darién: A Carnival Mass is a musical with music and lyrics by Elliot Goldenthal and a book by Goldenthal and Julie Taymor. The musical premiered Off-Broadway in 1988 in the former St. Clement's Church. It was subsequently reworked and refined before playing on Broadway in 1996 at the Vivian Beaumont Theatre, directed by Taymor.

== Plot ==
The musical, based on a modern fable of the same name by Horacio Quiroga, is set in the jungle in South America, with a jaunty skeletal Death ever present. Its story concerns an orphaned jaguar cub who is miraculously transformed into a human child by the compassion of a woman who has lost her own baby; the boy must then confront the savagery of human civilization. The production employs masked actors and puppets, and the score includes elements of Latin American folk music and the Requiem Mass. The piece was revived and toured extensively.

== History ==
Goldenthal collaborated closely with the musical's director Julie Taymor, his romantic partner, to create a score that would complement their off-beat concept, blending musical styles with a carnival version of a Requiem Mass sung in Latin and Spanish, primal jungle calls, sharp-edged jazz and hints of minimalism. It was well received by critics. Goldenthal played the small role of Circus Barker/Streetsinger. The piece is sometimes described as a passion play.

== Track listing ==
1. Agnus Dei (2:02)
2. Lacrymosa / Mr. Bones Fanfare (8:56)
3. Jaguar Cub Approach (1:48)
4. Mr. Bones' Two-Step (0:55)
5. The Hunter's Entrance (1:37)
6. Gloria (2:39)
7. Initiation (1:11)
8. A Round at Midnight (1:52)
9. Sanctus (2:08)
10. School (3:51)
11. Recordare (4:12)
12. Carnaval (7:45)
13. Lullabye – Lyrics by Elliot Goldenthal (2:47)
14. Trance – Lyrics by Horacio Quiroga (2:18)
15. Dies Irae (12:17)
16. Lacrymosa II / Retribution (3:32)

== Crew/performers ==
- Music Composed by Elliot Goldenthal
- Recording Produced by Joel Iwataki
- Directed by Julie Taymor, Musical Direction by Richard Cordova
- Recorded and Mixed by Joel Iwataki
- Juan (Boy Soprano): Devin Provenzano
- Mother (Contralto): Andrea Frierson Toney
- Circus Barker/Streetsinger (Baritone): Elliot Goldenthal

== Television broadcast ==
A recording of a 1990 performance was broadcast in the UK on August 31, 1990.

== Awards and nominations ==
Year	Award	Category	Nominee	Result	Ref.
1997	Tony Award	Best Musical		Nominated	
1997	Tony Award	Best Original Score	Elliot Goldenthal	Nominated	
1997	Tony Award	Best Direction of a Musical	Julie Taymor	Nominated	
1997	Tony Award	Best Scenic Design	G. W. Mercier and Julie Taymor	Nominated	
1997	Tony Award	Best Lighting Design	Donald Holder	Nominated	
1997	Drama Desk Award	Outstanding Musical		Nominated	
1997	Drama Desk Award	Outstanding Scenic Design of a Musical	G. W. Mercier and Julie Taymor	Nominated	
1997	Drama Desk Award	Outstanding Costume Design	G. W. Mercier and Julie Taymor	Nominated	
1997	Drama Desk Award	Outstanding Lighting Design	Donald Holder	Nominated	
1997	Outer Critics Circle Award	Outstanding Revival of a Musical		Nominated	
