= Jerry Silverman =

American folksinger, guitar teacher and author (born 1931)

Jerry Silverman (born 1931) is an American folksinger, guitar teacher and author of music books. He has had over 200 books published, which have sold in the millions, including folk song collections, anthologies and method books for the guitar, banjo and fiddle. He has taught guitar to hundreds of students. He has presented concerts and lectures at schools, universities and concert halls in the U.S. and abroad.

Among his notable books are the two volumes of The Folksinger's Guitar Guide for Oak Publications in 1962 and '64; The Undying Flame: Ballads and Songs of the Holocaust’’ (Syracuse University Press, 2002), which contains 110 songs in 16 languages - Yiddish, German, Hebrew, Spanish, French, Dutch, Italian, Ladino, Serbo-Croatian, Greek, Norwegian, Czech, Polish, Russian, Hungarian and English. The songs include the works of concentration camp prisoners and inhabitants of the ghettos of Eastern Europe as well anti-Fascist anthems inspired by the Spanish Civil War, Red Army songs, and songs of Resistance fighters; New York Sings – 400 Years of the Empire State in Song (reviewed by his friend and colleague Pete Seeger). Seeger and Silverman were both editors at Sing Out! A Folk Music Magazine in the 1960s.; The Baseball Songbook – Songs and Images from the Early Years of America’s Favorite Pastime; The Folk Song Encyclopedia (a two volume compilation of over 1,000 folk songs; words, music and guitar chords); The Complete Book of Bach Chorales (translated into English); Ballads and Songs of the Civil War (piano-vocal with guitar chords); The Guitar Player's Guide and Almanac (a combined method book and survey of musical, technical and anecdotal information); Of Thee I Sing (patriotic American songs from the Revolutionary War to the present).

== Early life ==
Jerry’s father, Bill (b. London, 1896) and mother Helen Mindlin (b. Dubrovna, Russia, 1898) were married in New York in 1928. They followed the newly constructed subway line from the crowded tenements of the Lower East Side of Manhattan to the northeast Bronx in the Allerton neighborhood, near Bronx Park and the New York Botanical Garden. It was populated largely by eastern European Jewish immigrant families. Gerard “Jerry” Silverman (b. 1931) was their only child. Bill was a self employed fabric supplier for Broadway theatrical productions, but was also an accomplished amateur mandolin player. Jerry began taking classical mandolin lessons at the nearby Neighborhood Music School with teacher Matthew Kahn at age 10. In the summer of 1945, Jerry attended Camp Wo-Chi-Ca (Workers Children’s Camp) in Hackettstown, New Jersey, where for the first time he was exposed to 78 rpm recordingsof folk singer Woody Guthrie, blues singer Josh White, The Almanac Singers, Pete Seeger, Paul Robeson (who was the “patron saint” of the camp), union songs and songs of the Spanish Civil War. It was a life-changing experience for him. He began teaching himself the guitar when he returned home from camp. Jerry returned to Wo-Chi-Ca (with guitar) in 1946, and as a counselor in 1947 and 1948, where he met Joe Jaffe, who played banjo and guitar with Seeger occasionally. Jerry started studying with Joe at the Neighborhood Music School in 1947. In 1948, Jaffe suggested that Jerry take over as the guitar teacher at the School when he left. Jerry graduated from Christopher Columbus High School in the Bronx in 1948, enrolled in CCNY (City College of New York) in Spring 1949 and graduated in Spring 1952 with a B.S. degree in Music. He was the first “non-classical” music major to earn that degree. In 1955 he earned a Master’s degree in Musicology at NYU (New York University). The subject of his master’s dissertation: “THE BLUES GUITAR – As Illustrated by the Practices of Blind Lemon Jefferson, Huddie Ledbetter (Leadbelly) and Josh White.” The research he conducted on blues led directly to the publication in 1958 by MacMillan of his first book: “Folk Blues”, which contains 110 traditional blues arranged for voice, piano and guitar. Here is a brief excerpt from the introduction to the book which sets the tone of the work: “In spite of the perennial popularity of blues songs…no collection has ever been available before now. I became aware of the scarcity of published scholarly material dealing with the blues and the complete absence of any general folk blues collections before now while doing graduate work in music at New York University. Since then, as a teacher and professional performer, I have been plagued by this glaring and inexplicable sin of omission – so much so that I decided to do the job myself.”

== Sing Out! Magazine ==
In 1951, Silverman began writing music transcriptions and arrangements for the new monthly publication ‘’Sing Out!, The Folksong Magazine’’. Eventually, he took on full responsibility as the Music Editor. Fundraising for the magazine led to well-publicized Hootenannys, which were led by Pete Seeger, and where Silverman performed regularly. Many of these “hoots” were recorded on LP, and a notable recording of "Mule-Skinner Blues" included Silverman on lead, accompanied by Seeger and Sonny Terry on harmonica.

== Career ==
In 1952, Silverman was the first non-classical student to graduate from CCNY with a B.S. of Music. He then entered the graduate studies of Musicology program at New York University, also the first folk musician to enter into this program. After writing his Masters Thesis on "the blues guitar”, Macmillan published his first book “Folk Blues” in 1958.

‘’Folkways Records’’ asked Silverman to expand the 16-page instructional brochure that had been inserted into the jacket of Seeger’s ‘’Folkways’’ LP. The book, entitled “The Folksinger’s Guitar Guide” was published in 1962. It was the first guitar instruction book for folksinging guitarists and sold well over 300,000 copies. Silverman added Volume 2 The Folksinger's Guitar Guide, An Advanced Instruction Guide, in 1964, followed by a long series of other method books and folksong anthologies. He has had over 200 books published since, with the last being New York Sings! in March 2009.

== Personal life ==
He currently lives in Westchester, New York. In 1967, he married Tatiana Cherniacoski and they have three children: David (b. 1969), Mikael (b. 1978) and Antoine Silverman (b. 1972).

== Partial bibliography ==
- Of Thee I Sing
- The Baseball Songbook
- The Undying Flame: Ballads and Songs of the Holocaust
- The Guitarists’ Guide and Almanac
- A Guitarist's Treasury of Song
- Ballads and Songs of the Civil War
- Songs of Ireland
- Songs of England
- Songs of Scotland
- Recorder Music for Children
- Folksongs For Schools And Camps
- Kidsongs
- Kidfiddle
- Campfire Songbook
- Songs Of Mexico
- Backpacker's Songbook
- Guitar Tabsongs: Blues
- Guitar Tabsongs: Bluegrass
- Guitar Tabsongs: Beloved Ballads
- Blues for Guitar
- Blues Harmonica
- Children's Songs for Guitar
- Folk Harmonica
- Fingerstyle Contemporary Movie Songs
- Fingerstyle Broadway Ballads
- Fingerstyle TV Tunes for Guitar
- Best of Broadway for Guitar
- Gershwin for Guitar
- Ellington for Guitar
- Swinging Jazz for Guitar
- Jazz Classics for Guitar
- Great Standards For Guitar
- Pop Classics for Guitar
- The Ultimate Guitar Folk Song Collection
- Three Chords for Christmas Guitar
- Solo Guitar Jazz Standards
- Solo Guitar Great Standards
- Folk Blues (In German edition. Text in German; songs in English.)
- The Folk Song Encyclopedia (2 vols. -over 1000 songs)
- The Folksinger's Guitar Guide (3 vols.)
- The Yiddish Song Book
- The Immigrant Song Book
- The American History Song Book
- Ballads And Songs Of World War I
- Songs That Made History Around The World
- Songs And Stories From The American Revolution
- Songs Of The Western Frontier
- Train Songs
- Mexican Songs
- Songs Of France
- Songs Of Latin America
- Italian Songs And Arias
- Gypsy Songs of Russia and Hungary
- Songs of Germany
- How To Play The Guitar
- Note Reading and Music Theory for Guitarists
- The Chord Player's Encyclopedia
- Traditional Black Music (13 vols.)
- Singing Our Way Out West'
- Beginning The Five-String Banjo
- How to Play Country Fiddle
- How to Play Blues Guitar
- How to Play Ragtime Guitar
- The Liberated Woman’s Song Book
- String Along With Scott (String quartet arrangements of Scott Joplin rags)
- Just Listen To This Song I’m Singing (Afro-American history through song.)
- The Complete Chorales Of Johann Sebastian Bach
- Folk Guitar - Folk Song
- The Flat-Picker's Guitar Guide
