= Shadow Play Scherzo =

Shadow Play Scherzo is an orchestral composition by the American composer Elliot Goldenthal. The work was commissioned in 1988 by ASCAP in honour of Leonard Bernstein's 70th birthday. It was first performed by the Brooklyn Philharmonic on May 24, 1988, at The Town Hall, New York City.
