= Othello (ballet) =

Live album by San Francisco Ballet Orchestra
- Released: June 2, 1998
- Recorded: Davies Symphony Hall, April 20, 1998.
- Genre: Classical, Avant-garde
- Length: 69:05
- Label: Varèse Sarabande, Cat.VSD-5942
- Producer: Joel Iwataki

Elliot Goldenthal chronology
Juan Darien: A Carnival Mass (1996)	Othello (1998)	The Green Bird (1999)

Othello is a ballet in three acts based on the play of the same name by William Shakespeare. Choreography by Lar Lubovitch is set to an orchestral score composed by Elliot Goldenthal and released commercially on the Varèse Sarabande label. Originally produced in 1997, the ballet was commissioned by the American Ballet Theatre and the San Francisco Ballet.

The score is generally less atonal than many of Goldenthal's film scores but vastly more complex as he is required to provide not only the music but also all of the complex ambience and to set the pace and rhythm for the dancers on the stage.

== Album track listing ==
1. Act I: Sarabande (3:12)
2. Act I: Entrada (2:24)
3. Act I: Carnival Dance (2:09)
4. Act I: Cassio (2:36)
5. Act I: Formal Court Dance (5:09)
6. Act I: Othello And Desdemona (6:08)
7. Act I: Zigzag Dance (1:47)
8. Act I: Iago And Emilia (5:06)
9. Act II: Storm And Ships' Arrival (8:51)
10. Act II: Tarantella (14:12)
11. Act III: Lies And Variations: Lies And Variations/Iago And Othello/Othello's Solo Dance (7:44)
12. Act III: Desdemona's Prayer (5:25)
13. Act III: Adagietto And Coda Agitato (6:25)

== Album crew ==
- Music Composed and Orchestrated by Elliot Goldenthal
- Recording Produced by Joel Iwataki
- Executive Producer: Robert Townson
- Performed by the San Francisco Ballet Orchestra
- Conducted by Emil de Cou
- Recorded and Mixed and Edited by Joel Iwataki
