= The Tempest (2010 film) =

2010 film directed by Julie Taymor

- Theatrical release poster
- Directed by: Julie Taymor
- Screenplay by: Julie Taymor
- Based on: The Tempest by William Shakespeare
- Produced by: Julie Taymor; Robert Chartoff; Lynn Hendee; Julia Taylor-Stanley; Jason K. Lau
- Starring: Helen Mirren; Russell Brand; Reeve Carney; Tom Conti; Chris Cooper; Alan Cumming; Djimon Hounsou; Felicity Jones; Alfred Molina; David Strathairn; Ben Whishaw
- Cinematography: Stuart Dryburgh
- Edited by: Françoise Bonnot
- Music by: Elliot Goldenthal
- Production companies: Miramax Films; Chartoff/Hendee Productions; TalkStory Productions; Artemis Films; Mumbai Mantra Media Limited
- Distributed by: Walt Disney Studios Motion Pictures (Note: Distributed under the Touchstone Pictures banner.)
- Release dates: September 11, 2010 (Venice); December 10, 2010 (United States)
- Running time: 110 minutes
- Country: United States
- Language: English
- Budget: $20 million
- Box office: $346,594

The Tempest is a 2010 American fantasy comedy-drama film based on the 1611 play by William Shakespeare. In this version, the gender of the main character, Prospero, is changed from male to female; the role was played by Helen Mirren. The film was written and directed by Julie Taymor and premiered at the Venice Film Festival on September 11, 2010.

The Tempest was released theatrically by Walt Disney Studios Motion Pictures through the Touchstone Pictures banner on December 10, 2010. Although the film received generally mixed reviews from critics, Sandy Powell received her ninth Academy Award nomination for Best Costume Design.

== Plot ==
Prospera, the duchess of Milan, is secretly denounced as a sorceress and usurped by her brother Antonio, with aid from Alonso, the King of Naples, and is cast off in a small boat to die with her three-year-old daughter Miranda. They survive, finding themselves stranded on an island where the human beast Caliban is the sole inhabitant. Prospera enslaves Caliban, frees the captive spirit Ariel, and claims the island. After 12 years, Alonso sails back to his kingdom after the marriage of his daughter to the prince of Tunisia, accompanied by his son Ferdinand, his brother Sebastian and Antonio. Prospera, seizing her chance for revenge, with Ariel's help causes a tempest, wrecking the ship and stranding those on board on her island.

== Cast ==
- Helen Mirren as Prospera, a sorceress and Miranda's mother
- Ben Whishaw as Ariel, a spirit who aids Prospera
- Djimon Hounsou as Caliban, Prospera's slave
- Felicity Jones as Miranda, Prospera's daughter who falls in love with Ferdinand
- David Strathairn as Alonso, Ferdinand's father and King of Naples
- Tom Conti as Gonzalo, a counselor to Alonso who gave aid to Prospera and Miranda
- Reeve Carney as Ferdinand, Alonso's son who falls in love with Miranda
- Chris Cooper as Antonio, Prospera's brother and Miranda's uncle
- Alan Cumming as Sebastian, Alonso's brother
- Alfred Molina as Stephano, Alonso's butler
- Russell Brand as Trinculo, Alonso's jester

== Production ==
The film, based on the play of the same name by William Shakespeare, is written and directed by Julie Taymor. The play's main character is Prospero, a male in the original play. Taymor explained the casting decision, "I didn't really have a male actor that excited me in mind, and yet there had been a couple of phenomenal females – Helen Mirren being one of them – who [made me think]: 'My God, does this play change? What happens if you make that role into a female role?'" Taymor held a reading and found that the story could accommodate the change of gender without being gimmicky.

In Shakespeare's play, Prospero is the Duke of Milan. In the adaptation, Prospera is married to the Duke. She is "more overtly wronged" than Prospero; when the duke dies, Prospera's brother Antonio (played by Chris Cooper) accuses her of killing him with witchcraft. Antonio makes the accusation to be rid of Prospera and claim her royal title. Taymor said, "She had her whole life taken away from her because she was a woman." Prospera wants to prevent the same thing from happening to her daughter.

Principal photography took place around volcanic areas of the big island of Hawaii and Lanai.

== Release ==
The Tempest premiered at the Venice Film Festival on September 11, 2010, as the festival's closing film. When Disney sold Miramax Films to Filmyard Holdings, LLC on December 3, 2010, Disney took over distribution through its Touchstone Pictures label. The film was released on December 10, 2010.

=== Reception ===
The film has received mixed to negative reviews from critics; Rotten Tomatoes maintains that 31% of 88 reviewers gave a positive review with an average score of 4.69/10. The site's consensus states: "Director Julie Taymor's gender-swapping of roles and some frenzied special effects can't quite disguise an otherwise stagey, uninspired take on Shakespeare's classic." It also has a score of 43 out of 100 on Metacritic, based on 28 critics, indicating "mixed or average reviews".

Entertainment Weekly said the film – "theatrically ambitious, musically busy, and in the end cinematically inert – clearly reflects the authorship of myth-loving director Julie Taymor." USA Today found that "Mirren keeps the film on track. But incomprehensible shouting and pointless shenanigans obscure subtle moments." In a similar vein, Newsweek said "the film's special effects, to a surprising extent, add little to the story", and that "next to the concise power of [Shakespeare's] language, the screen wizardry of even a resourceful director like Taymor seems like rough magic indeed". However, The New Yorker's David Denby pointed out the film's strengths, most particularly Helen Mirren's performance as Prospera: "Mirren has the range and power to play a woman with unprecedented control of the elements, and over men, too." Sandra Hall in The Sydney Morning Herald is more generous toward Taymor's vision, saying, "In the scene that explains the circumstances of mother and daughter's banishment from the dukedom of Milan, Taymor has skillfully tweaked Shakespeare's lines to take account of her new scenario", and praising the film's visual elements.

=== Accolades ===
Award	Date of ceremony	Category	Nominee
Academy Awards	February 27, 2011	Best Costume Design	Sandy Powell
Satellite Awards	December 19, 2010	Best Actress	Helen Mirren

== See also ==
- List of William Shakespeare screen adaptations
