= Fire Water Paper: A Vietnam Oratorio =

Studio album by Elliot Goldenthal
- Released: 1996
- Recorded: April 1995
- Studios: Orange County Performing Arts Center, Costa Mesa, California
- Genres: Classical, avant-garde
- Length: 65:43
- Label: Sony Classical
- Producer: Steven Epstein

Elliot Goldenthal chronology
Fire Water Paper: A Vietnam Oratorio (1996)	'Juan Darien: A Carnival Mass' (1996)

Professional ratings
Review scores
Source	Rating
Soundtrack-Express	link
The New York Times	Reasonable
Wired	Favourable

Fire Water Paper: A Vietnam Oratorio is a large scale orchestral oratorio composed by Elliot Goldenthal, commissioned by the Pacific Symphony in 1993 for the 20th Anniversary of the end of the Vietnam War.

== The album ==
It was performed publicly and recorded in mid 1995 and released commercially in 1996. Yo-Yo Ma performed Solo Cello on "Part I"; other performers include: The Pacific Chorale & Children's Chorus, the Ngan-Khoi Vietnamese Children's Choir, Ann Panagulias and James Maddalena; it was conducted by Carl St. Clair.

It is not considered an archetypal oratorio as it doesn't tell a story so much as it brings together many different poems and words of praise, the latter adding a sort of religious aspect in the form of requiem.

== Track listing ==
1. Part I: Offertorium (32:08)
2. Part II: Scherzo (giằng co) (14:14)
3. Part III: Hymn (19:19)

== Crew and performers ==
- Music Composed by Elliot Goldenthal
- Produced by Steven Epstein
- Performed by Yo-Yo Ma, Solo Cello (Part I)
- Ann Panagulias, Soprano & James Maddalena, Baritone
- Pacific Chorale & Children's Chorus
- Ngan-Khoi Vietnamese Children's Chorus
- Pacific Symphony Orchestra, Conducted by Carl St. Clair
- Engineer: Richard King
