= Lar Lubovitch =

American choreographer (born 1943)

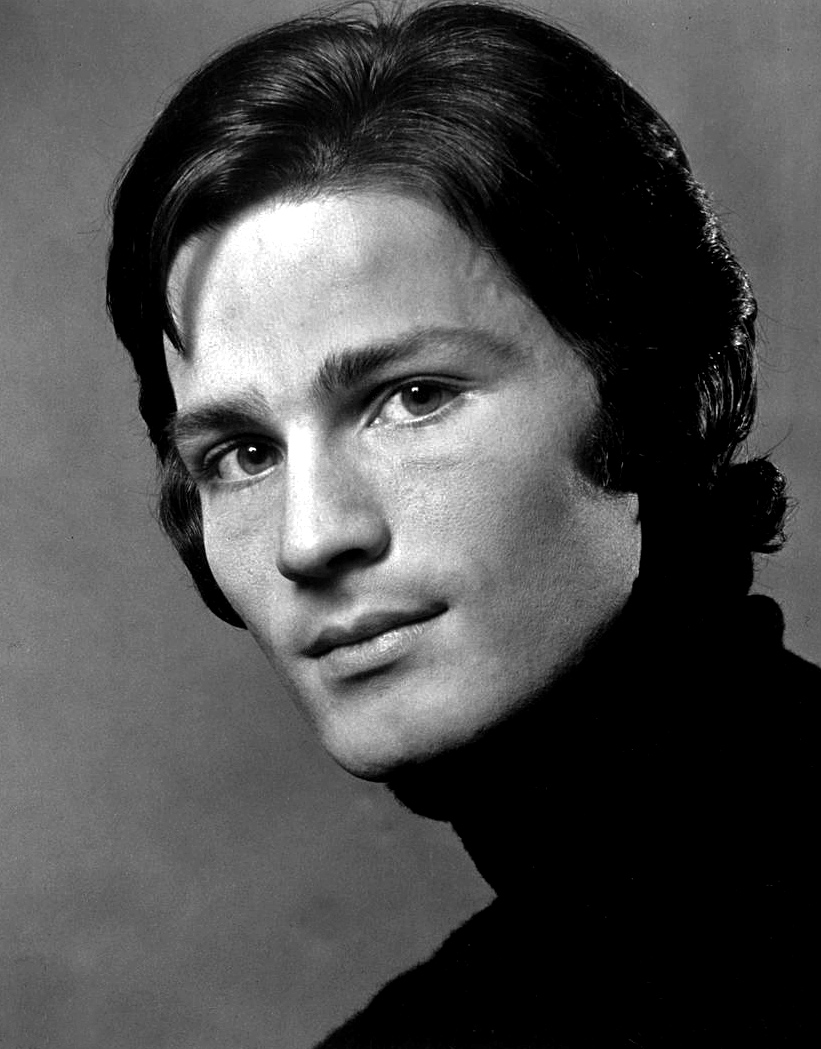
- Lubovitch in 1971
- Born: April 9, 1943 (age 83); Chicago, Illinois, U.S.
- Education: Juilliard School (1964)
- Occupation: choreographer
- Years active: 1964–present
- Known for: Lar Lubovitch Dance Company

Lar Lubovitch (born April 9, 1943) is an American choreographer. He founded his own dance company, the Lar Lubovitch Dance Company in 1968. Based in New York City, the company has performed in all 50 American states as well as in more than 30 countries. As of 2005, he had choreographed more than 100 dances for the company. In addition to the company, Lubovitch has also done creative work in ballet, ice-skating venues, and musical theater, notably Into the Woods. He has played a key role in raising funds to fight AIDS.

== Early life and education ==
Born in Chicago, Lubovitch was educated at the University of Iowa and at New York City's Juilliard School, where he graduated in 1964. His teachers at Juilliard included Antony Tudor, José Limón, Anna Sokolow and Martha Graham.

== Career ==
Lubovitch danced in numerous modern, ballet, jazz and ethnic companies before forming the Lar Lubovitch Dance Company in 1968.

His works are included in the repertories of companies throughout the world, including the New York City Ballet, American Ballet Theatre, Paris Opera Ballet, Royal Danish Ballet, Stuttgart Ballet, Alvin Ailey American Dance Theater, Baryshnikov's White Oak Dance Project and Netherlands Dance Theater. His work is renowned for its musicality, rhapsodic style and sophisticated formal structures. His radiant, highly technical choreography and deeply humanistic voice have been acclaimed throughout the world.

In 1972, Lubovitch won a Guggenheim Fellowship in Choreography. Lubovitch made his Broadway debut in 1987 with the musical staging for the Stephen Sondheim/James Lapine musical, Into the Woods, for which he received a Tony Award nomination. In 1993 he choreographed the highly praised dance sequences for the Broadway show The Red Shoes. The final ballet from that show joined the repertories of American Ballet Theatre and the National Ballet of Canada. For his work on that show, he received the 1993-94 Astaire Award from the Theater Development Fund.

Starting in 1995, the company began focusing on creating dances in New York and teaching throughout the world. A prolific choreographer, Lubovitch created three new dances during the 2004–05 season. The first, Love Stories, was a collaboration between the Lubovitch company and Hubbard Street Dance Chicago (it premiered in Chicago in March 2005), the second, Do You Be, was created solely with the Lubovitch company in honor of Meredith Monk and premiered in NYC in November 2004). The third, Elemental Brubeck, is a collaboration between the Lubovitch company and the San Francisco Ballet (premiered in Paris in July 2005). Also in 2005 the Lubovitch company collaborated with the Limón Dance Company in the creation of another new dance, and staged its annual New York City season at the 850-seat Skirball Center on Washington Square in November.

In 1996 he created the musical staging (and two new dances) for the Tony Award-winning Broadway revival of The King and I. Most recently he devised the musical staging for Walt Disney's stage version of The Hunchback of Notre Dame in Berlin. In 2004 he was honored with the Elan Award for his outstanding choreography. United States Artists named him a 2011 Fellow.

Recent projects have included: the Lubovitch company's world premiere of My Funny Valentine as part of the company's 2001 season in New York at City Center, and (the year before that) staging the world premiere of its acclaimed hit Men's Stories as part of the company's 2000 season in New York at the Orensanz Center for the Arts. Recent projects also include the creation of a full-evening-length (3-act) ballet composed by Elliot Goldenthal based on Othello in an unprecedented collaboration between the Lubovitch company and American Ballet Theatre and San Francisco Ballet. Othello was broadcast nationwide on PBS's Great Performances and nominated for an Emmy Award for its music. In 2021, Lubovitch choreographed Each in Their Own Time, a duet for Adrian Danchig-Waring and Joseph Gordon to music by Brahms. Since then, it's been performed at New York City Ballet by Danchig-Waring and Taylor Stanley.

In addition to his work for stage, screen and television, Lubovitch has also made a notable contribution to the advancement of choreography in the field of ice dancing. He has created dances for Olympic gold medalists John Curry, Peggy Fleming and Dorothy Hamill and has choreographed a full-length ice-dancing version of The Sleeping Beauty, starring Olympic medalists Robin Cousins and Rosalynn Sumners. The ballet was broadcast throughout Great Britain and America. He also choreographed a TV project with Isabelle and Paul Duchesnay, who won the silver medal for France at the 1992 Olympics. The show, based on The Planets by Gustav Holst, was broadcast by the A&E television network in June 1995 and was nominated for an International Emmy Award, a Cable ACE Award and a Grammy Award. Most recently he created two new ice dances for Paul Wylie, a duet for Renée Roca and Gorsha Sur, and an ensemble piece for the Ice Theatre of New York.

== Significant works ==
- Cavalcade (1980), score by Steve Reich
- A Brahms Symphony (1985), marked Lubovitch's return to early composers
- Into the Woods (1987), choreography for the Stephen Sondheim musical
- Fandango (1990), choreographed without music, and later set to Ravel's "Bolero"
- The Red Shoes (1993), choreography bought by American Ballet Theatre
- Othello (1997), commissioned by American Ballet Theatre and San Francisco Ballet, to a score by Elliot Goldenthal
