= Lar Lubovitch Dance Company =

Lar Lubovitch Dance Company (founded in 1968) is a dance company based in New York City and founded by Lar Lubovitch in the late 1960s. They have performed at Carnegie Hall, and worldwide.

In 2003–04, the Lar Lubovitch Dance Company celebrated its 35th anniversary with:

- The world premiere of Artemis in May 2003 at Lincoln Center. Based on Greek mythology, the ballet has music composed by Christopher Theofanidis and was created in honor of the 2004 Olympic Games in Athens. The company revived the ballet on October 15, 2014, at New York's Joyce Theater with reimagined choreography by Lubovitch and Alessandra Ferri dancing the title role.
- The nationwide TV broadcast of Othello (1997) by PBS in June 2003.
- The world premiere of a new production of Othello in Norway in October 2003.
- The world premiere of Pentimento (2004) in May 2004 as the featured dance during the company's self-produced 35th anniversary season in New York City
- A special anniversary tour including Great Britain and (in the US) the Jacob's Pillow Dance Festival
- Numerous re-stagings around the world of earlier works by the company.

Other recent company work includes "Elemental Brubeck" (2005) (music by Dave Brubeck), "Love Stories" (2005) (to songs sung by Kurt Elling) and "Do You Be" (2005) (to music by Meredith Monk).

In 2002, the company created “…smile with my heart” (2002), a tribute to the legendary Broadway composer Richard Rodgers, and in 2001 the company presented three new dances at City Center:

1. The Wedding (2001) – the premiere of a major new production resulting from a re-imagination of Stravinsky's Les Noces, originally choreographed by Lubovitch 25 years ago
2. My Funny Valentine (2001) – the world premiere of a tribute to the composer Richard Rodgers on the occasion of the centennial of his birth
3. Men's Stories (2000) – the restaging of the company's big hit from the prior year.

The most impressive new work created by the company in the last few years was the acclaimed evening-length version of Othello (1997) – produced by the Lubovitch company in an unprecedented 3-way collaboration with American Ballet Theatre and San Francisco Ballet.

In New York, the company performs most frequently at City Center Theater (12 seasons), in addition to seasons at Avery Fisher Hall (twice), Carnegie Hall (twice), the Joyce Theater, the New York State Theater and other venues.

Based in New York, the company is internationally renowned, having toured extensively throughout America (virtually all 50 states) and the rest of the world (more than 30 countries). In 1995 the company decided to increase its focus on creating new dances (and other activities) in New York (declining all invitations to tour during the past nine years). During the 27 years of touring prior to 1995, the company had been seen in live performances by more than a million people. On television it has been seen by millions more. Nowadays the company limits its performances to New York City and television, except for the special 35th anniversary tour. In recognition of its work, the company has received many awards and grants from the National Endowment for the Arts, the New York State Council on the Arts and numerous foundations.

The company has appeared in the US on nationwide television as part of the PBS “Great Performances” series. The most recent broadcast, featuring Fandango (1989), was honored with an International Emmy Award. In Great Britain the Lar Lubovitch Dance Company was featured on television as part of an hour-long program produced by the BBC, in which the company performed Concerto Six Twenty-Two (1986) and North Star (1978). On June 18, 2003 the company's co-production of Othello (as danced by San Francisco Ballet) was broadcast nationwide on “Great Performances” and watched by 900,000 people.
