= Elan Award =

Choreography award established in 2000

The Elan Award is presented annually to an established choreographer. The awards ceremony, which has been often held at the Fashion Institute of Technology, also serves as an opportunity for up-and-coming choreographers to present original work.

== Recipients ==
- 2000: Graciela Daniele
- 2001: Jerry Mitchell
- 2002: Ann Reinking
- 2003: Rob Marshall
- 2004: Lar Lubovitch
- 2005: Susan Stroman
