= Julie Taymor =

American film and theatre director and writer (born 1952)

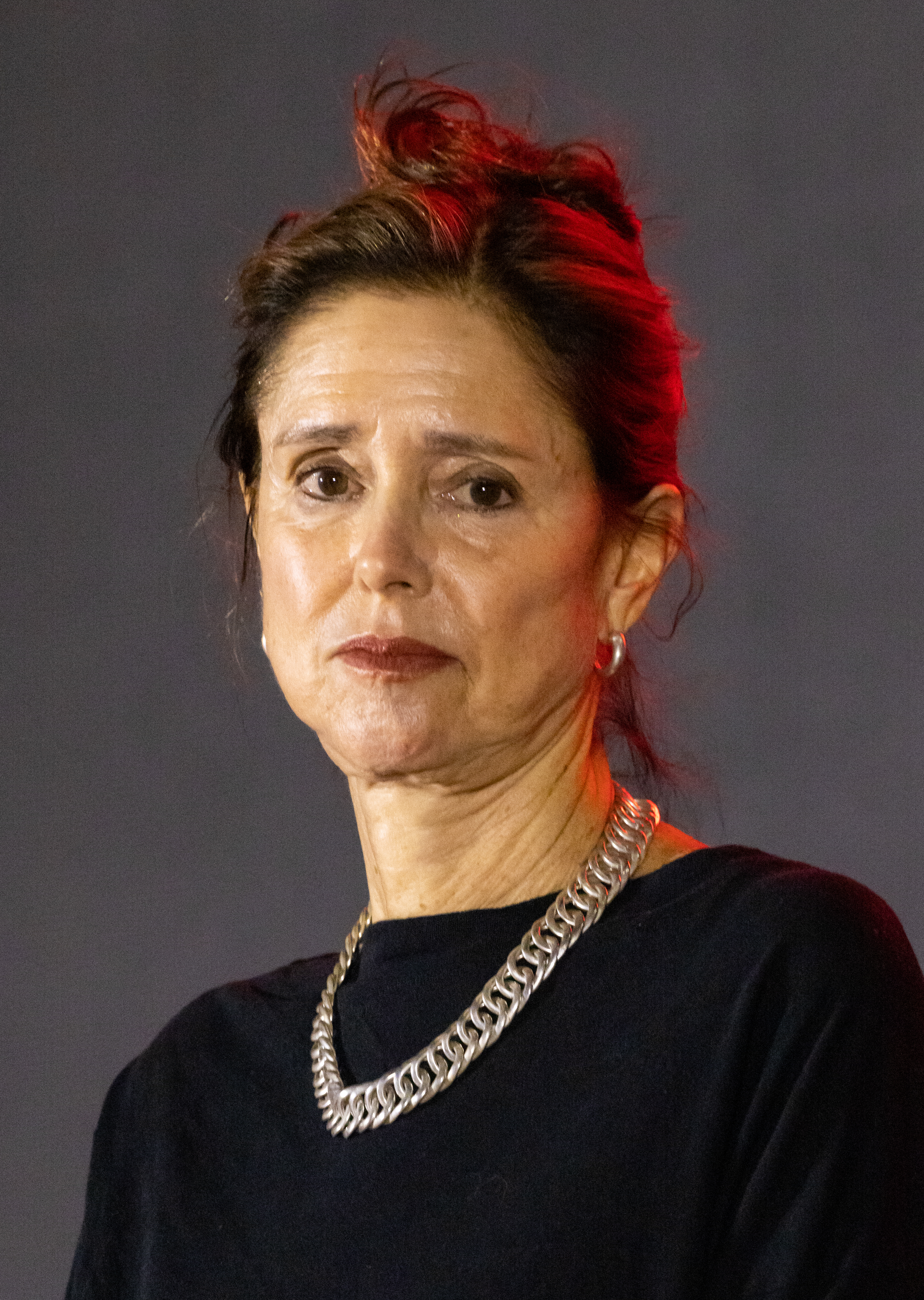
- Taymor, 2022 Tokyo International Film Festival
- Born: December 15, 1952 (age 73); Newton, Massachusetts, U.S.
- Education: L'École Internationale de Théâtre Jacques Lecoq; Oberlin College (BA)
- Occupations: Film and stage director, screenwriter
- Partner: Elliot Goldenthal (1980–present)
- Relatives: Danya Taymor (niece)
- Website: julietaymor.org

Julie Taymor (born December 15, 1952) is an American director and writer of theater, opera, and film. Her stage adaptation of The Lion King debuted in 1997 and received eleven Tony Award nominations, with Taymor receiving Tony Awards for her direction and costume design. Her 2002 film Frida, about Mexican artist Frida Kahlo, was nominated for five Academy Awards, including a Best Original Song nomination for Taymor's composition "Burn It Blue". She also directed the 2007 jukebox musical film Across the Universe, based on the music of the Beatles.

== Early life ==
Taymor was born in Newton, Massachusetts, the daughter of Elizabeth (née Bernstein), a political science professor and Democratic activist, and Melvin Lester Taymor, a gynecologist and prominent fertility researcher later at Harvard Medical School. Taymor's interest in theatre took root early in her life. By age ten, she had joined the Boston Children's Theatre and starred in a number of productions. Being the youngest member of theatre groups became common. By 13, she was taking trips to Boston by herself every weekend, where she discovered Julie Portman's Theatre Workshop. At the age of 15, her parents sent her to both Sri Lanka and India with the Experiment in International Living. After graduating from high school at 16, Taymor went to Paris to study with L'École Internationale de Théâtre Jacques Lecoq. Her studies there exposed her to mime, which helped develop her physical sensibilities. While in Paris, Taymor worked with masks for the first time and immersed herself in film, especially the work of Fellini and Kurosawa.

In 1970 Taymor enrolled at Oberlin College in Ohio. During her second year, she interned with Joseph Chaikin's Open Theatre and other companies in New York City. Hearing that director Herbert Blau was moving to Oberlin, she returned there and auditioned successfully, becoming, once again, the youngest member of a troupe. In 1973, Taymor attended a summer program of the American Society for Eastern Arts in Seattle. The instructors were masters of Indonesian topeng masked dance-drama and wayang kulit shadow puppetry. This would prove to have a great effect on Taymor in later years. Taymor graduated from Oberlin College with a major in mythology and folklore and with Phi Beta Kappa honors in 1974. She spent a summer with Bread and Puppet Theater.

As a college senior, Taymor won a year long Thomas J. Watson Fellowship that began after graduation. The Watson allowed her to travel to Japan and Indonesia, and after the fellowship expired she continued her travels independently from 1975 until 1979. In Indonesia, she developed a mask/dance company, Teatr Loh, consisting of Japanese, Balinese, Sundanese, French, German and American actors, musicians, dancers and puppeteers. The company toured throughout Indonesia with two original productions, Way of Snow and Tirai, which were subsequently performed in the United States. She met her long-time collaborator, Elliot Goldenthal, in 1980.

Taymor was the 2010 commencement speaker for her alma mater, Oberlin College in Oberlin, Ohio.

== Career ==
=== Theatre ===
Julie Taymor sits down for a wide-ranging interview about her work as a director for stage and screen as part of the sixth StageStruck! Conference.

Back in New York from Indonesia, Taymor remounted Tirai at La MaMa in 1980. Her next project, The Haggadah, came from the desire of The Public Theater director Joseph Papp to create an annual Passover pageant that would be culturally inclusive. In 1984, Taymor worked in collaboration with Theatre for a New Audience on a 60-minute version of A Midsummer Night's Dream presented at The Public Theater. Two years later, she directed her first Shakespeare play, The Tempest, for Theatre for a New Audience. She went on to direct three other productions at that theatre: The Taming of the Shrew, Titus Andronicus and The Green Bird by Carlo Gozzi. She later adapted Tempest and Titus into major motion pictures.

Taymor is known for a distinct visual style, with extensive use of puppets and masks, developed largely from her time in Indonesia working with Teatr Loh.

Taymor is most widely recognized for her production of The Lion King, which opened on Broadway in 1997. The Lion King's worldwide gross exceeds that of any entertainment title in box office history, and has been presented in over 100 cities in over 20 countries, having been seen by more than 100 million people worldwide.

Taymor has the distinction of being the first woman to receive the Tony Award for Best Direction of a Musical, which she won for The Lion King. She also received a Tony Award for her original costume designs for the production. Taymor co-designed the masks and puppets, and wrote additional lyrics for the show. In 2007, The Lion King was performed in Johannesburg, and had its first French language production in Paris. In 2008, Le Roi Lion was awarded Best Costume Design, Best Lighting Design, and Best Musical at the Molière Awards, the national theatre awards of France.

In 2000, Taymor directed Carlo Gozzi's The Green Bird on Broadway. The work was first produced in 1996 by Theatre for a New Audience at the New Victory Theater and presented at the La Jolla Playhouse. Taymor's stage production of Shakespeare's Titus Andronicus was produced off-Broadway by Theatre for a New Audience in 1994. Other directing credits include The Tempest, The Taming of the Shrew, The Transposed Heads, based on the novella by Thomas Mann, co-produced by the American Musical Theater Festival and the Lincoln Center; and Liberty's Taken, an original musical co-created with David Suehsdorf and Elliot Goldenthal.

Her original music-theatre work, Juan Darién: A Carnival Mass, presented at Lincoln Center's Vivian Beaumont Theater in 1996, received five Tony Award nominations including Best Director. Originally produced by Music-Theater Group in 1988, Juan Darién: A Carnival Mass was directed by Taymor, and co-written with Elliot Goldenthal. The recipient of two Obies and numerous other awards, the piece was performed at The Edinburgh International Festival, as well as festivals in France, Jerusalem and Montreal, and had an extended run in San Francisco.

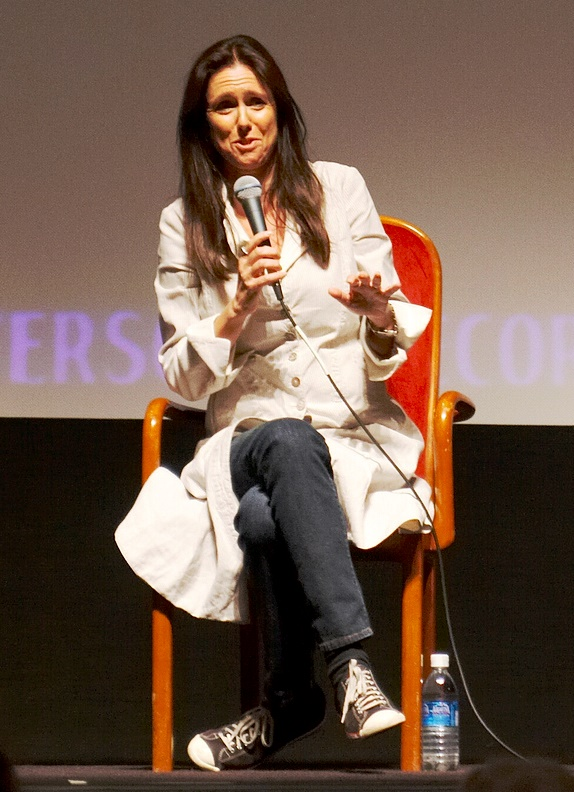
Taymor, 2007 Toronto International Film Festival

In April 2007, it was announced that a musical adaptation of Spider-Man was being prepared for Broadway. Taymor was selected to direct the show and write the book with Glen Berger. The production was to feature music and lyrics by Bono and The Edge. The musical, Spider-Man: Turn Off the Dark, was scheduled to begin previews on November 28, 2010, at the Foxwoods Theatre. The play was delayed for several months due to numerous injuries, and Taymor was fired and replaced by Philip William McKinley. The play officially opened on June 14, 2011, having set the record for the longest preview period in the history of Broadway at 182 performances. The production also set the record for most expensive Broadway production at an estimated $75 million. In November 2011, Taymor sued the show's producers, Michael Cohl and Jeremiah J. Harris, claiming that they were profiting from her creative contributions without compensating her. Taymor and the producers reached a settlement in August 2012.

Taymor was a 2015 inductee into the American Theater Hall of Fame for Lifetime Achievement.

Taymor directed a Broadway revival of David Henry Hwang's M. Butterfly, starring Clive Owen, which opened on October 26, 2017, at the Cort Theatre, with previews beginning on October 7. David Henry Hwang made changes to the original text for the revival, mostly centering on the issue of intersectional identities.

=== Stage production history ===
- Way of Snow (1974–75, 1980) – writer, director, and designer in Java and Bali and The Ark Theater, New York City
- Tirai (1978–79, 1981) – writer, director, and designer in Java and Bali and La MaMa, New York City
- The Haggadah (1980) – sets, costumes, masks, and puppetry produced for the New York Shakespeare Festival/Public Theater, New York City
- Black Elk Lives (1981) – sets, masks, and puppetry produced at Intermedia Theater, New York City
- The King Stag (1984) – costumes, masks, puppetry and choreography produced at ART, Cambridge, Massachusetts
- Liberty's Taken (1985) – director, masks, and puppetry produced at the Castle Hill Festival, Massachusetts
- The Transposed Heads (1984, 1986) – director, masks, and puppetry produced at The Ark Theater, New York City and Lincoln Center
- The Tempest (1986, by Shakespeare, abridged) – director, puppetry. produced for Theatre for a New Audience (TFANA) at Classic Stage Company (New York City)
- The Taming of the Shrew (1988, by Shakespeare) – director, produced by Theatre For a New Audience
- Juan Darién: A Carnival Mass (1988, 1990, 1996) – director, co-bookwriter, co-scenic designer, co-costume designer, mask designer, puppet designer
  – Tony Award co-nomination for Best Scenic Design, Tony Award nomination for Best Direction of a Musical
- Oedipus rex (1992, by Igor Stravinsky) – director, puppetry. at Saito Kinen Festival in Matsumoto (taped for TV, released 1993 / released DVD)
- The Magic Flute (1993, by Mozart – director, costume designer, masks and puppetry designer by Taymor and Michael Curry)
- Titus Andronicus (1994, by Shakespeare) – director, produced by Theatre For a New Audience
- The Flying Dutchman (1996, by Richard Wagner) – director
- Salome (1995 premiere at Passionstheater, Oberammergau, Germany) directed and choreographed by Taymor and Andreas Liyepa
- The Lion King (1997) – director, lyricist for the song "Endless Night", costume designer, co-mask designer, co-puppet designer
  – Tony Award winner for Best Direction of a Musical, Tony Award co-nomination for Best Original Score, Tony Award winner for Best Costume Design
- The Green Bird (1996, 2000) – director, mask designer, puppet designer produced by Theatre for a New Audience at the New Victory Theater (1996), La Jolla, and on Broadway at the Cort Theatre (2000)
- The Magic Flute (premiered 2005, opera by Mozart) – director, Metropolitan Opera, New York, live broadcast
- The Magic Flute (2006), newly translated and abridged version, Metropolitan Opera, Opera Australia (2012)
- Grendel (2007, opera by Elliot Goldenthal) – librettist, director, co-commissioned and performed at the Los Angeles Opera and the Lincoln Center Festival
- Spider-Man: Turn Off the Dark (2010, musical adaptation of Spider-Man) – director, co-author, mask designer, Broadway at the Foxwoods Theatre
- A Midsummer Night's Dream (2013) – director, Theatre for a New Audience, Polonsky Shakespeare Center
- Grounded (2015) – director, The Public Theater
- M. Butterfly (2017) – director, Broadway at the Cort Theatre

=== Film ===
Taymor's first film, Fool's Fire, which she co-directed and adapted from Edgar Allan Poe's short story, "Hop-Frog," was produced by American Playhouse. The hour-long film premiered at the Sundance Film Festival and aired on PBS in March 1992. In the film, all characters except the titular character Hop-Frog are either elaborate puppets or masks, not unlike Taymor's stage work. The film won the Best Drama award at the Tokyo International Electronic Cinema Festival.

Taymor also directed a film adaptation of opera Oedipus rex after directing a stage production of the same opera. The film premiered at the Sundance Film Festival and won the Jury Award at the Montreal Festival of Film on Art. Broadcast internationally in 1993, the film garnered an Emmy Award and the 1994 International Classical Music Award for Best Opera Production.

Taymor's feature film debut, Titus (1999), starring Anthony Hopkins, Jessica Lange, Alan Cumming and Jonathan Rhys Meyers, was an adaptation of Shakespeare's play Titus Andronicus. Taymor adapted the screenplay and produced the film, which received an Academy Award nomination for costume design.

Taymor received critical acclaim for her direction of Salma Hayek and Alfred Molina in Frida (2002), a biographical film about the Mexican artist Frida Kahlo. Frida garnered six Academy Award nominations, including a Best Actress nomination for Hayek, and won two Academy Awards for make-up and original score. Frida was honored with four BAFTA nominations and one win, including nominations for Hayek and Molina, as well as two Golden Globe nominations, winning the Golden Globe for Best Original Score. In addition, the film received two Screen Actors Guild nominations. The film premiered at the Venice Film Festival where it won the festival's Mimmo Rotella Foundation Award.

Her next film was the jukebox musical Across the Universe (2007), which received a Golden Globe nomination for Best Musical/Comedy as well as a nomination for the Academy Award for Costume Design. With a collection of 33 Beatles songs, the film stars Evan Rachel Wood and Jim Sturgess in a 1960s love story set to the music of The Beatles, and featured performances by Bono, Joe Cocker, Eddie Izzard and Salma Hayek. Taymor both directed and co-wrote the story for the film.

In November 2008, Taymor directed a film version of Shakespeare's The Tempest, released in December 2010 starring Helen Mirren, Alfred Molina, Djimon Hounsou and Ben Whishaw. Working behind the camera with Taymor on The Tempest were the Academy Award winners Elliot Goldenthal for music, Sandy Powell for costumes, and Françoise Bonnot. Taymor produced the feature and adapted the screenplay based on Shakespeare's play.

She also completed a cinematic version of William Shakespeare's A Midsummer Night's Dream, starring David Harewood, Max Casella and Kathryn Hunter, and filmed during her critically acclaimed, sold-out stage production that ran at Theatre for a New Audience's new home in Downtown Brooklyn. The film was shown at the 2014 Toronto International Film Festival as part of the Mavericks in Film Programme.

Taymor directed and co-wrote The Glorias, a biopic of feminist icon Gloria Steinem, based on her novel My Life on the Road, starring Julianne Moore, Alicia Vikander, Bette Midler, and Janelle Monae. The movie premiered at the Sundance Film Festival and was released by Amazon Prime on September 30, 2020.

== Works ==
=== Filmography ===
Year	Title	Director	Writer	Producer	Notes
1992	Fool's Fire	Yes	Yes	Yes	TV movie; Also costume designer
1999	Titus	Yes	Yes	Yes	
2002	Frida	Yes	No	No	Also Tango choreographer (credited as Taymor) and lyricist for the song "Burn it Blue"
2007	Across the Universe	Yes	Story	No	
2010	The Tempest	Yes	Yes	Yes	
2019	The Lion King	No	No	executive producer	
2020	The Glorias	Yes	Yes	Yes	Also uncredited cameo

=== Recorded plays/opera ===
Year	Title	Director	Writer	Producer	Puppets	Masks	Notes
1986	The Tempest	Yes	No	No	Yes	No	
1990	Juan Darién: A Carnival Mass	Yes	Yes	No	Yes	Yes	Also co-scenic designer and co-costume designer
1993	Oedipus rex	Yes	No	No	No	Yes	Also sculpture designer and editor; released as an episode of Great Performances
1995	Salome	Yes	No	No	No	No	Also co-choreographer; Co-directed and co-choreographed with Andreas Liyepa
1997	The Lion King	Yes	No	Yes	Yes	Yes	Also lyricist for the song "Endless Night" and costume designer
2014	A Midsummer Night's Dream	Yes	No	No	No	No	

=== Opera ===
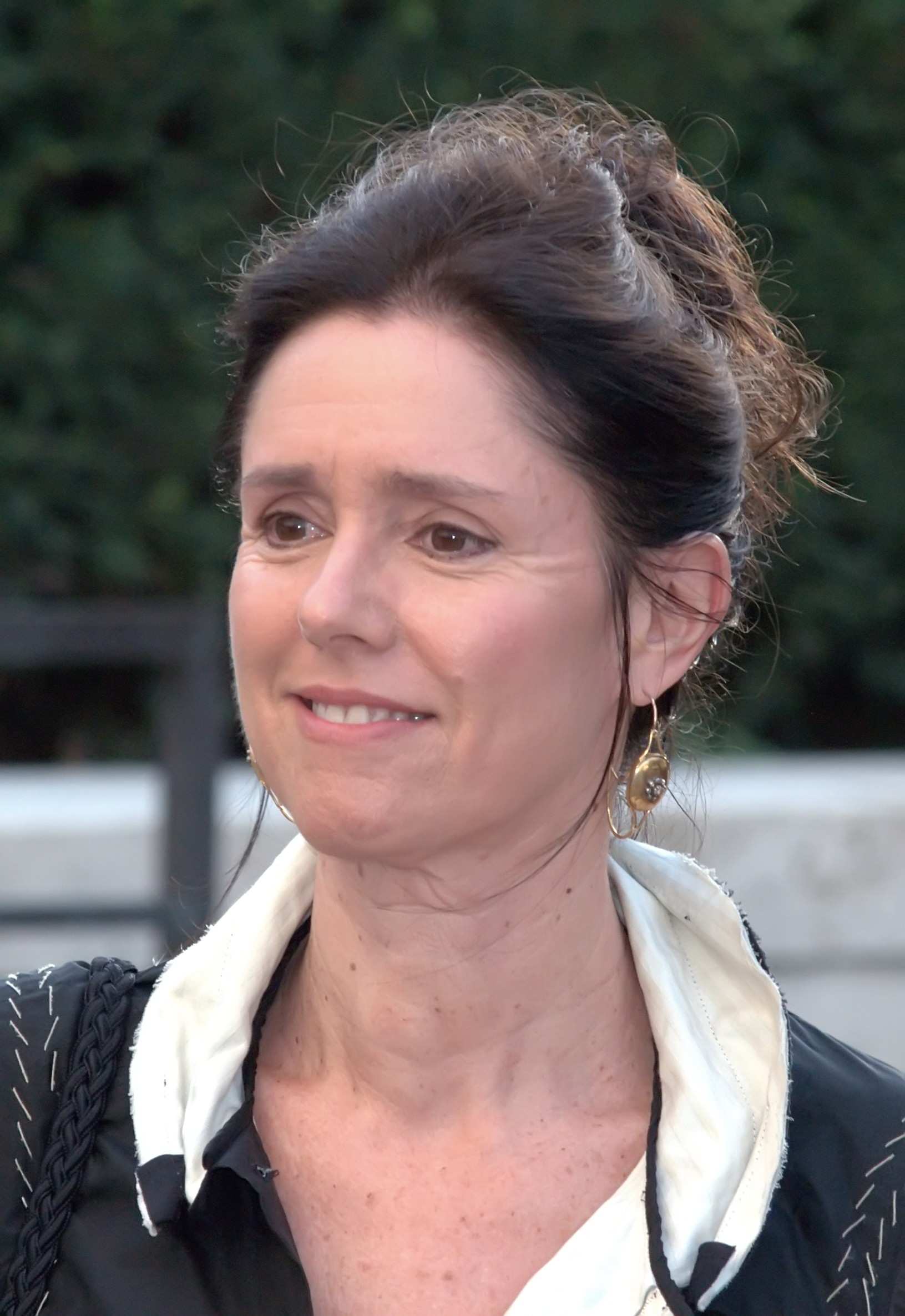
Taymor, Metropolitan Opera 2009

Taymor's first opera direction was of Stravinsky's Oedipus rex, for the Saito Kinen Orchestra in Japan, under the baton of Seiji Ozawa in 1992. The opera featured Philip Langridge as Oedipus and Jessye Norman as Jocasta. Taymor went on to direct the film adaptation of the opera Oedipus Rex.

She went on to direct Wagner's The Flying Dutchman for the Los Angeles Opera in a co-production with the Houston Grand Opera.

She directed Richard Strauss' Salome for the Kirov Opera in Russia, Germany, and Israel, conducted by Valery Gergiev. Taymor's first direction of The Magic Flute (Die Zauberflöte) was for the Maggio Musicale Fiorentino in Florence, with Zubin Mehta conducting in 1993. Over a decade later, Taymor premiered The Magic Flute at the Metropolitan Opera in 2004. The show is now in repertoire there. A newly translated and abridged English version of the opera premiered at the Met in December 2006, and inaugurated a new series on PBS in 2010 entitled, Great Performances at the Met as well as launched the Metropolitan Opera Live in HD series of movie-theater transmissions.

In June 2006, Taymor directed the premiere of Elliot Goldenthal's opera Grendel for the Los Angeles Opera, starring Eric Owens, which was also presented as part of the Summer 2006 Lincoln Center Festival in New York City. A darkly comic retelling of the Beowulf tale based on the novel by John Gardner, the opera was co-commissioned by the Los Angeles Opera and the Lincoln Center Festival. The opera was a finalist for the Pulitzer Prize for Music in 2007.

For the Metropolitan Opera 2005/06 season, Taymor directed a successful production of The Magic Flute. It was revised for the 2006/07 season and, in addition to full-length performances, was adapted for a 100-minute version over the holiday season to appeal to children. That version of the opera was the first of a series of NCM Fathom Live on the Big Screen presentations of MET operas downloaded via satellite to movie theaters across North America and parts of Europe for the 2006/07 season. In 2012, Opera Australia produced this version with locally built scenery and props at the Sydney Opera House, the Arts Centre Melbourne, and the Queensland Performing Arts Centre in Brisbane.

=== Books ===
- The Lion King: Pride Rock on Broadway, Hyperion Books, 1998, ISBN 9780786863426
- Titus: The Illustrated Screenplay, Newmarket Press, 2000, ISBN 9781557044365
- (with Eileen Blumenthal and Antonio Monda) Julie Taymor: Playing with Fire, Harry N. Abrams, Inc., 2007, ISBN 9780810935174
- (with Salma Hayek) Frida: Bringing Frida Kahlo's Life and Art to Film, Newmarket Press, 2009, ISBN 9781557045409
- The Tempest (screenplay adapted from the play by William Shakespeare), Abrams Books, 2010, ISBN 9780810996557

=== Exhibition ===
A major retrospective of 25 years of Taymor's work, titled 'Playing With Fire' opened in the fall of 1999 at the Wexner Center for the Arts and toured the National Museum of Women in the Arts (Washington D.C.) in 2000 and the Field Museum of Natural History (Chicago) in 2001, and was extended due to popular demand in each venue.

In September 2009, costumes from The Lion King were requested and presented to the Smithsonian National Museum of American History and they are now part of the Smithsonian collection as well as the Victoria and Albert Museum in London.

== Awards and nominations ==
In 1991, Taymor won the prestigious MacArthur Fellowship. In addition, Taymor has received a Guggenheim Fellowship, two Obie Awards, the first Annual Dorothy B. Chandler Award in Theater, the Brandeis Creative Arts Award, and the Golden Plate Award of the American Academy of Achievement. Taymor received a Disney Legend award in 2017 for Theatrical.

=== Film ===
Year	Award	Category	Nominated work	Result	Ref.
2002	Academy Awards	Best Original Song	"Burn It Blue" (from Frida)	Nominated	

Accolades for Taymor's films
Year	Film	Academy Awards		BAFTAs		Golden Globes	
Year	Film	Nominations	Wins	Nominations	Wins	Nominations	Wins
1999	Titus	1					
2002	Frida	6	2	4	1	2	1
2007	Across the Universe	1				1	
2010	Tempest	1					
Total		9	2	4	1	3	1

=== Television ===
Year	Award	Category	Nominated work	Result	Ref.
1993	Primetime Emmy Awards	Outstanding Individual Achievement in Costume Design for a Variety or Music Program	Oedipus Rex	Won	

=== Theatre ===
Year	Category	Nominated work	Result	Ref.
Drama Desk Awards
1996	Outstanding Costume Design	The Green Bird	Nominated	
1996	Outstanding Set Design	The Green Bird	Nominated	
1997	Outstanding Costume Design	Juan Darién: A Carnival Mass	Nominated	
1997	Outstanding Scenic Design of a Musical	Juan Darién: A Carnival Mass	Nominated	
1998	Outstanding Director of a Musical	The Lion King	Won	
1998	Outstanding Costume Design	The Lion King	Won	
1998	Outstanding Puppet Design	The Lion King	Won	
2014	Outstanding Director of a Play	A Midsummer Night's Dream	Nominated	
Tony Awards
1997	Best Direction of a Musical	Juan Darién: A Carnival Mass	Nominated	
1997	Best Scenic Design	Juan Darién: A Carnival Mass	Nominated	
1998	Best Direction of a Musical	The Lion King	Won	
1998	Best Original Score	The Lion King	Nominated	
1998	Best Costume Design	The Lion King	Won	

== Bibliography ==
- Blumenthal, Eileen, and Taymor, Julie. Julie Taymor, Playing with Fire : Theater, Opera, Film, New York: H. N. Abrams, 1995
