= Elliot Goldenthal =

American composer (born 1954)

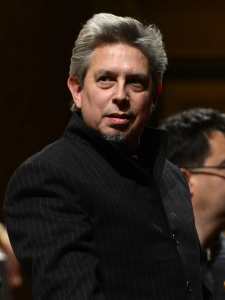
- Goldenthal in 2014

Background information
- Born: May 2, 1954 (age 72); Brooklyn, New York City, U.S.
- Genres: Contemporary classical; theatre music; film score; avant-garde
- Occupations: Composer; songwriter
- Years active: 1978–present
- Website: www.elliotgoldenthal.com

Elliot Goldenthal (born May 2, 1954) is an American composer of contemporary classical music and film and theatrical scores. He studied formally with John Corigliano and was deeply influenced and mentored by Aaron Copland, developing a distinctive style and ability to blend various musical styles and techniques in original and inventive ways. He is known for wide-ranging body of work spanning film, opera, ballet, theater and concert music, including Academy Award for Best Original Score in 2002 for his score to the motion picture Frida, directed by his longtime partner Julie Taymor.

== Early life and education ==
Goldenthal was born on May 2, 1954, the youngest son of a Jewish housepainter father and a Catholic seamstress mother in Brooklyn, New York City, where he was influenced from an early age by music from all cultures and genres. Goldenthal's maternal grandparents immigrated to the United States from Poland. Goldenthal lived in a multi-cultural part of town, and this is reflected in his works. He attended John Dewey High School in Brooklyn where, at the age of 14, he had his very first ballet Variations on Early Glimpses performed; he continued to display his eclectic musical range, performing with rock bands in the seventies.

He then studied music full-time at the prestigious Manhattan School of Music, where he studied with composer John Corigliano (whom he greatly admired), to earn his Bachelor of Music degree (1977) and Master of Music degree (1979) in musical composition.

== Career ==
Goldenthal has written works for concert hall, theater, dance and film. His film highlights include scores for films such as Pet Sematary, Titus, A Time to Kill, Interview with the Vampire, Alien 3, Michael Collins, Batman Forever, Heat and the Academy Award-winning score for Julie Taymor's Frida, a movie in which Goldenthal had a small acting part as a "Newsreel Reporter".

A leading voice in contemporary theater music, Goldenthal has collaborated extensively with Julie Taymor and Andre Șerban on productions ranging from Juan Darién: A Carnival Mass (which earned him a Tony Award nomination, Obie Award, and multiple Drama Desk nominations) to The Green Bird, M. Butterfly, and Grounded. His contributions to American stage have been recognized with the Stephen Sondheim award and the Edinburgh Festival Critics Choice Award.

Goldenthal has established a presence as a composer of classical music through symphonic, vocal, chamber, and operatic works. Highlights include Fire Water Paper, A Vietnam Oratorio, recorded for Sony Classical with Yo-Yo Ma; the Symphony in G-sharp Minor (2014), premiered by the Pacific Symphony under Carl St. Clair, and Symphony No. 3, "Sadowska Poems" (2021), inspired by the writing of Polish poet Barbara Sadowska. His chamber music includes the acclaimed String Quartet No. 1, "The Stone Cutters" (2013), while his opera Grendel, created with director Julie Taymor premiered at the Los Angeles Opera and was a finalist for the 2007 Pulitzer Prize for Music. Through these works, Goldenthal has emerged as a distinctive contemporary composer whose concert music combines symphony ambition with dramatic intensity.

His most significant work for dance is Othello (1997), a full length, three-act ballet commissioned by American Ballet Theatre and San Francisco Ballet and choreographed by Lar Lubovitch. Premiered at the Metropolitan Opera House, the production became a staple of the American Ballet Theatre repertory and was subsequently performed internationally, including engagements by the San Francisco Ballet and the Joffrey Ballet in Chicago. Widely praised for dramatic power and richly orchestrated score, Othello later served as the basis for his Symphony No. 2, "Othello Symphony."

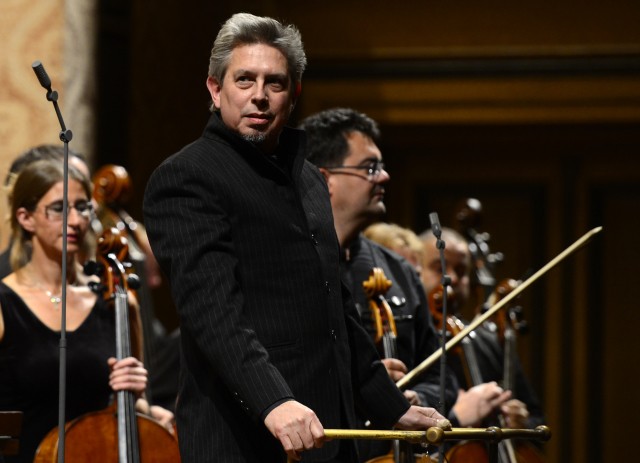
Goldenthal in concert in 2014

Goldenthal cites Japanese composer Tōru Takemitsu as an influence and someone he styles his own career on; Goldenthal has said that the lines between traditional concert music and orchestral film score have become more blurred which is the way he thinks it should be.

== Personal life ==
He lives in New York City "happily unmarried", as he once put it, with his partner Julie Taymor, whom he met in 1980 through a mutual acquaintance, who told him, "I know a person whose work is just as grotesque as yours". They have an office/apartment where they both live and work.

== Style ==
Elliot Goldenthal has been called the "thinking man's composer" by film-music collectors and a generally more cerebral choice for film makers and lovers of film music. He is known for his experimentation, nuances and willingness to try unconventional techniques. He has scored films in almost every genre from horror to action to Shakespeare adaptations. He has not yet scored comedy, but he has composed comedic motifs for several films such as Demolition Man and the Batman series. His eclectic output has gained him a great deal of respect in the music and film communities and with fans. He is widely appreciated for his musical abilities and distinctive style, although some find his work to be too experimental or inaccessible. His action music is brutal and atonal. Sometimes, in underscore, he uses very fast French horn passages with bending tones and whining. Goldenthal has said that he doesn't "hear" atonal and tonal, rather, "I either hear melody or I hear sonority".

Every project we do requires a different approach, but one thing that's always consistent is the framework that Rick provides. In essence, he's giving me all these new instruments to work with. He keeps coming up with surprising combinations of sounds.

— Goldenthal (March 2003), on Richard Martinez

Goldenthal often works with a team he assembled after the soundtrack for Drugstore Cowboy: Teese Gohl as supervising producer, Robert Elhai as orchestrator, Joel Iwataki and Steve McLaughlin as sound engineers and Richard Martinez as electronic music producer. According to Martinez, "a lot of composers want to focus on writing their music, and that's what [his] team allows Elliot to do." At the website filmscoremonthly.com, a former classmate of Goldenthal's commented on an article on the Sphere score from 1998 which stated that when he and Elliot were both studying at the Manhattan School of Music in the '70s, Elliot was already experimenting with unusual techniques. Once, when studying trumpet, Elliot had asked him to "buzz into the wrong end of the mouthpiece and sing into it as well". He thought he was crazy but, looking back after a decade or so of Goldenthal's film and concert music, he "was just way ahead of the rest of us," he said.

== List of works ==
=== Film and television works ===
==== Feature films ====
Year	Title	Director(s)	Studio(s)	Publisher	Notes
1979	Cocaine Cowboys	Ulli Lommel	International Harmony	—N/a	—N/a
1980	Blank Generation	Ulli Lommel	International Harmony	—N/a	Composed with Richard Hell and the Voidoids
1989	Drugstore Cowboy	Gus Van Sant	Avenue Pictures; Artisan Entertainment	Novus	Nominated- Los Angeles Film Critics Association Award for Best Music
1989	Pet Sematary	Mary Lambert	Paramount Pictures	Varèse Sarabande	—N/a
1992	Alien 3	David Fincher	Brandywine Productions; 20th Century Fox	MCA	Expanded soundtrack released by La-La Land Records.
1993	Demolition Man	Marco Brambilla	Silver Pictures; Warner Bros.	Varèse Sarabande	—N/a
1994	Golden Gate	John Madden	The Samuel Goldwyn Company	Varèse Sarabande	—N/a
1994	Interview with the Vampire	Neil Jordan	Geffen Pictures; Warner Bros.	Geffen Records	Nominated- Academy Award for Best Original Score; Nominated- Golden Globe Award for Best Original Score; Nominated- Saturn Award for Best Music
1994	Cobb	Ron Shelton	Regency Enterprises; Warner Bros.	Sony Classical	—N/a
1995	Batman Forever	Joel Schumacher	PolyGram Filmed Entertainment; Warner Bros.	Atlantic	Expanded soundtrack released by La-La Land Records. Nominated- Grammy Award for Best Score Soundtrack for Visual Media
1995	Voices From a Locked Room	Malcolm Clarke	Sony Pictures Classics		
1995	Heat	Michael Mann	Regency Enterprises; Warner Bros.	Warner Bros. Records	Nominated- Chicago Film Critics Association Award for Best Original Score
1996	Michael Collins	Neil Jordan	Geffen Pictures; Warner Bros.	Atlantic	Nominated- Academy Award for Best Original Score; Nominated- Golden Globe Award for Best Original Score; Nominated- Chicago Film Critics Association Award for Best Original Score; Nominated- Los Angeles Film Critics Association Award for Best Music; Satellite Award for Best Original Score
1996	A Time to Kill	Joel Schumacher	Regency Enterprises; Warner Bros.	Atlantic	Nominated- Grammy Award for Best Song Written for Visual Media
1997	The Butcher Boy	Neil Jordan	Geffen Pictures; Warner Bros.	Cinerama Records	Los Angeles Film Critics Association Award for Best Music; Nominated- Chicago Film Critics Association Award for Best Original Score
1997	Batman & Robin	Joel Schumacher	PolyGram Filmed Entertainment; Warner Bros.	—N/a	Score never commercially released.
1998	Sphere	Barry Levinson	Baltimore Pictures; Warner Bros.	Varèse Sarabande	Soundtrack released by Varèse Sarabande.
1999	In Dreams	Neil Jordan	Amblin Entertainment; DreamWorks Pictures	Varèse Sarabande	Performed by the London Metropolitan Orchestra. Soundtrack released by Varèse Sarabande.
1999	Titus	Julie Taymor	OverSeas Filmgroup; Clear Blue Sky Productions; Fox Searchlight Pictures	Sony Classical	Performed by the London Metropolitan Orchestra.
2001	Final Fantasy: The Spirits Within	Hironobu Sakaguchi	Square Pictures; Columbia Pictures	Sony Classical	Performed by the London Symphony Orchestra.
2002	Frida	Julie Taymor	Ventanarosa; Lions Gate Films; Miramax Films	Universal Music	Academy Award for Best Original Score; Golden Globe Award for Best Original Score; Satellite Award for Best Original Score; Nominated- Academy Award for Best Original Song
2002	The Good Thief	Neil Jordan	Alliance Atlantis; Fox Searchlight Pictures	Island Records	Performed by the London Metropolitan Orchestra & the Irish Film Orchestra.
2003	S.W.A.T.	Clark Johnson	Original Film; Columbia Pictures	Varèse Sarabande	—N/a
2007	Across the Universe	Julie Taymor	Revolution Studios; Columbia Pictures	—N/a	Score never commercially released. Nominated- Grammy Award for Best Compilation Soundtrack for Visual Media
2009	Public Enemies	Michael Mann	Relativity Media; Universal Pictures	Decca Records	Nominated- Satellite Award for Best Original Score
2010	The Tempest	Julie Taymor	Touchstone Pictures; Miramax Films	Zarathustra Music	—N/a
2017	Our Souls at Night	Ritesh Batra	Netflix	—N/a	—N/a
2020	The Glorias	Julie Taymor	June Pictures	—N/a	—N/a

==== Television programs ====
Year	Title	Director(s)	Network(s)	Notes
1989	Criminal Justice	Andy Wolk	Home Box Office	Television film
1991	Grand Isle	Mary Lambert	Turner Network Television	Television film
1992	Behind the Scenes	Ellen Hovde; Muffie Meyer	Public Broadcasting Service	10-episode miniseries.
1992	Fool's Fire	Julie Taymor	Public Broadcasting Service	Television film
1994	Roswell	Jeremy Kagan	Showtime	Television film
1996	The West	Stephen Ives	Public Broadcasting Service	Episode: "The Geography of Hope"
2000	Por un beso	Alfredo Gurrola	Televisa	Episode: "Pilot"
2003	Great Performances: Dance in America	Julie Taymor	Public Broadcasting Service	Episode: "Lar Lubovitch's 'Othello'"

=== Concert music works ===
Year	Title	Notes
1974	Three Pieces for Piano	
1977	Requiem Mass	Un-premiered
1979	Sonata for Double Bass and Piano	Recorded by Tim Cobb & Stephen Gosling
1979	Los Heraldos Negros – a song cycle for singer and percussion	Un-premiered
1979	Brass Quintet No. 1	
1979	Jabberwocky for Woodwind Quartet	Set to the poem by Lewis Carroll Also arranged for two bassoons and winds
1980	Brass Quintet No. 2	Recorded by the Extension ensemble
1988	Pastime Variations – A Memorial for Ebbets Field	
1990	Shadow Play Scherzo for Orchestra	
1996	Fire Water Paper: A Vietnam Oratorio	Recorded by Pacific Symphony Orchestra, featuring Yo Yo Ma
2013	String Quartet No. 1 "The Stone Cutters"	Premiered by the FLUX Quartet in 2015
2013	Adagietto Doloroso for orchestra	Premiered at the Ghent Film Music Festival conducted by Dirk Brossé
2014	Symphony in G♯ Minor	
2014	Grand Gothic Suite	
2015	Lyric Suite: The Floods of Avon for String Orchestra and Piano	
2017	Waltz & Agitato "Pravda" for Orchestra	
2017	For Trumpet & Strings (First Movement of "Trumpet Concerto")	Conducted by Dirk Brossé with trumpeter Tine Thing Helseth
2018	Trumpet Concerto	Conducted by Dirk Brossé with trumpeter Tine Thing Helseth
2019	OCTOBER LIGHT: Adagio for Orchestra	Premiered with Pacific Symphony under Carl. St. by Clair December 2019
2021	SYMPHONY NO.3 for Soprano and Orchestra Poems by Barbara Sadowska	Premiered by soprano Adriana Ferfecka, the Beethoven Academy Orchestra and conductor Monika Stefaniak at the Krakow Filharmonia, 15 December 2021

=== Theatre works ===
Year	Title	Type	Notes
1984	The King Stag	Play	
1985	Liberty's Taken	Musical	Composed with David Suehsdorf and Julie Taymor
1986	The Transposed Heads	Musical	Adapted by Sidney Goldfarb and Julie Taymor
1988	The Serpent Woman	Play	
1988	Juan Darién: A Carnival Mass	Musical	Reworked and recorded in 1996
1997	Othello	Ballet	Choreography by Lar Lubovitch
1999	The Green Bird	Musical	
2006	Grendel	Opera	Libretto by Julie Taymor & J. D. McClatchy
2013	A Midsummer Night's Dream	Play	Production at the Polansky Theater
2015	Grounded	Play	Premiered at The Public Theater
2017	M. Butterfly	Play	

=== Other appearances ===
Year	Title	Role	Notes
2017	Unearthed & Untold: The Path to Pet Sematary	Himself	Documentary film

== Awards and nominations ==
- (2007) Pulitzer Prize for Music Nomination for his acclaimed "Grendel" opera
- (2004) Emmy Awards Nomination, "Great Performances: Dance in America" – Outstanding Music Composition for a Miniseries, Movie or a Special (Dramatic Underscore)
- (2004) ASCAP Film and Television Music Awards Win, "S.W.A.T." – Top Box Office Film Score
- (2003) World Soundtrack Awards 2003 Win, "Frida" – Best Original Soundtrack of the Year
- (2003) World Soundtrack Awards 2003 Win, "Frida" – Soundtrack Composer of the Year
- (2003) World Soundtrack Awards 2003 Nomination', "Burn It Blue" from "Frida" – Best Original Song Written for a Film
- (2002) Academy Awards Win, "Frida" – Best Original Score
- (2002) Academy Awards Nomination, "Frida", "Burn It Blue" – Best Original Song
- (2002) Golden Globes Win, "Frida" – Best Original Score
- (2002) World Soundtrack Awards 2002 Nomination, "The Dream Within" from "Final Fantasy: The Sprits Within" – Best Original Song Written for a Film
- (1999) Chicago Film Critics Association awards Nomination, "The Butcher Boy" – Best Original Score
- (1998) ASCAP awards Win, "Batman & Robin" – Top Box Office Film Score
- (1998) Chicago Film Critics Awards Nomination, "The Butcher Boy" – Best Original Score
- (1998) Los Angeles Film Critics Association Awards 1998 Win, "The Butcher Boy" – Best Original Score
- (1997) Tony Awards Nomination, "Juan Darien: A Carnival Mass" (Broadway Production) – Best Original Musical Score
- (1997) ASCAP awards Win, "A Time to Kill" – Top Box Office Film Score
- (1997) Grammy Nomination, "Defile and Lament" from "A Time to Kill"
- (1996) Academy Awards Nomination, "Michael Collins" – Best Original Score
- (1996) Golden Globe Nomination, "Michael Collins" – Best Original Score
- (1996) ASCAP awards Win, "Batman Forever" – Top Box Office Film Score
- (1995) Grammy Nomination, "Batman Forever" – Best Instrumental Composition
- (1995) ASCAP awards Win, "Interview with the Vampire" – Top Box Office Film Score
- (1995) Golden Globe Nomination, "Interview with the Vampire" – Best Original Score
- (1994) Academy Awards Nomination, "Interview with the Vampire" – Best Original Score
- (1994) ASCAP awards Win, "Demolition Man" – Top Box Office Film Score
- (1990) Edinburgh Festival Critics Choice Award Win, "Juan Darien: A Carnival Mass" – Best Music
- (1990) American Academy of Arts and Letters Richard Rodgers Award Win, "Juan Darien: A Carnival Mass" – Best Music
- (1988) Obie Award Win, "Juan Darien: A Carnival Mass" (Original Production) – Best Music

Among others including the Arturo Toscanini Award, the New Music for Young Ensembles composition prize, the Stephen Sondheim Award in Music Theater and a New York Foundation for the Arts fellowship.

== See also ==
- Avant-garde
- Modernism (music)
