= John Conklin =

American theater designer and dramaturg (1937–2025)

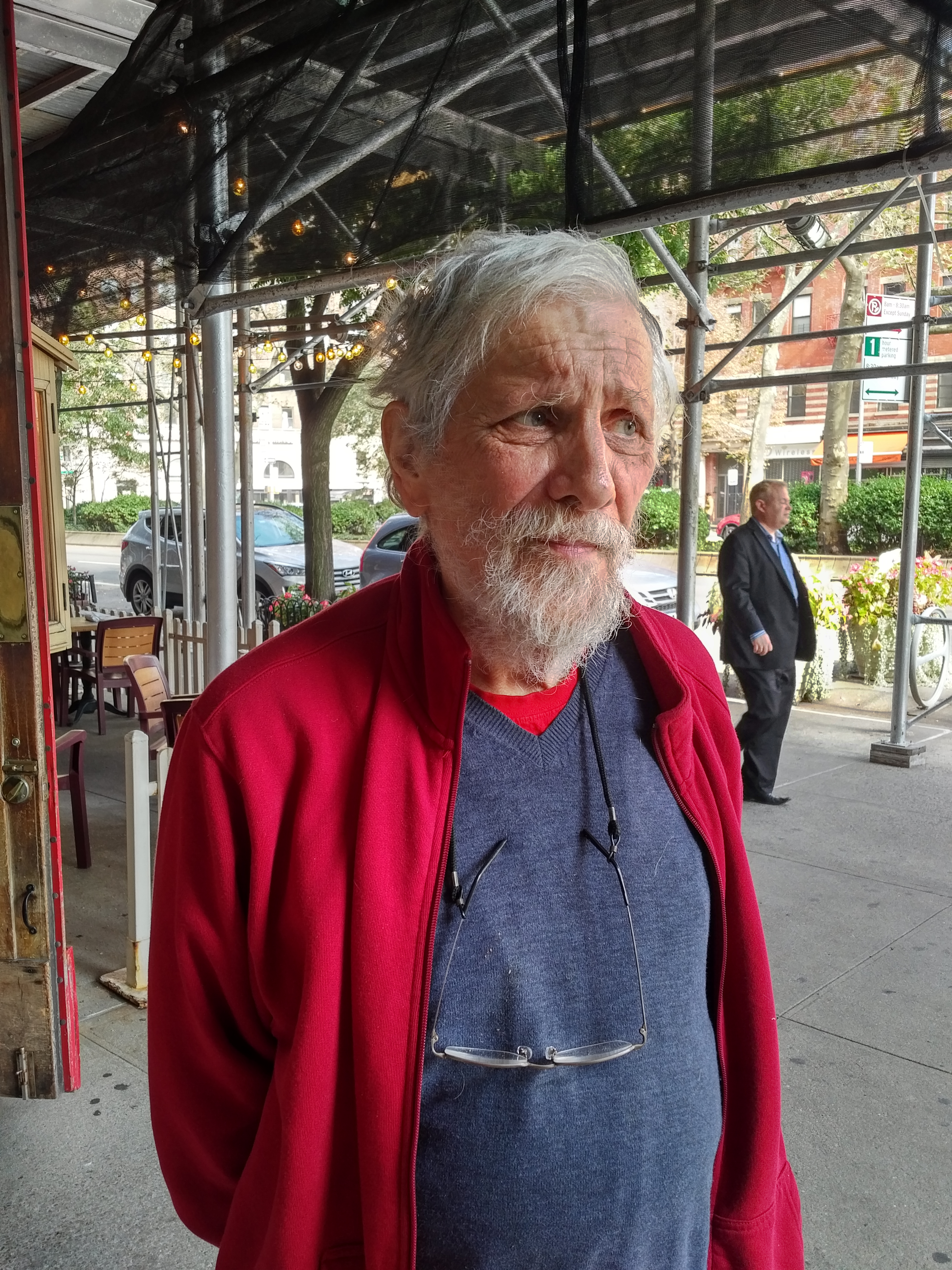
John Conklin in 2016

John Conklin (June 22, 1937 – June 24, 2025) was an American international theater designer, dramaturg, and taught in the Department of Design for Stage and Film at New York University's Tisch School of the Arts.

== Life and career ==
John Conklin was born in Hartford, Connecticut, and educated at the Kingswood-Oxford School and Yale University.

He made his professional debut in 1958 at Williamstown Theatre Festival, where he designed more than 30 shows. A 1966 production of Dialogues of the Carmelites for New York City Opera was his first opportunity to work in an artform that had captivated him since childhood. He designed two complete Ring Cycles (for San Francisco Opera and Lyric Opera of Chicago) and a number of productions at The Metropolitan Opera, including the world premiere of The Ghosts of Versailles.

In addition to his design at Metropolitan Opera and the New York City Opera; in NYC John also designed for the New York Shakespeare Festival; Broadway and off-Broadway productions. He received a Tony Award nomination (in 1974) for set design of The Au Pair Man at Circle in the Square Theatre. He received the Robert L.B. Tobin Award for Lifetime Achievement in Theatrical Design from the Theatre Development Fund (2008).

He designed for many other U.S. opera companies, including the San Francisco Opera and the Chicago Lyric Opera; Glimmerglass Opera; Opera Theatre of St. Louis; Santa Fe Opera; Seattle Opera; and the opera companies of Houston, Dallas, San Diego, Washington, and Boston. Regional theaters where he worked include the American Repertory Theatre, the Goodman Theatre (Chicago), the Long Wharf Theatre, Hartford Stage, Arena Stage, the Guthrie Theatre, Center Stage (Baltimore), and Actors Theatre of Louisville.

In Europe, he designed for the English National Opera, the Royal Opera, Stockholm and the opera companies of Munich, Amsterdam, and Bologna. In 1991, he designed the costumes for Robert Wilson's production of the Magic Flute at the Bastille Opera in Paris.

In 2008, he retired from his position as Associate Artistic Director for the Glimmerglass Opera, a post he had held for eighteen years. Beginning in 2009 and until his death, he was the artistic advisor for Boston Lyric Opera where his design work included Lucia de Lammermoor (2005) and Brittens's A Midsummer Night's Dream (2011). Reviewing the latter production, the Boston Globe described the scenery as "by turns abstract, stylized, whimsical, and deconstructed."

At BLO, he also worked to develop new supplemental performances, lecture series, and community events. Conklin was on the faculty of the Tisch School of the Arts at New York University where he taught courses in design for stage and film.

Conklin died in Cooperstown, NY on June 24, 2025, at the age of 88.

== Work at Glimmerglass Opera ==
Conklin made his Glimmerglass debut shortly after Glimmerglass moved from a high school auditorium to a purpose-built opera house, with productions of Fidelio (directed by Jonathan Miller) and Il re pastore (directed by Mark Lamos). In the years that followed, John worked closely with General Director Paul Kellogg to meet the challenge — and opportunity — of the new theater and the international attention it garnered. When Kellogg was tapped to lead New York City Opera, he named Conklin Director of Productions at both companies, formalizing Conklin’s role as a key advisor. All told, Conklin designed scenery and/or costumes for more than 40 Glimmerglass productions. (A complete list of Glimmerglass productions and collaborators is below.) He also took great delight in designing the company float for the annual Springfield Fourth of July Parade, as well as devising a series of sprawling seminars and smaller-scale entertainments for a variety of venues. As his role evolved, so did his title, to Assistant Artistic Director (2000), then Associate Artistic Director (2003).

When Conklin retired from his formal role at Glimmerglass in 2008, a group of friends and collaborators established the John Conklin Production Internship Fund to honor and continue his legacy. James Rotondo, the 2017 John Conklin Scenic Intern, subsequently returned to Glimmerglass to design four youth operas and two mainstage shows, including last year’s Pagliacci. In 2025, he joined Conklin as Associate Scenic Designer for all four shows of the 2025 Festival: Tosca, Sunday in the Park with George, The House on Mango Street, and The Rake’s Progress.

== Full list of work at Glimmerglass Opera & Collaborators, 1991-2025 ==
1991: Il re pastore — conductor Ransom Wilson, director Mark Lamos, sets and costumes John Conklin, lighting Robert Wierzel

1991: Fidelio — conductor Stewart Robertson, director Jonathan Miller, sets and costumes John Conklin, lighting Robert Wierzel

1992: The Secret Marriage — conductor Stewart Robertson, director Jonathan Miller, sets and costumes John Conklin, lighting Robert Wierzel

1992: The Turn of the Screw — conductor Stewart Robertson, director Mark Lamos, sets and costumes John Conklin, lighting Robert Wierzel

1993: Le comte Ory — conductor Daniel Beckwith, director Keith Warner, sets and costumes John Conklin, lighting Robert Wierzel

1993: Werther — conductor Stewart Robertson, director Mark Lamos, sets and costumes John Conklin, lighting Robert Wierzel

1994: L'incoronazione di Poppea — conductor Jane Glover, director Jonathan Miller, sets John Conklin, costumes Judy Levin, lighting Robert Wierzel

1994: Ariadne in Naxos — conductor Stewart Robertson, director Mark Lamos, sets John Conklin, costumes Catherine Zuber, lighting Robert Wierzel

1995: Tamerlano — conductor Jane Glover, director Jonathan Miller, sets John Conklin, costumes Judy Levin, lighting Robert Wierzel

1995: Don Giovanni — conductor Stewart Robertson, director Peter Stormare, sets John Conklin, costumes Judy Levin, lighting Robert Wierzel

1996: La Calisto — conductor Jane Glover, director Simon Callow, sets John Conklin, costumes Gabriel Berry, lighting Mark McCullough

1996: Lizzie Borden — conductor Stewart Robertson, director Rhoda Levine, sets John Conklin, costumes Constance Hoffmann, lighting Robert Wierzel

1997: L'italiana in Algeri — conductor George Manahan, director Christopher Alden, sets Carol Bailey/John Conklin, costumes Gabriel Berry, lighting Mark McCullough

1997: Of Mice and Men — conductor Stewart Robertson, director Rhoda Levine, sets John Conklin, costumes Jess Goldstein, lighting Robert Wierzel

1998: Partenope — conductor Harry Bicket, director Francisco Negrin, sets John Conklin, costumes Paul Steinberg, lighting Robert Wierzel

1998: Falstaff — conductor George Manahan, director Leon Major, sets and costumes John Conklin, lighting Pat Collins

1999: The Abduction from the Seraglio — conductor Stewart Robertson, director Irene Lewis, sets John Conklin, costumes Constance Hoffmann, lighting Pat Collins

1999: Rigoletto — conductor George Manahan, director Rhoda Levine, sets John Conklin, costumes Tracy Dorman, lighting Robert Wierzel

2000: The Glass Blowers — conductor John DeMain, director Christopher Alden, sets John Conklin, costumes Gabriel Berry, lighting Mark McCullough

2001: Agrippina — conductor Harry Bicket, director Lillian Groag, sets John Conklin, costumes Jess Goldstein, lighting Mark McCullough

2002: Orlando paladino — conductor Guido Johannes Rumstadt, director James Robinson, sets John Conklin, costumes Martin Pakledinaz, lighting Mimi Jordan Sherin

2002: Pagliacci and Cavalleria rusticana double bill — conductor Stewart Robertson, director Robin Guarino, sets John Conklin, costumes Gabriel Berry, lighting John Lasiter

2003: Bluebeard — conductor Gerald Steichen, director Christopher Alden, sets John Conklin, costumes Kaye Voyce, lighting Mark McCullough

2003: The Good Soldier Schweik — conductor Stewart Robertson, director Rhoda Levine, sets and costumes John Conklin, lighting Robert Wierzel

2004: La fanciulla del West — conductor Stewart Robertson, director Lillian Groag, sets John Conklin, costumes Constance Hoffmann, lighting Robert Wierzel

2004: The Mines of Sulphur (American professionally-staged premiere) — conductor Stewart Robertson, director David Schweizer, sets James Noone, costumes John Conklin, lighting Kevin Adams

2005: Lucia di Lammermoor — conductor Beatrice Jona Affron, director Lillian Groag, sets John Conklin, costumes Catherine Zuber, lighting Christopher Akerlind

2006: The Barber of Seville — conductor David Angus, director Leon Major, sets John Conklin, costumes David Roberts, lighting Jeff Harris

2006: The Pirates of Penzance — conductor Stewart Robertson, director Lillian Groag, sets John Conklin, costumes Jess Goldstein, lighting Pat Collins

2007: Orphée et Eurydice — conductor Julian Wachner, director Lillian Groag, sets John Conklin, costumes Constance Hoffmann, lighting Robert Wierzel

2008: Giulio Cesare in Egitto — conductor David Stern, director Robin Guarino, sets John Conklin, costumes Gabriel Berry, lighting Robert Wierzel

2008: I Capuleti e i Montecchi — conductor David Angus, director Anne Bogart, sets John Conklin, costumes James Schuette, lighting Christopher Akerlind

2008: Das Liebesverbot (American professionally-staged premiere) — conductor Corrado Rovaris, director Nicholas Muni, sets John Conklin, costumes Kaye Voyce, lighting Mark McCullough

2008: Kiss Me, Kate — conductor David Charles Abell, director Diane Paulus, sets John Conklin, costumes Anka Lupes, lighting Jane Cox

2015: Catone in Utica — conductor Ryan Brown, director Tazewell Thompson, sets John Conklin, costumes Sara Jean Tosetti, lighting Robert Wierzel

2017: Xerxes — conductor Nicole Paiement, director Tazewell Thompson, sets John Conklin, costumes Sara Jean Tosetti, lighting Robert Wierzel

2018: The Barber of Seville — conductor Joseph Colaneri, director Francesca Zambello, sets John Conklin, costumes Lynly Saunders, lighting Robert Wierzel

2025: Tosca — conductor Joseph Colaneri, director Louisa Proske, sets John Conklin, costumes Kaye Voyce, lighting Robert Wierzel

2025: Sunday in the Park with George — conductor Michael Ellis Ingram, director Ethan Heard, sets John Conklin, costumes Beth Goldenberg, lighting Amith Chandrashaker

2025: The House on Mango Street (world premiere) — composer Derek Bermel) conductor Nicole Paiement, director Chía Patiño, sets John Conklin, costumes Erik Teague, lighting Amith Chandrashaker

2025: The Rake's Progress — conductor Joseph Colaneri, director Eric Sean Fogel, sets John Conklin, costumes Lynly Saunders, lighting Robert Wierzel
