= Mark McCullough (lighting designer) =

American lighting designer (1963–2025)

Mark McCullough (September 13, 1963 – December 31, 2025) was an American lighting designer. A native of North Carolina, McCullough was educated at the North Carolina School of the Arts and the Yale School of Drama. After graduating from Yale in 1991 he had an active career as a lighting designer for opera and theatre productions both in the United States and in Europe. He designed lighting for both Broadway and the West End productions, and had lengthy associations as a designer with the Glimmerglass Festival, the New York City Opera, and the San Francisco Opera. Other organizations he worked for included the Metropolitan Opera, the Lyric Opera of Chicago, the Houston Grand Opera, the Royal Opera, London, and Royal Shakespeare Company among many others.

== Education ==
The son of Richard and Sally McCullough, Mark Lamons McCullough was born in Mecklenburg, North Carolina on September 13, 1963. He grew up in Charlotte, North Carolina. His father worked for the Marsh & McLennan; ultimately retiring as a vice president with that company. Mark was educated at Charlotte Country Day School in his youth. In 1983 he graduated from the North Carolina School of the Arts (NCSA) with a high school diploma. He continued to study in the university division of the NCSA where he earned a BFA in design and production in 1986. His senior year he designed the lighting for NCSA's Spring 1986 productions of the ballet Carmina Burana and a dance work titled Rossi Sonatas.

McCullough interned as an assistant to the lighting designer at BalletMet in Columbus, Ohio following his graduation from the NCSA. He then pursued graduate studies in stage design at the Yale School of Drama where he earned a Master of Fine Arts in 1991. While a student at Yale he designed lighting for Yale Repertory Theatre productions of George Bernard Shaw's Pygmalion (1990), Václav Havel's Largo desolato (1990), and Elvira DiPaolo's Bricklayers (1991).

== Early career and Glimmerglass Festival ==
In 1992 McCullough was the lighting designer for drag artist John Epperson's off-Broadway show Lypsinka! A Day in the Life at the New York Theatre Workshop. That same year he designed lights for Austin Hartel and Lisa Dalton's Dalton-Hartel Dance for performances at the Mulberry Street Theater in New York City; and was the light designer for INTAR Theatre's production of Ramón del Valle-Inclán's Words Divine: A Miracle Play (English translation of Divinas palabras). He designed further productions for Dalton-Hartel Dance which were staged at the Hudson Guild Theater in 1993. He returned to INTAR in 1996 to design lights for the company's world premiere staging of Kenneth Lonergan's This Is Our Youth; a work he designed for again at the McGinn Cazale Theater in 1998.

In 1995 McCullough designed the lights for Gilbert and Sullivan's Yeomen of the Guard at the Glimmerglass Festival (GF); a production which was also staged at the Welsh National Opera. He went on to design lighting for more than 30 productions for the GF; including the 2011 world premiere of Jeanine Tesori and Tony Kushner's opera A Blizzard on Marblehead Neck. Other designs he did for the GF included productions of Gaetano Donizetti's Don Pasquale (1996), Francesco Cavalli's La Calisto (1996), Virgil Thomson's The Mother of Us All (1998), John Philip Sousa's The Glass Blowers (2000), George Frideric Handel's Agrippina (2001), Claudio Monteverdi's L'Orfeo (2001), Richard Wagner's Das Liebesverbot (2008), Wagner's The Flying Dutchman (2013), Rodgers and Hammerstein's Carousel (2014), and Leonard Bernstein's Candide (2015).

In 1996 McCullough designed for the New Zealand Festival of the Arts's production of Leoš Janáček's Káťa Kabanová, and Hartford Stage's production of Under Milk Wood. In 1997 he was the light designer for the original Off-Broadway production of Paula Vogel's How I Learned to Drive which was staged at the Vineyard Theatre, and designed for the Chichester Festival Theatre's production of Ivan Turgenev's Fortune's Fool.

McCullough designed lights for a production of Albert Innaurato's Gemini at the Second Stage Theater in 1999. That same year he was a designer for the New York Shakespeare Festival's production of Tartuffe at the Delacorte Theater in Central Park. In 2000 he returned to the Vineyard Theatre to design for Craig Lucas's Stranger which starred Kyra Sedgwick, David Strathairn, and David Harbour. That same year he designed lights for a production of Wendy Wasserstein’s Old Money at the Mitzi E. Newhouse Theater in Lincoln Center.

In 1998 McCullough made his first designs for the Metropolitan Opera for their new production of Mozart's The Marriage of Figaro which starred Bryn Terfel in the title role, Cecilia Bartoli as Susanna, Renée Fleming as the Countess, and Dwayne Croft as the Count. The production was filmed for television broadcast on PBS's The Metropolitan Opera Presents, and aired on national television in 1999.

== Broadway and other plays and musicals ==
On Broadway McCullough first designed lights for the 2000 revival of Andrew Lloyd Webber's Jesus Christ Superstar at the Longacre Theatre; a production which had earlier toured the United Kingdom in 1999. The show subsequently toured the United States after running on Broadway. His subsequent Broadway credits included lighting designs for After Miss Julie (2009, Roundabout Theatre Company), The American Plan (2009, Samuel J. Friedman Theatre), Outside Mullingar (2014, Samuel J. Friedman Theatre), and How I Learned to Drive (2022, Samuel J. Friedman Theatre).

McCullough's Off-Broadway design credits include Lonergan's Lobby Hero (2001, Playwrights Horizons) Wendy MacLeod's Juvenilia (2003, Playwrights Horizons), Paula Vogel's The Long Christmas Ride Home (2003, Vineyard Theatre), Vogel's The Baltimore Waltz (2004, Signature Theatre Company), Jean-Claude Carrière's The Controversy of Valladolid (2005, The Public Theater), Kevin Elyot's Mouth to Mouth (2008, Acorn Theatre), and Julia Cho's The Language Archive (2010, Laura Pels Theatre). His work in regional theater included La Jolla Playhouse (2000, The School for Scandal); Hyperion Theater (2003, Disney's Aladdin: A Musical Spectacular); Shakespeare Theatre Company (2007, Edward II; 2008, Antony and Cleopatra; 2009, Design for Living); and the Long Wharf (2007, Man of La Mancha). He also designed for the Mark Taper Forum; Steppenwolf Theatre Company and Center Stage (Atlanta), among others.

In London's West End, was the lighting designer for Andrew Lloyd Webber's Whistle Down the Wind which ran at the Aldwych Theatre in 1998. He also designed for the Royal Shakespeare Company's production of Friedrich Schiller's Don Carlos which was staged in 1999-2000 at The Other Place. He also designed lighting for the RSC's production of John Webster's The White Devil.

== Further work in opera ==
In 1999 McCullough designed the lights for the first production of Richard Strauss's Intermezzo to be produced in New York for the New York City Opera (NYCO). Other NYCO productions he designed for included Falstaff (1996), L'italiana in Algeri (1997, co-production with Glimmerglass), Don Pasquale (1997), Il viaggio a Reims (1999) The Mother of Us All (2000) Il ritorno d'Ulisse in patria (2001, co-production with Glimmerglass) Agrippina (2002), The Glass Blowers (2002, co-production with Glimmerglass) and Alcina (2003).

In 2001 McCullough designed the lights for the world premiere of Tigran Chukhajian's Arshak II at the San Francisco Opera (SFO). He later was the light designer for the SFO's staging of Richard Wagner's Ring Cycle directed by Francesca Zambello; including performances of Das Rheingold (2008, 2011, and 2018), Die Walküre (2010, 2011, and 2018), Siegfried (2011 and 2018), and Götterdämmerung (2011 and 2018). Other SFO production he designed for included Luisa Miller (2000), Roméo et Juliette (2001), Rigoletto (2001, revived in 2006 and 2025), The Mother of Us All (2003), Porgy and Bess (2009), La traviata (2009), Show Boat (2014), and Aida (2016). Other world premieres he designed for at the SFO included Christopher Theofanidis's Heart of a Soldier (2011) and Marco Tutino Two Women (2015).

McCullough designed the lights for the world premiere of Tobias Picker's opera Thérèse Raquin which was first given at the Dallas Opera in 2001 and was subsequently performed at the Opéra de Montréal and the San Diego Opera. He had earlier designed the lights for San Diego's 1999 production of Mozart's Così fan tutte He later returned to Dallas to design the lights for Roberto Devereux (2009).

In 2006 McCullough was awarded the Joseph Jefferson Award for Lighting Design for Man of La Mancha at the Court Theatre in Chicago, Illinois. He designed the lights for the Lyric Opera of Chicago's 2012 production of Show Boat; a production also performed by the Houston Grand Opera (2013), and the Washington National Opera (2013). In 2007 he designed the lights for the world premiere of David Carlson's Anna Karenina at the Florida Grand Opera.

McCullough designed lighting for the 2018 Seattle Opera production of Porgy and Bess which starred Angel Blue.

=== Opera ===
- Washington National Opera (Fidelio (2003) and Die Walküre (2003 and 2007), Porgy and Bess (2005; revived 2010), Das Rheingold (2006), Rigoletto (2008), Siegfried (2009), Salome (2010), Hamlet (2010), Don Pasquale (2011), Nabucco (2012), Anna Bolena (2012), and Show Boat (2013).
- Los Angeles Opera (Porgy and Bess (2007), Lohengrin (2010), Rigoletto (2010), Florencia en el Amazonas (2014), Nabucco (2017), Candide (2018), and Aida (2022)
- Boston Lyric Opera (Don Carlos, Aida, Madama Butterfly, Tosca)
- Royal Opera House (2001, Queen of Spades)
- Opera national du Rhin (The Beggar’s Opera by Benjamin Britten)
- Opera North (Eugene Onegin)
- Bard College (The Nose)
- Virginia Opera (2006, Susannah; 2007, The Tales of Hoffmann; 2008, Eugene Onegin; 2010, Don Giovanni)

== Personal life and death ==
In 1992 McCullough married Theresa Marie Carney, a dancer with the Paul Taylor Dance Company.

McCullough lived in Charlottesville, Virginia since 2005. He died of glioblastoma on December 31, 2025.
