= Abravanel Hall =

Concert hall in Salt Lake City, Utah

Coordinates: 40°46′8″N 111°53′43″W

Maurice Abravanel Hall
- Abravanel Hall
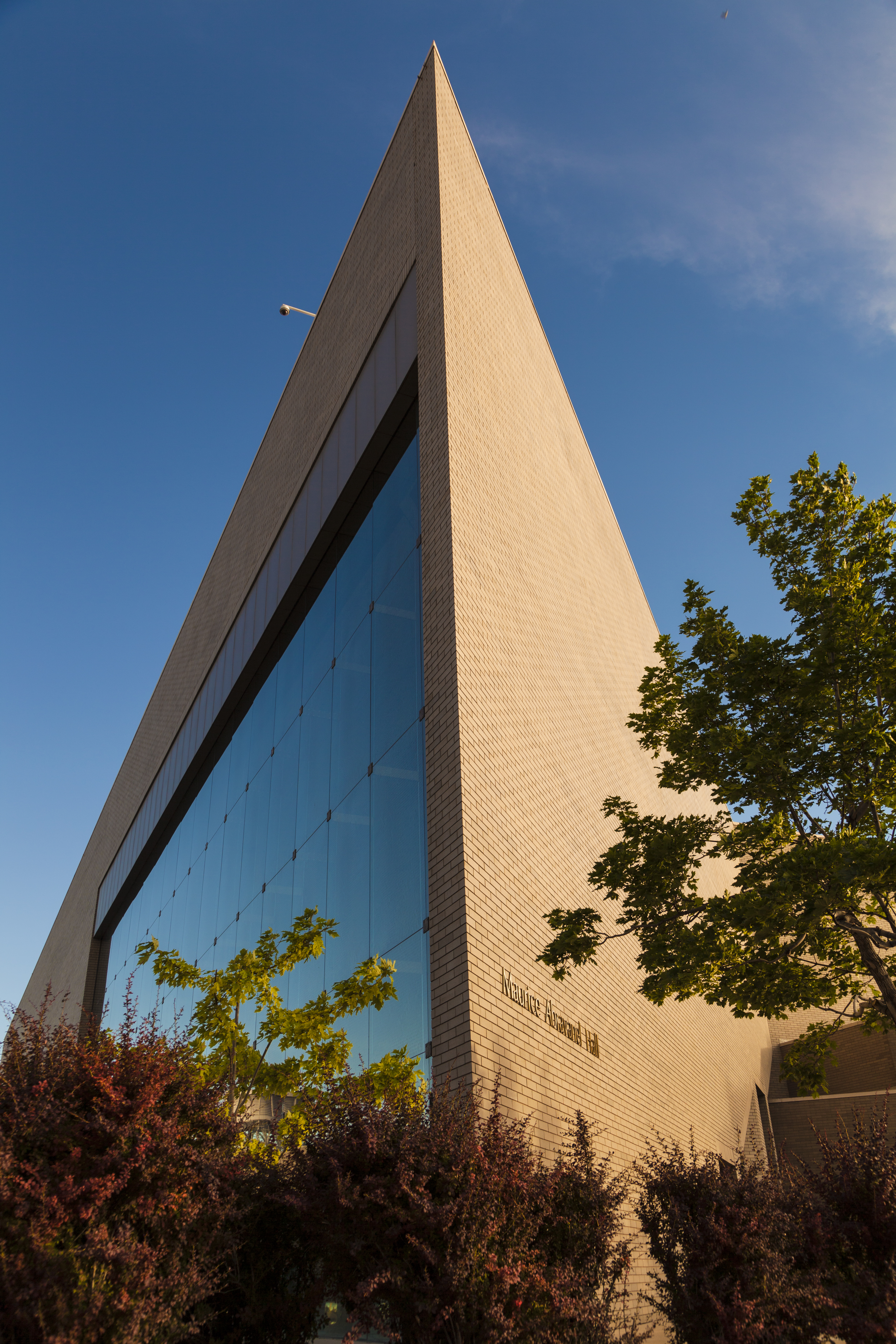
- Interactive map of Maurice Abravanel Hall
- Former names: Symphony Hall (1979–1993)
- Location: 123 W. South Temple; Salt Lake City, Utah
- Owner: Salt Lake County
- Seating type: Reserved
- Capacity: 2,768
- Type: Concert hall

Construction
- Built: 1976-1979
- Opened: 1979

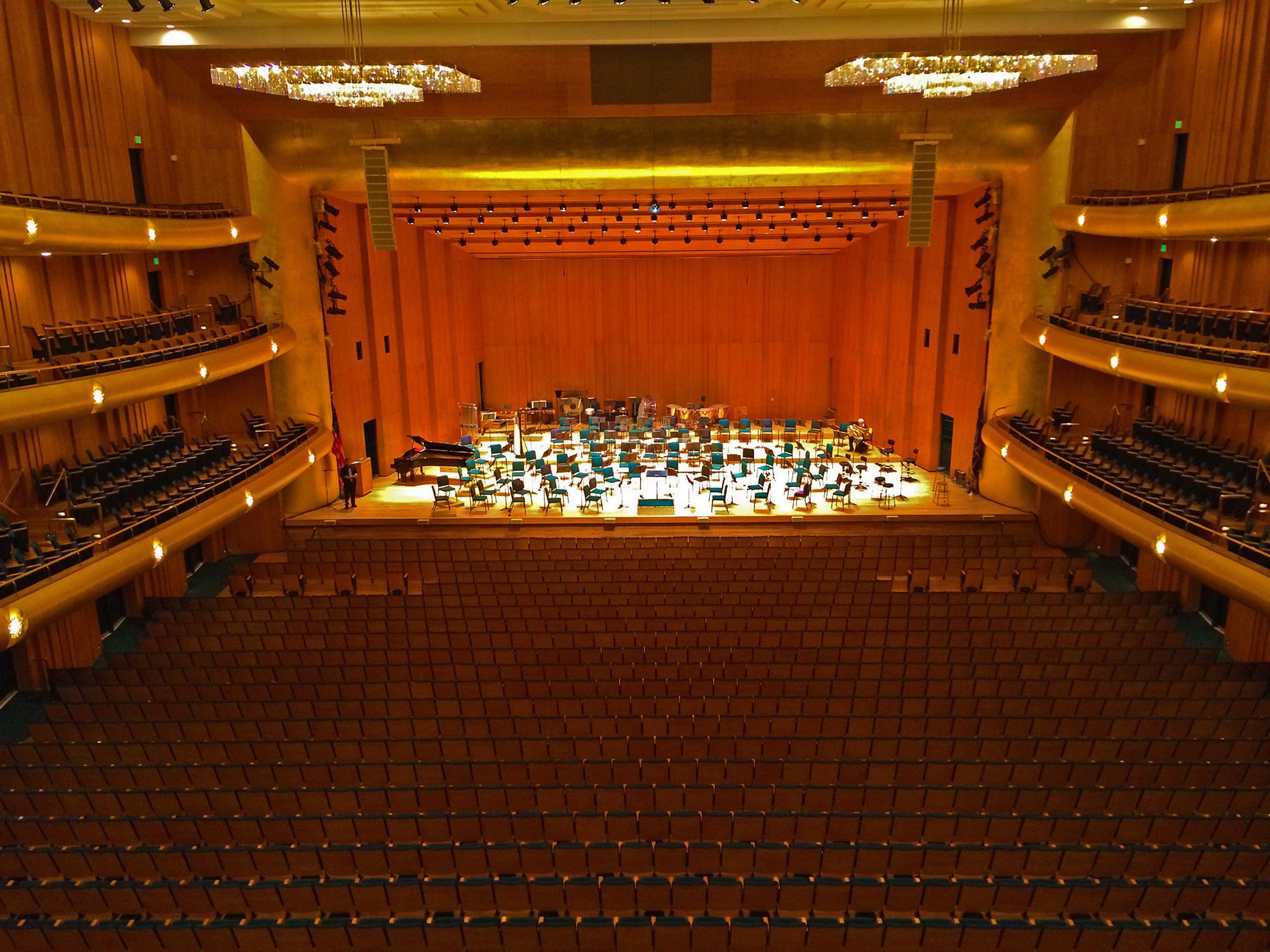
Abravanel Hall auditorium

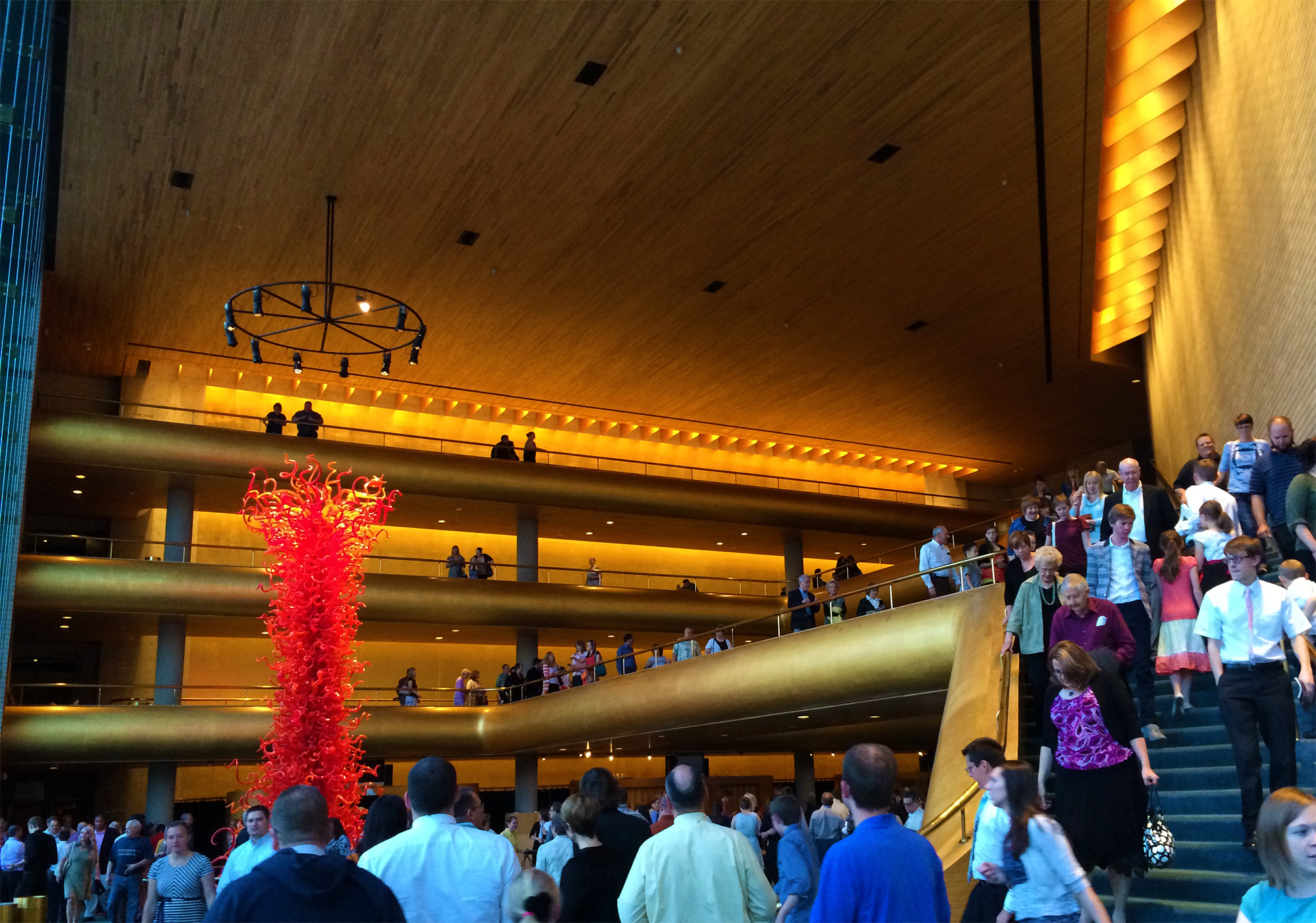
Abravanel Hall lobby

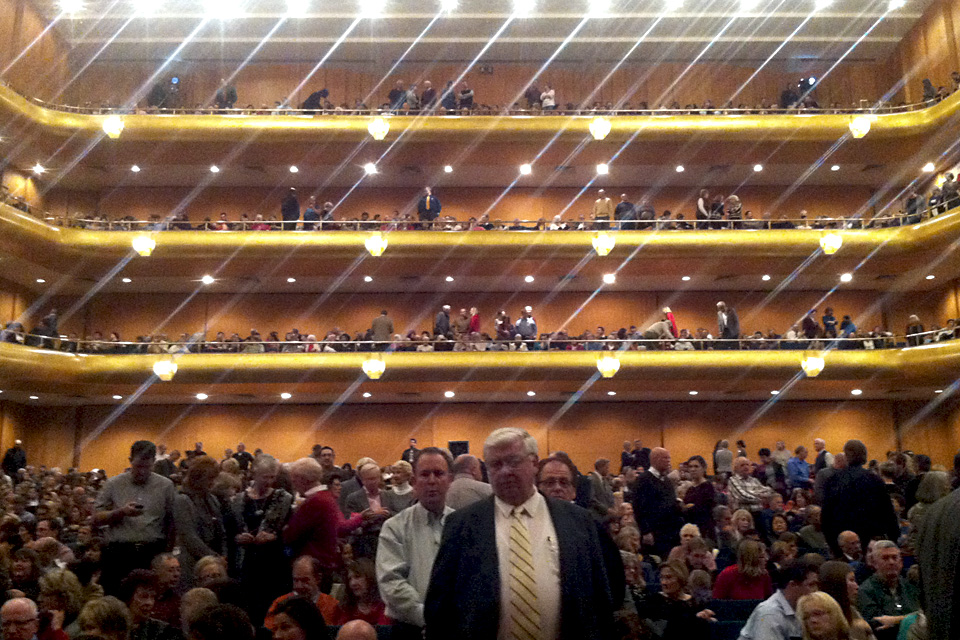
Abravanel Hall interior

Abravanel Hall is a concert hall in Salt Lake City, Utah that is home to the Utah Symphony, and is part of the Salt Lake County Arts and Culture. The hall is an architectural landmark in the city, and is adjacent to Temple Square and the Salt Palace on South Temple Street. The hall can hold up to 2,811 occupants. It was listed on the National Register of Historic Places in 2024.

== History ==
The Board of the Utah Symphony created a Design and Construction Committee which included Maurice Abravanel, O.C. Tanner, and Jack Gallivan, to advise the architectural design team headed by Bob Fowler. Construction took three years and $12 million.

Abravanel Hall first opened in September 1979, and was originally known as Symphony Hall, but was renamed in May 1993 for Maurice Abravanel, conductor of the Utah Symphony. The grand opening featured Stanisław Skrowaczewski guest conducting Béla Bartók's Concerto for Orchestra and Johannes Brahms' Symphony No. 4 on September 14–15, 1979. In 1998, the Hall underwent an expansion project which added wheelchair accessible restrooms, a new Ticket Office, and a new reception room. The expanded facility hosted several events during the 2002 Olympics Arts Festival including a concert with Audra McDonald and the Utah Symphony; the building also was decorated with an image of a biathlete during the games.

== Architecture ==
The building was designed by FFKR Architects and acoustical design services were provided by Dr. Cyril M. Harris with the outcome of creating an environment of acoustic excellence. Harris was the acoustical consultant for the remodeled Avery Fisher Hall in New York City, the Kennedy Center in Washington D.C., and Orchestra Hall in Minneapolis, Minnesota.

The hall is actually a concrete building within a brick building. It is rectangular in shape, similar to some of the world's finest symphony halls, such as the Grosser Musikvereinssaal in Vienna, the Concertgebouw in Amsterdam, and Symphony Hall in Boston. The stage was designed strictly for use as a concert hall, and has no proscenium - meaning that it is an extension of the audience. Cello and bass players are also encouraged to make holes in the stage with their endpins, so that their sound resonates with the wood of the hall, and not just their instrument.

To enter the hall, patrons must pass through sound lock corridors designed to isolate the concert hall from the noise and confusion of the lobby. Inside the hall, there are convex curved surfaces on the walls and ceilings. There are no perfect ninety degree angles in the hall, because of their effect on sound.

Suspended from the ceiling are six 16 x 16-foot (4.9 m) brass chandeliers with 18,000 hand-cut beads and prisms of Bohemian crystals imported from Austria and Czechoslovakia. The lobby is four stories high, with a white oak and brass ceiling, and a 5,400-square-foot (500 m^{2}) glass curtain or wall which covers much of the East face of the triangular-shaped lobby. The lobby itself is an architectural marvel due to its many tiers, the staircase that goes upwards and to the left along with the triangular shape of the enclosure, and the gold leafing that covers all visible sides of the stairs and balconies.

The lobby also features a 30-foot-high (9.1 m) red blown-glass sculpture (The Olympic Tower, by renowned glass artist Dale Chihuly) that is displayed prominently in the middle. This piece was purchased in 2002, after private donors and the Salt Lake Organizing Committee raised Chihuly's asking price of $625,000. The Olympic Tower was valued at $900,000, although Chihuly was willing to sell it at the lower cost pursuant to an agreement that it would stay at Abravanel Hall and that the public would be able to view it without attending a show.

== See also ==
- List of concert halls
