= Lyceum Music Festival =

Coordinates: 40°31′31″N 111°29′21″W

The Lyceum Music Festival, founded in 2008, is an orchestra festival presented in collaboration with the Utah Symphony's Deer Valley Music Festival located in just outside Zion National Park at Zion Ponderosa Ranch. LMF provides mentoring for musicians ages 14 to 21 and presents a series of concerts.

== History ==
The Festival was founded by Kayson Brown as an effort to connect young musicians with professional performers. With the cooperation of the Utah Symphony and support from sponsoring organization American Heritage School, Lyceum Music Festival grew from a half-week day camp to a week-long festival with lodging. In 2012, the orchestra performed "Beethoven's 5 Secrets" with The Piano Guys on YouTube which had received 2 million hits within 2 months of its release.

== Program ==
Students perform alongside renowned recording artists in chamber and symphonic concerts at the conclusion of the week. These concerts, presented at the OC Tanner Amphitheater and are open to the public. Approximately 100 students from across the United States participate.

For participants, the festival provides insights into classical music careers while helping students to acquire the skills necessary to performing at the professional level. Students prepare a professional level concert that features renowned guest artists. Those preparations include instrument specific training with Utah Symphony musicians, chamber music coaching with emerging professional string quartets, and working closely with professional conductors and guest artists in daily rehearsals. Recreation, leadership training, and entertainment activities are likewise an important element of the Festival.

== Guest artists ==
Guest artists include Billboard-topping recording artists and award-winning faculty from professional symphony orchestras. Simply Three, The Piano Guys (four times), Igor and Vesna Gruppman, Nathan Pacheco, The 5 Browns, Jenny Oaks Baker, Steven Sharp Nelson, David Cho, Kayson Brown, Muir String Quartet, Keith Lockhart, and David Lockington.
