= Reginald Beales =

American violinist (1898–1988)

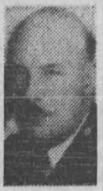
- Born: October 10, 1898; Bradford, England
- Died: July 1, 1988 (aged 89); Salt Lake City, Utah, U.S.
- Occupation: Violinist

Reginald J. H. Beales (October 10, 1898 – July 1, 1988) was an American violinist and music teacher. He began learning the violin at the age of eight and accompanied silent movies by the age of 14. He studied the violin under Michael Baxte in New York City. He moved to Salt Lake City, Utah, where he was a violin instructor at the McCune School of Music and an orchestra conductor at the American Theater. He managed the Federal Music Project in Utah in 1935 where he formed the Utah State Sinfonietta (later renamed the Utah Symphony). After losing funding for the orchestra after the Great Depression, Beales and others organized the Utah State Symphony Orchestra Association. Beales retired from teaching and performing in 1987. Beales was honored by the University of Utah and Utah governor Calvin L. Rampton for his musical contributions. By the time of his death, he was described as "one of Utah's most distinguished musicians" in the Deseret News. His musical scores are in the Harold B. Lee Library at Brigham Young University. In his personal life, Beales married Mesia Jenson in 1923. He was a member of the Church of Jesus Christ of Latter-day Saints.

== Biography ==
Born in Bradford, Beales started learning the violin when he was eight. By the age of 14, he had a job playing music to accompany silent movies. He also studied the violin in New York, taught by Michael Baxte. Beales was passionate about the violin throughout his life. After moving to Utah, he married Mesia Jensen in Salt Lake City in 1923 and had six children. In Utah, he worked as a violin instructor at the McCune School of Music. He also conducted the orchestra at the American Theater in Salt Lake City.

Beales converted to the Church of Jesus Christ of Latter-day Saints while living in Bradford and emigrated to the United States, where he was selected to manage the Federal Music Project in Utah during the Great Depression in 1935. Under Beales' direction, the project formed the Utah State Sinfonietta, also known as the WPA orchestra, which performed over 1,000 concerts for the state of Utah within five years. During this time, Beales continued directing the group and conducting the orchestra. He also performed as a soloist. The orchestra performed for schools, at the capitol building, in the LDS assembly hall, and at Memory Grove. When federal funds no longer supported the orchestra after the Great Depression, Beales and other people in the community organized the Utah State Symphony Orchestra Association through the Utah State Institute of Fine Arts so that the group could continue performing. The orchestra was renamed the Utah Symphony in 1946.

He spent time as a missionary for the Church of Jesus Christ of Latter-day Saints in the United States as a young man and in Scotland later in life. Beales retired in 1987 after playing in concerts and on radio programs for many years, as well as teaching violin throughout his career.

== Legacy ==
Governor Calvin L. Rampton and the University of Utah both honored Beales for his contributions to music in Utah. The Utah Symphony, with its roots in Beales' WPA orchestra, still performs in Utah today.

The L. Tom Perry Special Collections at Brigham Young University hold original manuscripts by Reginald Beales, including "Bless Me with Faith" and "Leola", as well as published scores collected and used by the WPA orchestra. Beales holds the copyright for the songs "My Heart Has a Song Just For You" and "White Crosses in the Moonlight".
