= Teresh =

Teresh may refer to:

- Bigthan and Teresh, eunuchs in service of the Persian king Ahasuerus, according to the Book of Esther
- Teresh, Sea Peoples that attacked ancient Egypt
