= Esther (Weisgall opera) =

Esther is an American opera in 3 acts composed by Hugo Weisgall, with a libretto by Charles Kondek. Esther was premiered by the New York City Opera in October 1993. The opera is about Esther's struggle as she becomes the queen of Persia, and her heroic triumph over the evil Prime Minister Haman and his plot of exterminating the Jews.

== Background ==
Esther was a Jewish queen of the Persian Empire, the wife of Ahasuerus (also known as Xerxes I). Today, her story is best known through its telling in Jewish Scriptures and the Old Testament of the Christian Bible. As a result of Esther's intervention and influence, Mizrahi Jews lived in the Persian Empire for 2400 years thereafter. Jews established an annual feast, the feast of Purim, in memory of their deliverance. Weisgall is one of few composers to use the character Esther as a subject, including Palestrina, Handel, and Milhaud.

Esther was Weisgall's 10th and last opera. It was considered one of his most successful works, along with Six Characters in Search of an Author, which confirmed his reputation as a major 20th-century American composer. Despite the background and sources of the subject, Weisgall composed Esther with no discernible attempt to adapt Persian music or style in his opera. The opera remained post-modernist, with strong Second Viennese School influence, although not entirely atonal. Weisgall descended from four generations of cantors, including his father, and as a result, absorbed from an early age the musical traditions of the Jews of central Europe as well as the standard opera and song repertory, which influenced the writing for Esther.

== Premiere ==
Although Weisgall's Esther was originally commissioned by the San Francisco Opera, the project came to a halt in 1990. It was resurrected, however, by Christopher Keene and New York City Opera for their 50th anniversary celebration in 1993. The company's stunning yet simple production was praised by press across the states. Designed by Jerome Sirlin and lit by Jeff Davis, the premiere was conducted by Joseph Colaneri and directed by Christopher Mattaliano. A strong cast was led by Lauren Flanigan in the title role.

The opera was revived to open New York City Opera's 2009 season with Christopher Mattaliano and James Sirlin returning from the artistic team and Lauren Flanigan again singing the role of Esther.

== Reception ==
By all counts, the premiere of Esther was a great success. Both critical and audience reaction favored the new opera, performed as one of a festival of American operas. The New York Times' critic Edward Rothstein wrote, "The composer's triumph could not have been more complete." The New York Times wrote: "When Weisgall took curtain calls, the ovation was so thunderous, you would have thought that Verdi had risen from the dead."

Despite the enthusiastic reception of the premiere, Esther was not performed again by a major opera company until it opened the New York City Opera's 2009–10 season.

== Roles ==
Role	Voice type	Premiere Cast, October 8, 1993 (Conductor: Joseph Colaneri)
Esther	soprano	Lauren Flanigan
Gravedigger	bass	John Calvin West
Mordecai	baritone	Joseph Corteggiano
Bigthan	tenor	James Russell
Teresh	bass	Boyd Schlaefer
Servant	tenor	Steven Raiford
Vashti	mezzo-soprano	Robynne Redmon
Haman	Tenor	Allan Glassman
Xerxes	baritone	Eugene Perry
Hegai	countertenor	Thomas Mark Fallon
Reader	tenor	Michael Lockley
Zeresh	mezzo-soprano	Joyce Castle

== Synopsis ==
(3 Acts, 12 Scenes)

The story unfolds in Susa, in ancient Persia. King Xerxes has banished Queen Vashti and is looking for a new wife. Esther, a beautiful Jewish maiden, is informed by her uncle Mordecai that she has been summoned to the court harem. Vashti seeks revenge for her banishment by plotting to have Xerxes poisoned. Mordecai discovers this plot and informs the King.

Haman, the King's Prime Minister, and his wife Zeresh plan to exterminate all the Jews in the entire kingdom on the 13th of Adar as retribution for Mordecai's unwillingness to bow to Haman. Xerxes, completely under Haman's influence, signs the edict.

Mordecai begs Esther, now the Queen, to ask Xerxes to intercede for the Jewish people, even though the law states that approaching the King unsummoned is a capital offense. When Esther approaches her husband, Xerxes pardons her, and grants her any favor she requests. Esther says she will reveal her wish at a banquet. There, Esther divulges that she is Jewish and demands that Haman and his sons be hanged. Since Xerxes cannot revoke his earlier edict against the Jews, she also asks that the Jews be allowed to defend themselves on the 13th of Adar. The Jews celebrate their survival and their gratitude to Esther.
