= How I Learned to Drive =

1997 play by Paula Vogel

- Original language: English
- Written by: Paula Vogel
- Characters: Li'l Bit; Uncle Peck; Male Greek Chorus; Female Greek Chorus; Teenage Greek Chorus
- Genre: Drama

Premiere
- Date: March 16, 1997
- Place: Vineyard Theatre; Off-Broadway

How I Learned to Drive is a play written by American playwright Paula Vogel. The play premiered on March 16, 1997, Off-Broadway at the Vineyard Theatre. Vogel received the 1998 Pulitzer Prize for Drama for the work. It was written and developed at the Perseverance Theatre in Juneau, Alaska, with Molly Smith as artistic director.

The story follows the abusive yet supportive relationship between Li'l Bit and her Uncle Peck, from her pre-adolescence through her teenage years into college and beyond. Using the metaphor of driving and the issues of pedophilia, incest, and misogyny, the play explores the ideas of control and manipulation.

== Plot synopsis ==
The play tells the story of a woman nicknamed Li'l Bit as she comes to terms with her sexually abusive relationship with her Uncle Peck throughout her adolescence. Aside from Li'l Bit and Uncle Peck, a Greek Chorus of three is on hand to play all of the other characters in their lives. The script is a memory play told largely out of chronological order, with the first scene taking place in 1969 in a parking lot in rural Maryland. Li'l Bit is 17 years old and sitting in Uncle Peck's car. Peck unhooks her bra through her shirt, an act that Li'l Bit finds uncomfortable. Li'l Bit mentions she is graduating high school and going to a "fancy college" in the fall, while Uncle Peck touches and gropes her.

Li'l Bit breaks from this scene to describe her family to the audience. She explains her family's penchant for handing out nicknames based on genitalia, which is why she was branded with the alias Li'l Bit for life. This includes her alcoholic mother, the "titless wonder", her misogynistic grandfather "Big Papa", her submissive grandmother, and her young Cousin BB (Blue Balls). A typical family dinner in 1969 has Li'l Bit's family (played by the three Greek Chorus members) cracking jokes about how "well-endowed" she is. Peck is the only family member who supports Li'l Bit's dreams of going to school. Frustrated, Li'l Bit leaves the dinner after Grandfather goes too far with his insults. Peck's wife Mary (Li'l Bit's maternal aunt) asks him to comfort Li'l Bit, indicating that she (Mary) is ignorant of his abuse.

Li'l Bit reveals that she eventually lost her scholarship and was expelled from college because of a drinking problem. She spent most of that year driving on highways, marveling at how well Peck had taught her to drive. She then has a memory of 1968, where Uncle Peck takes her to a fancy Eastern Shore restaurant as a reward for passing her driver's test on the first try. Peck slyly orders oysters and martinis for Li'l Bit to consume, while the girl's mother gives less than stellar advice on drinking alcohol. Li'l Bit and her mother both become increasingly drunk on martinis. Peck carries the drunk Li'l Bit to his car, where they discuss the nature of their relationship. Li'l Bit drunkenly kisses her uncle and then retreats. Peck reiterates that they won't do anything until she wants to do it and that he will be patient. Li'l Bit begins to question the appropriateness of her relationship with her Uncle.

The Teenage Greek Chorus member briefly takes over to introduce a memory that is not Li'l Bit's. In a monologue, Uncle Peck gives the unseen Cousin BB a fishing lesson, where it is strongly implied that he uses this as a cover to molest the boy the same way he used driving to abuse Li'l Bit. Li'l Bit takes control once again to recount a conversation she had with her mother and grandmother about sex. Mother tries to be helpful in explaining topics such as orgasms and consent, while Grandmother wails that Li'l Bit is too young to know about sex and uses scare tactics to keep her from doing it until she is married. The adult Li'l Bit breaks the memory to explain that she went on to have a one-night stand with a high school senior when she was twenty-seven, recognizing the allure of a younger person that her uncle once felt. She then returns to the memory, which turns into an argument between Mother and the Grandparents. Unable to deal with that memory again, Li'l Bit changes the memory (as part of the driving metaphor, she likens this to changing stations on the radio) to when Uncle Peck first taught her how to start up a car. Showing that he does have genuine concern for Li'l Bit beyond her body, Peck gives reasonable advice on how to be safe on the road while also setting more boundaries on their relationship. Li'l Bit becomes confused as to how Peck could abuse her while still being helpful.

The next scene is a series of vignettes on Li'l Bit's school days in 1966, where she faced ridicule and sexual harassment from the other students on account of her large breasts. A boy asks her to dance at a school sock hop, but Li'l Bit refuses, believing he just wants to see her breasts "jiggle" while she dances.

The scenes shifts to 1965, where Uncle Peck takes provocative "pin-up" photos of then 13-year-old Li'l Bit. Aunt Mary takes the stage to defend her husband's actions to the audience. She claims that he is a good man, and that it is all Li'l Bit's fault for leading him on. She believes that her marriage can be saved as soon as her niece goes off to college.

On Christmas Day 1964, 13-year-old Li'l Bit helps Uncle Peck wash the dishes. Li'l Bit questions where Peck was during Thanksgiving, implying that he entered a rehab for his alcoholism. Peck reveals that drinking helped him deal with a hidden pain that no one, not even Aunt Mary, could fix. Li'l Bit offers to spend one day a week with Uncle Peck, so long as he never "crosses a line," implying that Li'l Bit already knows what he's capable of.

The scene flashes forward to 1969, Li'l Bit's freshman year of college. The Greek Chorus lists the letters and gifts that Peck sends her, with each note counting down how many days are left until her 18th birthday. Startled by how unhinged her uncle has become, Li'l Bit arranges a meeting in a Philadelphia hotel room on December 10, 1969. Li'l Bit yells at Uncle Peck for becoming so possessive, while he insists that his niece is the love of his life. Li'l Bit reveals that she's getting confused and is seriously questioning this relationship, leading to her not focusing in school and failing her courses. After he kneels and proposes to Li'l Bit, vowing to divorce Aunt Mary, Li'l Bit turns him down and cuts him out of her life for good. She never sees Peck again after she leaves the hotel room.

Li'l Bit returns to the present to explain what became of Peck after she left: He turned to alcohol after years of sobriety, leading to the loss of his job, his marriage, and his driver's license. He went on to die after drunkenly falling down a flight of stairs in his basement. Li'l Bit reflects on why her uncle may have molested her, wondering if someone did it to him when he was a child.

Li'l Bit has one more memory to share: the summer of 1962. An 11-year-old Li'l Bit fights with her mother about going on a seven-hour car trip to the beach with Uncle Peck. Mother is wary of him, but finally relents, telling Li'l Bit that she holds her responsible for any misdeeds. Li'l Bit sits in the car with Uncle Peck, only she doesn't speak her lines out loud. The Teenage Greek Chorus, acting as young Li'l Bit, does so. Peck molests his niece for the first time.

The script then returns to the present. Li'l Bit reflects on how she is ready to move on with her life, and that although she does not excuse the abuse, she can thank her Uncle Peck for one thing: the freedom she feels when she drives. The final scene has Li'l Bit alone in her car, and as she adjusts her rear view mirror, she notices Uncle Peck in the back. After observing him, she steps on the gas pedal and drives away, finally leaving Peck in the past as she drives off to a new chapter of her life.

== Background ==
Vogel wrote the play at the Perseverance Theatre, Alaska, where she was in residence. The theatre presented a first reading. Vogel was inspired by the novel Lolita by Vladimir Nabokov: "...she was stunned to find herself sympathizing with the narrator, Humbert Humbert, who sexually molests an adolescent girl."

Vogel explained: "...she intended the play 'to get the audience to go along for a ride they wouldn't ordinarily take, or don't even know they're taking.'"

== Productions ==
How I Learned to Drive premiered Off-Broadway in a production by the Vineyard Theatre (Douglas Aibel, Artistic Director; Jon Nakagawa, Managing Director) on May 6, 1997, and closed on April 19, 1998, at the Century Center For The Performing Arts. The play was directed by Mark Brokaw, set design was by Narelle Sissons, costume design was by Jess Goldstein, lighting design was by Mark McCullough, and the original sound design was by David van Tieghem. The play had been presented by the Vineyard Theatre in February to April 1997. The Vineyard Theatre production, in association with Daryl Roth and Roy Gabay, moved to the Century Theatre in April 1997. The original cast:

- Li'l Bit played by Mary-Louise Parker
- Uncle Peck played by David Morse
- Male Greek Chorus played by Michael Showalter
- Female Greek Chorus played by Johanna Day
- Teenage Greek Chorus played by Kerry O'Malley
- Bruce Davison and Jayne Atkinson took over the lead roles in September 1997, and Molly Ringwald played Li'l Bit as of October 7, 1997. The Male Greek Chorus was played by Christopher Duva.

A production ran at Center Stage in Baltimore in 1998 and was directed by Barry Edelstein.

The play was produced at the Arena Stage in Washington, D.C., in 1999, directed by Molly Smith.

A 1999 production at the Mark Taper Forum in Los Angeles featured Molly Ringwald and Brian Kerwin.

In 2006 the play was produced by the T. Schreiber Studio and Theater in New York City. The L Magazine review commented: "Vogel’s play is twisted, smart (drive: metaphors for control, anyone?) and ultimately tragic, though shrewdly staggered moments of levity and candor keep it from Lifetime lows." This critically acclaimed production was directed by Terry Schreiber and received 10 New York Innovative Theatre (NYIT) Award nominations. Trey Gibbons won the NYIT Award for Outstanding Actor in a Featured Role.

L.A. Theatre Works produced an audio performance of the play, starring Glenne Headly, Randall Arney, Joy Gregory, Paul Mercier, and Rondi Reed.

The play was produced in Spanish by DETUCH Company in various theaters in Santiago, Chile in 2008, with Alejandra Díaz Scharager (Lil' Bit), Víctor Montero (Uncle Peck), Gabriel Urzúa (Male Greek Chorus), Annie Murath (Female Greek Chorus) and Carolina Larenas (Teenage Greek Chorus), directed by Marco Espinoza Quezada. It was also produced at the Teatro auditorio de Miraflores in Lima, Peru, in 2013, with Li'l Bit renamed "Rayita" and played by Leticia Poirier and Uncle Peck renamed "Tío Pico" and played by Marcelo Rivera. Ebelin Ortiz directed.

In 2012 Second Stage Theatre produced the first professional production of the play in New York City since its premiere in 1997. The work was directed by Kate Whoriskey and starred Norbert Leo Butz as Uncle Peck and Elizabeth Reaser as Li'l Bit. The production opened February 13, 2012 and was favorably reviewed by The New York Times.

In 2012 University of Vermont's Department of Theatre produced the play with Vogel attending and addressing a symposium on women writers. Natalie Battistone and Colby Morgan played the lead roles. The production was directed by Department of Theatre Chair Gregory Ramos.

In 2015, the play received its first professional London revival at Southwark Playhouse, starring Olivia Poulet as Li'l Bit and William Ellis as Peck, directed by Jack Sain, produced by D.E.M. Productions for Fools & Kings Theatre, with set and costume design by Katharine Heath, lighting design by Ziggy Jacobs, and composition and sound design by Nathan Klein.

In June 2019 the play was performed in Singapore by Wag the Dog Theatre Ltd., with Victoria Mintey as L'il Bit and Sean Worrall as Uncle Peck. It was directed by Warren Baumgart, Jr.

The play was set to premiere on Broadway in previews on March 27, 2020, and officially on April 22 with Mary-Louise Parker and David Morse reprising their roles from the original off-Broadway production, with original director Mark Brokaw helming the production. However, in the wake of the 2019-20 coronavirus epidemic and The Broadway League's subsequent closure of all Broadway performances until June 7, 2020, the production was postponed indefinitely, with hopes to return the following season. In June 2021, it was announced that the production would begin previews on March 29, 2022, at the Samuel J. Friedman Theatre and officially open on April 19.

== Critical reception ==
Jill Dolan, in her review in Theatre Journal, wrote of the original 1997 Off-Broadway production: "Vogel’s choice to remember Li’l Bit and Peck’s relationship nonchronologically illustrates its complexity, and allows the playwright to build sympathy for a man who might otherwise be despised and dismissed as a child molester....Vogel builds the relationship in scenes sculpted with spare efficiency by Brokaw that crystallize moments of trust, disappointment, longing, and desire."

The CurtainUp reviewer of the original 1997 Off-Broadway production wrote: "Ms. Vogel has achieved the seemingly impossible: A story about a disturbing subject, pedophilia, that is as funny--yes, really,--as it is disturbing. Li'l Bit (Mary-Louise Parker) and Uncle Peck (David Morse) are painted with the delicate brush strokes of a sumi painting, more subtle than sensational, and as unstereotypical a victim and victimizer as Lolita and Humbert Humbert (from Nabokov's Lolita which the playwright credits as her inspiration)...Before I say one more word, this is one of the must-see events of the season..."

The Baltimore Sun reviewer wrote of the 1998 Center Stage production: "The surprising gift Vogel has given her two main characters is that, instead of labeling them good and evil, or victim and criminal, she treats them both with respect."

Ben Brantley, in his The New York Times review of the original 1997 production, wrote: "The scrambled chronology, which suggests the ways memories attack by stealth and out of sequence, makes it harder for the audience to form conventional judgments. More surprisingly, it clarifies the patterns in the relationship between niece and uncle: of degrees of responsibility, feelings of guilt and shifts in power. Ms. Vogel is too intelligent to present this simply as a study in victim versus villain or to fail to acknowledge that what's happening is, in some appalling way, a real love story." Brantley, in his The New York Times review of the 2012 Second Stage production, wrote: "It is a performance that captures Ms. Vogel's remarkable, clear-eyed empathy in portraying the incalculable damage done by damaged people".

== Awards and nominations ==
=== 1997 Off-Broadway Production ===
Year	Award	Category	Nominee	Result	Ref.
1997	Drama Desk Award	Outstanding Play		Won	
1997	Drama Desk Award	Outstanding Actor in a Play	David Morse	Won	
1997	Drama Desk Award	Outstanding Director of a Play	Mark Brokaw	Won	
1997	Outer Critics Circle Award	Outer Critics Circle Award for Outstanding New Off-Broadway Play		Won	
1997	Outer Critics Circle Award	Actor in a Play	David Morse	Nominated	
1997	Outer Critics Circle Award	Actress in a Play	Mary-Louise Parker	Nominated	
1997	Lucille Lortel Awards	Outstanding Play		Won	
1997	Lucille Lortel Awards	Outstanding Director	Mark Brokaw	Won	
1997	Lucille Lortel Awards	Outstanding Lead Actor in a Play	David Morse	Won	
1997	Lucille Lortel Awards	Outstanding Lead Actress in a Play	Mary-Louise Parker	Won	
1997	Obie Award	Outstanding Playwrighting	Paula Vogel	Won	
1997	Obie Award	Outstanding Direction	Mark Brokaw	Won	
1997	Obie Award	Outstanding Performance	David Morse	Honored	
1997	Obie Award	Outstanding Performance	Mary-Louise Parker	Honored	
1997	New York Drama Critics' Circle Award	Best Play		Won	
1998	Pulitzer Prize for Drama		Paula Vogel	Won	

=== 2022 Broadway Production ===
Year	Award	Category	Nominee	Result	Ref.
2022	Tony Award	Best Revival of a Play		Nominated	
2022	Tony Award	Leading Actor in a Play	David Morse	Nominated	
2022	Tony Award	Leading Actress in a Play	Mary-Louise Parker	Nominated	
2022	Drama Desk Award	Outstanding Revival of a Play		Nominated	
2022	Outer Critics Circle Award	Outstanding Revival of a Play		Nominated	
