= Maurice Abravanel =

Ottoman-born American conductor (1903–1993)

Background information
- Also known as: Maurice de Abravanel
- Born: January 6, 1903; Thessaloniki, Rumelia Province, Ottoman Empire
- Died: September 22, 1993 (aged 90) Salt Lake City, Utah, United States
- Occupation: Conductor
- Instrument: Piano

Maurice Abravanel (January 6, 1903 – September 22, 1993) was an American classical music conductor. He is remembered as the conductor of the Utah Symphony for over 30 years.

== Life ==
Abravanel was born in Salonika, Rumelia Eyalet, Ottoman Empire (modern Thessaloniki, Greece). He came from an illustrious Sephardic Jewish family, which was expelled from Spain in 1492 (see Isaac Abrabanel). Abravanel's ancestors settled in Salonika in 1517, and his parents were both born there. In 1909, the Abravanel family moved to Lausanne, Switzerland, where his father, Edouard de Abravanel, was a successful pharmacist.

For several years, the Abravanels lived in the same house as Ernest Ansermet, the conductor of the Orchestre de la Suisse Romande. The young Abravanel played four-hand piano arrangements with Ansermet, began to compose, and met composers such as Darius Milhaud and Igor Stravinsky. He was passionate about music and knew he wanted a career as a musician. He became the pianist for the municipal theatre and music critic for the city's daily newspaper.

Maurice's father, however, insisted on a career in medicine and sent him to the University of Zürich, where he was miserable at having to dissect corpses. He wrote to his father that he would rather be second percussionist in an orchestra than a doctor, and his father finally relented.

Abravanel lived in Germany from 1922 to 1933, heavily involving himself in the music scene there. He lived in Paris from 1933 to 1936, serving as music director of Balanchine's Paris Ballet, then conducting for two years in Australia. In 1936 Abravanel accepted a post at New York's Metropolitan Opera, becoming at age 33 the youngest conductor the Met had ever hired. He became a U.S. citizen in 1943. In 1947 he was hired as music director of the Utah Symphony, and over the next 30 years raised the ensemble to international prominence, leading the symphony in live radio broadcasts and releasing more than 100 commercial recordings.

Abravanel was known as Maurice de Abravanel until 1938. He married singer Friedel Schako in 1933 and the couple moved to Paris that year when the Nazis came to power. The marriage ended in divorce in 1940, after Schako eloped with the conductor Otto Klemperer: the pair "went careering around the country... leaving a trail of unpaid bills." In 1947, Abravanel married Lucy Menasse Carasso; they remained married until her death. He married his third wife, Carolyn Firmage, in 1987. He died in 1993 in Salt Lake City, Utah, at the age of 90.

== Music career ==
In 1922, during the depression of the Weimar Republic, Abravanel, then age 19, moved to Berlin. Despite the difficult economic situation, Berlin supported three opera houses, which staged performances every night of the year. Wilhelm Furtwängler, Bruno Walter, Richard Strauss and Otto Klemperer were all conducting opera in Berlin at that time.

Abravanel became a student of the composer Kurt Weill (three years his senior), who had to accept up to 46 students to make ends meet. Abravanel later commented that Weill was "a lousy teacher", but became his close friend and enthusiastic supporter. After a year of study, Abravanel landed a job as an accompanist at the opera in Neustrelitz, just north of Berlin. At the time, this was a good career path towards becoming a conductor because the accompanist rehearsed and coached the singers and would sometimes be called on to substitute when the conductor was unable to conduct at short notice.

In 1924, the theatre in Neustrelitz burned down, and the four conductors found work elsewhere. The members of the orchestra asked Abravanel if he would conduct performances at the castle. He conducted orchestra concerts twice a week at the castle with no rehearsal. He even received some pay.

In 1925, Abravanel received a position as choral director in Zwickau, in Saxony. He spent two years there, conducting the operetta repertoire. Because of his success in Zwickau, he was given a position as regular conductor at a better theatre in Altenburg.

After two years in Altenburg, Abravanel was appointed conductor at his first major opera house in Kassel. In 1931, the director of the Berlin State Opera saw him conduct a performance of Verdi's La forza del destino. He asked him to come to Berlin and conduct a performance at the Berlin State Opera. The orchestra was impressed and applauded Abravanel. This was important because at that time the orchestra decided whether a guest conductor would be asked to return. Abravanel became a regular guest conductor.

Because of the rise of Adolf Hitler, Jewish musicians were being forced to leave Germany. Feeling this danger, Abravanel chose to relocate to Paris, as did Kurt Weill, in 1933.

In Paris, he worked with Bruno Walter. Walter was a friend of and authority on the music of Gustav Mahler. Walter recommended Abravanel as a guest conductor at the Paris Opera, and he was able to cast, rehearse, and conduct Mozart's Don Giovanni there. He also had the opportunity to conduct the Orchestre Symphonique de Paris, the regular conductor of which was Pierre Monteux. He also met George Balanchine in Paris and conducted his ballets, as well as conducting the works of his old teacher and friend, Kurt Weill. Weill and Balanchine collaborated on a ballet, The Seven Deadly Sins, which had its premiere in Paris. Abravanel was the conductor.

Weill left Paris for London, and then New York (1935), and the Abravanels left Paris for Australia (1934). Maurice had been offered a chance to direct both the Melbourne and the Sydney opera. After a six-week journey through the Suez Canal and across the Indian Ocean, he arrived to be acclaimed as the "eminent continental conductor."

He conducted a 13-week season in Melbourne and a two-month season in Sydney with Verdi's Aida as the opener in both cities and a balanced selection of the standard repertoire, including Puccini, Wagner and Bizet.

In mid-spring of 1936, he received an offer from the Metropolitan Opera in New York to come and conduct the German and French repertoire. At age 33, Abravanel became the youngest contracted conductor in the history of the Met. He was offered a three-year contract, only two years of which were fulfilled, due to internal politics at the Met. For the next several years, Abravanel filled several temporary conducting stints on and around Broadway, and tried to emphasize Weill's music wherever possible.

In 1946 the community orchestra known as the Utah Symphony began advertising for a conductor, and Abravanel applied, stating that he wanted to build a permanent orchestra of his own. He was selected from a field of 40 applicants for the position, receiving a one-year contract. In accepting the Utah offer he had to reject a lucrative contract from Radio City Music Hall, and he ended up working without pay several times during the orchestra's darkest days. The one-year contract became a 32-year career. During that time Abravanel built the orchestra from a part-time community orchestra into a well-respected, professional ensemble with recording contracts with Vanguard, Vox, Angel, and CBS. He lobbied for years for a permanent home for the orchestra, and realized this dream when Salt Lake's Symphony Hall opened in September 1979, shortly after he had retired for health reasons.

In addition to becoming known as a major interpreter of classical composers, Abravanel championed contemporary music, recording the music of Crawford Gates and Leroy Robertson among others.

From 1954 to 1980, Abravanel also directed the Music Academy of the West in Montecito, California, where young musicians gathered for summer music camps. He taught conducting at Tanglewood, where he was appointed artist-in-residence for life. In his later years he received various honors: The American Symphony Orchestra League gave him its Gold Baton in 1981; President Bush presented him with the National Medal of Arts in 1991; and in 1993 Salt Lake City renamed its Symphony Hall Abravanel Hall.

Abravanel is remembered for making several classic recordings with the Utah Symphony for the US Vanguard label, including the Berlioz Requiem, orchestral works by Arthur Honegger, Erik Satie, Edgar Varèse and Ralph Vaughan Williams, as well as the first complete recording of Gustav Mahler's nine symphonies by an American orchestra.

== Honors ==
- Received Tony Award for conducting the music of Marc Blitzstein's opera, Regina on Broadway (1950)
- Member of the first music panel of the US National Endowment for the Arts (1970)
- Served on the National Council of the Arts (1970–1976)
- Received "Golden Baton" award from the American Symphony Orchestra League (1981)
- Appointed "Artist in Residence for Life" from the Tanglewood Music Festival (1981)
- Received the National Medal of Arts from US President George H. W. Bush (1991)
- Received Grammy Award nominations for several of his over 100 classical recordings with the Utah Symphony

== Sources ==
- Durham, Lowell, Abravanel!, Salt Lake City: University of Utah Press, 1989.
