= Deer Valley Music Festival =

Summer music festival in Park City, Utah, United States

Coordinates: 40°37′22″N 111°29′22″W

- Genre: Music; Arts festival
- Dates: July - August
- Locations: Park City, Utah, United States
- Years active: 2003–2019, 2021-
- Founders: Utah Opera
- Website: Deer Valley Music Festival

The Deer Valley Music Festival is the summer home of the Utah Symphony and Utah Opera. It occurs each summer in July and August in Park City, Utah at the Deer Valley Resort, St. Mary's Church, Temple Har Shalom, and salon performances in local homes. The festival features the Utah Symphony and its guests performing chamber music, symphonic music, opera, and popular music.

The festival is known for collaborations between popular artists and the Utah Symphony including Elvis Costello, LeAnn Rimes, Gladys Knight, Frederica von Stade, Jewel, Tony Bennett, Ben Folds, the Mormon Tabernacle Choir, Pink Martini, Randy Travis, Idina Menzel, Kansas, and Earth, Wind & Fire.

No festival was held in 2020.

== Format ==
The Festival takes place over five weeks in Park City, Utah. Performances on Wednesday night feature the Utah Symphony performing chamber orchestra music in the intimate setting of St. Mary's Catholic Church. Thursday night performances feature guest chamber ensembles, also typically at St. Mary's. Friday and Saturday night performances are typically classical music performances often with guest artists featuring popular music at Deer Valley Resort Snow Park Outdoor Amphitheater. Intimate salon performances by guest artists and members of the Utah Symphony at area homes are also a staple of the festival.

Education events held throughout the festival include masterclasses and the Emerging Quartets & Composers performance. The festival is also a collaborator in the Lyceum Music Festival, which features young musicians age 13 to 21.

== History ==
The festival was started in 2003 under the direction of Utah Symphony Music Director Keith Lockhart and Utah Symphony & Opera President & CEO Anne Ewers.

=== 2012 ===
The headlining performances of the 2012 festival were Earth, Wind & Fire and Pink Martini.

The Festival began with a tribute to Michael Jackson featuring James Delisco, winner of the E! reality series The Entertainer. Other Saturday night performances included Kansas with the Utah Symphony, Broadway Rocks! (with singers Morgan James, LaKisha Jones, Doug LaBrecque, and Rob Evan), Earth, Wind & Fire with the Utah Symphony, and Pink Martini with the Utah Symphony.

Friday night performances included the return of Utah Opera to the festival with an evening of opera arias (performed by the Utah Opera Chorus and guests Celena Shafer, Jennifer Welch-Babidge, Sishel Claverie, Darrell Babidge and Ryan MacPherson), the annual 1812 Overture performance which also included the Children's Dance Theater joining the orchestra for the Carnival of the Animals, and "The American Songbook" with the Mormon Tabernacle Choir. Disney in Concert: Magical Music from the Movies also returned to the festival.

The Utah Symphony's Chamber Orchestra Series featured three programs conducted by Vladimir Kulenovic. Mythic Romance featured violinist Sean Lee performing Antonín Dvořák's Romance for Violin and Orchestra as well as performances of Mozart's Overture to Don Giovanni and Schubert's Symphony No. 4. The French Connection featured music by French composers including Ravel, Debussy, Faure, and Gounod. The final performance of the series included three pieces written by Beethoven, Mozart, and Haydn during the brief period when all three composers were alive and active.

The Muir Quartet and the Jewish American Songbook were included on the Chamber Ensemble Series.
