= Lisa Emery =

American actress

- Born: Pittsburgh, Pennsylvania, U.S.
- Education: Hollins College
- Years active: 1985–present
- Spouse: Josh Pais
- Children: 1

Lisa Emery is an American stage, film, and television actress. Emery is best known for playing Darlene Snell on Netflix series Ozark.

== Early life ==
Emery was born in Pittsburgh, Pennsylvania, the daughter of an aspiring actress from Charlottesville, Virginia and an advertising executive who worked in Valley Forge, Pennsylvania. She attended Hollins College, where she planned to study painting, but became interested in drama classes instead because "they were having way more fun." After graduation she studied at the Circle in the Square Theatre School for a year, then began to audition.

Emery moved to New York with her then-longtime boyfriend. They eventually broke up and she enrolled in the Circle in the Square two-year program. She moved to the East Village in 1982.

== Career ==
Emery's theatre credits include The Matchmaker, Dinner with Friends (1999), What the Butler Saw (2000), The Prime of Miss Jean Brodie (2006), Talley & Son, Burn This (1987), Rumors, Present Laughter, The Women (2001), Marvin's Room (1991), Abigail's Party (2005), and Relatively Speaking (2011). She has been nominated for the Drama Desk Award for Outstanding Featured Actress in a Play three times.

Emery's film credits include A Map of the World, Unfaithful, and The Night Listener. On television she had a reoccurring role on Ed and has made guest appearances on Law & Order, Sex and the City, Law & Order: Special Victims Unit, Law & Order: Criminal Intent, Third Watch, Fringe, Damages and Jessica Jones. She also had a main cast role on Ozark.

Ben Brantley, chief theatre critic at The New York Times, wrote of Emery's performance in Harold Pinter’s A Kind of Alaska, “Lisa Emery gives one of the most affectingly detailed performances now on a New York stage.”

Charles Isherwood, in his review of Relatively Speaking (the one-act "George Is Dead" by Elaine May) for The New York Times, wrote of Emery: "Carla, a thankless straight-woman role played with skill by the fine Lisa Emery..."

In a July 2020 interview for The Natural Aristocrat, Emery spoke about enjoying the unpredictable nature of her Ozark character Darlene Snell. "Every time I get a script, I'm surprised, which is great. It's not like, 'Oh, there she goes again!' I think it's unpredictable what a great mother she is in her own way."

== Personal life ==
Emery was married to actor Josh Pais; their son, Zane, appeared with his mother in Margot at the Wedding.

Emery did not seek a film or television career and did not think of career strategies. "I take it as it comes... Perhaps I'd regret it if I were less happy now. I live perfectly well and love what I do."

== Awards and nominations ==
- Drama Desk Award 2011, Outstanding Featured Actress in a Play - The Collection & A Kind of Alaska (nominee)
- Drama Desk Award 2006, Outstanding Featured Actress in a Play - Abigail's Party (nominee)
- Drama Desk Award 1992, Outstanding Featured Actress in a Play - Marvin's Room (nominee)
- Lucille Lortel Award 2009, Outstanding Featured Actress - Distracted (nominee)
- Lucille Lortel Award 2006, Outstanding Featured Actress - Abigail's Party (nominee)
- Lucille Lortel Award 2004, Outstanding Lead Actress - Iron (nominee)
- Obie Awards 2003–2004, Outstanding Performance - Iron (winner)

== Filmography ==
=== Film ===
Year	Title	Role
1986	Dreamaniac	Rosie
1990	How to Be Louise	Nancy
1994	Wolf	Party Guest
1997	In & Out	Classroom Reporter
1998	Harvest	Alice Yates
1999	A Map of the World	Susan Durkin
2002	Unfaithful	Beth
2002	Roger Dodger	Woman in Bar
2002	People I Know	Elsa Nye
2003	Marci X	Parent
2006	The Night Listener	Darlie Noone
2006	Out There	Kris
2006	Brother's Shadow	Sylvia
2007	Margot at the Wedding	Woman with Dog
2009	Cold Souls	Cynthia
2013	Admission	Mrs. Pressman
2021	Catch the Fair One	Debra

=== Television ===
Year	Title	Role	Notes
1985	Doubletake	Brenda	Miniseries
1990	H.E.L.P.	Corinne Butler	Episode: "Steam Heat"
1991–2009	Law & Order	Attorney Weller / Meg Lafferty / Gwen Graham	5 episodes
1993	As the World Turns	Dawn Wheeler	Episode dated 15 January 1993
1993	Class of '96	Mrs. Farr	Episode: "Parents Weekend"
1998	Sex and the City	Ruth / Mid 30's Woman	Episode: "Three's a Crowd"
2000	Madigan Men	Brooke Payton	Episode: "The Kid's Alright"
2001	Far East	Julia Anderson	Television film
2002	Stage on Screen: The Women	Nancy Blake	Television film
2002–2004	Ed	Rita Vessey	3 episodes
2002, 2005, 2026	Law & Order: Special Victims Unit	Anna Gable / Mary Ellen Lesinski / Sarah Witt	3 episodes
2003	Queens Supreme	Mrs. Ali	Episode: "Permanent Markers"
2004	The Jury	Anneliese Rose	Episode: "Too Jung to Die"
2005	Third Watch	Ms. Perry	Episode: "The Kitchen Sink"
2005	Law & Order: Trial by Jury	Lynn Blaylock	Episode: "The Abominable Showman"
2007	Damages	Laura Watkins	Episode: "Sort of Like a Family"
2008	Canterbury's Law	Trial Judge	Episode: "Baggage"
2008	Law & Order: Criminal Intent	Callie's Mother	Episode: "Ten Count"
2008	Fringe	Paula Kramer	Episode: "The Cure"
2011	Louie	Karleen	2 episodes
2014	Those Who Kill	Irma	Episode: "Rocking the Boat"
2015	Elementary	Mrs. Barnes	Episode: "Absconded"
2015	Jessica Jones	Louise Thompson	4 episodes
2017–2022	Ozark	Darlene Snell	Main cast; 30 episodes
2018	The Sinner	Carolyn	Episode: "Part III"
2019	Madam Secretary	Maggie Brixton	Episode: "Proxy War"
2019	Blindspot	Linda Weller	Episode: "Everybody Hates Kathy"
2023–2026	The Walking Dead: Dead City	The Dama	Guest (season 1); Main cast (seasons 2–3); 11 episodes

=== Video games ===
Year	Title	Voice role
2006	Neverwinter Nights 2	Zhjaeve · Blooden
2026	Grand Theft Auto VI	Linda

=== Theatre ===
Year	Title	Role	Notes
1981	In Connecticut	Irene Call	Circle Theatre, Off-Broadway
1983	Passion	Kate (Understudy)	Longacre Theatre, Broadway
1987	Burn This	Anna Mann (Understudy)	Plymouth Theatre, Broadway
1988	Rumors	Cassie Cooper (Replacement)	Broadhurst Theatre, Broadway
1991	The Matchmaker	Irene Molloy	Roundabout Theatre Company, Off-Broadway
1992	Marvin's Room	Lee	Playwrights Horizons, Off-Broadway
1995	Watbanaland	Flo	WPA Theater, Off-Broadway
1995	The Monogamist	Susan Barry	Playwrights Horizons, Off-Broadway
1996	Present Laughter	Monica Reed	Walter Kerr Theatre, Broadway
1997	Jackie	Betty Fretz/Eunice Kennedy	Belasco Theatre, Broadway
1999	Far East	Julia	Lincoln Center, Off-Broadway
1999	Dinner With Friends	Karen	Variety Arts Theater, Off-Broadway
2000	What The Butler Saw	Mrs. Prentice	The New Group, Off-Broadway
2001	The Women	Nancy Blake	American Airlines Theatre, Broadway
2002	The Smell of the Kill	Nicky	Helen Hayes Theater, Broadway
2003	Iron	Fay	Manhattan Theatre Club, Off-Broadway
2005	Hot 'N Throbbing	Charlene	Signature Theatre Company, Off-Broadway
2005	Abigail's Party	Susan	Acorn Theatre, Off-Broadway
2006	The Prime of Miss Jean Brodie	Miss Mackay	The New Group, Off-Broadway
2008	Mouth to Mouth	Laura	The New Group, Off-Broadway
2009	Distracted	Vera	Roundabout Theatre Company, Off-Broadway
2010	A Kind of Alaska	Deborah	Atlantic Theater Company, Off-Broadway
2011	George is Dead	Carla	Brooks Atkinson Theatre, Broadway
2012	Lonely, I'm Not	Mother	Second Stage Theater, Off-Broadway
2013	The Unavoidable Disappearance of Tom Durnin	Karen	Roundabout Theatre Company, Off-Broadway
2014	Casa Valentina	Eleanor	Samuel J. Friedman Theatre, Broadway
2015	Marjorie Prime	Tess	Playwrights Horizons, Off-Broadway
2016	A Funny Thing Happened on the Way to the Gynecologic Oncology Unit at Memorial Sloan Kettering Cancer Center of New York City	Marcie	Lucille Lortel Theatre, Off-Broadway
2017	Six Degrees of Separation	Kitty	Ethel Barrymore Theatre, Broadway
2017	For Peter Pan on her 70th Birthday	Wendy	Playwrights Horizons, Off-Broadway
2018	I Was Most Alive With You	Pleasant	Playwrights Horizons, Off-Broadway
2025	Lunar Eclipse	Em	Second Stage Theater, Off-Broadway
