= Robert Fowler =

Robert or Bobby Fowler may refer to:

- Robert Fowler (archbishop of Dublin) (1724–1801), bishop in the Church of Ireland
- Robert Fowler (artist) (1853–1926), English artist
- Robert Fowler (athlete) (1882–1957), American marathoner
- Robert Fowler (Australian politician) (1840–1906), New South Wales politician
- Robert Fowler (bishop of Ossory) (1766–1841), bishop in the Church of Ireland; son of the archbishop of Dublin
- Robert Fowler (cyclist) (1931–2001), South African Olympic cyclist
- Robert Fowler (diplomat) (born 1944), Canadian diplomat
- Robert Fowler (surgeon, soldier) (1888–1965), Australian surgeon and soldier
- Sir Robert William Doughty Fowler (1914–1985), British diplomat
- Sir Robert Fowler, 1st Baronet (1828–1891), lord mayor of London
- Robert G. Fowler (1884–1966), American aviation pioneer
- Robert Henry Fowler (1857–1957), Irish cricketer; great-grandson of the Bishop of Ossory
- Robert St Leger Fowler (1891–1925), Irish cricketer; son of the above
- H. Robert Fowler (1851–1926), American politician from Illinois
- Robbie Fowler (born 1975), English footballer
- Bobby Jack Fowler (1939–2006), American criminal
- Robert Lee Fowler (1926-2004), American politician from Missouri
- Robert MacLaren Fowler (1906–1980), Canadian lawyer
- Robert Merrick Fowler (1778–1860), officer of the Royal Navy
- Robert Fowler (academic) (born 1954), classicist
- Bobby Fowler (American football) (born 1960), American football fullback
