= Hot 'N Throbbing =

1994 one-act play by Paula Vogel

Hot 'N' Throbbing is a 1994 one-act play written by Pulitzer Prize-winning playwright and Yale University professor Paula Vogel. The play is a confrontational statement on the intersection of pornography and domestic violence. It features adult language, mild violence, and full frontal male nudity.

== Production history ==
The play had a workshop at the Circle Repertory Theatre, New York City, in October 1992.

The play was developed with help from grants from the National Endowment for the Arts, a fellowship from the Bunting Institute, Radcliffe College, and residencies at the Rockefeller Foundation at Bellagio Center, Italy, and the Yaddo Colony, as well as a grant from the Fund for New American Plays.

It was produced at the American Repertory Theater (Cambridge, Massachusetts), in April 1994, directed by Anne Bogart (The Boston Herald, April 18, 1994). It was also produced at the Kitchen Theatre Company (Ithaca, NY), in fall 1996, and at the Perishable Theatre (Providence, RI), in April–May 11, 1997. (Providence Journal-Bulletin, April 17, 1997) The play was produced by the Arena Stage, Washington, D.C., in September 1999, directed by Molly Smith, the artistic director of Arena.

The play opened Off-Broadway, produced by the Signature Theatre Company, on March 28, 2005, and closed April 17, 2005. Directed by Les Waters, the cast included Lisa Emery (Charlene), Elias Koteas (Clyde), and Suli Holum (Leslie Ann).

== Characters ==
- Charlene; a middle aged single mother who writes feminist pornographic screenplays
- Calvin; Charlene's fourteen-year-old son. Calvin is a bookish voyeur.
- Leslie Ann; Charlene's sexually precocious daughter who dresses in clothing more suggestive than considered appropriate for a girl of fifteen.
- Clyde; Charlene's violent and alcoholic ex-husband
- The Voice-Over; an actress to stand in for Charlene's inner monologue and to enact her screenplay's contents onstage
- The Voice; an actor to stand in for the inner monologue of other characters, primarily Clyde.

== Plot synopsis ==
The central action of Hot 'N' Throbbing revolves around the arrival of Clyde late on a Friday night, drunk and intending to proposition Charlene despite a restraining order against him because of past domestic violence. When Charlene refuses to admit him, Clyde forces his way inside and she ineptly shoots him in the buttocks. Now sobered and incapacitated, Clyde's wound is tended to by Charlene and they take the opportunity to reminisce about old times (as well as the play's ideas about heterosexual relations) and reach an apparent reconciliation in which Charlene lets Clyde spend the night. Clyde explains that he came to his former home after patronizing an adult bookstore and failing to pick up a prostitute because of a lack of funds. As a final sex scene begins Clyde flies into a fit of rage and strangles Charlene with his belt.

== Themes ==
The play is a statement in the vein of thought which attributes domestic violence to the direct influence of pornography. This is in contrast to ideologies such as sex-positive feminism. A corollary subject is Vogel's indictment of attempts by pornographic film companies owned and operated by women to create positive alternatives to mainstream pornography. This is evoked by a flash-forward scene involving an adult actress who, despite believing that she is participating in a production utilizing one of Charlene's scripts, turns out to be the victim of a snuff film. Also discussed is the dysfunction of modern family relationships, the craft of writing, and adolescence.

Johnette Rodriguez, in her review in The Phoenix (Providence, RI), writes that "she [Vogel] ponders many questions about male/female relationships, about families and about American society, all related to an observation she makes in the introduction to the published version of the play: 'obscenity begins at home.' "

== Critical reception ==
In Jason Zinoman's New York Times review, the play is called "curious, clever and often frustrating jumble of a play", but that "this play seem as relevant as ever." However, his ultimate conclusion is that "the broad comedy is not quite funny enough and the tragic twists lack credibility."
