= Violette Mège =

Algerian artist (1889–1968)

- Violette Mège, from a 1930 newspaper.
- Born: March 19, 1889; Chabet el Ameur, French Algeria
- Died: May 12, 1968 (aged 79); Mexico
- Other names: Violet Mege; Violet Posner; Violette Mege de Baxte
- Occupation: Artist
- Spouse: Michael Baxte

Violette Clarisse Mège (March 19, 1889 – May 12, 1968) was an Algerian-born French artist, and teacher and wife of artist Michael Baxte.

== Early life ==
Mège was born to European parents Gaston Mège and Emma Barry, in Chabet el Ameur, Algeria. In 1914, Mège was the first woman to win a major Beaux Arts competition in Algeria, and won a scholarship to study art in France.

== Career ==
In Paris, Mège exhibited her art in 1916 and won another scholarship; with the money, she moved to New York with her sister, Emma. She exhibited her colorful still life paintings, street scenes, and portraits in New York beginning in 1917. "Miss Mege wastes no paint in telling her story," commented a New York reviewer in 1918. "There is an absence of detail often, but that only makes the work larger in effect." She was part of group shows at the Macdowell Club in 1918, and at the Waldorf in 1919 with the Society of Independent Artists.

In the early 1920s, Mège was a member of the board of directors of Salons of America, an exhibition organization for contemporary American artists. She had a solo show in 1930 at Alma Reed's Delphic Studios in New York, before she moved to France with her husband. They moved again, to Mexico City, in 1941, to escape wartime Europe. By 1942, she was exhibiting her work in Mexico City. She taught her husband to paint, and he became a notable artist.

== Personal life ==
Violette Mège was married to the Belarus-born American musician and artist Michael Baxte. Mège died in 1968, aged 79 years.
