= Michael Baxte =

American painter

- Born: January 27, 1890; Staroselje, Belarus
- Died: 1972 (aged 81–82); Mexico
- Occupation: Painter

Michael Posner Baxte (January 27, 1890 – 1972) was an American violinist and painter, born in Staroselje, Belarus. His work was part of the painting event in the art competition at the 1936 Summer Olympics. His wife was Algerian-born artist Violette Mège (1889–1968).
