= Utah Symphony =

American orchestra

Utah Symphony (USO, USUO)
- Orchestra
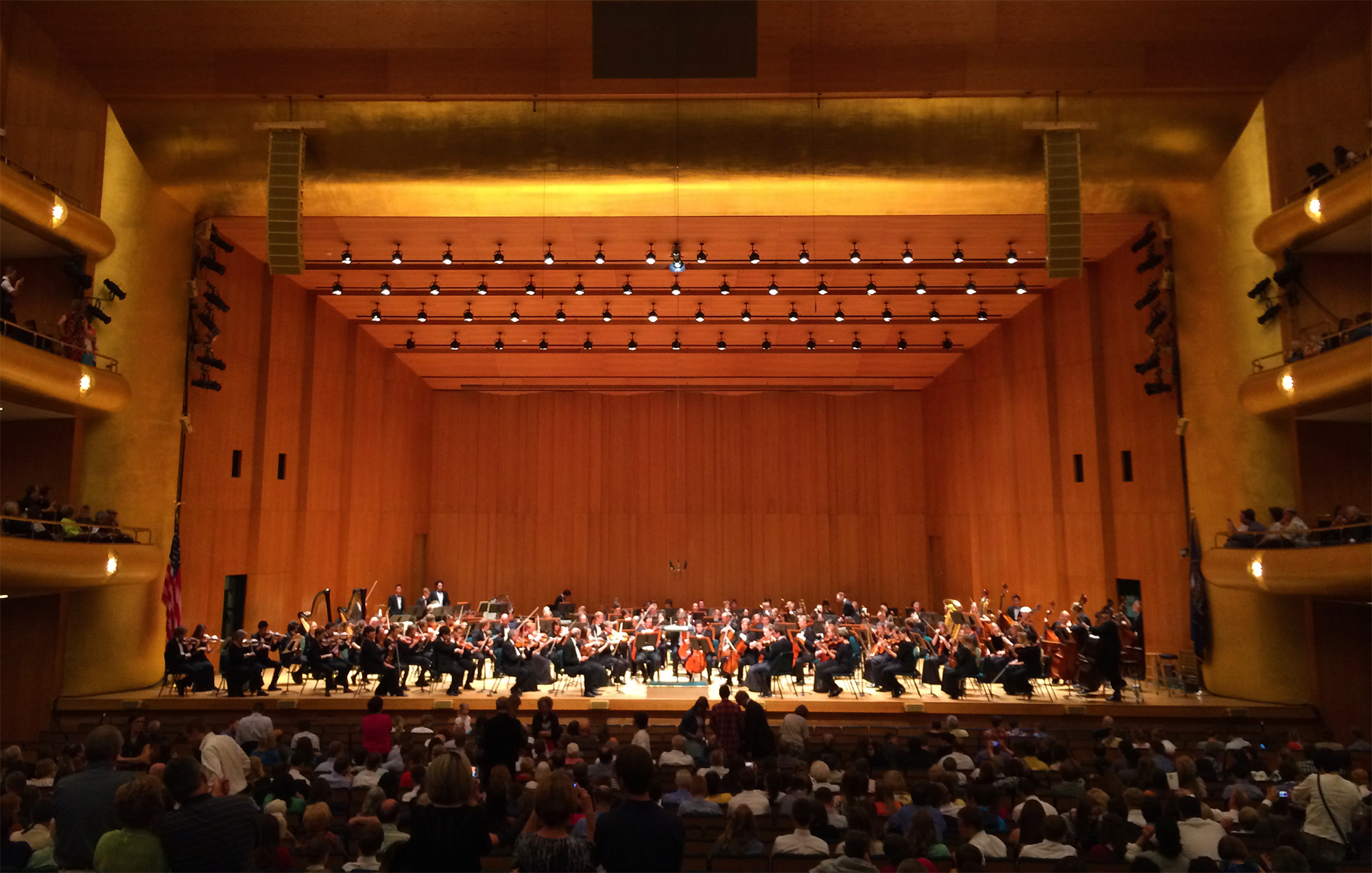
- The Utah Symphony at Abravanel Hall in Salt Lake City
- Founded: 1940
- Location: Salt Lake City, Utah
- Concert hall: Abravanel Hall
- Principal conductor: Markus Poschner (designate, effective 2027)
- Website: www.utahsymphony.org

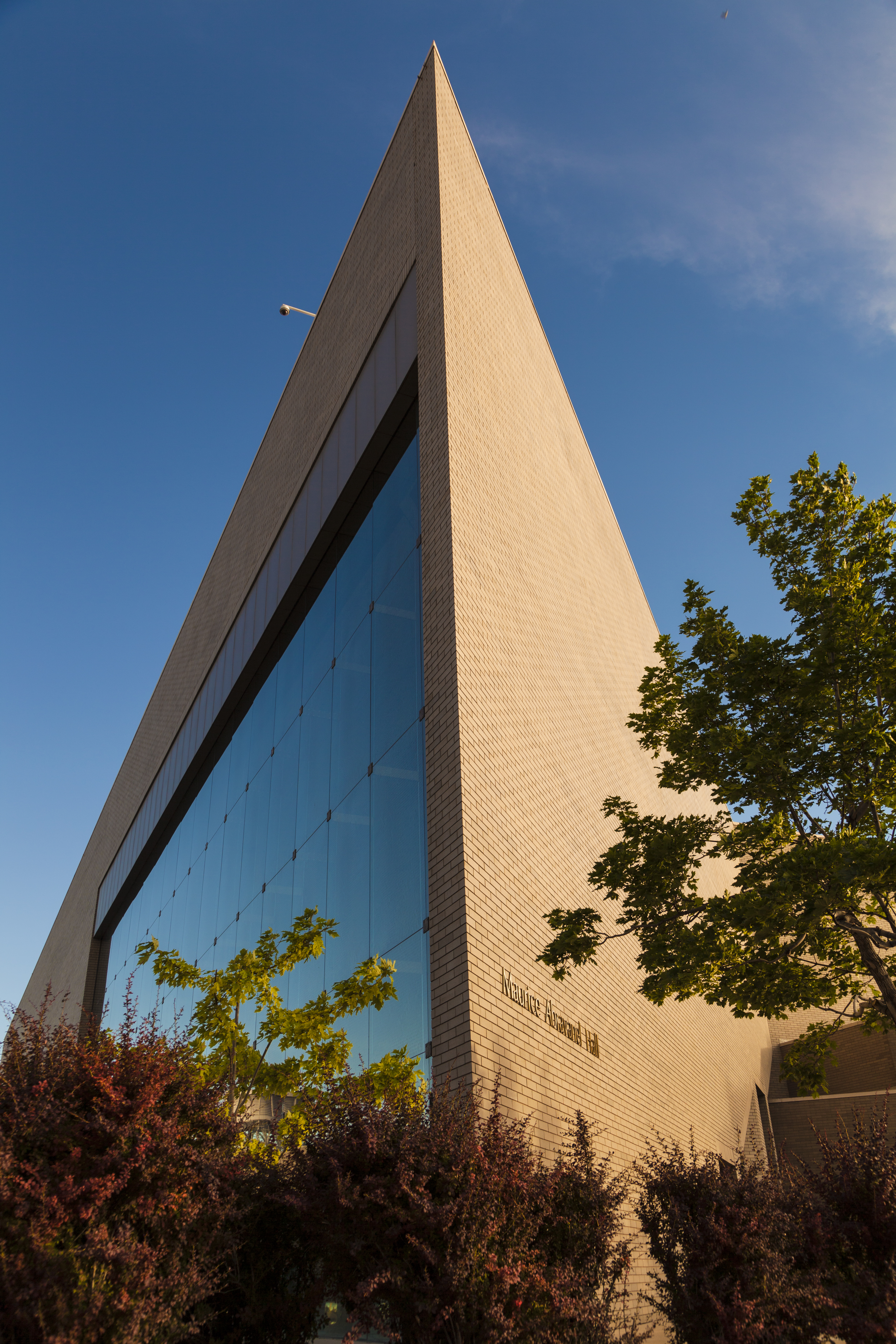
Abravanel Hall, home of the Utah Symphony

The Utah Symphony is an American orchestra based in Salt Lake City, Utah. The orchestra's principal venue is Abravanel Hall. In addition to its Salt Lake City subscription concerts, the orchestra travels around the Intermountain West serving communities throughout Utah. The orchestra accompanies the Utah Opera in four productions per year at Salt Lake's Capitol Theatre. In addition, the Utah Symphony and Utah Opera have a summer residency at the Deer Valley Music Festival, located in Park City, Utah. The orchestra receives funding from the Utah State Legislature for educational concerts. The symphony has a division in Utah Valley that is based out of the Noorda Center for the Performing Arts at Utah Valley University in Orem, Utah.

== History ==
The first attempt to create a symphony orchestra in the Utah area occurred in 1892, four years before Utah achieved statehood. The Salt Lake Symphony (not to be confused with the modern Salt Lake Symphony) was created and presented just one concert before disbanding. In 1902, the Salt Lake Symphony Orchestra was formed, and it remained in existence until 1911. In 1913, the Salt Lake Philharmonic was formed, and it continued until 1925.

The organization of a symphony with "Utah" in its name started during the Great Depression as part of the Federal Music Project, an employment-assistance program which formed part of Federal Project Number One (which in turn was an arm of the Works Project Administration). The Project hired Reginald Beales to create a musical group in Utah. He formed the Utah State Sinfonietta with a core of 5 members. That group grew rapidly and toured extensively, presenting concerts throughout Utah.

By 1940, federal funding for arts projects had ceased, so local enthusiasts formed the Utah State Symphony Orchestra on April 4, 1940, with Fred E. Smith as president. They scheduled their first concert for May 8, 1940, and asked Hans Henriot to conduct it. The resulting concert was so successful that the group offered Henriot a contract to direct the orchestra. This ensemble grew to 52 part-time musicians.

In 1947, Maurice Abravanel became the orchestra's music director. He built the ensemble into a full-time orchestra and developed its wider national reputation. He recorded and toured extensively with the orchestra. Under Abravanel, the orchestra first recorded with Vanguard Records and then with Vox Records. including complete symphony cycles of Mahler and of Tchaikovsky, as well as works by Varese, Milhaud, Gottschalk, Honegger, and Satie. The Utah Symphony's recordings of Mahler's symphonies with Abravanel were the first complete cycle recorded by an American orchestra (Vanguard). Honors for Abravanel's Mahler recordings with the orchestra include the “Mahler Medal of Honor” from the Bruckner Society of America (1965) and the International Gustav Mahler Society award for “Best Mahler Recording” (Fifth Symphony, 1975). During Abravanel's tenure, the orchestra's music education program grew into one of the most extensive arts education programs in the region. Educational concerts were given on orchestra tours across the Intermountain West and at home in the Salt Lake Valley. Abravanel concluded his tenure as music director in 1979. That same year, it left its longtime home at the Mormon Tabernacle and moved into Symphony Hall (renamed Abravanel Hall in 1993), its first dedicated concert venue.

The orchestra's season grew to a year-round schedule by 1980. Successors to Abravanel included Varujan Kojian (1980–1983), Joseph Silverstein (1983–1998), and Keith Lockhart (1998–2009). Under Silverstein and Lockhart, the orchestra continued its commitment to contemporary American music. In July 2002, the governing boards of Utah Symphony and Utah Opera decided to consolidate both organizations, resulting in the formation of Utah Symphony | Utah Opera. At the time of the merger, it was one of only two merged symphony and opera companies in the United States.

In September 2009, Thierry Fischer became the orchestra's music director. Contemporary works commissioned by the orchestra during Fischer's tenure have included EOS (Goddess of the Dawn) by Augusta Read Thomas, the percussion concerto Switch by Andrew Norman, and Transcend by Zhou Tian, written in commemoration of the 150th anniversary of the completion of the Transcontinental Railroad. Fischer is currently contracted with the Utah Symphony through the 2021–2022 season. In May 2019, the orchestra announced that Fischer is to conclude his tenure as its music director at the end of his current contract, at the close of the 2021–2022 season. However, in the wake of the COVID-19 pandemic, in October 2020, the orchestra announced a change to the scheduled conclusion of Fischer's contract as its music director, through August 2023, to supersede the May 2019 announcement.

In January 2009, the orchestra named Gerald Steichen as its principal pops conductor. In 2017, Conner Gray Covington was appointed to the role of assistant conductor, and subsequently promoted to associate conductor. Covington remained with the orchestra until 2021. Benjamin Manis became the orchestra's next associate conductor for the 2022–2023 season. Matthew Straw held the title of assistant conductor for the 2023–2024 season. The current assistant conductor of the orchestra is Jessica Rivero Altarriba.

David Robertson first guest-conducted the orchestra in October 2020. He returned for an additional guest-conducting engagement in December 2021. In December 2022, the orchestra announced the appointment of Robertson as its first-ever creative partner, effective with the 2023–2024 season, with a contract of 3 years.

In December 2022, Markus Poschner first guest-conducted the orchestra. He returned for a subsequent guest-conducting appearance in November 2023. In November 2024, the Utah Symphony announced the appointment of Poschner as its next music director, effective with the 2027–2028 season. Poschner took the title of music director-designate with immediate effect.

In May 2024, Delyana Lazarova first guest-conducted the orchestra. In December 2024, the orchestra announced the appointment of Lazarova as its next principal guest conductor, the first female conductor to be named to the post, effective with the 2025–2026 season, with an initial contract of two seasons.

== Music Directors ==
- Hans Henriot (1940–1945)
- Werner Janssen (1946–1947)
- Maurice Abravanel (1947–1979)
- Varujan Kojian (1980–1983)
- Joseph Silverstein (1983–1998)
- Keith Lockhart (1998–2009)
- Thierry Fischer (2009–2023)
- Markus Poschner (designate, effective autumn 2027)
