= The Long Christmas Ride Home =

2003 one-act play by Paula Vogel

- Original language: English
- Written by: Paula Vogel
- Characters: Claire; Rebecca; Stephen; Father; Mother
- Genre: Drama

Premiere
- Date: May 16, 2003
- Place: Trinity Repertory Company

The Long Christmas Ride Home is a one-act play written by Paula Vogel. It dramatises a road trip by two parents and their three young children to visit grandparents for Christmas dinner, and the emotional turmoil that they undergo. A significant element of the production schema is a Western contemporary employment of bunraku.

== Production history ==
The play, under the direction of Oskar Eustis, premiered at Trinity Repertory Company in Providence, Rhode Island on May 16, 2003 as a co-production between Trinity Repertory Company and the Long Wharf Theatre. The play featured shamisen player Sumie Kaneko and puppets by Basil Twist.

The play opened off-Broadway in November 2003 at the Vineyard Theatre, directed by Mark Brokaw. The cast featured Will McCormack (Stephen), Catherine Kellner (Rebecca), Enid Graham (Claire), Mark Blum (Father) and Randy Graff (Mother). The Japanesque set was designed by Neil Patel, with costumes by Jess Goldstein and puppetry by Basil Twist This production received 2004 Lucille Lortel Award nominations for: Outstanding Play, Outstanding Director, Outstanding Sound Design, (David Van Tieghem), and won the 2004 Lucille Lortel Award, Outstanding Featured Actor, Will McCormack.

The play was presented at the Long Wharf Theatre (New Haven, Connecticut) in January and February 2004, directed by Oskar Eustis with the cast that featured Chelsea Altman, Angela Brazil, Timothy Crowe, Julio Monge, Anne Scurria and Stephen Thorne.

It has subsequently appeared throughout the United States in both university, regional, and Off-Broadway productions. Notable productions include those at the Studio Theatre (Washington, D.C.). Many of these productions have honored Vogel's assertion that the play, while partly about Christmas, is not meant as a seasonal "Christmas play" (unlike, for example, adaptations of Charles Dickens' A Christmas Carol). Therefore, like the world and New York City premieres, many productions are presented during what Vogel terms "the before and aftermath" of the holiday season (e.g., October, January).

== Characterization ==
While the characters of the mother, father, and children (in adulthood) are portrayed by human performers, the children (in youth) are portrayed by puppeteers and initially voiced by narrators. Vogel bases the presence of puppets on what she claims is "one Westerner's misunderstanding of bunraku," the centuries-old form of Japanese puppetry. (Vogel does, however, write that other styles of puppets would be acceptable, so long as the children-puppets do not become "cute or coy.") Vogel indicates the play's flexibility in regard to the use and number of puppeteers. Some productions, including the world premiere, utilize three-person bunraku teams to manipulate the puppets: an omozukai controls the right hand of the puppet, a hidarizukai controls the left hand of the puppet, and an ashizukai controls the feet. Other productions, sometimes responding to the economic considerations of hiring additional performers, have used a single puppeteer for each child puppet (though this makes it impossible to use traditional bunraku puppets). Regardless of the type of puppeteering arrangement employed, the chief (or in some cases, sole) puppeteer will later assume the role of the child as an adult.

Both the 2003 world premiere at the Trinity Repertory Company and subsequent 2004 production at the Long Wharf Theatre featured bunraku puppets created by Basil Twist, a New York-based puppeteer.

The traditional bunraku function of the Japanese tayū (or chanter), who, among other narrative tasks, performs a puppet character's utterances, is fulfilled by the Man or Woman narrator at the beginning of the journey and then by a puppeteer (one per child character) in the latter part of the journey. In so doing, Vogel is able to continue the traditional tayū's fluctuation between first-person and second-person address.

The Man and Woman, who begin the play as omniscient narrators, soon assume the roles of the mother and father during the journey. These two performers initially speak all stage dialogue, including the lines of the children and some stage directions. Gradually, the three actors who begin the play as the chief puppeteers of the three children begin to speak the children's lines, relegating the Man and Woman to roles as the parents and occasional narrators. The human actors speaking the children's lines during the opening automobile journey abandon the puppets in the latter portion of the play to fully embody the adult characters during lengthy monologues.

== Music and sound ==
Acknowledging the continual presence of music in traditional bunraku, Vogel has indicated her preference that "music and sound effects run under the entire play." Many productions make great use of traditional Japanese music by shamisen players, though Vogel states that aural effects as varied as a boom box, Western Christmas carols "tuned to the tonal scales of bunraku," wooden clappers, or Hawaiian guitars are acceptable. The music for the Off-Broadway premiere production in 2003 was performed live by Luke Notary.

== Scenic design ==
Vogel intends the work to be played on a "simple, elegant, bare" set: stools, benches, and simple chairs. Such minimalism will, she hopes, "allow the action [to] flow as much as possible." Real stage properties (e.g., an actual umbrella) should be used only "when absolutely necessary." Most major productions have adopted Vogel's suggested scenic design.

== Reception ==
Productions of The Long Christmas Ride Home have been generally well received by most reviewers. The New York Times, though bemoaning a "lag" in action as the adult children monologues appear in the latter portion of the play, nonetheless determined the work "is as pure as mathematics in its translation of the prosaic into the abstract. At its most touching, the play collapses time and space into moments of disarming, and affecting, beauty."

The CurtainUp reviewer wrote: "...In deconstructing one family's image of American as apple pie togetherness on the ultimate family holiday, Vogel returns to the central prop d [sic] of How I Learned to Drive and the painful memories of her brother's death from AIDS explored in The Baltimore Waltz. It is also the outgrowth of her interest in fostering experimental theatrical techniques and acknowledging the roots of that experimental spirit. "

Critics have compared the work to fellow Pulitzer Prize-winner Thorton Wilder's own automobile journey one-act play, The Happy Journey to Trenton and Camden. Vogel confirms this association as purposeful, labeling her own Christmas work an "homage" to Wilder's "great gift to the American theatre [of] presentational, rather than representational theatre."
