= Robert Wierzel =

American lighting designer (born 1956)

Robert Wierzel (born July 1, 1956) is an American lighting designer. He has worked with artists, designers and directors in theater. He works on contemporary music, and dance.
