= Joseph Colaneri =

American conductor

Joseph Colaneri is an American conductor.

== Career ==
From 1987 to 1998, he was a conductor with the New York City Opera. He conducted 52 performances at the Metropolitan Opera between 2000 and 2018. He was the artistic director of the opera program at the Mannes School of Music for 20 years.

In 1993, Colaneri conducted the world premiere of Hugo Weisgall's opera Esther at the New York City Opera. In 1995, he led the American premiere of Toshiro Mayuzumi's 1976 opera Kinkaku-ji at the same venue.

West Australian Opera announced in January 2012 that Colaneri would take up the position of artistic director of the company, succeeding Richard Mills, who moved to Victorian Opera after holding that position for 15 years. In 2014, Colaneri announced that he would not renew his contract. In 2013, the Glimmerglass Festival, an opera and theater company in Cooperstown, New York, announced that Colaneri has been named its new music director. In 2017, he made his Juilliard Orchestra debut.
