= Robert Lee Fowler =

American politician

Member of the U.S. House of Representatives from Missouri's 69th, 80th district

Missouri House of Representatives

Personal details
- Born: 1926 Livonia, Missouri
- Died: 2004 (aged 77–78) Columbia, Missouri
- Resting place: Riverview Cemetery in Jefferson City, Missouri
- Party: Democratic
- Spouse(s): Martha Proctor (1953-?); Marian H. Luadzers Clickner (1990-2004)
- Children: 2 (1 son, 1 daughter)
- Occupation: salesman, pipe fitter

Robert Lee Fowler (October 26, 1926 - March 5, 2004) was a Democratic politician who served in the Missouri House of Representatives in the 1970s and 1980s, as mayor and councilman of Berkeley, Missouri, and as county clerk for St. Louis County. He also served in the U.S. Army and was honorably discharged in 1947. Fowler was born in Livonia, Missouri, and was educated in Missouri public schools. On June 6, 1953, he married Martha Proctor; he was later married to Marian H. Luadzers Clickner from 1990 until his death in 2004.
