= Gerald Steichen =

Gerald Steichen (born 1963 in Tonkawa, Oklahoma) is an American music conductor, pianist and stage actor.

Steichen holds music degrees from Oklahoma City University and from the University of Southern California, Los Angeles. He has conducted symphony orchestras, opera, acted in Broadway plays, and conducted opera touring companies (including the U.S. tour of The Phantom of the Opera). He conducted the final public Broadway performance of Cats. He has presented piano concertos and served as an on-stage pianist for New York City Opera presentations.

== Conducting engagements ==
Steichen has held the following posts:

- Anchorage Opera - Principal guest conductor
- New York City Opera - member of the music/conducting staff
- The Ridgefield Symphony Orchestra - music director
- Opera East Texas - conductor and artistic director
- Utah Symphony Orchestra - principal pops conductor (beginning September 2009)
- New Haven Symphony Orchestra - associate conductor
