= Paula Vogel =

American playwright (born 1951)

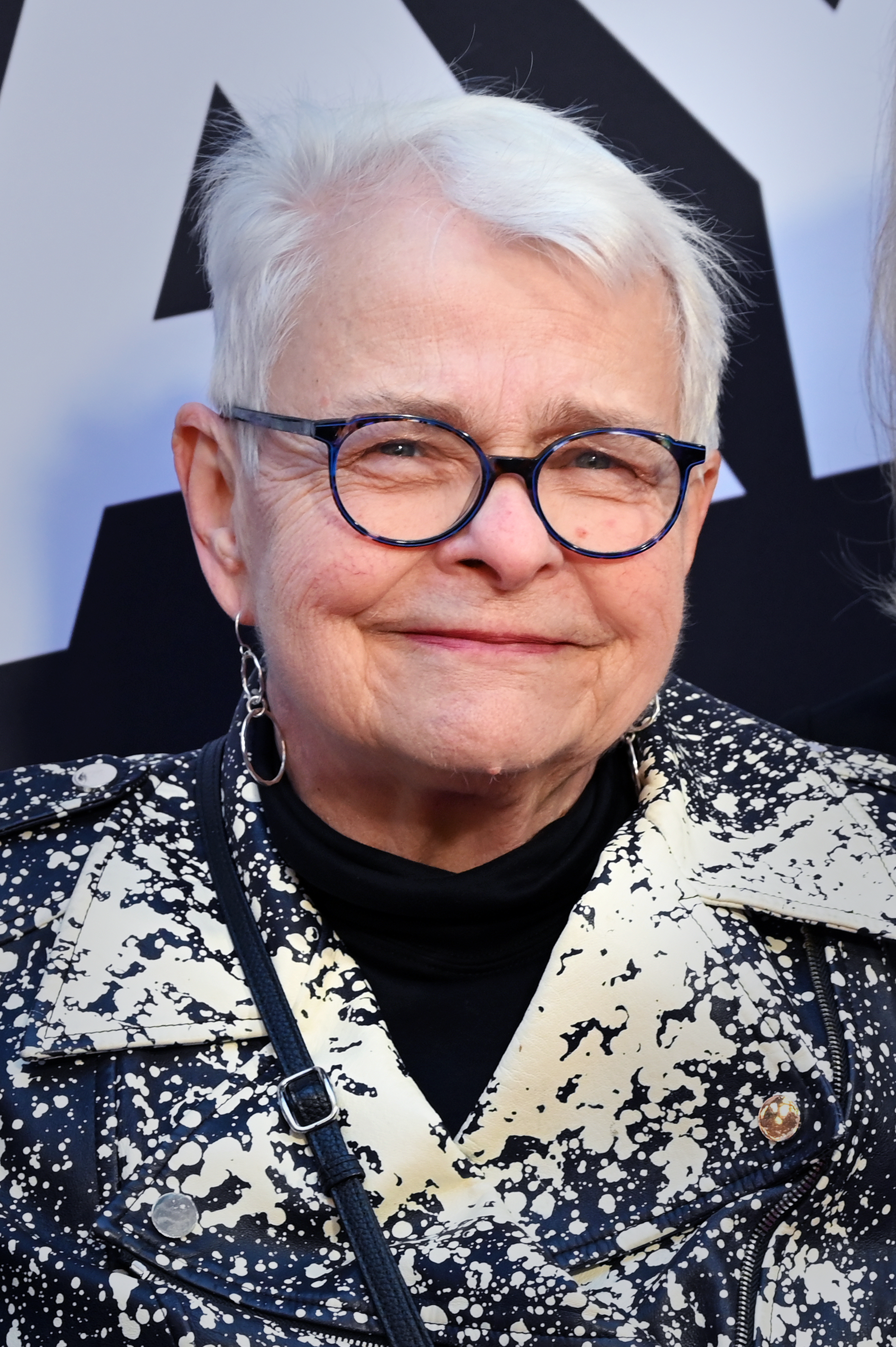
- Vogel in 2025
- Born: November 16, 1951 (age 74); Washington, D.C., U.S.
- Education: Bryn Mawr College; Catholic University (BA); Cornell University (MA, PhD)
- Occupations: Playwright, professor
- Spouse: Anne Fausto-Sterling (m. 2004)
- Writing career
- Notable awards: Pulitzer Prize for Drama (1998)

Paula Vogel (born November 16, 1951) is an American playwright. She is known for her provocative explorations of complex social and political issues. Much of her work delves into themes of psychological trauma, abuse, and the complexities of human relationships. She has received the Pulitzer Prize as well as nominations for two Tony Awards. In 2013 she was inducted into the American Theater Hall of Fame.

Vogel's off-Broadway play How I Learned to Drive earned her the 1998 Pulitzer Prize for Drama. The play was revived on Broadway in 2022, earning her a Tony Award for Best Revival of a Play nomination. She wrote the Off-Broadway plays The Baltimore Waltz (1992), Hot 'N Throbbing (1994), The Mineola Twins (1996), and The Long Christmas Ride Home (2003). She made her Broadway debut with Indecent in 2017, which earned her a nomination for the Tony Award for Best Play. She returned to Broadway with her latest play Mother Play (2024).

A longtime teacher, Vogel spent the bulk of her academic career – from 1984 to 2008 – at Brown University, where she served as Adele Kellenberg Seaver Professor in Creative Writing, oversaw its playwriting program, and helped found the Brown/Trinity Rep Consortium. From 2008 to 2012, Vogel was Eugene O'Neill Professor of Playwriting and department chair at the Yale School of Drama, as well as playwright in residence at the Yale Repertory Theatre.

== Early life and education ==
Vogel was born in Washington, D.C., to Donald Stephen Vogel, an advertising executive, and Phyllis Rita (Bremerman), a secretary for the United States Postal Service Training and Development Center. Her father was Jewish, whereas her mother was Roman Catholic. She attended Bryn Mawr College from 1969 to 1970 and 1971 to 1972, and is a graduate of The Catholic University of America (BA, 1974) and Cornell University (MA, 1976; PhD, 2016).

== Career ==
=== 1992–2014: Early works and breakthrough ===
A productive playwright since the late 1970s, Vogel first came to national prominence with her AIDS-related seriocomedy The Baltimore Waltz, which won the Obie Award for Best Play in 1992. She is best known for her Pulitzer Prize-winning play How I Learned to Drive (1997), which examines the impact and echoes of child sexual abuse and incest. Other notable plays include Desdemona, A Play About A Handkerchief (1993), The Oldest Profession (1981), And Baby Makes Seven (1984), Hot 'N Throbbing (1994), and The Mineola Twins (1996).

Her play The Oldest Profession was first read in February 1981 at the Hudson Guild, New York City, directed by Gordon Edelstein. The play premiered in April 1988 at Theatre Network in Edmonton, Canada and 25th Street Theatre in Saskatoon, Canada, directed by Tom Bentley-Fisher. Subsequent productions include a reading at Brown University in April 1990 and a production by Company One in Hartford, Connecticut in October 1991. The play premiered Off-Broadway in September 2004 in a Signature Theatre Company production.

And Baby Makes Seven premiered Off-Broadway in April 1993, produced by the Circle Repertory Company at the Lucille Lortel Theatre. The cast featured Peter Frechette, Cherry Jones and Mary Mara. It was first produced by Theatre with Teeth, New York City, in January 1984, directed by Vogel. It was then produced at Theatre Rhinoceros, San Francisco, in February 1986, directed by Kris Gannon. Desdemona was first produced by the Bay Street Theatre Festival, Sag Harbor, New York in July 1993 and then was produced Off-Broadway by the Circle Repertory Company in November 1993. The productions starred J. Smith-Cameron as Desdemona and Cherry Jones as Bianca.

Second Stage Theatre produced How I Learned to Drive in February 2012, the first New York City production of the play in 15 years. A Civil War Christmas was presented Off-Broadway at the New York Theatre Workshop, from November 13, 2012, to December 30, 2012. The play was directed by Tina Landau and featured Alice Ripley and Bob Stillman. The play was nominated for the 2013 Lucille Lortel Award, Outstanding Director (Landau) and Outstanding Costume Design, (Toni-Leslie James) and won the Lortel Award for Outstanding Lighting Design (Scott Zielinski). Artists Repertory Theatre, located in Portland, Oregon, presented A Civil War Christmas: An American Musical Celebration, from November 22 to December 23, 2016.

=== 2015–present: Broadway debut ===
Vogel's first play with music, Indecent, co-created and directed by Rebecca Taichman, premiered at Yale Repertory Theatre on October 2, 2015, and then ran at La Jolla Playhouse (San Diego) in November 2015. Indecent was a finalist for the 2016 Edward M. Kennedy Prize for Drama.

The play premiered Off-Broadway at the Vineyard Theatre, running from April 27, 2016 (previews), officially on May 17, 2016, and closing on June 19, 2016. The play was nominated for the 2016 Lucille Lortel Award, Outstanding Play. Indecent premiered on Broadway at the Cort Theatre on April 4, 2017, in previews, and opened April 18. The Off-Broadway cast, featuring Adina Verson and Katrina Lenk, reprised their roles in the Broadway production, with additional cast including Ben Cherry, Andrea Goss, and Eleanor Reissa. The play has music composed by Lisa Gutkin and Aaron Halva. The play is being produced by Vineyard Theatre in association with La Jolla Playhouse and Yale Repertory Theatre. This marks Vogel's Broadway debut. The play "is inspired by the real-life controversy surrounding the 1923 Broadway production of Sholem Asch's God of Vengeance, the love story of two women." Indecent was nominated for the 2017 Outer Critics Circle Awards: Outstanding New Broadway Play, Rebecca Taichman as Outstanding Director of a Play, Outstanding Lighting Design, Outstanding Projection Design (Tal Yarden), Outstanding Featured Actor In A Play (Richard Topol), and Outstanding Featured Actress In A Play (Katrina Lenk). The play was nominated for the 2017 Drama Desk Award, Outstanding Play and Outstanding Lighting Design for a Play (Christopher Akerlind).

Vogel premiered a new work titled Mother Play on Broadway as part of Second Stage Theater's 2023–2024 season.

== Style and themes ==
Although no particular theme or topic dominates her work, she often examines traditionally controversial issues such as sexual abuse and prostitution. Asserting that she "writes the play backwards," moving from emotional circumstances and character to craft narrative structure, Vogel says, "My writing isn't actually guided by issues.... I only write about things that directly impact my life." Vogel adds, "If people get upset, it's because the play is working." These issues appear in Vogel's Desdemona (1994), where the narrative of a brothel is used to give female characters agency, or "give back to Desdemona power to accompany her activity." Vogel's family, especially her late brother Carl Vogel, influences her writings. Vogel says, "In every play, there are a couple of places where I send a message to my late brother Carl. Just a little something in the atmosphere of every play to try and change the homophobia in our world." Carl's likeness appears in such plays as The Long Christmas Ride Home (2003), And Baby Makes Seven, and The Baltimore Waltz.

"Vogel tends to select sensitive, difficult, fraught issues to theatricalize," theatre theorist Jill Dolan comments, "and to spin them with a dramaturgy that's at once creative, highly imaginative, and brutally honest." Her work embraces theatrical devices from across several traditions, incorporating, in various works, direct address, bunraku puppetry, omniscient narration, and fantasy sequences. Critic David Finkel finds this breadth in Vogel's career to be reflective of a general tendency toward stylistic reinvention from work to work. "This playwright recoils at the notion of writing plays that are alike in their composition," Finkel writes. "She wants each play to be different in texture from those that have preceded it."

== Academic and teacher ==
Vogel, a renowned teacher of playwriting, counts among her former students Susan Smith Blackburn Prize-winner Bridget Carpenter, Obie Award-winner Adam Bock, MacArthur Fellow Sarah Ruhl, and Pulitzer Prize-winners Nilo Cruz, Lynn Nottage, Dand Quiara Alegría Hudes.

During her two decades leading the graduate playwriting program and new play festival at Brown University, Vogel helped develop a nationally recognized center for educational theatre, culminating in the creation of the Brown/Trinity Repertory Company Consortium with Oskar Eustis, then Trinity's artistic director, in 2002. She left Brown in 2008 to assume her positions as adjunct professor and the chair of the playwriting department at Yale School of Drama, which she held until 2012, and the Playwright-in-Residence at Yale Repertory Theatre. She is currently the Eugene O'Neill Professor (adjunct) of Playwriting at Yale School of Drama and playwright-in-residence at the Yale Repertory Theatre, as well as an artistic associate at Long Wharf Theatre. Vogel previously served as an instructor at Cornell University during her graduate work in the mid-1970s.

== Personal life ==
Vogel had two brothers: Carl, who died of AIDS in 1988, and Mark. Carl is eponym for the Carl Vogel Center in Washington, D.C., founded by their father Don Vogel. The center is a service provider for people living with HIV.

Vogel married Brown University professor and author Anne Fausto-Sterling in Truro, Massachusetts, on September 26, 2004.

== Theatrical works ==
As a playwright

Year	Title	Venue	Ref.
1984	And Baby Makes Seven	New York City	
1992	The Baltimore Waltz	Yale Repertory Theatre	
1993	Desdemona, A Play about a Handkerchief	Bay Street Theatre, Off-Broadway	
1994	Hot 'N Throbbing	American Repertory Theater	
1996	The Mineola Twins	Perseverance Theatre	
1997; 2022	How I Learned to Drive	Vineyard Theare, Off-Broadway; Samuel J. Friedman Theatre, Broadway	
2003	The Long Christmas Ride Home	Trinity Repertory Company	
2008	Civil War Christmas	Long Wharf Theatre, New Haven	
2014	Don Juan Comes Home from Iraq	Wilma Theater, Philadelphia	
2015; 2017	Indecent	Yale Repertory Theatre; Cort Theatre, Broadway	
2024	Mother Play	Helen Hayes Theater, Broadway	

== Awards and honors ==
Year	Association	Category	Nominated work	Result	Ref.
1995	Guggenheim Fellowship	Drama & Performance Art			
1998	Pulitzer Prize for Drama		How I Learned to Drive	Won	
1998	Drama Desk Award	Outstanding Play	How I Learned to Drive	Won	
2017	Drama Desk Award	Outstanding Play	Indecent	Nominated	
2017	Tony Award	Best Play	Indecent	Nominated	
2017	Obie Award	Lifetime Achievement		Honored	
2017	New York Drama Critics' Circle Award	Special Citation (for career achievement as a playwright and mentor)		Honored	
2022	Tony Award	Best Revival of a Play	How I Learned to Drive	Nominated	
2024	Tony Award	Best Play	Mother Play	Nominated	
2024	Drama Desk Award	Outstanding Play	Mother Play	Nominated	

Subsequent to her Obie Award for Best Play (1992) and Pulitzer Prize in Drama (1998), Vogel received the Award for Literature from The American Academy of Arts and Letters in 2004. She won a Robert Chesley Award in 1997. She won the 1998 Susan Smith Blackburn Prize for How I Learned to Drive. In 1999, Vogel received the PEN/Laura Pels International Foundation for Theater Award for a playwright in mid-career.

In 2003, the American College Theatre Festival created an annual Paula Vogel Award in Playwriting for "the best student-written play that celebrates diversity and encourages tolerance while exploring issues of dis-empowered voices not traditionally considered mainstream." In 2013, Vogel was inducted into the American Theater Hall of Fame.

In 2016, Vogel successfully completed and defended her doctoral thesis at Cornell University, more than 40 years after she began her graduate work. She was awarded her Ph.D. in Theatre Arts in May. Vogel received the 2017 Obie Award for Lifetime Achievement. Vogel is featured in the book 50 Key Figures in Queer US Theatre (2022), with a profile written by theatre scholar Sara Warner.

In 2015 Paula Vogel's literary archive was obtained by the Beinecke Rare Book and Manuscript Library at Yale University, and she became the first female playwright included in the library's Yale Collection of American Literature.

== Bibliography ==
- Swan Song of Sir Henry (1974)
- Meg (1977)
- Apple-Brown Betty (1979)
- Bertha in Blue (1981)
- The Oldest Profession (Hudson Guild, New York City reading, 1981)
