= Bigthan and Teresh =

Two eunuchs in service of the Persian king Ahasuerus, in the Book of Esther

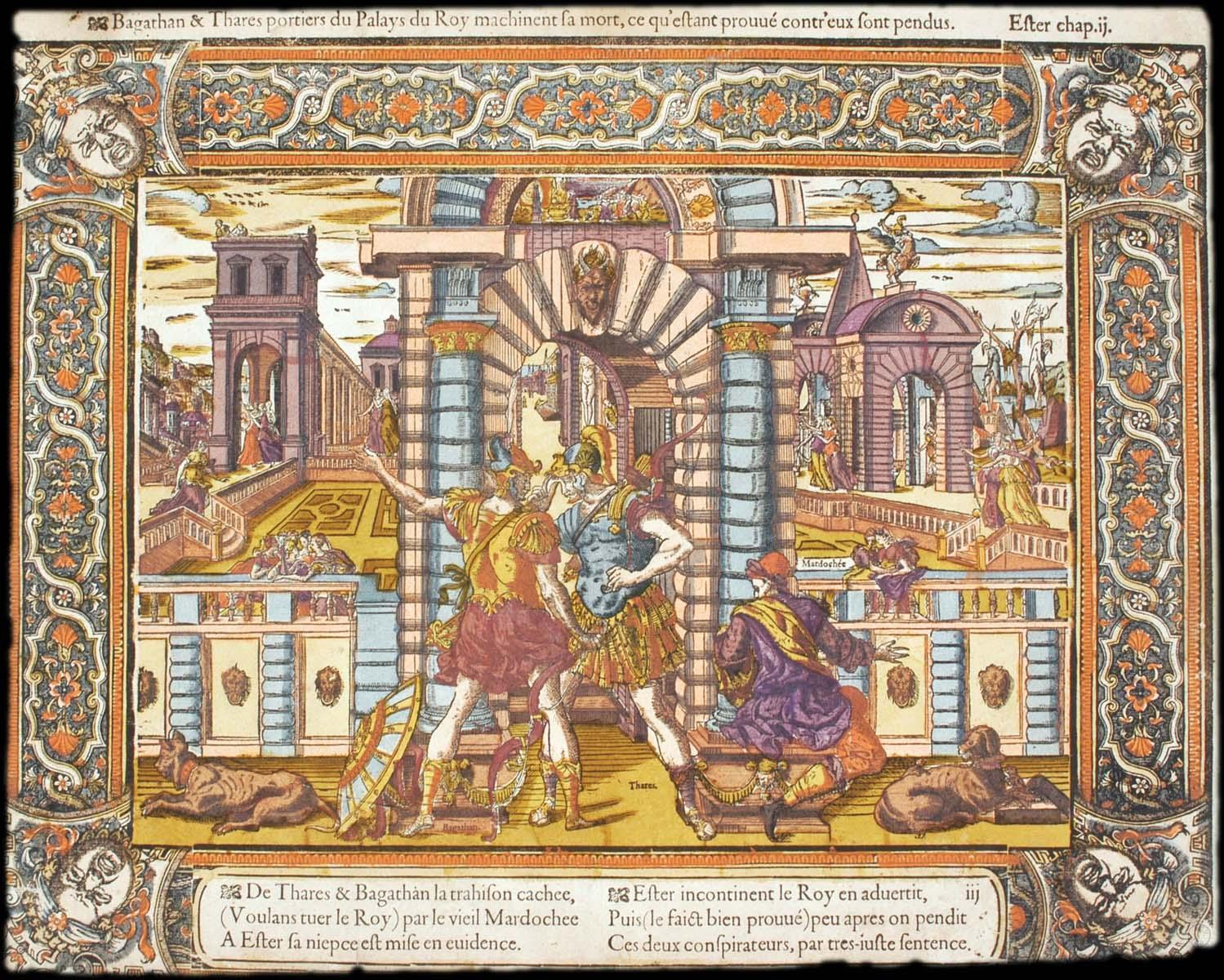
Depiction of Bigthan and Teresh by Antoine Caron.

Bigthan (Hebrew: בִּגְתָן, בִּגְתָנָא Bīgṯān, Bīgṯānāʾ) and Teresh (Hebrew: תֶרֶשׁ Ṯereš) were two eunuchs in service of the Persian king Ahasuerus, according to the chapter 2 of the Book of Esther. According to the deuterocanonical/apocryphal additions to the Book of Esther available in the Greek Septuagint translation of the Bible, they were known as Gabatha and Tharra (Koine Greek: Γαβαθά καὶ Θαρρα). Bigthan's name is also spelled "Bigtan" or "Bigthana". It is a Persian name which means "Gift of God".

== Narrative ==
Mordecai rested in the courtyard one day and overheard these two eunuchs plotting to kill the king. He went on to inform the king through Esther, thus thwarting the plot. The two conspirators were apprehended and hung on the gallows, and Mordecai's service to the king was recorded in the royal chronicles.
