= Tony Award for Best Scenic Design =

American theatre award

- Awarded for: Best Scenic Design
- Location: United States New York City
- Presented by: American Theatre Wing The Broadway League
- Currently held by: Eugene Lee for Wicked (2004)
- Website: TonyAwards.com

This is a list of winners and nominations for the Tony Award for Best Scenic Design for outstanding set design of a play or musical. The award was first presented in 1947. In 1960, 1961, and since 2005, the category was divided into Scenic Design in a Play and Scenic Design in a Musical with each genre receiving its own award.

== Winners and nominees ==
indicates the winner

=== 1940s ===
Year	Designer	Production
1947; 1st Tony Awards
1947; 1st Tony Awards	David Folkes	Henry VIII
1948; 2nd Tony Awards
1948; 2nd Tony Awards	Horace Armistead	The Medium
1949; 3rd Tony Awards
1949; 3rd Tony Awards	Jo Mielziner	Anne of the Thousand Days, Death of a Salesman, Sleepy Hollow, South Pacific and Summer and Smoke

=== 1950s ===
Year	Designer	Production
1950; 4th Tony Awards
1950; 4th Tony Awards	Jo Mielziner	The Innocents
1951; 5th Tony Awards
1951; 5th Tony Awards	Boris Aronson	The Country Girl, The Rose Tattoo and Season in the Sun
1952; 6th Tony Awards
1952; 6th Tony Awards	Jo Mielziner	The King and I
1953; 7th Tony Awards
1953; 7th Tony Awards	Raoul Penè Du Bois	Wonderful Town
1954; 8th Tony Awards
1954; 8th Tony Awards	Peter Larkin	Ondine and The Teahouse of the August Moon
1955; 9th Tony Awards
1955; 9th Tony Awards	Oliver Messel	House of Flowers
1956; 10th Tony Awards
1956; 10th Tony Awards	Peter Larkin	Inherit the Wind and No Time for Sergeants
1956; 10th Tony Awards	Boris Aronson	The Diary of Anne Frank, Bus Stop, Once Upon a Tailor and A View from the Bridge
1956; 10th Tony Awards	Ben Edwards	The Ponder Heart, Someone Waiting and The Honeys
1956; 10th Tony Awards	Jo Mielziner	Cat on a Hot Tin Roof, The Lark, Middle of the Night and Pipe Dream
1956; 10th Tony Awards	Raymond Sovey	The Great Sebastians
1957; 11th Tony Awards
1957; 11th Tony Awards	Oliver Smith	My Fair Lady
1957; 11th Tony Awards	Boris Aronson	A Hole in the Head and Small War on Murray Hill
1957; 11th Tony Awards	Ben Edwards	The Waltz of the Toreadors
1957; 11th Tony Awards	George Jenkins	The Happiest Millionaire and Too Late the Phalarope
1957; 11th Tony Awards	Donald Oenslager	Major Barbara
1957; 11th Tony Awards	Oliver Smith	A Clearing in the Woods, Candide, Auntie Mame, Eugenia and Visit to a Small Planet
1958; 12th Tony Awards
1958; 12th Tony Awards	Oliver Smith	West Side Story
1958; 12th Tony Awards	Boris Aronson	Orpheus Descending, A Hole in the Head and The Rope Dancers
1958; 12th Tony Awards	Ben Edwards	The Dark at the Top of the Stairs
1958; 12th Tony Awards	Peter Larkin	Blue Denim, Compulsion, Good as Gold and Miss Isobel
1958; 12th Tony Awards	Jo Mielziner	Look Homeward, Angel, Miss Lonelyhearts, The Square Root of Wonderful, Oh, Captain! and The Day the Money Stopped
1958; 12th Tony Awards	Oliver Smith	Brigadoon, Carousel, Jamaica, Nude with Violin and Time Remembered
1959; 13th Tony Awards
1959; 13th Tony Awards	Donald Oenslager	A Majority of One
1959; 13th Tony Awards	Boris Aronson	J.B.
1959; 13th Tony Awards	David R. Ballou	The Legend of Lizzie
1959; 13th Tony Awards	Ben Edwards	Jane Eyre
1959; 13th Tony Awards	Oliver Messel	Rashomon
1959; 13th Tony Awards	Teo Otto	The Visit

=== 1960s ===
Year	Designer	Production
1960 – 1961	—N/a	
1962; 16th Tony Awards
1962; 16th Tony Awards	Will Steven Armstrong	Carnival!
1962; 16th Tony Awards	David Hays	No Strings
1962; 16th Tony Awards	Oliver Smith	The Gay Life
1962; 16th Tony Awards	Rouben Ter-Arutunian	A Passage to India
1963; 17th Tony Awards
1963; 17th Tony Awards	Sean Kenny	Oliver!
1963; 17th Tony Awards	Will Steven Armstrong	Tchin-Tchin
1963; 17th Tony Awards	Anthony Powell	The School for Scandal
1963; 17th Tony Awards	Franco Zeffirelli	The Lady of the Camellias
1964; 18th Tony Awards
1964; 18th Tony Awards	Oliver Smith	Hello, Dolly!
1964; 18th Tony Awards	Raoul Penè Du Bois	The Student Gypsy
1964; 18th Tony Awards	Ben Edwards	The Ballad of the Sad Café
1964; 18th Tony Awards	David Hays	Marco Millions
1965; 19th Tony Awards
1965; 19th Tony Awards	Oliver Smith	Baker Street, Luv and The Odd Couple
1965; 19th Tony Awards	Boris Aronson	Fiddler on the Roof and Incident at Vichy
1965; 19th Tony Awards	Sean Kenny	The Roar of the Greasepaint – The Smell of the Crowd
1965; 19th Tony Awards	Beni Montresor	Do I Hear a Waltz?
1966; 20th Tony Awards
1966; 20th Tony Awards	Howard Bay	Man of La Mancha
1966; 20th Tony Awards	William and Jean Eckart	Mame
1966; 20th Tony Awards	David Hays	Drat! The Cat!
1966; 20th Tony Awards	Robert Randolph	Anya, Skyscraper and Sweet Charity
1967; 21st Tony Awards
1967; 21st Tony Awards	Boris Aronson	Cabaret
1967; 21st Tony Awards	John Bury	The Homecoming
1967; 21st Tony Awards	Oliver Smith	I Do! I Do!
1967; 21st Tony Awards	Alan Tagg	Black Comedy
1968; 22nd Tony Awards
1968; 22nd Tony Awards	Desmond Heeley	Rosencrantz and Guildenstern Are Dead
1968; 22nd Tony Awards	Boris Aronson	The Price
1968; 22nd Tony Awards	Robert Randolph	Golden Rainbow
1968; 22nd Tony Awards	Peter Wexler	The Happy Time
1969; 23rd Tony Awards
1969; 23rd Tony Awards	Boris Aronson	Zorba
1969; 23rd Tony Awards	Derek Cousins	Canterbury Tales
1969; 23rd Tony Awards	Jo Mielziner	1776
1969; 23rd Tony Awards	Oliver Smith	Dear World

=== 1970s ===
Year	Designer	Production
1970; 24th Tony Awards
1970; 24th Tony Awards	Jo Mielziner	Child's Play
1970; 24th Tony Awards	Howard Bay	Cry for Us All
1970; 24th Tony Awards	Ming Cho Lee	Billy
1970; 24th Tony Awards	Robert Randolph	Applause
1971; 25th Tony Awards
1971; 25th Tony Awards	Boris Aronson	Company
1971; 25th Tony Awards	John Bury	The Rothschilds
1971; 25th Tony Awards	Sally Jacobs	A Midsummer Night's Dream
1971; 25th Tony Awards	Jo Mielziner	Father's Day
1972; 26th Tony Awards
1972; 26th Tony Awards	Boris Aronson	Follies
1972; 26th Tony Awards	John Bury	Old Times
1972; 26th Tony Awards	Kert Lundell	Ain't Supposed to Die a Natural Death
1972; 26th Tony Awards	Robin Wagner	Jesus Christ Superstar
1973; 27th Tony Awards
1973; 27th Tony Awards	Tony Walton	Pippin
1973; 27th Tony Awards	Boris Aronson	A Little Night Music
1973; 27th Tony Awards	David Jenkins	The Changing Room
1973; 27th Tony Awards	Santo Loquasto	That Championship Season
1974; 28th Tony Awards
1974; 28th Tony Awards	Eugene Lee and Franne Lee	Candide
1974; 28th Tony Awards	John Conklin	The Au Pair Man
1974; 28th Tony Awards	Santo Loquasto	What the Wine-Sellers Buy
1974; 28th Tony Awards	Oliver Smith	Gigi
1974; 28th Tony Awards	Ed Wittstein	Ulysses in Nighttown
1975; 29th Tony Awards
1975; 29th Tony Awards	Carl Toms	Sherlock Holmes
1975; 29th Tony Awards	Scott Johnson	Dance With Me
1975; 29th Tony Awards	Tanya Moiseiwitsch	The Misanthrope
1975; 29th Tony Awards	William Ritman	God's Favorite
1975; 29th Tony Awards	Rouben Ter-Arutunian	Goodtime Charley
1975; 29th Tony Awards	Robin Wagner	Mack and Mabel
1976; 30th Tony Awards
1976; 30th Tony Awards	Boris Aronson	Pacific Overtures
1976; 30th Tony Awards	Ben Edwards	A Matter of Gravity
1976; 30th Tony Awards	David Mitchell	Trelawny of the 'Wells'
1976; 30th Tony Awards	Tony Walton	Chicago
1977; 31st Tony Awards
1977; 31st Tony Awards	David Mitchell	Annie
1977; 31st Tony Awards	Santo Loquasto	American Buffalo and The Cherry Orchard
1977; 31st Tony Awards	Robert Randolph	Porgy and Bess
1978; 32nd Tony Awards
1978; 32nd Tony Awards	Robin Wagner	On the Twentieth Century
1978; 32nd Tony Awards	Zack Brown	The Importance of Being Earnest
1978; 32nd Tony Awards	Edward Gorey	Dracula
1978; 32nd Tony Awards	David Mitchell	Working
1979; 33rd Tony Awards
1979; 33rd Tony Awards	Eugene Lee	Sweeney Todd: The Demon Barber of Fleet Street
1979; 33rd Tony Awards	Karl Eigsti	Knockout
1979; 33rd Tony Awards	David Jenkins	The Elephant Man
1979; 33rd Tony Awards	John Wulp	The Crucifer of Blood

=== 1980s ===
Year	Designer	Production
1980; 34th Tony Awards
1980; 34th Tony Awards	John Lee Beatty	Talley's Folly
1980; 34th Tony Awards	David Mitchell	Barnum
1980; 34th Tony Awards	Tazeena Firth and Timothy O'Brien	Evita
1980; 34th Tony Awards	Tony Walton	A Day in Hollywood / A Night in the Ukraine
1981; 35th Tony Awards
1981; 35th Tony Awards	John Bury	Amadeus
1981; 35th Tony Awards	John Lee Beatty	Fifth of July
1981; 35th Tony Awards	Santo Loquasto	The Suicide
1981; 35th Tony Awards	David Mitchell	Can-Can
1982; 36th Tony Awards
1982; 36th Tony Awards	Dermot Hayes and John Napier	The Life and Adventures of Nicholas Nickleby
1982; 36th Tony Awards	Ben Edwards	Medea
1982; 36th Tony Awards	Lawrence Miller	Nine
1982; 36th Tony Awards	Robin Wagner	Dreamgirls
1983; 37th Tony Awards
1983; 37th Tony Awards	Ming Cho Lee	K2
1983; 37th Tony Awards	John Gunter	All's Well That Ends Well
1983; 37th Tony Awards	David Mitchell	Foxfire
1983; 37th Tony Awards	John Napier	Cats
1984; 38th Tony Awards
1984; 38th Tony Awards	Tony Straiges	Sunday in the Park with George
1984; 38th Tony Awards	Clarke Dunham	End of the World
1984; 38th Tony Awards	Peter Larkin	The Rink
1984; 38th Tony Awards	Tony Walton	The Real Thing
1985; 39th Tony Awards
1985; 39th Tony Awards	Heidi Landesman	Big River
1985; 39th Tony Awards	Clarke Dunham	Grind
1985; 39th Tony Awards	Ralph Koltai	Much Ado About Nothing
1985; 39th Tony Awards	Voytek and Michael Levine	Strange Interlude
1986; 40th Tony Awards
1986; 40th Tony Awards	Tony Walton	The House of Blue Leaves
1986; 40th Tony Awards	Ben Edwards	The Iceman Cometh
1986; 40th Tony Awards	David Mitchell	The Boys in Winter
1986; 40th Tony Awards	Beni Montresor	The Marriage of Figaro
1987; 41st Tony Awards
1987; 41st Tony Awards	John Napier	Les Misérables
1987; 41st Tony Awards	Bob Crowley	Les Liaisons Dangereuses
1987; 41st Tony Awards	Martin Johns	Me and My Girl
1987; 41st Tony Awards	Tony Walton	The Front Page
1988; 42nd Tony Awards
1988; 42nd Tony Awards	Maria Björnson	The Phantom of the Opera
1988; 42nd Tony Awards	Eiko Ishioka	M. Butterfly
1988; 42nd Tony Awards	Tony Straiges	Into the Woods
1988; 42nd Tony Awards	Tony Walton	Anything Goes
1989; 43rd Tony Awards
1989; 43rd Tony Awards	Santo Loquasto	Cafe Crown
1989; 43rd Tony Awards	Thomas Lynch	The Heidi Chronicles
1989; 43rd Tony Awards	Héctor Orezzoli and Claudio Segovia	Black and Blue
1989; 43rd Tony Awards	Tony Walton	Lend Me a Tenor

=== 1990s ===
Year	Designer	Production
1990; 44th Tony Awards
1990; 44th Tony Awards	Robin Wagner	City of Angels
1990; 44th Tony Awards	Alexandra Byrne	Some Americans Abroad
1990; 44th Tony Awards	Kevin Rigdon	The Grapes of Wrath
1990; 44th Tony Awards	Tony Walton	Grand Hotel
1991; 45th Tony Awards
1991; 45th Tony Awards	Heidi Landesman	The Secret Garden
1991; 45th Tony Awards	Richard Hudson	La Bête
1991; 45th Tony Awards	John Napier	Miss Saigon
1991; 45th Tony Awards	Tony Walton	The Will Rogers Follies
1992; 46th Tony Awards
1992; 46th Tony Awards	Tony Walton	Guys and Dolls
1992; 46th Tony Awards	John Lee Beatty	A Small Family Business
1992; 46th Tony Awards	Joe Vaněk	Dancing at Lughnasa
1992; 46th Tony Awards	Robert Wagner	Jelly's Last Jam
1993; 47th Tony Awards
1993; 47th Tony Awards	John Arnone	The Who's Tommy
1993; 47th Tony Awards	John Lee Beatty	Redwood Curtain
1993; 47th Tony Awards	Jerome Sirlin	Kiss of the Spiderwoman
1993; 47th Tony Awards	Robin Wagner	Angels in America: Millennium Approaches
1994; 48th Tony Awards
1994; 48th Tony Awards	Bob Crowley	Carousel
1994; 48th Tony Awards	Peter Davidson	Medea
1994; 48th Tony Awards	Ian MacNeil	An Inspector Calls
1994; 48th Tony Awards	Tony Walton	She Loves Me
1995; 49th Tony Awards
1995; 49th Tony Awards	John Napier	Sunset Boulevard
1995; 49th Tony Awards	John Lee Beatty	The Heiress
1995; 49th Tony Awards	Stephen Brimson Lewis	Indiscretions
1995; 49th Tony Awards	Mark Thompson	Arcadia
1996; 50th Tony Awards
1996; 50th Tony Awards	Brian Thomson	The King and I
1996; 50th Tony Awards	John Lee Beatty	A Delicate Balance
1996; 50th Tony Awards	Scott Bradley	Seven Guitars
1996; 50th Tony Awards	Anthony Ward	A Midsummer Night's Dream
1997; 51st Tony Awards
1997; 51st Tony Awards	Stewart Laing	Titanic
1997; 51st Tony Awards	John Lee Beatty	The Little Foxes
1997; 51st Tony Awards	G.W. Mercier and Julie Taymor	Juan Darién
1997; 51st Tony Awards	Tony Walton	Steel Pier
1998; 52nd Tony Awards
1998; 52nd Tony Awards	Richard Hudson	The Lion King
1998; 52nd Tony Awards	Bob Crowley	The Capeman
1998; 52nd Tony Awards	Eugene Lee	Ragtime
1998; 52nd Tony Awards	Brothers Quay	The Chairs
1999; 53rd Tony Awards
1999; 53rd Tony Awards	Richard Hoover	Not About Nightingales
1999; 53rd Tony Awards	Bob Crowley	The Iceman Cometh
1999; 53rd Tony Awards	Bob Crowley	Twelfth Night
1999; 53rd Tony Awards	Ricardo Hernández	Parade

=== 2000s ===
Year	Designer	Production
2000; 54th Tony Awards
2000; 54th Tony Awards	Bob Crowley	Aida
2000; 54th Tony Awards	Thomas Lynch	The Music Man
2000; 54th Tony Awards	Robin Wagner	Kiss Me, Kate
2000; 54th Tony Awards	Tony Walton	Uncle Vanya
2001; 55th Tony Awards
2001; 55th Tony Awards	Robin Wagner	The Producers
2001; 55th Tony Awards	Bob Crowley	The Invention of Love
2001; 55th Tony Awards	Heidi Ettinger	The Adventures of Tom Sawyer
2001; 55th Tony Awards	Douglas Schmidt	42nd Street
2002; 56th Tony Awards
2002; 56th Tony Awards	Tim Hatley	Private Lives
2002; 56th Tony Awards	John Lee Beatty	Morning's at Seven
2002; 56th Tony Awards	Daniel Ostling	Metamorphoses
2002; 56th Tony Awards	Douglas Schmidt	Into the Woods
2003; 57th Tony Awards
2003; 57th Tony Awards	Catherine Martin	La bohème
2003; 57th Tony Awards	John Lee Beatty	Dinner at Eight
2003; 57th Tony Awards	Santo Loquasto	Long Day's Journey into Night
2003; 57th Tony Awards	David Rockwell	Hairspray
2004; 58th Tony Awards
2004; 58th Tony Awards	Eugene Lee	Wicked
2004; 58th Tony Awards	Robert Brill	Assassins
2004; 58th Tony Awards	Ralph Funicello	Henry IV, Part 1 and Part 2
2004; 58th Tony Awards	Tom Pye	Fiddler on the Roof

== Award Records ==
=== Multiple wins ===
7 Wins

- Oliver Smith

6 Wins

- Boris Aronson
- Bob Crowley

4 Wins

- Peter Larkin
- Jo Mielziner

3 Wins

- Eugene Lee
- John Napier
- Robin Wagner
- Tony Walton

2 Wins

- John Lee Beatty
- Heidi Landesman
- David Mitchell

=== Multiple nominations ===
14 Nominations

- Tony Walton

13 Nominations

- Boris Aronson

10 Nominations

- Oliver Smith

9 Nominations

- John Lee Beatty
- 8 Nominations
- Jo Mielziner
- Robin Wagner
- Ben Edwards

7 Nominations

- Bob Crowley
- David Mitchell

6 Nominations

- Santo Loquasto

5 Nominations

- John Napier

4 Nominations

- Peter Larkin
- Eugene Lee
- Robert Randolph
- John Bury

3 Nominations

- Heidi Landesman
- David Hays

2 Nominations

- Howard Bay
- Raoul Penè Du Bois
- Oliver Messel
- Donald Oenslager
- Will Steven Armstrong
- Rouben Ter-Arutunian
- Beni Montresor
- Ming Cho Lee
- Tony Straiges
- Clarke Dunham
- Thomas Lynch
- Richard Hudson
- Douglas Schmidt

== See also ==
- Tony Award for Best Scenic Design in a Musical
- Tony Award for Best Scenic Design in a Play
- Drama Desk Award for Outstanding Set Design
- Laurence Olivier Award for Best Set Design
- List of Tony Award-nominated productions
