= Drama Desk Award for Outstanding Set Design =

New York theater awards

- Awarded for: Outstanding Set Design
- Location: New York City
- Country: United States
- Presented by: Drama Desk
- First award: 1969
- Final award: 2015
- Website: dramadesk.org (defunct)

The Drama Desk Award for Outstanding Set Design was an annual award presented by Drama Desk in recognition of achievements in the theatre across collective Broadway, off-Broadway and off-off-Broadway productions in New York City. The award was first presented in 1969, for work in either a play or musical production. It was retired after the 1997 ceremony, replaced by separate play and musical categories, but returned as a singular category starting in 2010. It was permanently retired after the 2015 presentation, again replaced by separate play and musical categories.

Boris Aronson and Robin Wagner hold the record for most wins in the category before its retirement, with four wins each, followed closely by Santo Loquasto with three wins. Loquasto also holds the record for most nominations with eleven, followed by Tony Walton with nine.

== Winners and nominees ==
Key

and bold indicates the winner.

=== 1960s ===
| Year | Designer | Production |
1969
| 1969 | **Boris Aronson** | **Zorba** |
| 1969 | **Ming Cho Lee** | **Billy** |

=== 1970s ===
| Year | Designer | Production |
1970
| 1970 | **Boris Aronson** | **Company** |
| 1970 | **Jo Mielziner** | **Child's Play** |
| 1970 | **Fred Voelpe** | **The Memory Bank** |
1971
| 1971 | **Boris Aronson** | **Follies** |
| 1971 | **Sally Jacobs** | **A Midsummer Night's Dream** |
| 1971 | **Robin Wagner** | **Lenny** |
1972
| 1972 | **Santo Loquasto** | **Sticks and Bones** |
| 1972 | **Santo Loquasto** | **That Championship Season** |
| 1972 | **Kert Lundell** | **Ain't Supposed to Die a Natural Death** |
| 1972 | **Robert U. Taylor** | **The Beggar's Opera** |
1973
| 1973 | **Victor Garcia and Fabian Puigserver** | **Yerma** |
| 1973 | **David Jenkins** | **The Changing Room** |
| 1973 | **Tony Walton** | **Pippin** |
| 1973 | **Tony Walton** | **Shelter** |
1974
| 1974 | **Franne Lee and Eugene Lee** | **Candide** |
| 1974 | **David Mitchell** | **Short Eyes** |
| 1974 | **Douglas W. Schmidt** | **Over Here!** |
| 1974 | **Douglas W. Schmidt** | **Veronica's Room** |
1975
| 1975 | **Carl Toms** | **Sherlock Holmes** |
| 1975 | John Conklin | Cat on a Hot Tin Roof |
| 1975 | Tom H. John | The Wiz |
| 1975 | Scott Johnson | Dance with Me |
| 1975 | John Napier | Equus |
| 1975 | Julia Trevelyan Oman | Brief Lives |
| 1975 | William Ritman | God's Favorite |
| 1975 | Franco Zeffirelli | Saturday Sunday Monday |
1976
| 1976 | **Boris Aronson** | **Pacific Overtures** |
| 1976 | John Lee Beatty | Knock Knock |
| 1976 | Santo Loquasto | Kennedy's Children |
| 1976 | Santo Loquasto | Legend |
| 1976 | Robert U. Taylor | Lamppost Reunion |
| 1976 | James Tilton | A Memory of Two Mondays / 27 Wagons Full of Cotton |
| 1976 | James Tilton | They Knew What They Wanted |
1977
| 1977 | **Santo Loquasto** | **American Buffalo** |
| 1977 | **Santo Loquasto** | **The Cherry Orchard** |
| 1977 | John Lee Beatty | The Innocents |
| 1977 | Clarke Dunham | Hagar's Children |
| 1977 | George C. Jenkins | Sly Fox |
| 1977 | Robert Randolph | Porgy and Bess |
| 1977 | Douglas W. Schmidt | The Crazy Locomotive |
| 1977 | Douglas W. Schmidt | The Robber Bridegroom |
1978
| 1978 | **Robin Wagner** | **On the Twentieth Century** |
| 1978 | Edward Gorey | Dracula |
| 1978 | Judie Juracek | P.S. Your Cat Is Dead |
| 1978 | Santo Loquasto | The Play's the Thing |
| 1978 | David Mitchell | The Gin Game |
| 1978 | William Ritman | Deathtrap |
1979
| 1979 | **John Wulp** | **The Crucifer of Blood** |
| 1979 | Wilford Leach | All's Well That Ends Well |
| 1979 | Eugene Lee | Sweeney Todd: The Demon Barber of Fleet Street |
| 1979 | Santo Loquasto | King of Hearts |
| 1979 | Steven Rubin | On Golden Pond |

=== 1980s ===
| Year | Designer | Production |
1980
| 1980 | **John Lee Beatty** | **Talley's Folly** |
| 1980 | David Jenkins | The Art of Dining |
| 1980 | David Jenkins | I Ought to Be in Pictures |
| 1980 | David Mitchell | Barnum |
| 1980 | William Ritman | Morning's at Seven |
| 1980 | Douglas W. Schmidt | Sidewalkin' |
1981
| 1981 | **John Lee Beatty** | **Fifth of July** |
| 1981 | John Bury | Amadeus |
| 1981 | Wilford Leach and Bob Shaw | The Pirates of Penzance |
| 1981 | Douglas W. Schmidt | Frankenstein |
1982
| 1982 | **Robin Wagner** | **Dreamgirls** |
| 1982 | David Chapman | The First |
| 1982 | Laurie Dennett | The Dresser |
| 1982 | Eugene Lee | The Hothouse |
| 1982 | Santo Loquasto | Crossing Niagara |
| 1982 | Santo Loquasto | Gardenia |
| 1982 | Stuart Wurtzel | Henry IV |
1983
| 1983 | **Ming Cho Lee** | **K2** |
| 1983 | John Gunter | All's Well That Ends Well |
| 1983 | Andrew Jackness | Geniuses |
| 1983 | Andrew Jackness | Whodunnit |
| 1983 | Marjorie Bradley Kellogg | Extremities |
| 1983 | Marjorie Bradley Kellogg | Present Laughter |
| 1983 | Marjorie Bradley Kellogg | Steaming |
| 1983 | Kert Lundell | Johnny Got His Gun |
| 1983 | Douglas W. Schmidt | Death of Von Richthofen Witnessed from Earth |
1984
| 1984 | **Tony Straiges** | **Sunday in the Park with George** |
| 1984 | Michael Annals | Noises Off |
| 1984 | Peter Larkin | The Rink |
| 1984 | David Potts | Full Hookup |
| 1984 | Bill Stabile | Spookhouse |
| 1984 | Tony Walton | The Real Thing |
1985
| 1985 | **Heidi Ettinger** | **Big River** |
| 1985 | John Lee Beatty | The Octette Bridge Club |
| 1985 | Clarke Dunham | Grind |
| 1985 | James Leonard Joy | Digby |
| 1985 | Marjorie Bradley Kellogg | Requiem for a Heavyweight |
| 1985 | Ralph Koltai | Much Ado About Nothing |
| 1985 | Kevin Rigdon | Balm in Gilead |
1986
| 1986 | **Tony Walton** | **Social Security** |
| 1986 | **Tony Walton** | **The House of Blue Leaves** |
| 1986 | William Barclay | Goblin Market |
| 1986 | Ming Cho Lee | Execution of Justice |
| 1986 | Thomas Lynch | Little Footsteps |
| 1986 | Bob Shaw | Hamlet |
| 1986 | Bob Shaw | The Mystery of Edwin Drood |
1987
| 1987 | **John Napier** | **Les Misérables** |
| 1987 | **John Napier** | **Starlight Express** |
| 1987 | Bob Crowley | Les Liaisons Dangereuses |
| 1987 | Edward Gianfrancesco | North Shore Fish |
| 1987 | John Gunter | Wild Honey |
| 1987 | Martin Johns | Me and My Girl |
| 1987 | Tony Walton | The Front Page |
1988
| 1988 | **Maria Björnson** | **The Phantom of the Opera** |
| 1988 | Scott Bradley | Joe Turner's Come and Gone |
| 1988 | Eiko Ishioka | M. Butterfly |
| 1988 | Tony Straiges | Into the Woods |
| 1988 | Tony Walton | Anything Goes |
1989
| 1989 | **Santo Loquasto** | **Italian American Reconciliation** |
| 1989 | **Santo Loquasto** | **Café Crown** |
| 1989 | Loy Arcenas | Reckless |
| 1989 | John Lee Beatty | Aristocrats |
| 1989 | Thomas Lynch | The Heidi Chronicles |
| 1989 | James Morgan | Sweeney Todd: The Demon Barber of Fleet Street |
| 1989 | Tony Walton | Lend Me a Tenor |

=== 1990s ===
| Year | Designer | Production |
1990
| 1990 | **Robin Wagner** | **City of Angels** |
| 1990 | Edward Gianfrancesco | The Widow's Blind Date |
| 1990 | Kevin Rigdon | The Grapes of Wrath |
| 1990 | Tony Walton | Grand Hotel |
1991
| 1991 | **Heidi Ettinger** | **The Secret Garden** |
| 1991 | David Gallo | Machinal |
| 1991 | Richard Hudson | La Bête |
| 1991 | Andrew Jackness | Road to Nirvana |
1992
| 1992 | **Tony Walton** | **Guys and Dolls** |
| 1992 | John Conklin | 'Tis Pity She's a Whore |
| 1992 | Joe Vanek | Dancing at Lughnasa |
| 1992 | Robin Wagner | Crazy for You |
| 1992 | James Youmans | Bella, Belle of Byelorussia |
1993
| 1993 | **John Arnone** and **Wendall K. Harrington** | **The Who's Tommy** |
| 1993 | Mark Beard | Brother Truckers |
| 1993 | Heidi Ettinger | One Shoe Off |
| 1993 | Guy-Claude Francois | Les Atrides |
| 1993 | Jerome Sirlin | Kiss of the Spider Woman |
1994
| 1994 | **Ian MacNeil** | **An Inspector Calls** |
| 1994 | Bob Crowley | Carousel |
| 1994 | Peter J. Davison | Medea |
| 1994 | Marina Draghici | The Lights |
| 1994 | Adrianne Lobel | Passion |
| 1994 | George Tsypin | In the Summer House |
1995
| 1995 | **Eugene Lee** | **Show Boat** |
| 1995 | Bob Crowley | Hapgood |
| 1995 | Stephen Brimson Lewis | Indiscretions |
| 1995 | Santo Loquasto | A Month in the Country |
| 1995 | Mark Thompson | Arcadia |
| 1995 | James Youmans | The Petrified Prince |

=== 2010s ===
| Year | Designer | Production |
2010
| 2010 | **Phelim McDermott, Julian Crouch and Basil Twist** | **The Addams Family** |
| 2010 | Sandra Goldmark | The Boys in the Band |
| 2010 | Derek McLane | Ragtime |
| 2010 | Christopher Oram | Red |
| 2010 | Jay Rohloff | Underground |
| 2010 | Karen Tennent | Hansel and Gretel |
2011
| 2011 | **Derek McLane** | **Anything Goes** |
| 2011 | Rachel Hauck | Orange, Hat & Grace |
| 2011 | David Korins and Zachary Borovay | Lombardi |
| 2011 | Derek McLane | Bengal Tiger at the Baghdad Zoo |
| 2011 | Tony Straiges | Treasure Island |
| 2011 | Mark Wendland | The Merchant of Venice |
2012
| 2012 | **Jon Driscoll, Rob Howell and Paul Kieve** | **Ghost the Musical** |
| 2012 | David Gallo | The Mountaintop |
| 2012 | Roger Hanna | A Little Journey |
| 2012 | David Korins | Assistance |
| 2012 | David Korins | Chinglish |
| 2012 | Derek McLane | Follies |
2013
| 2013 | **Rob Howell** | **Matilda the Musical** |
| 2013 | Mimi Lien | The Whale |
| 2013 | Santo Loquasto | The Assembled Parties |
| 2013 | Anna Louizos | The Mystery of Edwin Drood |
| 2013 | Michael Yeargan | Golden Boy |
| 2013 | David Zinn | The Flick |
2014
| 2014 | **Christopher Barreca** | **Rocky the Musical** |
| 2014 | Alexander Dodge | A Gentleman's Guide to Love and Murder |
| 2014 | Richard Hoover | Small Engine Repair |
| 2014 | Santo Loquasto | Bullets Over Broadway |
| 2014 | Ian MacNeil | A Doll's House |
| 2014 | Donyale Werle | The Explorers Club |
2015
| 2015 | **Bob Crowley** | **An American in Paris** |
| 2015 | Christine Jones | Let the Right One In |
| 2015 | David Korins | Hamilton |
| 2015 | Mimi Lien | An Octoroon |
| 2015 | Scott Pask | The Visit |
| 2015 | Daniel Zimmerman | Fashions for Men |

== Multiple wins ==
4 wins

- Boris Aronson
- Robin Wagner

3 wins

- Santo Loquasto

2 wins

- Ming Cho Lee
- Tony Walton
- Eugene Lee
- John Lee Beatty
- Heidi Ettinger
- Rob Howell
- Mimi Lien

== Multiple nominations ==
11 nominations

- Santo Loquasto

9 nominations

- Tony Walton

6 nominations

- Douglas W. Schmidt
- John Lee Beatty

5 nominations

- Robin Wagner

4 nominations

- Boris Aronson
- Eugene Lee
- Bob Crowley
- Derek McLane
- David Korins

3 nominations

- Ming Cho Lee
- David Jenkins
- David Mitchell
- William Ritman
- Bob Shaw
- Andrew Jackness
- Marjorie Bradley Kellogg
- Tony Straiges
- Heidi Ettinger

2 nominations

- Kert Lundell
- Robert U. Taylor
- John Conklin
- John Napier
- Clarke Dunham
- Wilford Leach
- John Gunter
- Kevin Rigdon
- Thomas Lynch
- Edward Gianfrancesco
- David Gallo
- James Youmans
- Ian MacNeil
- Rob Howell

== See also ==
- Laurence Olivier Award for Best Set Design
- Tony Award for Best Scenic Design
