= Art and Life in America =

1949 book by Oliver W. Larkin

- Author: Oliver W. Larkin
- Language: English
- Genre: Non-fiction
- Publisher: Rinehart & Company
- Publication date: 1949
- Publication place: United States
- Pages: 547

Art and Life in America is a book by Oliver W. Larkin published in 1949 by Rinehart & Company which won the 1950 Pulitzer Prize for History. It is a book which comprehensively discusses art and artists in the United States.
