= Old Times =

Play written by Harold Pinter

- Original language: English
- Written by: Harold Pinter
- Characters: Anna; Deeley; Kate
- Setting: Autumn; night. A converted farmhouse.

Premiere
- Date: 1 June 1971
- Place: Aldwych Theatre; London

Old Times is a play by Harold Pinter. It was first performed by the Royal Shakespeare Company at the Aldwych Theatre in London on 1 June 1971. It starred Colin Blakely, Dorothy Tutin, and Vivien Merchant, and was directed by Peter Hall. The play was dedicated to Hall to celebrate his 40th birthday.

Peter Hall also directed the Broadway première, which opened at the Billy Rose Theater in New York City on 16 November 1971, starring Robert Shaw, Rosemary Harris and Mary Ure; and a year later, the German language première of the play at the Burgtheater in Vienna, with Maximilian Schell, Erika Pluhar and Annemarie Düringer. In February 2007 Hall returned again to the play directing a new production with his Theatre Royal, Bath company. Old Times was ranked among the 40 greatest plays ever written by Paul Taylor and Holly Williams of The Independent, and described as one of Pinter's "most haunting and unnerving pieces".

== List of characters ==
(With original cast)

- Deeley, a man in his forties (Colin Blakely)
- Kate, a woman in her forties (Dorothy Tutin)
- Anna, a woman in her forties (Vivien Merchant)

== Plot ==
The play begins with married couple Kate and Deeley smoking cigarettes and discussing Kate's old friend Anna, who is coming to visit them. Kate says that Anna was her only friend, but Anna had many friends. Deeley says he's never met Anna, and is surprised to hear that Kate and Anna roomed together 20 years ago. Kate says that Anna occasionally stole her underwear.

In the next scene, Anna arrives, talking incessantly about the fun times she and Kate shared in their youth. Kate says very little. Deeley tells Anna that he first met Kate at a movie and asked her out for coffee afterward. Anna's rebuttal is a story about her time living with Kate, when she came home to find Kate sitting in silence while a young man sat in their arm chair crying. Anna couldn't see his face because his hand was covering it while he cried. Neither of them said anything to her, so she awkwardly went to bed. Kate went to bed as well, and the man continued to sob in the darkness for a while before getting up and walking over to Anna's bed. He stared at her for a while, but she ignored him. He then went to Kate's bed and lay across her lap, and then he left. Anna emphasizes to Deeley that she ignored the man because she would have nothing to do with him. Kate neither confirms nor denies either of their stories, and eventually takes a bath.

While Kate is taking her bath, Deeley confronts Anna, telling her that he's met her before. He says she used to dress in black and get men to buy her drinks, and he fell for it, buying her a drink 20 years ago and going with her to party. They sat across the room from each other, and he looked up her skirt. A girl sat beside her and they talked, while Deeley was surrounded by men and lost track of the girls. When he got through the crowd to the couch where the girls had sat, they were gone. Anna pretends to have no idea what he's talking about, and he insists that she was trying to be Kate back then, mimicking her mannerisms and shy smile, but she wasn't as good at it. Deeley recounts first meeting Kate in a movie theater showing the film Odd Man Out.

Kate returns in her bathrobe, and the two compete for her attention, while she consistently says practically nothing. Eventually Anna admits that she once wore Kate's underwear to a party where a man unabashedly stared up her skirt. She goes on to tell Deeley that Kate always lent her underwear, asking her to wear it all the time. Kate says nothing, but when prompted to confirm or deny their stories, she says to Anna: "I remember you dead." Kate then goes on to describe how Anna had been dead in bed, covered in dirt, and how her body was gone when a man arrived. She told the man that no one slept in the extra bed, and he lay in it, thinking Kate would sleep with him. Instead, she nearly suffocated him with mud from the flower pot by the window, and his response was a proposal of marriage.

== Interpretations ==
One interpretation of the play is that all three characters were at one time real living people. Deeley met Anna first and slept with her, then later met Kate at the movies. Kate may or may not have been the friend Anna spoke with at the party. Deeley began dating Kate, and Kate found out that Anna was trying to steal him from her, so she killed Anna. Anna's death upset Deeley (he stared longingly into her empty bed), and Kate then killed him, too. Once he was dead, Kate's mind took over, imagining him hopelessly in love with her. She has lived the past 20 years in a fictional world where Anna and Deeley love her instead of each other.

Another interpretation is that Kate and Anna are different personalities of the same person, Kate being the prominent one. Deeley met "Anna" first, and the friend at the party was one of the many friends Anna had that Kate mentions in the first scene. Deeley then met Kate at the movies. Deeley cried in the chair when he discovered Kate's mental issue, and stared sadly at the empty bed before hugging Kate. Kate "killed" Anna for Deeley's sake. 20 years later, she tells him that Anna is returning, and he does all he can to keep Kate from allowing Anna back into her life, ultimately succeeding by the end of the play, when Kate kills Anna again by recalling the first time she killed her.

A third interpretation is that the whole play takes place in Deeley's subconscious. Kate is, in fact, not Deeley's wife but a representation of the cold, distant mother whom he could woo but never please. Anna represents complete sexual freedom—but to his consternation, although Anna seems to be attracted to him at first, she turns out to be wearing Kate's underwear and is much more interested in Kate than in Deeley. Kate awards Deeley one rare smile, which she refuses to bestow on Anna, and then proceeds to "kill" both Anna and Deeley with her words. Deeley, realizing he is indeed the "odd man out", is reduced to a sobbing little boy, but Kate still won't comfort him.

During rehearsals for a Roundabout Theatre Company production in 1984, Anthony Hopkins, who starred, asked Pinter to explain the play's ending. Pinter responded, "I don't know. Just do it."

== Themes ==
Harold Pinter:

- "One way of looking at speech is to say it is a stratagem to cover nakedness."
- "What goes on in my plays is realistic, but what I’m doing is not realism."
- "The past is what you remember, imagine you remember, convince yourself you remember, or pretend you remember."
- "A thing is not necessarily either true or false; it can be both true and false."

Cecily in The Importance of Being Earnest by Oscar Wilde:

- "Memory usually chronicles the things that have never happened, and couldn't possibly have happened."

== Selected production history ==
=== Some recent productions ===
- 1983 Roundabout Stage I (23rd Street Theater) New York City, with Jane Alexander as Anna, Anthony Hopkins as Deeley, Marsha Mason as Kate, directed by Kenneth Frankel.
- 1995 Theatr Clwyd revival by Lindy Davies, at the Emlyn Williams Studio in May, transferred to Wyndham's Theatre, London, starring Leigh Lawson, Harriet Walter and Julie Christie; with a darkly imposing brick back-drop designed by Julian McGowan
- 1997 Little Theater revival by Angelo Zuccolo, in Binghamton, New York, starring Ryan Williams & Angelique Zuccolo; with a single wall-and-open-window design by William Manos
- 2004 Donmar Warehouse, London: directed by Roger Michell, with Jeremy Northam, Gina McKee and Helen McCrory; played against an abstract mirrored set design by William Dudley
- 2005 Wharf Theatre, Sydney: directed by Lindy Davies and starring Elizabeth Alexander as Kate, Angela Punch McGregor as Anna and William Zappa as Deeley
- 2007 UK tour: directed by Peter Hall, starring Neil Pearson as Deeley, Janie Dee as Kate and Susannah Harker as Anna
- 2007 Neptune Theatre (Halifax), Canada: directed by Brian Richmond, starring Ruth Madoc-Jones, Dan Lett and Lenore Zann
- 2008 Harvard University, Adams Pool Theater: directed and performed by Dan Pecci, Renée Pastel, and Julia Renaud
- 2008 New York University, College of Arts and Science Theater: directed by Jillian Schiavi, starring Alexandra Carr as Kate, Zachary Fithian as Deeley, and Alexandra Bryan as Anna
- 2008 Clarion University of Pennsylvania, Marwick-Boyd Little Theater: directed by Robert Bullington, starring Tyler Cramer, Natalie Dunn and Kate Quigley
- 2009 Yale University, Whitney Humanities Center Theater: directed by Toni Dorfman, starring Hannah Corrigan, Michael Leibenluft, and Elizabeth Sutton-Stone
- 2009 Paragon Theater, Denver, Colorado: Directed by Suzanne Favette, starring Carolyn Valentine, Emily Paton Davies, and Kevin Hart
- 2009 American Players Theatre, Wisconsin: directed by Laura Gordon, starring Jonathan Smoots, Tracy Arnold and Carey Cannon
- 2010 University of York Drama Society. Directed by Jonathan Kerridge-Phipps, starring Serena Manteghi, Sam Hinton and Georgia Bird
- 2010 Boston University School of Theatre: Directed by Chris Junno, starring Marion Le Coguic, Kat Crawley, and Ross Neuenfeldt
- 2011 Shakespeare Theatre Company, Washington, DC: Directed by Michael Kahn, starring Steven Culp, Tracy Lynn Middendorf, and Holly Twyford
- 2013 Harold Pinter Theatre London, UK: Directed by Ian Rickson starring Rufus Sewell, Kristin Scott Thomas and Lia Williams.
- 2014 Theatre by the Lake, Keswick, UK: Directed by Mary Papadima, starring Liam Smith as Deeley, Rebecca Todd as Kate, and Katie Hayes as Anna
- 2015 Roundabout Theatre Company at the American Airlines Theatre, New York City: Directed by Douglas Hodge, starring Clive Owen in his Broadway debut as Deeley, Kelly Reilly as Kate, and Eve Best as Anna; music by Thom Yorke.
- 2024 Chautauqua Theater Company at the Bratton Theater, Chautauqua, NY: Directed by Katie McGerr, starring Andrew Borba as Deeley, Vivienne Benesch as Kate, and Rebecca Guy as Anna, with Stage Directions read by Kamal Sehrawy. Performed as a staged benefit reading for Chautauqua Theater Company.

== Awards and nominations ==
=== Original Broadway production ===
Year	Award	Category	Nominee	Result
1972	Tony Award	Best Play		Nominated
1972	Tony Award	Best Actress in a Play	Rosemary Harris	Nominated
1972	Tony Award	Best Direction of a Play	Peter Hall	Nominated
1972	Tony Award	Best Scenic Design	John Bury	Nominated
1972	Tony Award	Best Lighting Design	John Bury	Nominated
1972	Drama Desk Award	Outstanding Performance	Rosemary Harris	Won
1972	Drama Desk Award	Outstanding Director of a Play	Peter Hall	Won
