= Ruth Brinkmann =

American actress

- Born: July 27, 1934; Berlin, Germany
- Died: January 18, 1997 (age 62)

Ruth Brinkmann (July 27, 1934 – January 18, 1997) was the founder of Vienna's English Theatre.

== Early life ==
Ruth Brinkmann was brought up in the Long Island suburbs of New York City. She studied acting at the Yale University Graduate School of Drama, directly from which she made her New York debut as Louise in G. B. Shaw's In Good King Charles's Golden Days, and continued her professional career in repertory at the Williamstown Playhouse in Massachusetts, the Cleveland Playhouse in Ohio, as well as the Court Theatre in Beloit, Wisconsin; Manhattan's Town Hall, and the Chautauqua Arts Festival.

== Career ==
Subsequent to these appearances, Brinkmann was, together with Alan Alda, chosen from more than one thousand actors who auditioned for the Ford Foundation's experimental theatre program at the Cleveland Playhouse in Ohio. Her Ford award was for three years, but, on her first summer vacation from Cleveland in 1959, she visited Vienna as a tourist. She met and later married the Austrian director, Franz Schafranek, and settled there in 1960.

=== English-language theater in Vienna ===
As she spoke no German at the time, her husband had the idea of starting an English-language theatre that would enable her to continue her work. The young couple opened their theatre in 1963 in a rented 99-seat auditorium in a downtown palace with a production of Jerome Kilty's Dear Liar, starring Brinkmann and Anthony Steel, directed by Franz Schafranek.

=== Acting roles abroad ===
For the first ten years before Vienna's English Theatre acquired its permanent home, she played the female lead in every production except two. Among them were multiple roles in The World of Carl Sandburg and Edgar Lee Masters' Spoon River Anthology, as well as the four ladies in Thornton Wilder's Queens of France. She also played the Lady in Shaw's Man of Destiny, Doris in The Owl and the Pussycat, Miss Prism in Oscar Wilde's The Importance of Being Earnest, and Amanda in The Glass Menagerie, which subsequently toured throughout Israel.

At the Josefsgasse opening, Brinkmann starred in Terence Rattigan's In Praise of Love, and when Spoon River was revived — with Ruth Brinkmann playing 22 different roles — the American Journalist Nino Lo Bello wrote in the Los Angeles Times that "she has just wrapped up another of her 'tours de force' successes". Her multiple roles and quick changes in this production also won her a niche in Ripley's Believe It or Not gallery.

== 1970's ==
In the following season, 1976, Tennessee Williams honoured Vienna's English Theatre with the world premiere of The Red Devil Battery Sign, in which Brinkmann starred as the Woman Downtown. Thomas Quinn Curtiss wrote in the International Herald Tribune that Williams had been "magnificently served by Vienna's English Theatre's production (directed by Franz Schafranek). Ruth Brinkmann, an American actress, is superb as the distracted woman... a portrayal of astonishing range, which captures both the bitter anger and the moving pathos of the difficult role." In 1978 she played Sheila in Alan Ayckbourn's Relatively Speaking, opposite the British actor Roger Lloyd Pack.

In 1979, Brinkmann was invited by the Wiener Konzerthaus to venture into the music world by performing the William Walton/Edith Sitwell collaboration, Façade, under the direction of Friedrich Cerha. Soon afterwards she was dialogue director for the English-language version of the musical Jesus Christ Superstar for two seasons at the Theater an der Wien, and in 1981 she made her German-language stage debut as Countess Almaviva in Ödön von Horvath's Figaro läßt sich scheiden at the Theater in der Josefstadt.

== 1980's ==
In June 1981, at the invitation of Professor Otto Molden, she performed Alan Levy's adaptation of The World of Ruth Draper at the opening of the Dialogue Congress Western Europe - USA in Alpbach in the Tyrol, Austria. This presentation was followed by the play's World Premiere at Vienna's English Theatre in February, 1982.

Early in 1983, she was invited to do a guest appearance of the show at the South Street Theatre on Times Square's Theatre Row in New York City. She returned to Vienna for the 20th anniversary celebrations of Vienna's English Theatre, for which she played the title rote in G. B. Shaw's Candida, in the presence of Princess Alexandra of Kent, who came to Vienna especially for the occasion. Brinkmann and her husband also received a personal letter of citation on the Theatre's 20th Anniversary from President and Mrs. Ronald Reagan.

In 1984 Ruth Brinkmann made her debut as director with Graham Greene's The Complaisant Lover and on October 10, she was honored by the Mayor of Vienna, Dr. Helmut Zilk, who awarded her the Grosses Silberne Ehrenzeichen (Vienna's Silver Medal of Honor). In 1987 she played Julia in Noël Coward's Fallen Angels, and directed Arthur Miller's I Can't Remember Anything, again for both Alpbach and Vienna.

For the 25th Anniversary Season of the Theatre in 1988, she played Hester in Terence Rattigan's The Deep Blue Sea, and acted in A. R. Gurney's The Dining Room. At Alpbach the following August, she portrayed Lillian Hellman in the European premiere of William Luce's Lillian, after which she began rehearsals in London, directing and acting in Alan Ayckbourn's Absurd Person Singular. During the run of this play, on November 5, 1989, at a gala evening in Vienna's English Theatre hosted by the Federal Foreign Minister of Austria, Dr. Alois Mock and his wife, Dr. Edith Mock, the Minister personally presented to Ruth Brinkmann the Golden Cross of Meritorious Service to the Republic of Austria. In his Laudatio the Minister stressed that the award was "in recognition of her dedicated contribution to Austro-American-Anglo cultural life. Through her artistic achievements she has played a major role in the better understanding of our respective people." After the sudden death of Franz Schafranek on June 4, 1991, Ruth Brinkmann took over as director of the theatre. Her first production, in the autumn of 1991, was the European premiere of Paul Rudnick's I Hate Hamlet which featured Horst Buchholz and his son Christopher.

== 1990's ==
In October 1993, Ruth Brinkmann returned to the stage for the 30th anniversary production of the theatre in which she portrayed the author Helene Hanff in James Roose-Evans' adaptation of 84 Charing Cross Road. The opening performance took place under the patronage of the Federal Foreign Minister Dr. Alois Mock and his wife Dr. Edith Mock and in the presence of Princess Alexandra.

Queen Elizabeth II appointed Ruth Brinkmann an Honorary Member of the Most Excellent Order of the British Empire (M.B.E.). This award was presented to Brinkmann by the British Ambassador in Vienna, Terence Wood on April 11, 1994.

== Death ==
Ruth Brinkmann died on January 18, 1997, after 6 years of fighting against ovarian cancer.

Her lifelong devotion to art was honoured by the many awards she received from Austria, England and the United States of America.
