= Yale School of Drama =

Professional school at Yale University

Coordinates: 41°18′34.7″N 72°55′51.7″W

David Geffen School of Drama at Yale University
- Coat of arms of the school
- Former names: Department of Drama in the School of Fine Arts (1924–1955); Yale School of Drama (1955–2021)
- Established: 1924; 102 years ago
- Parent institution: Yale University
- Dean: Evan Yionoulis
- Faculty: 79
- Students: 248
- Location: New Haven, Connecticut, U.S.
- Website: drama.yale.edu

The David Geffen School of Drama at Yale University is a graduate professional school of Yale University, located in New Haven, Connecticut. Founded in 1924 as the Department of Drama in the School of Fine Arts, the school provides training in every discipline of the theatre – acting, design (set design, costume design, lighting design, projection design, and sound design), directing, dramaturgy and dramatic criticism, playwriting, stage management, technical design and production, and theatre management. It was known as the Yale School of Drama until a $150 million gift by David Geffen in 2021.

The school operates in partnership with the Yale Repertory Theatre, also located in New Haven.

== History ==
The school traces its roots to the Yale Dramatic Association, the second-oldest college theatre association in the US, founded in 1900. The "Dramat" produced the American premieres of Albert Camus's Caligula and Shakespeare's Troilus and Cressida, as well as original works by Cole Porter, Stephen Vincent Benét, and Thornton Wilder written when they were students.

In 1924, Yale benefactor Edward S. Harkness provided funds to the Department of Drama in the School of Fine Arts and for the construction of the University Theatre, later to become the school's primary building. Completed in 1931, it was designed by Clarence H. Blackall and then later renovated by James Gamble Rogers. George Pierce Baker, a teacher of playwriting, was the first chairman of the department.

In 1955, the department was organized as a separate professional school, the first such in the Ivy League. In 1966, under Dean Robert Brustein, the Yale Repertory Theatre was formed to establish further ties between the professional and academic communities. Lloyd Richards, dean and artistic director from 1979 to 1991, increased the theatre's emphasis on new plays, premiering works by Athol Fugard, Lee Blessing, and August Wilson. Richards' successor as dean and artistic director, Stan Wojewodski Jr., continued to emphasize the production of new plays, including several important works by Suzan-Lori Parks and Theatre de la Jeune Lune. The current dean and artistic director, James Bundy, has produced notable premieres by David Rabe, José Rivera, David Adjmi, and Sarah Ruhl, among others, as well as Radio Golf, the tenth play in August Wilson's 20th century cycle.

== Facilities ==
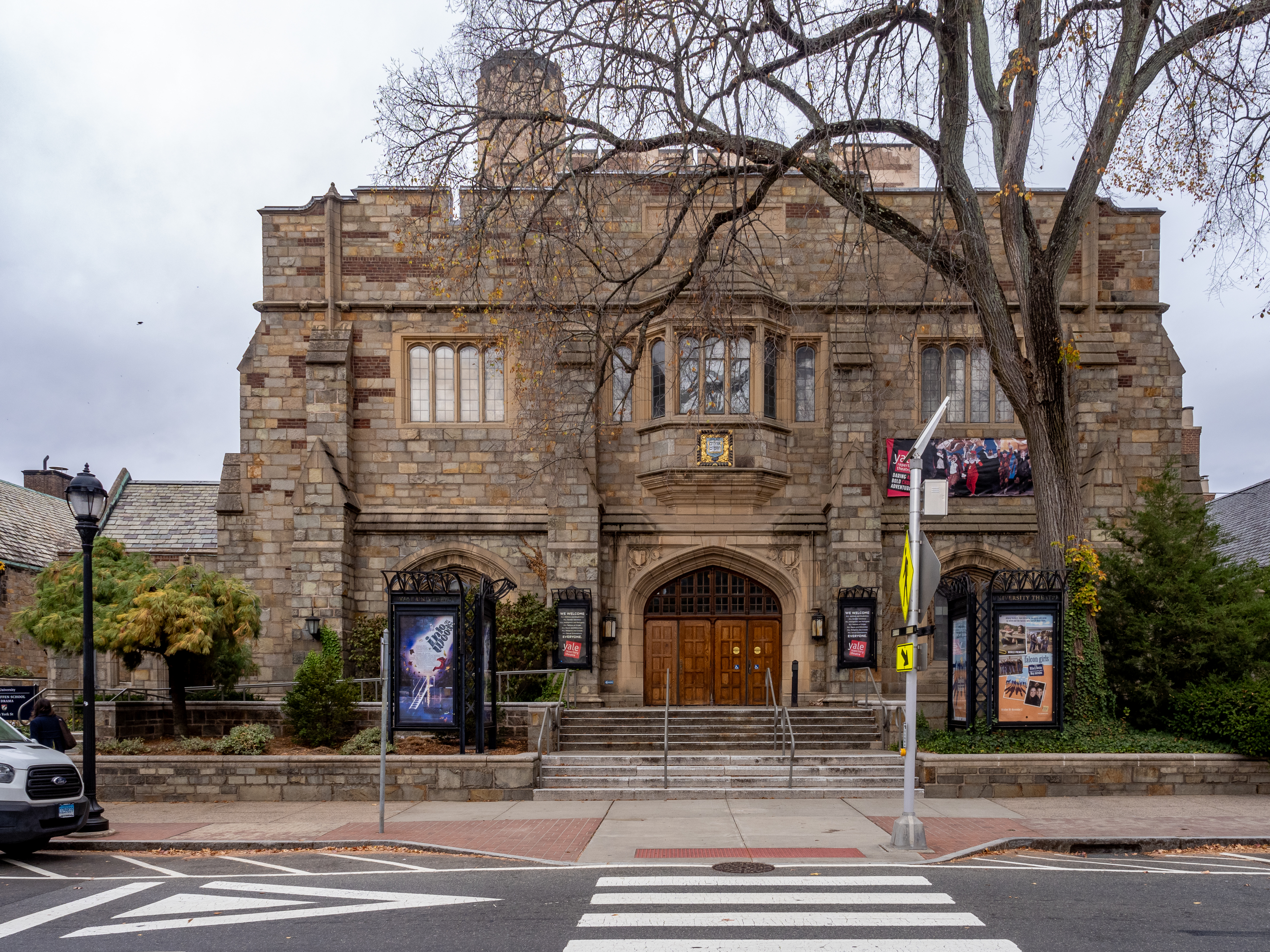
University Theater

A variety of locations on the Yale University campus serve the David Geffen School of Drama at Yale. The University Theatre is a proscenium theatre that is shared with the undergraduate dramatic association and also houses the school's main administrative offices. The Yale Repertory Theatre is located in the former building of the Calvary Baptist Church and contains an auditorium and the David Geffen School of Drama at Yale/Yale Repertory Theatre box office. Additional facilities include the Iseman Theater in Holcombe T. Green Jr. Hall, the School of Drama Annex, and the Robert B. Haas Family Arts Library.

== Academics ==
=== Admissions ===
Admission to the school has been highly competitive for a long time. The Yale Herald reported that the school received 1,270 applications for the class of 1999 and admitted 68 applicants for an acceptance rate of 5.4%. In 2010, annual applications peaked at 1,520, with strict caps on admission to each of the school's nine programs.

The cost of tuition for the 2020–21 academic year was $32,800. After his appointment in 2002, School Dean James Bundy made improving financial aid for students a priority. The school's financial aid budget grew from $1.4 million to over $6.1 million in 2017, with significant reductions in debt upon graduation. Financial aid is awarded on the basis of financial need, with awards consisting of a combination of work-study employment, an educational loan, a tuition scholarship, and a living stipend. As of 2016, the average student with demonstrated financial need receives aid providing for 82 percent of the total cost of attendance.

In June 2021, Yale announced a $150 million donation from David Geffen that would permanently cover the costs of tuition for all admitted students.

=== Enrollment ===
As of fall 2015, there were 194 students enrolled at the School, 18% of which were international students.

=== Degrees and certificates ===
The David Geffen School of Drama at Yale offers a Master of Fine Arts (M.F.A.) in acting, design, sound design, directing, dramaturgy and dramatic criticism, playwriting, stage management, technical design and production, and theatre management. Students must hold an undergraduate degree and complete their program of study with distinction, which requires three years in residence. The school also offers a Doctor of Fine Arts (D.F.A.) to students who hold an M.F.A. degree in Dramaturgy and Dramatic Criticism and have written a dissertation approved by the D.F.A. committee.

A Certificate in Drama is available to those students who do not hold an undergraduate degree from an accredited college, but who are admitted and complete the same training as M.F.A. students. A Technical Internship Certificate is available to students who complete a one-year internship program of the Technical Design and Production department.

=== Rankings ===
The School has emerged as one of the nation's best theatre conservatories.

== Student life ==
=== Activities ===
Founded in 1968, the Yale Cabaret is an entirely student-run extracurricular activity that allows students to create productions of their own. It is the only production opportunity at the school that allows students to work outside of their discipline. Patricia Clarkson, Tony Shalhoub, Kate Burton, David Alan Grier, Christopher Durang, and Wendy Wasserstein, among countless others, all performed at the Cabaret."

== Notable people ==
=== Faculty ===
Faculty members are working professionals in their fields and in many cases graduates of the school themselves. As of fall 2015, there are 79 faculty members. James Bundy is the current dean of the school as well as the artistic director of Yale Repertory Theatre.

Acting department faculty include Gregory Wallace, Ron Van Lieu, Erica Fae, Christopher Bayes, Cynthia Santos-DeCure, Tlaloc Rivas, Walton Wilson, and Tamilla Woodard, who also serves as chair of the program.

Directing department faculty include Emily Coates, Yuri Kordonsky, Robert Woodruff, and department chair Liz Diamond. Designers include Jane Greenwood, Jess Goldstein, Wendall K. Harrington, and Jennifer Tipton.

Playwrights include John Guare, Michael Korie, MJ Kaufman, Lisa Kron, Tina Landau, Richard Nelson, Lynn Nottage, Peter Parnell, Adam Rapp, Paula Vogel, and Derek Walcott.

Critics include Allardyce Nicoll. Music consultants include Rusty Magee.

Former faculty includes dancer/choreographer Carmen de Lavallade, set designer Ming Cho Lee, actor Earle Gister and directors Robert Brustein, F. Curtis Canfield, Keith Fowler, and Nikos Psacharopoulos.

=== Alumni ===
This is a list of alumni of the David Geffen School of Drama at Yale University and its predecessors. It is not exhaustive of all attendees of the drama school, only of notable persons who can be reliably sourced as students.

==== Acting ====
- Kimberleigh Aarn – Acting (1986); 1988 Tony nominee
- Yahya Abdul-Mateen II – Acting (2015)
- David Ackroyd – Acting (1968)
- Bruce Altman – Acting (1990)
- Amy Aquino – Acting (1986)
- Mamoudou Athie – Acting (2014)
- Jayne Atkinson – Acting (1985)
- Dylan Baker – Acting (1985)
- Patrick Ball – Acting (2022)
- Raymond J. Barry – Acting (1965)
- Martine Bartlett – Acting (1948)
- Gary Basaraba – Acting (1982)
- Angela Bassett – Acting (1983)
- Ralph Bates – Acting (1965)
- Chris Bauer – Acting (1992)
- Alan Baxter – Acting (1932)
- Richard Bey – Acting (1976)
- Ato Blankson-Wood – Acting (2015); 2020 Tony nominee
- Sorrell Booke – Acting
- Ruth Brinkmann – Acting (1963)
- Jabari Brisport – Acting (2014)
- Brennan Brown – Acting (2000)
- Robert Curtis Brown – Acting (1982)
- Andrew Burnap – Acting (2016)
- Kate Burton – Acting (1982)
- Trai Byers – Acting (2011)
- Rob Campbell – Acting (1990)
- Juliana Canfield – Acting (2017)
- Charise Castro Smith – Acting (2010)
- Reg E. Cathey – Acting (1981)
- Esther K. Chae – Acting (1999)
- James Chen – Acting (2008)
- Chung King-fai – Acting (1962)
- Caitlin Clarke – Acting (1978)
- Patricia Clarkson – Acting (1985)
- Christian Clemenson – Acting (1984)
- David Clennon – Acting (1968)
- Chris Henry Coffey – Acting (1999)
- Enrico Colantoni – Acting (1993)
- Forrest Compton – Acting (1953)
- Suzanne Cryer – Acting (1995)
- Alma Cuervo – Acting (1976)
- Seán Cullen – Acting (1990)
- James Cusati-Moyer – Acting (2015); 2020 Tony nominee
- Brett Dalton – Acting (2011)
- Jason Davis – Acting (2004)
- Stephen DeRosa – Acting (1995)
- Peter Donat – Acting (1952–1953; left)
- Jeff Donnell – Acting
- Edmund Donovan – Acting (2017)
- Polly Draper – Acting (1980)
- Winston Duke – Acting (2013)
- Charles S. Dutton – Acting (1983)
- Jill Eikenberry – Acting (1970)
- Rick Elice – Acting (1979)
- Melissa Errico – Acting (left)
- Christine Estabrook – Acting (1976)
- Stephanie Faracy – Acting
- Melanie Field – Acting (2016)
- Bridget Flanery – Acting (2002)
- Patrick Foley – Acting (2018); 2021 Pulitzer finalist
- Jodie Foster - Acting (1984)
- Joseph Fuqua – Acting (1990)
- Willie Garson – Acting
- Malcolm Gets – Acting (1992)
- Marcus Giamatti – Acting (1987)
- Paul Giamatti – Acting (1994)
- Susan Gibney – Acting
- Robert Ginty – Acting (1972; left)
- Jay Goede – Acting (1991)
- Eve Gordon – Acting (1981)
- David Marshall Grant – Acting (1978)
- Karron Graves – Acting (2003)
- David Alan Grier – Acting (1981)
- Joe Grifasi – Acting (1975)
- Michael Gross – Acting (1973)
- Kathryn Hahn – Acting (2001)
- Julie Harris – Acting (1944–1945)
- Don Harvey – Acting (1985)
- Marcus Henderson – Acting (2011)
- Brian Tyree Henry – Acting (2007)
- Ken Howard – Acting (left 1969)
- Ernie Hudson – Acting (1975–1976; left)
- Matthew Humphreys – Acting (2003)
- Moses Ingram – Acting (2019)
- Louisa Jacobson – Acting (2019)
- Jane Kaczmarek – Acting (1982)
- James Keach – Acting (1970)
- Stacy Keach – Acting (1966; left)
- Warren Keith – Acting
- Mike Kellin – Acting
- Patrick Kerr – Acting (1987)
- Aja Naomi King – Acting (2010)
- Robert Klein – Acting (1965; left)
- Dudley Knight – Acting (1965)
- Chalia La Tour – Acting (2016); 2020 Tony nominee
- Sanaa Lathan – Acting (1995)
- Sabrina Le Beauf – Acting (1984)
- C. S. Lee – Acting (1998)
- Sydney Lemmon – Acting (2017)
- Charles Levin – Acting (1974)
- Mitchell Lichtenstein – Acting (1981)
- Jennifer Lim – Acting (2004)
- Mark Linn-Baker – Acting (1979)
- John Bedford Lloyd – Acting (1982)
- Jim MacLaren – Acting (1989)
- Peter Macon – Acting (2003)
- Jonathan Majors – Acting (2016)
- Delbert Mann – Acting (1973)
- Mary Mara – Acting (1989)
- Mozhan Marnò – Acting (2005)
- Richard Masur – Acting
- Heather Mazur – Acting (2003)
- Tom McCarthy – Acting (1995)
- Tom McGowan – Acting (1988)
- Frances McDormand – Acting (1982)
- Peter McRobbie – Acting (1966)
- Anne Meacham – Acting (1947)
- Fred Melamed – Acting (1981)
- William Mesnik – Acting
- Philip Moon – Acting (1987)
- James Naughton – Acting (1970)
- Marissa Neitling – Acting (2013)
- Obi Ndefo – Acting (1997)
- Paul Newman – Acting (1951–1952)
- Kristine Nielsen – Acting (1980)
- Tom Noonan – Acting (1973)
- Elizabeth Norment – Acting (1979)
- Chris Noth – Acting (1985)
- Carrie Nye – Acting
- Lupita Nyong'o – Acting (2012)
- Barbara O'Neil – Acting (1931)
- Dick Orkin – Acting (1958)
- Maulik Pancholy – Acting (2003)
- Evan Parke – Acting (1997)
- Ilia Isorelýs Paulino – Acting (2020)
- Geoff Pierson – Acting (1980)
- Bryce Pinkham – Acting (2008)
- Joel Polis – Acting (1976)
- Michael Potts – Acting (1992)
- Addison Powell – Acting (1948)
- Sarah Rafferty – Acting (1996)
- Da'Vine Joy Randolph – Acting (2011)
- Lance Reddick – Acting (1994)
- Adam Richman – Acting (2003)
- Tijuana Ricks – Acting (2004)
- Laila Robins – Acting (1984)
- Michael Rogers – Acting (1985)
- Reg Rogers – Acting (1993)
- Alan Rosenberg – Acting (1974)
- John Rothman – Acting (1975)
- Adam Saunders – Acting (2005)
- Liev Schreiber – Acting (1992)
- Kimberly Scott – Acting (1987)
- Louise Shaffer – Acting (1965)
- Tony Shalhoub – Acting (1980)
- Talia Shire – Acting (1969; left)
- Steven Skybell – Acting (1984)
- Roger Guenveur Smith – Acting (1983)
- Sarah Sokolovic – Acting (2011)
- Meryl Streep – Acting (1975)
- Robin Strasser – Acting (1965)
- John Turturro – Acting (1983)
- Joe Urla – Acting (1985)
- Joan Van Ark – Acting (1964; left)
- Courtney B. Vance – Acting (1986)
- Elliot Villar – Acting (2007)
- Gary Waldhorn – Acting (1967)
- Sharon Washington - Acting (1988)
- Sigourney Weaver – Acting (1974)
- Michael Whaley – Acting (1977)
- Peter White – Acting (1962)
- Isuri Wijesundara – Acting (2023)
- Henry Winkler – Acting (1970)
- Bess Wohl – Acting (2002)
- D. B. Woodside – Acting (1996)
- Jeff Yagher – Acting (1984; left)
- Yao – Acting (2023)

==== Design ====
- Christopher Akerlind – Lighting Design (1989)
- Dede Ayite – Costume Design (2011)
- John Lee Beatty – Scenic Design (1973)
- Robert Blackman – Costume Design (1970)
- Montana Levi Blanco – Costume Design (2015)
- Mel Bourne – Scenic Design (1948; left)
- Herbert Brodkin – Scenic Design (1940)
- Tom Broecker – Costume Design (1992)
- Jiyoun Chang – Lighting Design (2008); 2020 and 2022 Tony nominee
- Linda Cho – Costume Design (1998)
- Pat Collins – Lighting Design (1958)
- John Conklin – Scenic Design (1966)
- Jean Eckart – Scenic Design
- William Eckart – Scenic Design
- Heidi Ettinger – Scenic Design (1976)
- John Ezell – Scenic Design (1960)
- Ed Flesh – Scenic Design (1956)
- Paul Gallo – Lighting Design (1977)
- Jess Goldstein – Costume Design (1978)
- Palmer Hefferan – Sound Design (2013); 2022 and 2025 Tony nominee
- Gilbert Vaughn Hemsley Jr. – Lighting Design (1960)
- Riccardo Hernández – Scenic Design (1992); 2020 Tony nominee
- Susan Hilferty – Costume Design (1980)
- Donald Holder – Lighting Design (1986)
- Nicholas Hussong – Scenic Design (2012); 2022 Tony nominee
- Suzanne Jackson – Scenic Design (1990)
- Peter Larkin – Scenic Design (1947)
- Tambi Larsen – Scenic Design (1935)
- Eugene Lee – Scenic Design (1986)
- Adrianne Lobel – Scenic Design (1979)
- William Ivey Long – Scenic Design (1975)
- Santo Loquasto – Scenic Design (1972)
- Derek McLane – Scenic Design (1984)
- Skip Mercier – Scenic Design (1983)
- Jennifer Moeller – Costume Design (2006); 2022 and 2023 Tony nominee
- Tharon Musser – Lighting Design (1950)
- Scott Pask – Scenic Design (1997)
- Fitz Patton – Sound Design (2001); 2019 Tony winner and 2020 Tony nominee
- Emily Rebholz – Costume Design (2006); 2020 Tony nominee
- Adam Rigg – Scenic Design (2014); 2022 Tony nominee
- Constanza Romero – Costume Design (1988)
- Jean Rosenthal – Lighting Design (1934)
- Todd Rosenthal – Scenic Design (1993)
- Adam Stockhausen – Scenic Design (1999)
- Hannah Wasileski – Lighting Design (2013); 2025 Tony nominee
- Robert Wierzel – Lighting Design (1984)
- Michael Yates – Scenic Design (1941)
- Michael Yeargan – Scenic Design (1973)
- Yi Zhao – Lighting Design (2012); 2022 Tony nominee
- Donna Zakowska – Costume Design (1983)
- Catherine Zuber – Costume Design (1984)

==== Directing ====
- May Adrales – Directing (2006)
- A. J. Antoon – Directing (left)
- John Badham – Directing (1963)
- Melvin Bernhardt – Directing (1955)
- Lileana Blain-Cruz – Directing (2012)
- Ralf D. Bode – Directing
- Sandra Boynton – Directing (1979; left)
- Mark Brokaw – Directing (1986)
- Arvin Brown – Directing (1967)
- James Bundy – Directing (1995)
- James Burrows – Directing (1965)
- Lawrence Carra – Directing (1935)
- Robert Cohen – Directing (DFA 1965)
- Edward Cornell – Directing (1968)
- Jan Eliasberg – Directing (1981)
- James W. Flannery – Directing (1961)
- Shannon Flynn – Directing (2002)
- Keith Fowler – Directing (DFA 1969)
- Jonathan Frid – Directing (1957)
- Dennie Gordon – Directing (1977)
- Ulu Grosbard – Directing (1952–1953)
- Joseph Hardy – Directing (1958)
- Jon Jory – Directing (1963–1965)
- Robert Kalfin – Directing (1957)
- Asaad Kelada – Directing (1964)
- Romulus Linney – Directing (1958)
- Richard Maltby Jr. – Directing (1962)
- Lynne Meadow – Directing (1971)
- Tom Moore – Directing (1968)
- George Morrison – Directing (1953)
- Jonathan Moscone – Directing (1993)
- Francine Parker – Directing (1959)
- Nikos Psacharopoulos – Directing (1954)
- Steven Robman – Directing (1973)
- Boris Sagal – Directing
- Anna D. Shapiro – Directing (1993)
- John Shea – Directing (1973)
- Rebecca Taichman – Directing (2000)
- Steve Zuckerman – Directing (1974)

==== Dramaturgy and dramatic criticism (formerly dramatic literature) ====
- Allan Albert – Dramatic Literature/Criticism (left 1969)
- Michael Breslin – Dramaturgy/Criticism (MFA 2019, DFA candidate); 2021 Pulitzer finalist
- Robert Brustein – Dramatic Literature/Criticism (1948–1949)
- Ernest Ferlita – Dramatic Literature/Criticism (DFA 1969)
- Rocco Landesman – Dramatic Literature/Criticism (MFA 1972, DFA 1976)
- Michael Lassell – Dramatic Literature/Criticism (1976)
- James Magruder – Dramaturgy/Criticism (MFA 1988, DFA 1992)
- Charles McNulty – Dramaturgy/Criticism (MFA 1993, DFA 1995)
- Madeline Miller – Dramaturgy/Criticism (2009–2010)
- Philomena Muinzer – Dramaturgy/Criticism (1980)
- Kate O'Toole – Dramaturgy/Criticism (1985)
- Andrew Paulson – Dramaturgy/Criticism (1981–1982)
- Nahma Sandrow – Dramatic Literature/Criticism (DFA 1970)

==== Playwriting ====
- Liz Duffy Adams – Playwriting (1997)
- Roberto Aguirre-Sacasa – Playwriting (2003)
- Christina Anderson – Playwriting (2011)
- Lewis Black – Playwriting (1977)
- Brother Blue – Playwriting (1953)
- E. Roger Boyle – Playwriting (left)
- Janet Burroway – Playwriting (1963)
- Vincent J. Cardinal – Playwriting (1990)
- Fred Coe – Playwriting (1940)
- Bill Corbett – Playwriting (1989)
- Owen Dodson – Playwriting (1939)
- Christopher Durang – Playwriting (1974)
- Erik Ehn – Playwriting (1983)
- Leslie Epstein – Playwriting (DFA 1967)
- Femi Euba – Playwriting (1973)
- Charles Evered – Playwriting (1991)
- Michael Feingold – Playwriting (1972)
- Lindsey Ferrentino – Playwriting (2016)
- Richard Foreman – Playwriting (1962)
- Kimon Friar – Playwriting (1932)
- Marcus Gardley – Playwriting (2004)
- Stephen Geller – Playwriting (1964)
- Melissa James Gibson – Playwriting (1995)
- Frank D. Gilroy – Playwriting (1953; left)
- Richard Greenberg – Playwriting (1985)
- John Guare – Playwriting (1963)
- A. R. Gurney – Playwriting (1958)
- Jeremy O. Harris – Playwriting (2019)
- Allan Havis – Playwriting (1980)
- Amy Herzog – Playwriting (2007)
- M. Carl Holman – Playwriting (1954)
- Slade Hopkinson – Playwriting (1966)
- David Henry Hwang – Playwriting (1983; left)
- Albert Innaurato – Playwriting (1974)
- David Ives – Playwriting (1984)
- Talbot Jennings – Playwriting (1931)
- Rolin Jones – Playwriting (2004)
- Hansol Jung – Playwriting (2014)
- Lee Kalcheim – Playwriting
- Sam Kelley – Playwriting (1990)
- Frederick R. Koch – Playwriting (1961)
- Harry Kondoleon – Playwriting (1981)
- Kenneth Lin – Playwriting (2005)
- Wendy MacLeod – Playwriting (1987)
- David Madden – Playwriting (1960)
- Martyna Majok – Playwriting (2012)
- Albert Maltz – Playwriting (1932)
- William Marchant – Playwriting
- Grace McKeaney – Playwriting
- Tarell Alvin McCraney – Playwriting (2007)
- David J. McDonald Jr. – Playwriting (1964)
- JP Miller – Playwriting (1954)
- Meg Miroshnik – Playwriting (2011)
- Michael Mitnick – Playwrighting (2010)
- Tad Mosel – Playwriting (1950)
- Brighde Mullins – Playwriting (1987)
- Lynn Nottage – Playwriting (1989)
- OyamO – Playwriting (1981)
- a. k. payne - Playwriting (2020)
- David Rayfiel – Playwriting (1950)
- Keith Reddin – Playwriting (1981)
- Ola Rotimi – Playwriting (1966)
- Joanna Russ – Playwriting (1960)
- Robert Sandberg – Playwriting (1977)
- David Shaber – Playwriting (1954)
- Betty Shamieh – Playwriting (2009)
- Susan H. Schulman – Playwriting (1967)
- Michael Shurtleff – Playwriting (1952)
- Roger L. Simon – Playwriting (1968)
- William Snyder – Playwriting (1955)
- Ron Sproat – Playwriting (1958)
- Leslie Stevens – Playwriting
- Michael Stewart – Playwriting (1953)
- Milan Stitt – Playwriting (1963)
- Jon Stone – Playwriting (1955)
- Peter Stone – Playwriting (1953)
- Ted Tally – Playwriting (1977)
- Sarah Treem – Playwriting (2005)
- Rodolfo Usigli – Playwriting (1936)
- Donald Vining – Playwriting (1941)
- Wendy Wasserstein – Playwriting (1976)
- Ron Whyte – Playwriting (1967)
- Asiedu Yirenkyi – Playwriting (1971)
- Alexander Woo – Playwriting (1997)

==== Stage management ====
- James F. Ingalls – Stage Management (1976)
- Thomas R. Bruce – Stage Management (1979)

==== Technical design and production ====
- Michael P. Price – Technical Production (1963)

==== Theatre management ====
- Charles Dillingham – Theatre Management (1968)
- Anne Hamburger – Theatre Management (1986)
- Jenn Lindsay – Theatre Management (2004–2005; left)
- Leslie Urdang – Theatre Management (1981)
- Stephanie Ybarra – Theatre Management (2008)

==== Other ====
- Carmen Capalbo (1948)
- Michael David (1968)
- Richard Fleischer – Drama (1942)
- Ernest K. Gann – Drama (1930–1931; left)
- Elia Kazan – Drama (1933; left)
- Barnet Kellman (1972)
- Gertrude Prokosch Kurath – Drama (1930)
- Andrew Nelson Lytle – Drama (1929)
- H. C. Potter – Drama (1926)
- Burt Shevelove – Drama (1940)
- Janice Torre – Songwriting (1936)
- Max Wilk – Drama (1941)
