= David Hays (scenic designer) =

American scenic designer (1930–2026)

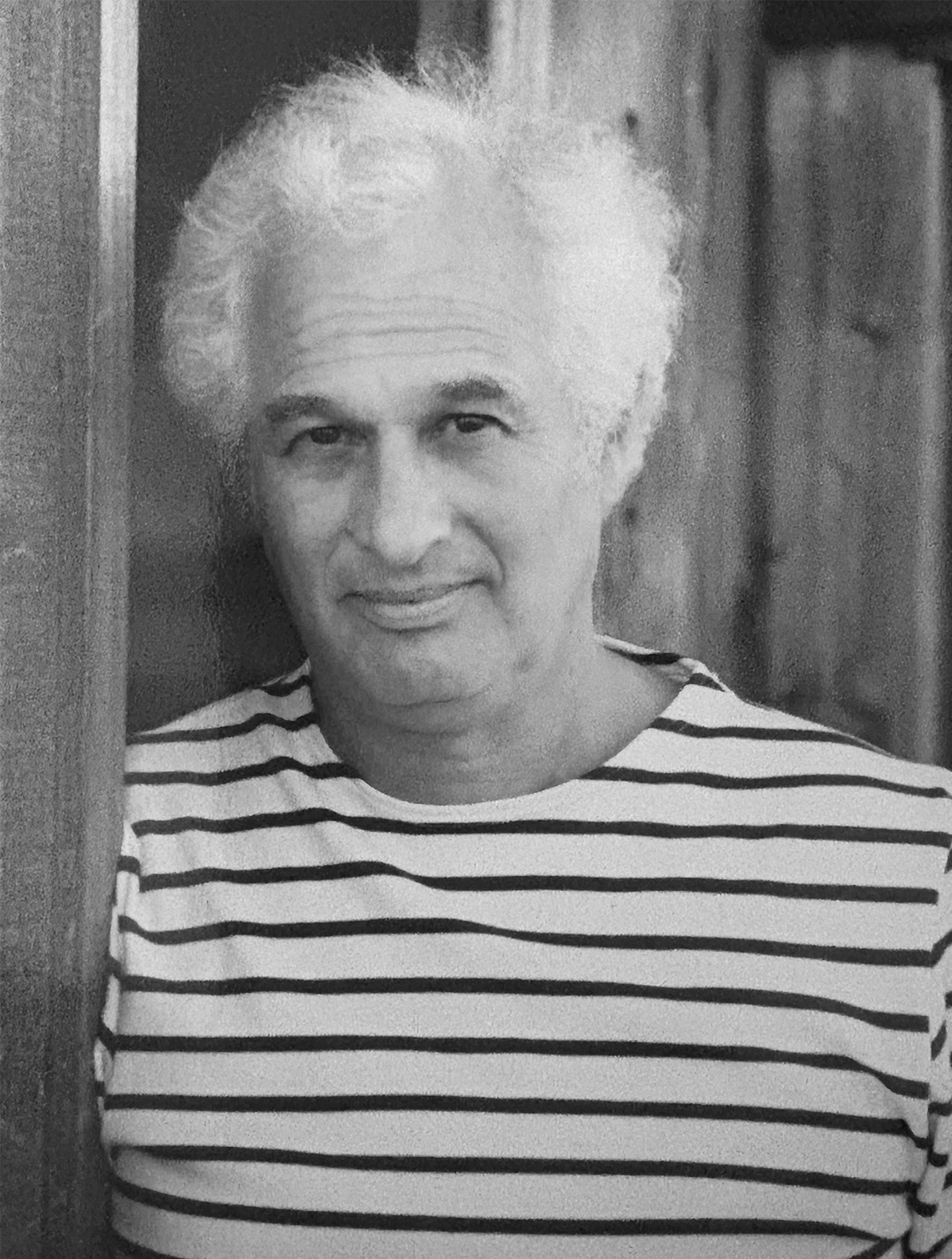
- Born: June 2, 1930; New York City, U.S.
- Died: February 15, 2026 (aged 95); Essex, Connecticut, U.S.
- Education: Harvard University (BA, MFA)
- Occupations: Scenic designer; Lighting designer; Artistic director; Author
- Years active: 1953–2026
- Known for: Founding the National Theatre of the Deaf
- Spouses: Leonore L. Hays (m. 1952; died 2000); Elaine Coleman (m. 2001; div. 2004); Nancy Varga (m. 2012)
- Children: 2

David Hays (June 2, 1930 – February 17, 2026) was an American scenic and lighting designer and the founding artistic director of the National Theatre of the Deaf (NTD). Over a career spanning five decades, he designed scenery and lighting for over 50 Broadway productions and 30 ballets for George Balanchine and the New York City Ballet. He was nominated for five Tony Awards for his stage designs.

== Early life and education ==
David Hays was born on June 2, 1930, to parents Sara (née Reich) and Mortimer Hays in Far Rockaway, Queens, New York. His father was a trial lawyer and his mother was an amateur pianist.

Hays graduated Harvard University with a degree in the history of fine arts in 1952. Following graduation, he studied in London on a Fulbright scholarship, working at the Old Vic under the mentorship of theater legends like John Gielgud and Laurence Olivier. He later attended the Yale School of Drama before transferring to Boston University, where he earned a Master of Fine Arts in theatrical design.

== Career ==
Hays began his Broadway career in the 1950s. He gained significant recognition for his collaboration with director José Quintero on the landmark 1956 revival of Eugene O'Neill's The Iceman Cometh and the original Broadway production of Long Day's Journey into Night (1956). His other notable Broadway credits included The Tenth Man (1959), All the Way Home (1960), and the Richard Rodgers musical No Strings (1962).

In 1967, inspired by his work on the Broadway production of The Miracle Worker, Hays co-founded the National Theatre of the Deaf alongside Bernard Bragg and Edna Simon Levine. The NTD integrated American Sign Language with spoken English on stage. He served as the company's artistic director for 30 years, during which time the troupe performed in all 50 U.S. states and on all seven continents. Under his leadership, the NTD received a Special Tony Award for Theatrical Excellence in 1977.

He worked with a number of notable directors, including Elia Kazan (Tartuffe) and Tyrone Guthrie (Dinner at Eight). He was inducted into the Theater Hall of Fame in 2014.

In 1995, he co-authored the bestseller My Old Man and the Sea with his son Daniel, documenting their voyage around Cape Horn through 35-foot (11 m) waves in a 25-foot (7.6 m) sloop, with the only navigational aid being a sextant.

Hays was Jewish, but was not devout while growing up. As an adult, Hays rediscovered Judaism and had a bar mitzvah, an experience he later turned into a memoir, Today I Am a Boy (2000).

== Personal life and death ==
Hays was married to Leonore (née Lee) Hays in 1952 until her death in 2000. They had two children. He married again briefly before divorcing, and in 2012 married a third time to Nancy Varga, who survived him. Hays died in Essex, Connecticut, on February 17, 2026, at the age of 95.

== Selected bibliography ==
- Hays, David; Hays, Daniel (1995). My old man and the sea: a father and son sail around Cape Horn. Chapel Hill: Algonquin Books of Chapel Hill. ISBN 978-1-56512-102-7. OCLC 815593241.
- Light on the subject: stage lighting for directors and actors --and the rest of us. New York: Limelight Editions. 1989. ISBN 978-0-87910-126-8. OCLC 1530634740.
- Passion below zero : essays from Last Chance, Idaho. Ketchum ID: Lost River Press. October 1, 1995. ISBN 978-1-885719-01-0. OCLC 34727870.
- Today I am a boy. New York: Simon & Schuster. 2000. ISBN 978-0-7432-0126-1. OCLC 44016528.
- Setting the stage: what we do, how we do it, and why. Middletown, Connecticut: Wesleyan University Press. 2017. ISBN 978-0-8195-7721-4. OCLC 983466256.
