= James Bundy =

American theatre director and teacher (born 1959)

- Born: May 8, 1959 (age 67); Boston, Massachusetts, U.S.
- Education: Harvard University (BA); London Academy of Music and Dramatic Art (BA); Yale University (MFA)
- Relatives: McGeorge Bundy (father)

James Bundy (born May 8, 1959, in Boston, Massachusetts) is an American theatre director and teacher who was the Dean of Yale School of Drama and artistic director of Yale Repertory Theatre from 2002 to 2026.

== Biography ==
=== Early life ===
Bundy was born in Boston in 1959, one of four children of McGeorge Bundy and Mary Bundy. As an actor, Bundy made his theatrical debut playing Santa Claus in a school Christmas pageant in the first grade. Bundy attended Groton School and received his AB in English and American Literature from Harvard College in 1981. He studied acting at the London Academy of Music and Dramatic Art, 1981–1984, and received his MFA in directing from Yale School of Drama in 1995.

=== Career ===
Bundy worked professionally as an actor from 1984 to 1989, appearing in productions at Magic Theatre, Woodminster Summer Musicals, San Jose Repertory Theatre, Music Hall Theater in San Francisco, Berkeley Repertory Theatre, and Oregon Shakespeare Festival.

From 1989 to 1991, he was the managing director of Cornerstone Theatre Company prior to enrolling in Yale School of Drama in 1992. He served as Associate Producing Director of The Acting Company in New York City from 1996 to 1998 and artistic director of Great Lakes Theater Festival in Cleveland, Ohio, 1998–2002.

His appointment as Dean/Artistic Director of Yale School of Drama/Yale Repertory Theatre in New Haven, Connecticut, began full-time in 2002. He was reappointed for four consecutive five-year terms in 2007, in 2011, in 2016, and again in 2021. Bundy has taught text analysis classes in Shakespeare, Molière, and Wilde; and Chekhov and Ibsen, since 2004.

His directing credits at Yale Rep include Assassins, book by John Weidman, music and lyrics by Stephen Sondheim, 2016; Happy Days by Samuel Beckett starring Dianne Wiest and Jarlath Conroy, a production which Bundy directed again at Theater for a New Audience Brooklyn, New York, in 2017; Arcadia by Tom Stoppard, 2014; Hamlet by William Shakespeare, starring Paul Giamatti, 2013; Edward Albee's A Delicate Balance, 2011; Arthur Miller's Death of a Salesman starring Charles S. Dutton, 2009; Oscar Wilde's A Woman of No Importance, 2008; Shakespeare's All's Well That Ends Well, co-directed by Mark Rucker, 2006; The Ladies of the Camellias by Lillian Groag, 2004, and The Psychic Lives of Savages by Amy Freed, 2003.

== Awards and honors ==
- Tony Award nomination, Yale Repertory Theatre: Best Play, Indecent, 2017
- National Theater Conference Outstanding Theater Award, Yale Repertory Theatre, 2014
- Tom Killen Award, Connecticut Critics Circle, 2007
- John Houseman Award, The Acting Company, 2012
- Crain's Cleveland, 40 Under 40, 1998
- Best Ensemble (Ah, Wilderness!), Bay Area Critics Circle, 1988
