= Nikos Psacharopoulos =

Nikos Psacharopoulos (Greek: Νίκος Ψαχαρόπουλος, January 18, 1928 – January 12, 1989) was a Greek-American theater producer, director, and educator.

Born Nickolas Konstantin Athanasios Psacharopoulos VII in Athens, he claimed to have organized his first theatrical troupe at age 15 under the Nazi occupation of his homeland. He moved to the United States in 1947 and attended Oberlin College where he directed productions for the Oberlin Mummers. He graduated in 1951 with a degree in art history. Three years later he received a Master of Fine Arts Degree in theater direction from the Yale Drama School. In 1955, he joined the faculty of Yale's undergraduate theater studies department and also taught in the graduate Drama School, where he remained until his death from colon cancer at age 60.

Psacharopoulos was a co-founder of the Williamstown Theater Festival (WTF) in 1955, based in the Adams Memorial Theater on the campus of Williams College. Psacharopoulos went on to serve as WTF's sole artistic executive director for 33 years, creating a professional summer theater that was more than a typical summer stock escapist operation. He was aided for many years by Tom Brennan, who served as the WTF associate director. Under Psacharopoulos' leadership, WTF specialized in the plays of Anton Chekhov and Bertolt Brecht, as well as the work of many classic American playwrights such as Tennessee Williams, Thornton Wilder, Arthur Miller, and Archibald MacLeish. Psacharopoulos traveled often between his Greek homeland and New York City, his main residence, where he staged theater productions with the Circle-in-the-Square, the New York Pro Musica, and City Opera.

Many directors and leaders of American theater were inspired by Nikos' guidance. Each year he would choose an assistant from his students at Yale or Circle in the Square NYC, to accompany him to WTF to experience their first seasons as professional directors.

Psacharopoulos died in St. John, U.S. Virgin Islands in 1989.

== Bibliography ==
- The Actor's Chekhov: Interviews with Nikos Psacharopoulos and the Company of the Williamstown Theatre Festival, on the Plays of Anton Chekhov by Jean Hackett, John Guare and Nikos Psacharopoulos
- Toward Mastery: An Acting Class With Nikos Psacharopoulos (Career Development Series) by Nikos Psacharopoulos and Jean Hackett
