= Vienna's English Theatre =

Coordinates: 48°12′30″N 16°21′11″E

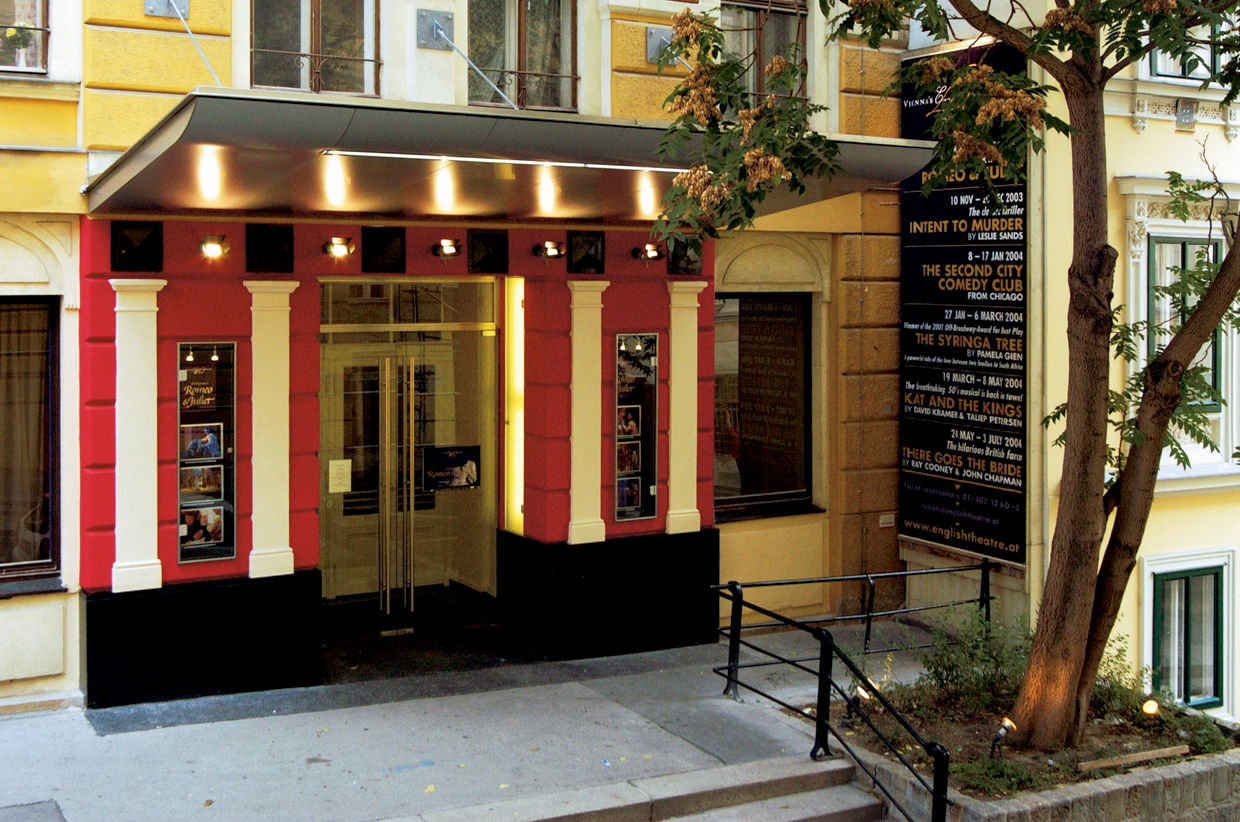
Entrance of Vienna's English Theatre

Vienna's English Theatre (VET) is the oldest foreign-language theatre in Vienna, Austria. Founded in 1963, the theatre occasionally offers works in French or Italian.

== History ==
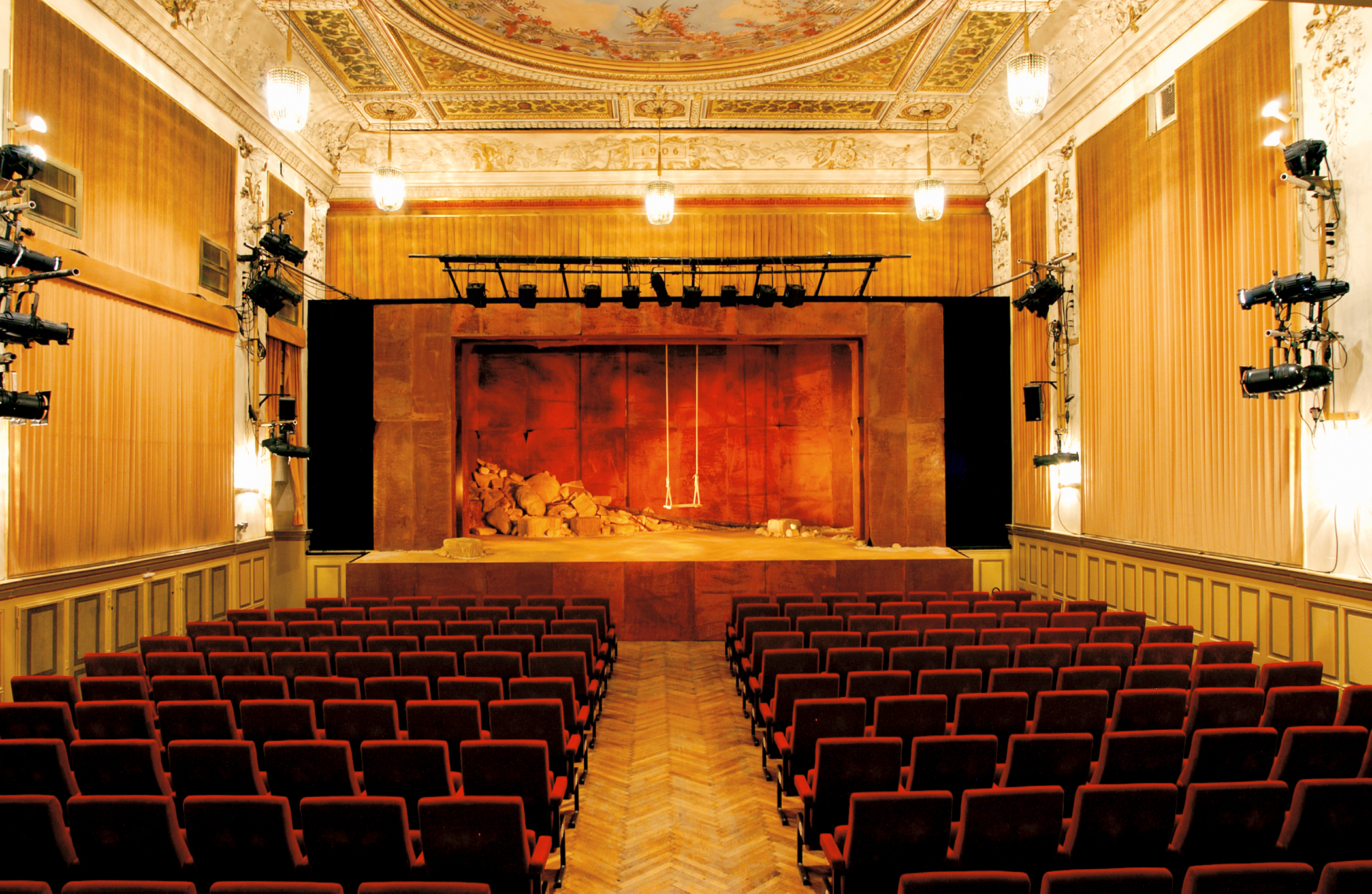
Auditorium of Vienna's English Theatre

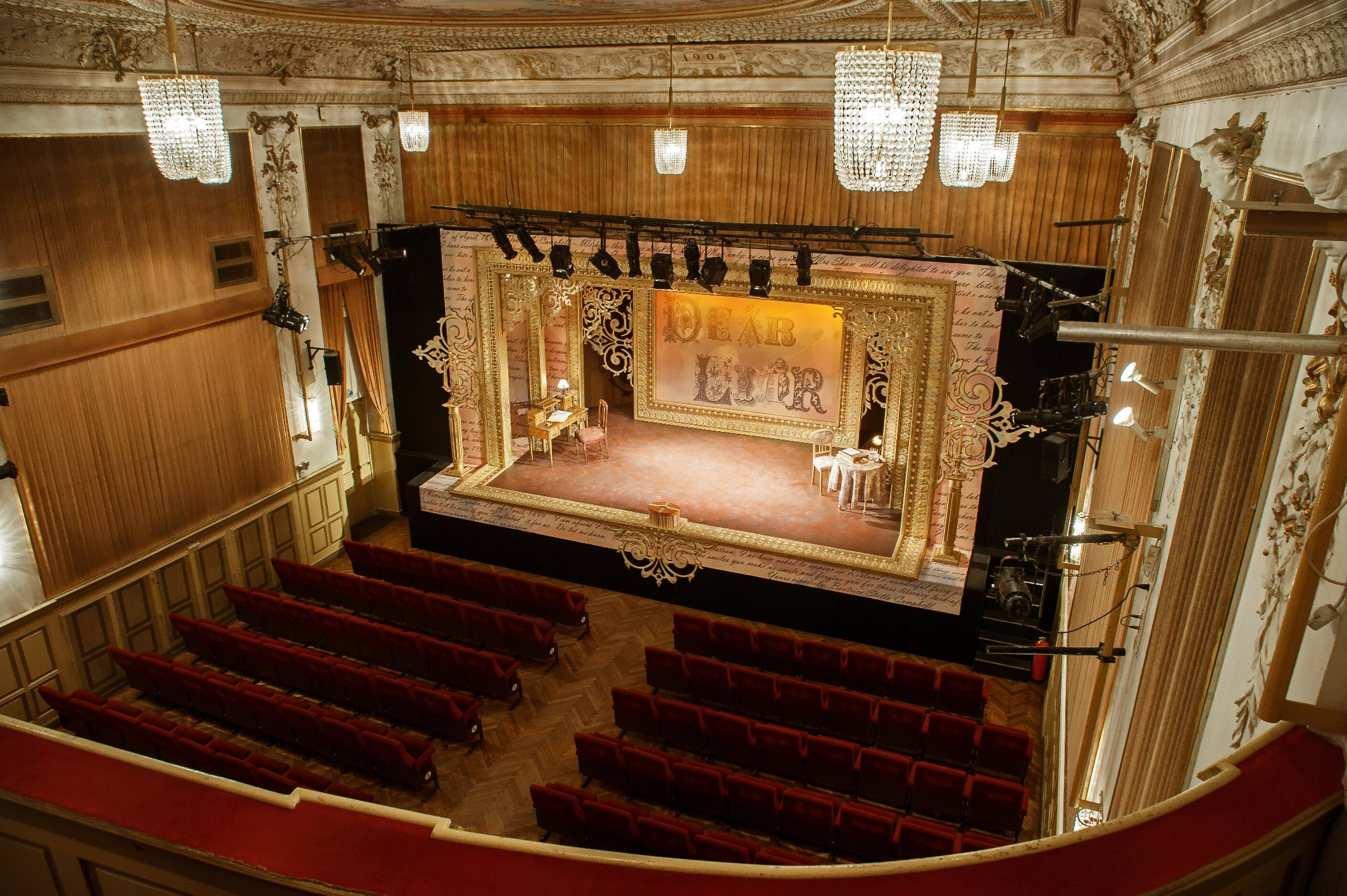
Auditorium of Vienna's English Theatre from the balcony

It was founded in 1963 by the Austrian director Franz Schafranek and his American wife, Ruth Brinkmann, an actress and graduate of the Yale University School of Drama. Originally intended as a summer theatre for English-speaking tourists, it won immediate acceptance by the Viennese public and extended its initial season to offer a year-round programme. After opening in a 99-seat playhouse in the Erzherzog Karl Palace in central Vienna, the theatre moved several times over the next ten years to accommodate its growing audience. During this time, most of the productions were directed by Franz Schafranek while Ruth Brinkmann demonstrated her acting talent and versatility in numerous roles. By 1974 the theatre had gained the support of the City of Vienna in finding its permanent home in the Josefsgasse.

== National and international recognition ==
In 1976 they presented the world premiere of Tennessee Williams’ The Red Devil Battery Sign under the playwright's direction, with Ruth Brinkmann in the leading female role. A highlight was the 1991 world premiere of Edward Albee's Pulitzer Prize–winning Three Tall Women, directed by the author, which he dedicated to the memory of Franz Schafranek after his sudden death earlier that year.

== International stars ==
Through its international recognition, the theatre has attracted stage and screen personalities to the Josefsgasse, among them Joan Fontaine, Anthony Quinn, Horst Buchholz, Linda Gray, Larry Hagman, Princess Grace of Monaco, Dame Anna Neagle, Siobhan McKenna and Judi Dench as well as Jean-Louis Barrault, Jeanne Moreau and Jean-Paul Belmondo who appeared for the Théâtre Français de Vienne. French productions were added by Dr. Schafranek beginning in 1978, and the Teatro Italiano di Vienna was established in 1985 offering original works in Italian with stars such as Vittorio Gassmann and Andrea Jonasson. With its 5000 subscribers, Vienna's English Theatre has become an integral part of Vienna's theatrical life, offering year-round productions of English and American classics, thrillers, comedies and farces as well as contemporary works.

When Ruth Brinkmann died, Julia Schafranek assumed the mantle and responsibilities of Artistic Executive Director of Vienna's English Theatre in 1997. Highlights of these recent years were Leslie Nielsen's guest appearance as Clarence Darrow, the European premiere of the 2000 Pulitzer Prize–winning play Proof by David Auburn, the South-African Musical Kat and the Kings, winner of the Olivier Award for Best New Musical 1999, Marie Jones’ Stones in His Pockets, Olivier Award 2001 for Best New Comedy, the return of the French actress Annie Girardot as Madame Marguerite, which won her the Molière for Best Actress, the European premiere of the latest play by the American dramatist Edward Albee The Goat, or Who Is Sylvia, as well as the Pulitzer Prize winners Doubt by John Patrick Shanley and God of Carnage by Yasmina Reza. Since 1992 The Second City Comedy Club, Chicago has returned annually for a guest appearance, introducing their tradition of American comedy and improvised theatre to Viennese audiences. In 2004 Vienna's English Theatre was awarded the Nestroy Theatre Prize (Special Prize) for forty years of achievement. Additionally, Vienna's English Theatre offers a programme of School Tours which travel all over Austria providing performances for nearly 250,000 students between the ages of 10 and 18.
