= Busker Alley =

- Poster for planned 1995 production; Illustration by Hilary Knight
- Music: Richard M. Sherman; Robert B. Sherman
- Lyrics: Richard M. Sherman; Robert B. Sherman
- Book: AJ Carothers
- Basis: 1938 film St. Martin's Lane
- Productions: 1995 US tour 2006 NY benefit concert

Busker Alley is a musical with music and lyrics by the Sherman Brothers and a book by AJ Carothers, based on the 1938 British film St. Martin's Lane.

Tommy Tune led a 1995 touring production as Charlie Baxter, a street entertainer in prewar London, in love with another busker, who follows her dream of becoming a star.

== Background and history ==
Brothers Robert and Richard Sherman had written the scores to several Disney movies such as Mary Poppins and The Jungle Book. In the mid-1960s, Disney staff scriptwriter AJ Carothers rediscovered the motion picture St. Martin's Lane and approached the Sherman brothers with the idea of purchasing the rights to the film and making a stage musical out of it. The Shermans and AJ Carothers did just that in 1969, writing the musical Piccadilly. But nothing more became of it until 1982 when interest was rekindled, and the project was rewritten and renamed, Blow Us a Kiss. Still, nothing happened with the property for nearly a decade until interest was again sparked, and Tommy Tune became attached to the show.

=== 1995 U.S. tour ===
With a major Broadway star attached to the project, the show was finally launched with yet a new name: Busker Alley opened in April 1995 at the Macauley Theatre, Louisville, Kentucky as the start of a 16-city tour. The musical starred Tune and Darcie Roberts, Brent Barrett, Marcia Lewis, and The Huber Marionettes. Jeff Calhoun directed and choreographed, with sets by Tony Walton.

The producers planned to bring the production to Broadway in November 1995 at the St. James Theatre. Artist LeRoy Neiman created a 40-foot mural for Busker Alley on the façade of the theater, and the cast performed a number from the show at the 1995 Tony Awards ceremony. The production had numerous setbacks during the tour as well as two more name changes, including Stage Door Charley (unilaterally chosen by the producer's wife). The show finished its pre-Broadway tour as Buskers.

Over the course of months-long out-of-town tryouts, with some severe reviews, the lukewarm reception prompted an August meeting for rewrites by Peter Stone, and a retooling by Mr. Tune, whose role as a consultant expanded into more directorial tasks. Six weeks prior to the musical's Broadway debut, Tune broke his foot during a performance in Tampa, Florida. Although Tune would have healed in time, the investors pulled out. The tour ended on October 8, 1995 in Tampa and the show never reached New York.

=== Revivals ===
In 2003 AJ Carothers and the Sherman Brothers revised their book and song score, changing the name back to Busker Alley.

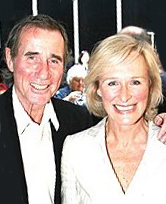
Jim Dale and Glenn Close in 2006 performing Busker Alley.

On November 13, 2006 the York Theatre Company presented a one-night-only benefit concert performance of Busker Alley at the Kaye Playhouse at Hunter College. Jim Dale starred as "Charlie Baxter". Glenn Close appeared as "Dame Libby St. Albans" framing the show's main plot. (Dale and Close originated the roles of P.T. Barnum and his wife, Charity Barnum, in Barnum in 1980.) Also in the cast were: Jessica Grové, George S. Irving, Simon Jones, Noah Racey, John Bolton, Robert Fitch, Anne Rogers, Michael Lane Trautman, Cristy Candler, Diane Wasnak and Bonzer the dog. Tony Walton directed the production, with Lisa Shriver as choreographer. Aaron Gandy was the conductor, and Mark York the pianist. A recording of the benefit concert was released by Jay Records in 2007.

Busker Alley had been announced for a Broadway production for the 2008–09 season, with Tony Walton as director and designer and Jim Dale to star. In December 2008, the producers announced that the musical would be delayed. On August 25, 2009, the producers announced a collective withdrawal: returning money to investors and releasing sponsors from their obligations.

== Songs ==
Source: allmusicals

- "Busker Alley"
- "Blow Us A Kiss"
- "Hula Love Song"
- "When Do I Get Mine?"
- "Strays"
- "Mates"
- "What To Do With 'Er"
- "He Has A Way/She Has A Way"
- "When the Moonlight's Bright In Brighton"
- "Crazy 'Appy Tears"
- "Tap Happy Feet"
- "Baby Me"
- "Ordinary Couples"
- "I'm On the Inside"
- "Where Are The Faces (Charlie the Busker)"
- "A Million Miles From You"
- "Tin Whistle Tune"
- "The World of Beautiful Girls"
- "All Around the Town"
- "Paddle Your Own Canoe"
- "Why the Tears?"
- "Waiting for Ann"
- "Never Trust A Lady"
