= Tony Straiges =

Tony Straiges (born October 31, 1942) is a scenic designer for the stage and ballet. He has designed the sets for 17 Broadway musicals, plays and specials. His sets "often have a sparse elegance or sense of fantasy about them." Robert Brustein said of Straiges: "Today, he is considered one of the visual poets of the stage." Straiges attended the Yale School of Drama at Yale University.

== Career ==
His first Broadway production was Timbuktu! in 1978, and recently he designed the sets for Enchanted April in 2003. He provided the scenic supervision for the 1985 concert version of Follies. Off-Broadway productions include Chasing Manet at Primary Stages in 2009. His first off-Broadway production was Glance of a Landscape in 1975, at Playwrights Horizons. He designed the sets for the stage musical Meet Me in St. Louis at the Irish Repertory Theatre in 2006. He also designed the set for the 1991 Broadway play I Hate Hamlet.

Straiges designed the set for Sunday in the Park with George (1984), and won the 1984 Tony Award, Best Scenic Design, and Drama Desk Award, Outstanding Set Design for his work. Frank Rich wrote that the set was "fantastic", and "What Mr. Lapine, his designers and the special-effects wizard Bran Ferren have arranged is simply gorgeous."

Straiges designed the set for Into the Woods (1987), for which he was nominated for the Tony Award, Best Scenic Design and Drama Desk Award, Outstanding Set Design. Frank Rich wrote of the set "The designer, Tony Straiges, transports us from a mock-proscenium set redolent of 19th-century picturebook illustration into a thick, asymmetrical, Sendakesque woods whose Rorschach patterns, eerily lighted by Richard Nelson, keep shifting to reveal hidden spirits and demons."

He has designed for many regional theatres, including Yale Repertory Theatre, New Haven, Connecticut (1974–77, 1978–79, and 1981–82). A sample of productions for that theatre included The Rise And Fall Of The City Of Mahogonny (1974), Troilus And Cressida (1976), and Tales From The Vienna Woods (1978). His work for Center Stage, Baltimore, Maryland included Lady Windermere's Fan in 2004 and On the Verge, or the Geography of Yearning in 1984. He designed for Arena Stage, Washington, DC in 1976-81, including The Winter's Tale in 1979 and 1982–83, and in 1985 designed Women And Water. He designs for the Alley Theatre, Houston Texas.

He also designs sets for ballet companies, including Pacific Northwest Ballet, Joffrey Ballet, and American Ballet Theatre.

A collection of 18 models of Straiges' set designs is in the Ohio State University Library.
