= Franz Schafranek =

Czech theatre director (1930–1991)

- Born: 6 February 1930; Nové Hrady, Czechoslovakia
- Died: 4 June 1991 (aged 61); Vienna, Austria
- Education: Stockholm University
- Occupation: Theatre director

Franz Schafranek (6 February 1930 – 4 June 1991) was a Czech-born Austrian theatre director who, in 1963, founded Vienna's English Theatre, located in Vienna, Austria.

== Early life and education ==
Schafranek was born in Nové Hrady, Czechoslovakia.

To study theatre, he moved to Austria and then to Sweden after World War II. He graduated summa cum laude from Stockholm University, located in Stockholm, where he attracted the attention of Swedish filmmaker Ingmar Bergman.

== Career ==
After serving under Bergman as assistant director, Schafranek went on to Berlin. He gained insights and experience working with German playwright and poet Bertolt Brecht at Brecht's Theater on the Schiffbauerdamm.

He soon moved back to Vienna, and founded Vienna's English Theatre with his wife.

Within a few years, the theatre had become a massive success in the Austrian theatrical scene. Schafranek staged world premieres of works by American playwrights, including Tennessee Williams, William Saroyan and Edward Albee, as well as numerous continental premieres of British and American dramas. He also brought prominent stars of stage and screen to perform on his Josefsgasse stage.

Following the success of Vienna's English Theatre, Schafranek founded the Theatre Français de Vienne, and in 1985 the Teatro Italiano di Vienna.

== Death ==
In June 1991, Schafranek died of a heart attack in Vienna.
