= Tony Walton =

British costume and set designer (1934–2022)

- Born: Anthony John Walton; 24 October 1934; Walton-on-Thames, Surrey, England
- Died: 2 March 2022 (aged 87); New York City, US
- Education: Radley College; Slade School of Fine Art
- Occupations: Art director; set designer; costume designer
- Years active: 1957–2007
- Spouses: Julie Andrews (m. 1959; div. 1968); Gen LeRoy (m. 1991)
- Children: Emma Walton Hamilton

Anthony John Walton (24 October 1934 – 2 March 2022) was a British costume designer and set designer. He won three Tony Awards, an Academy Award, and an Emmy Award. He received three Tony Awards for Pippin (1973), House of Blue Leaves (1986), and Guys and Dolls (1992). For his work in movies, he won an Academy Award for Best Production Design, for All That Jazz (1979), and nominations for Mary Poppins (1964), Murder on the Orient Express (1974), and The Wiz (1978). For his work in television, he won a Primetime Emmy Award, for Death of a Salesman (1985).

== Early life ==
Walton was born in Walton-on-Thames, Surrey, England, on 24 October 1934. His father, Lancelot, was an orthopedic surgeon and his mother, Hilda, was a homemaker. He fell in love with the theatre as child when on a family trip to a pantomime. At the age of 12, he met Julie Andrews after he had watched her in a performance of Humpty Dumpty in the West End. She was 11 at the time. He found her number in the telephone book and asked for her address so he could send her some pictures. The two became good friends from this point.

Walton attended Radley College in Oxfordshire where he studied Greek and Latin. Here he put on some ambitious marionette shows, one of which was attended by the English artist John Piper. He came to find Walton at the end of the show, and told him he should go into stage design. Walton followed his advice and studied at the Slade School of Fine Art in London. He spent two years of mandatory military training with the Royal Air Force, as a trainee pilot in Ontario, Canada. After completing his National Service, he headed to New York to join Julie Andrews, who was making a name for herself on Broadway.

== Career ==
He began his career in 1957 with the stage design for Noël Coward's off-Broadway production of Conversation Piece. Throughout the late 1950s and early 1960s, he designed for the New York and London stage.

Walton entered the motion pictures business through Walt Disney, after Disney met him back stage after a performance of Camelot. Julie Andrews, who was now his fiancé, was already in line to play the part of Mary Poppins in the classic film. Disney offered to look at his portfolio and later ended up hiring Walton as a costume designer, set designer, and visual consultant for Mary Poppins. He was not allowed to make any reference to the famous illustrations that Mary Shepard had done for the original book in 1934, as the rights to the story did not include this. The Sherman brothers, who were working on the songs for the movie, suggested that he transposed the era of the story from the 1930s to the Edwardian era, to ensure he avoided any accidental replications. He made the set realistic, paying attention to detail, as he was always annoyed by sets that didn't look real. He also alluded to Mary Poppins' "secret life", by making her clothes grey or black on the outside, but with brightly coloured linings and flashes of crimson. For this he received an Academy Award nomination for Best Costume Design (Color).

Walton continued to work in the film industry as a costume designer and set designer working on films such as A Funny Thing Happened on the Way to the Forum (1966), The Boy Friend (1971), and Equus (1977). Walton received further Academy Award nominations for his work on Murder on the Orient Express (1974), and The Wiz (1978). He won his only Academy Award for his work as an Art Director on Bob Fosse's musical film All That Jazz (1979).

In 1983, Diana Ross, the star of the film The Wiz, chose Walton to design the stage set for her 1983 Central Park concert, "For One & For All". Broadcast worldwide on the Showtime cable network, the concert special, over the course of two days, featured an on-site audience of over 1,200,000 on the park's Great Lawn.

In 1989, the American Museum of the Moving Image showcased over 30 years of his work for films, television, and theatre in the exhibit Tony Walton: Designing for Stage and Screen, including drawings, models, and photographs from his early plays including the Regency-style Conversation Piece from 1957 and "his evocation of a London street" for the 1964 film Mary Poppins.

In December 2005, for their annual birthday celebration to 'The Master', The Noël Coward Society invited Walton as the guest celebrity to lay flowers in front of Coward's statue at New York's Gershwin Theatre, thereby commemorating the 106th birthday of Sir Noël.

Inspiration for Disney's Winnie the Pooh

Walton gave the Sherman Brothers the insight and inspiration for songs in Winnie the Pooh and the Honey Tree, as the Brothers explained in their joint autobiography, Walt's Time:

Walt said 'Read the Pooh stories and let me know what you think.' We tried, but the stories just weren't coming through to us. At that time designer Tony Walton was working on Poppins. He was English-born, and he was about our age, so we asked him to give us some insight on the Pooh character. His eyes lit up. 'Winnie the Pooh?', he said. 'I love Winnie the Pooh! Of course I'll help you!' Three hours later, he was still talking about Pooh, inspiring us no end. He explained how he had been a chubby little boy, and had felt very insecure. But Winnie the Pooh was his buddy, because Pooh was pudgy and proud of it. Pooh was probably the only character in the world who exercised to gain weight! Pooh was a wonderful, lovable friend who would never let you down or turn his back on you. Soon, we started to fall in love with Pooh ourselves. Our songs for Winnie the Pooh were truly a love affair, thanks to A.A. Milne and to Tony Walton.

== Personal life and death ==
Walton married his childhood sweetheart Julie Andrews in 1959, and together they had a daughter, Emma Walton Hamilton. Walton said that he fell in love with Andrews when they were children and he saw her playing the egg in a theatre production of Humpty Dumpty. They divorced in 1968 but remained close friends. Walton, Andrews, and their daughter worked together professionally several times, with Walton illustrating several children's books written by Andrews and their daughter.

Walton married Gen LeRoy in 1991. He died from complications of a stroke at his apartment in New York City on 2 March 2022, at the age of 87.

== Credits ==
=== Film ===
Year	Title	Set Designer	Costume Designer	Note
1964	Mary Poppins	Yes	Yes	
1966	Fahrenheit 451	Yes	Yes	
1966	A Funny Thing Happened on the Way to the Forum	Yes	Yes	
1968	Petulia	Yes	Yes	
1968	The Sea Gull	Yes	Yes	
1971	The Boy Friend	Yes	No	
1974	Murder on the Orient Express	Yes	Yes	
1977	Equus	Yes	Yes	
1978	The Wiz	Yes	Yes	
1980	Just Tell Me What You Want	Yes	Yes	
1981	Prince of the City	Yes	No	
1982	Deathtrap	Yes	Yes	
1984	The Goodbye People	Yes	Yes	
1986	Heartburn	Yes	No	
1987	The Glass Menagerie	No	Yes	
1991	Regarding Henry	Yes	No	

=== Television ===
Year	Title	Set Designer	Costume Designer	Note
1959	Theatre Night	Yes	Yes	Episode: "Fool's Paradise"
1959	The Julie Andrews Show	Yes	No	3 episodes
1981	Pippin: His Life and Times	Yes	No	Television movie
1983	Diana Ross Live in Central Park	Yes	No	Television concert
1985	Death of a Salesman	Yes	No	Television movie
1987	American Playhouse	Yes	Yes	Episode: "House of Blue Leaves"
2000	The Man Who Came to Dinner	Yes	No	Television movie
2003	Our Town	Yes	Yes	Television movie

=== Theatre ===
Year	Production	Notes
1961	Once There Was a Russian	
1962	A Funny Thing Happened on the Way to the Forum	
1963	The Rehearsal	
1964	Golden Boy	
1967	The Apple Tree	
1972	Pippin	
1973	Shelter	
1975	Chicago	
1980	A Day in Hollywood / A Night in the Ukraine	
1981	Sophisticated Ladies	
1984	The Real Thing	
1984	Hurlyburly	
1985	I'm Not Rappaport	
1986	House of Blue Leaves	
1986	The Front Page	
1986	Social Security	
1987	Anything Goes	
1989	Lend Me a Tenor	
1989	Grand Hotel	
1990	Six Degrees of Separation	
1991	The Will Rogers Follies	
1992	Death and the Maiden	
1992	Conversations with My Father	
1992	Four Baboons Adoring the Sun	
1992	Guys and Dolls	
1992	Tommy Tune Tonight	
1993	She Loves Me	
1993	A Grand Night for Singing	
1993	Laughter on the 23rd Floor	
1994	Picnic	
1994	A Christmas Carol	
1995	Busker Alley	Also director in 2006
1995	Company	
1995	Moonlight	
1996	A Fair Country	
1996	A Fair Country	
1996	A Funny Thing Happened on the Way to the Forum	
1996	The Shawl	
1996	The Shawl	
1997	Steel Pier	
1997	King David	
1997	1776	
1998	The Cripple of Inishmaan	
1999	Annie Get Your Gun	
2000	On Raftery's Hill	
2000	Uncle Vanya	
2000	The Man Who Came to Dinner	
2000	Taller Than a Dwarf	
2002	Our Town	
2003	Nobody Don't Like Yogi	
2003	The Boy Friend	
2005	The Boy Friend	National Tour
2006	Well	
2007	The Sleeping Beauty	ABT, Metropolitan Opera
2007	A Tale of Two Cities	

Walton later diversified into directing, with productions of:

- Orson Welles' Moby Dick—Rehearsed, 2005
- Oscar Wilde's The Importance of Being Earnest, 1996
- Noël Coward In Two Keys, 1996
- George Bernard Shaw's Major Barbara, 1997
- Missing Footage, 1999
- Ooops! The Big Apple Circus Stage Show, 1999
- Where's Charley?, 2004
- After the Ball, 2004
- Busker Alley, 2006

== Awards and nominations ==
=== Academy Awards ===
Year	Award	Nominated work	Result
1964	Best Costume Design	Mary Poppins	Nominated
1974	Best Costume Design	Murder on the Orient Express	Nominated
1978	Best Costume Design	The Wiz	Nominated
1978	Best Art Direction	The Wiz	Nominated
1979	Best Art Direction	All That Jazz	Won

=== Emmy Awards ===
Year	Category	Nominated work	Result
1985	Outstanding Art Direction for a Miniseries or Movie	Death of a Salesman	Won

=== Tony Awards ===
Year	Category	Nominated work	Result
1967	Best Costume Design	The Apple Tree	Nominated
1973	Best Scenic Design	Pippin	Won
1976	Best Scenic Design	Chicago	Nominated
1980	Best Scenic Design	A Day in Hollywood / A Night in the Ukraine	Nominated
1984	Best Scenic Design	The Real Thing	Nominated
1986	Best Scenic Design	The House of Blue Leaves	Won
1987	Best Scenic Design	The Front Page	Nominated
1988	Best Scenic Design	Anything Goes	Nominated
1988	Best Costume Design	Anything Goes	Nominated
1989	Best Scenic Design	Lend Me a Tenor	Nominated
1990	Best Scenic Design	Grand Hotel	Nominated
1991	Best Scenic Design	The Will Rogers Follies	Nominated
1992	Best Scenic Design	Guys and Dolls	Won
1994	Best Scenic Design	She Loves Me	Nominated
1997	Best Scenic Design	Steel Pier	Nominated
2000	Best Scenic Design	Uncle Vanya	Nominated
