= I Hate Hamlet =

1991 play written by Paul Rudnick

- Original language: English
- Written by: Paul Rudnick
- Characters: Andrew Rally; John Barrymore; Lillian Troy; Felicia Dantine; Deirdre McDavey; Gary Peter Lefkowitz
- Genre: Comedy
- Setting: New York City

Premiere
- Date: 8 April 1991
- Place: Walter Kerr Theatre; New York City

I Hate Hamlet is a comedy-drama written in 1991 by Paul Rudnick.

== Plot ==
Set in John Barrymore's old apartment in New York City – at the time, the author's real-life home – the play follows successful television actor Andrew Rally as he struggles with taking on the dream role of Hamlet, dealing with a girlfriend who is keeping a firm grip on her chastity, and playing host to the ghost of John Barrymore, who, clothed as Hamlet, has come back to earth for the sole purpose of convincing Rally to play the part. Real estate agent Felicia Dantine convinces Rally to stay in the apartment and hold a seance.

Barrymore proves to be very convincing (challenging Andrew to a sword fight in the middle of the New York loft), and Andrew decides to play Hamlet. But when a Hollywood friend shows up offering Andrew a new role in a television pilot, with a potentially large salary and fame, Andrew is forced to choose between Shakespeare, whom his girlfriend loves, or television, where he is loved by millions.

== Original production ==
The play was originally produced on Broadway in the Walter Kerr Theatre, opening on 8 April 1991. The show was directed by Michael Engler, set design Tony Straiges, costume design Jane Greenwood, lighting design Paul Gallo, sound design, and fight choreography B. H. Barry. The cast starred Caroline Aaron (Felicia Dantine), Evan Handler (Andrew Rally), Jane Adams (Deirdre McDavey), Celeste Holm (Lillian Troy), Nicol Williamson (John Barrymore), and Adam Arkin (Gary Peter Leftkowitz).

== Controversy ==
Nicol Williamson, who played the role of John Barrymore in the initial Broadway production, was notoriously mercurial, and gradually alienated most of his fellow cast and crewmembers. This animosity culminated in an injury to co-star Evan Handler during an onstage sword fight.

Evan Handler, a co-star of "I Hate Hamlet," left the stage near the end of the first act Thursday night, gave his notice, and walked out of the Walter Kerr Theater. Mr. Handler's unplanned departure came after a dueling scene with Nicol Williamson, the play's star, who apparently ignored the choreography and struck Mr. Handler on the back with the flat part of his sword. Andrew Mutnick, Mr. Handler's understudy, finished the performance.

Paul Rudnick later detailed Williamson's deterioration in a 2008 article for the New Yorker.

== Awards and nominations ==
=== Original Broadway production ===
Year	Award	Category	Nominee	Result
1991	Drama Desk Award	Outstanding Featured Actress in a Play	Jane Adams	Nominated
1991	Tony Award	Best Featured Actor in a Play	Adam Arkin	Nominated
1991	Theatre World Award		Jane Adams; Adam Arkin	Won
