= Marjorie B. Kellogg =

American theatre set designer (born 1946)

- Born: 1946 (age 79–80); Cambridge, Massachusetts, U.S.
- Education: Vassar College
- Occupations: Author; theatre set designer
- Website: marjoriebkellogg.com

Marjorie Bradley Kellogg (born 1946) is an American theatre set designer as well as an author. She was born in Cambridge, Massachusetts, and graduated from Vassar College in 1967.

== Novelist ==
Kellogg is the author of a tetralogy of fantasy novels, The Dragon Quartet. The series feature four elemental dragons (Earth, Air, Fire, and Water), and each dragon has a human companion. The series begins in medieval Europe and travels on to the future, as the world is embroiled in a war that pits the forces of greed and fanaticism against the dragons and their guides and those who seek to restore a natural balance.

The four books of The Dragon Quartet are:

1. The Book of Earth
2. The Book of Water
3. The Book of Fire
4. The Book of Air

Other books:

- Lear's Daughters
- Harmony
- A Rumor of Angels
- Glimmer (October 2021)

== Set designer ==
Marjorie Bradley Kellogg is also a notable theatre set designer, who has designed on Broadway, as well as Off Broadway, and regionally. She designed the Broadway sets for Any Given Day by Frank Gilroy, the George C. Scott revival of On Borrowed Time, Lucifer’s Child starring Julie Harris, American Buffalo starring Al Pacino, Da, Requiem for a Heavyweight, Arsenic and Old Lace, Steaming, and The Best Little Whorehouse in Texas, Saint Joan, The Seagull, Joe Egg, A Month of Sundays, and Moose Murders. Broadway designs for Circle in the Square include Spokesong, Heartbreak House and Present Laughter.

Off-Broadway, Kellogg has designed for the New York Shakespeare Festival, The Manhattan Theatre Club, Playwrights Horizons, the Roundabout Theatre, CSC and The Talking Band.

She designed Passions, at the Glimmerglass Festival (2013), and Othello, at the Guthrie Theatre in Minneapolis (2014).

She received the Mary L. Murphy Award for Excellence in Design and shared the first Michael Merritt Award for Design and Collaboration in 1994. Other honors were the Boston Theatre Critics Circle Award, the Los Angeles Drama-Logue awards for 1988 and 1991, and a New York Drama Desk nomination for both the 1982–83 and 1983–84 seasons. She was a 1992-94 Pew Charitable Trust Residency fellow with the Alliance Theatre in Atlanta, Georgia.

She has taught at Princeton University, Columbia University, and Colgate University. Her stage adaptation of Madeleine L'Engle's A Wrinkle in Time was produced at the Children's Theatre Company in Minneapolis, and her musical, Livin’ in the Garden, was produced at the Alliance Theatre in 1997.
