= Peter Larkin (production designer) =

American production designer (1926–2019)

- Born: Peter Sydney Larkin; August 26, 1926; Boston, Massachusetts, U.S.
- Died: December 16, 2019 (aged 93); Bridgehampton, New York, U.S.
- Education: Deerfield Academy; Yale University
- Occupation(s): Scenic designer, production designer
- Spouse: Racelle Strick
- Parent: Oliver Waterman Larkin
- Relatives: Wesley Strick (stepson)

Peter Sydney Larkin (August 25, 1926 – December 16, 2019) was an American scenic and production designer.

== Early life ==
Larkin was born in 1926 in Boston, Massachusetts, the son of Ruth Lily (McIntire) and Oliver Waterman Larkin, an art historian. Larkin was educated at the Deerfield Academy and Yale University.

== Career ==
Larkin first designed the set of the 1951 Broadway adaptation of The Wild Duck by Henrik Ibsen. Over the course of his career, he was a scenic or production designer for Dial M for Murder, Peter Pan, The Teahouse of the August Moon and No Time for Sergeants, Tootsie, and Get Shorty. He won four Tony Awards for Best Scenic Design.

== Personal life and death ==
Larkin married Racelle Strick, a painter who died in 2008. His stepson, Wesley Strick, is a screenwriter. Larkin resided in Bridgehampton, New York, where he died on December 16, 2019, at age 93.
