= Oliver W. Larkin =

American art historian and educator

Oliver Waterman Larkin (August 17, 1896 – December 17, 1970) was an American art historian and educator. He won the 1950 Pulitzer Prize for History for his book Art and Life in America.

== Life and work ==
Larkin was born in Medford, Massachusetts, the son of Charles Ernest Larkin, a collector and dealer of antiques, and Kate Mary Waterman. He had two brothers and a sister. He grew up in Medford, and later in Georgetown, Massachusetts, where in 1914 he graduated with honors from the Perley Free School. By this time he had already begun to show his interest in the arts. He enrolled in Harvard University where he majored in French and Latin. He received his B.A. in 1918. He won several scholarships as an undergraduate and was elected to Phi Beta Kappa in his senior year.

He served in the United States Army from 1918 to 1919 during World War I, as a private in the Medical Corps of the 73d Infantry Regiment. He obtained his M.A. from Harvard in 1919. He would return two years later as an assistant fine arts.

During this time he also directed plays and designed scenery for Lincoln House in Boston. He married, on July 30, 1925, to Ruth Lily McIntire of Dedham, Massachusetts. They had one son, scenic and production designer Peter Larkin.

Larkin began teaching art history at Smith College from 1924. He was inclined to teach on account of his father and encouraged by his art teachers at Harvard. He was an associate professor by 1926, and in 1931 a full professor. He briefly also taught at Iowa State University in 1925 and 1926. He was later named Jessie Wells Post Professor of Art. In 1950 and 1955 Larkin lectured for European students at the Harvard Student Council's seminars on American studies in Salzburg. He retired from Smith College in 1964, as professor emeritus.

Oliver W. Larkin died in Northampton, Massachusetts on December 17, 1970, after a long illness.

== Writing career ==
Larkin authored numerous articles and book reviews, contributing to many publications including Theatre Arts, Magazine of Art, Saturday Review of Literature, College Art Journal, School and Society, Antiques, Stage, and the William and Mary Quarterly. He is best known, however, for his work Art and Life in America. He began work on the book in 1944, at the suggestion of his publisher, but rewrote it at least three times over the next five years. The work traces the development of American art from the seventeenth century on, wherein he considers not only the chronological developments but also following cultural and social changes. He also gives particular attention to the idea of democracy. It is actually a series of six books, divided by period and each further broken down into two or three sections. It was published in fall 1949 to much critical acclaim.

In 1950 the work won the Pulitzer Prize for History. It was the first time a work on the history of visual arts had won the award. Art and Life in America was further revised and expanded in 1960. Color plates were added and it was updated to include art in the 1950s. He later wrote two more books, both of which were about artists. The first, Samuel F. B. Morse and American Democratic Art, focused on Morse's early career as a painter. The second, written after his retirement, was Daumier, Man of His Time, which related the works of Honoré Daumier to the art movements of his time.
