= Ming Cho Lee =

Chinese-American set designer (1930–2020)

- Born: October 3, 1930; Shanghai, China
- Died: October 24, 2020 (aged 90); Manhattan, New York City, NY, United States
- Occupations: Set designer, professor
- Spouse: Elizabeth (Betsy) Lee
- Children: Richard Lee, Christopher Lee, David Lee
- Parent(s): Lee Tsu Fa; Tang Ing
- Relatives: Lee Tsu Fa (grandfather)

Chinese name
- Traditional Chinese: 李名覺
- Simplified Chinese: 李名觉
Transcriptions
Standard Mandarin
- Hanyu Pinyin: Lǐ Míngjué
Wu
- Romanization: Wu Chinese pronunciation: [li miŋkoʔ]

Ming Cho Lee (Chinese: 李名覺; pinyin: Lǐ Míngjué; October 3, 1930 – October 23, 2020) was a Chinese-American theatrical set designer and professor at the Yale School of Drama.

== Personal life ==
Lee was born on Oct. 3, 1930, in Shanghai, China to Lee Tsu Fa and Tang Ing. Lee, whose father (Lee Tsu Fa) was a Yale University graduate (1918), moved to the United States in 1949 and attended Occidental College.

Lee married Elizabeth (Rapport) Lee in 1958. They had three sons Richard, Christopher, and David.

== Career ==
Lee first worked on Broadway as a second assistant set designer to Jo Mielziner on The Most Happy Fella in 1956. His first Broadway play as Scenic Designer was The Moon Besieged in 1962; he went on to design the sets for over 20 Broadway shows, including Mother Courage and Her Children, King Lear, The Glass Menagerie, The Shadow Box, and For Colored Girls Who Have Considered Suicide When the Rainbow Is Enuf.

He also designed sets for opera (including eight productions for the Metropolitan Opera and thirteen for the New York City Opera), ballet (including Firebird, Carmina Burana, Silver Lining and Swan Lake for Pacific Northwest Ballet), and regional theatres such as Arena Stage, the Mark Taper Forum, and the Guthrie Theater.

He designed over 30 productions for Joseph Papp at The Public Theater, including the original Off-Broadway production of Hair (musical). Starting in 1969, Lee taught at the Yale School of Drama, where he was co-chair of the Design Department. In February 2017, he announced that he would be retiring at the end of the fall semester. He was on the Board of Directors for The Actors Center in Manhattan. Lee is the subject of Ming Cho Lee: A Life in Design by Arnold Aronson, which was published by TCG Books in 2014. In 2013, the Yale school of Architecture and School of Drama staged a retrospective of his work at the architecture gallery.

== Awards and honors ==
- Lee was inducted into the American Theater Hall of Fame in 1998.
- He was awarded the National Medal of Arts in 2002.
- In 1995, he won the Obie Award for Sustained Excellence for his consistent and valuable contributions to the theatrical community.
- He won the Tony Award in 1983 for the play K2.
- Lee was awarded a lifetime achievement Tony Award in 2013.
- Drama Desk Award for Outstanding Set Design
- The Helen Hayes Award:
- Six awards for Outstanding Set Design, Resident Production, from 1996-2002.
- The Helen Hayes Tribute Award (2006)

== See also ==
- Chinese in New York City

== Bibliography ==
- Aronson, Arnold. Ming Cho Lee: A Life in Design. New York: Theatre Communications Group, 2014. ISBN 9781559364614
