= William and Jean Eckart =

William and Jean Eckart were a husband-and-wife team of theatre designers in the 1950s and 1960s. They designed sets, costumes, and lighting for many productions, including Mame, Here's Love, Damn Yankees, Once Upon a Mattress, The Fig Leaves Are Falling, and The Golden Apple.

== History ==
William Eckart was born October 21, 1920, in New Iberia, Louisiana and died on January 24, 2000, in Dallas, Texas, aged 79. His wife Jean was born on August 18, 1921, in Glencoe, Illinois and died on September 6, 1993, aged 72.

The couple received three Tony Award nominations: for Best Scenic Design of a Musical for Fiorello! and Best Musical (as producers) for Once Upon a Mattress in 1960 and for Best Scenic Design for Mame in 1966.

The couple taught at Southern Methodist University after their Broadway careers ended.

In 2006, a book entitled The Performing Set: The Broadway Designs of William and Jean Eckart by Andrew Harris was published. It includes sketches from every show the Eckarts designed.
