= Heidi Ettinger =

American theatre producer and set designer

Heidi Ettinger, also known by her former married name Heidi Landesman, is an American theatre producer and set designer. She studied at Occidental College and the Yale School of Drama. She was the first woman to win a Tony Award for set design, which she won for the musical Big River. She has also won the Drama Desk Award and Outer Critics Circle awards and an Obie Award.

== Career ==
She has designed the sets for many Broadway productions, starting with 'night, Mother in 1983, and including Big River (1985), The Secret Garden (1991), and Good Vibrations in 2005. Of her sets for The Adventures of Tom Sawyer, the CurtainUp reviewer wrote: "The best starting point for what's right and wrong with 'The Adventures of Tom Sawyer', the new musical based on Mark Twain's novel, are Heidi Ettinger's sets. Ettinger, who also worked on 'Big River', ... has given the town of St. Petersburg, Mo. the look of a colorful three-dimensional folk art painting or quilt."

She designed the sets for Triumph of Love in 1997, and The Sound of Music revival also in 1997. In an article in The New York Times, the writer observed, "If there is an Ettinger trademark linking all her designs, it's that there is no trademark. 'I never do the same thing twice,' she [Ettinger] said."

She has designed for many Off-Broadway productions, starting with The Vienna Notes by Richard Nelson at Playwrights Horizons in 1979 and more recently Uncommon Women and Others by Wendy Wasserstein at Second Stage Theatre in 1994.

She designed the scenery for the production of A Midsummer Night's Dream at the Delacorte Theater in Central Park in August 1982, with Mel Gussow in his review in The New York Times noting: "...the Delacorte Theater in Central Park has been turned into a sylvan glade, complete with rolling greensward, trees, blossoming flowers and a babbling pond. The scene is natural - not artificial -and, for that, credit should go to the scenic designer, Heidi Landesman..." She designed the set for the Second Stage Theatre production of Painting Churches in February 1983. The reviewer for The Christian Science Monitor wrote : "The production staged by Carole Rothman has been beautifully and observantly designed by Heidi Landesman (scenery)..." She won the Obie Award for her work on A Midsummer Night's Dream and Painting Churches.

She designed the set for the Off-Broadway one-man show Dinner With Demons at the Second Stage Theater in 2003, which was written and performed by her husband, Jonathan Reynolds. She was the "chief advocate" for this production. The CurtainUp reviewer noted: "Having won her case, she's created a set that is a star in its own right. The wide stage is flanked by two colorful cornucopias of fruits, vegetables and breads, with a floor to ceiling backdrop of spice jar filled glass shelves and overhanging the work area there's thousands of dollars worth of shiny copper utensils..." She designed the sets for King Lear in 2007 at the Public Theater, starring Kevin Kline. Ben Brantley, The New York Times reviewer wrote: "Ms. Ettinger’s tiered high-concept set combines industrial chic with a feeling of elemental magic."

She also worked in Berlin, designing a production of Hunchback of Notre Dame (1999).

In regional theater, she designed the sets for the musical Zhivago (later retitled Doctor Zhivago) which ran at the La Jolla Playhouse in 2006. She designed the sets for the stage musical A Room with a View, which ran at the Old Globe Theatre in 2012.

== Personal ==
She was married to Rocco Landesman, who she met at Yale; they divorced circa 1997. She married Jonathan Reynolds, a playwright, in 2004. Reynolds died in 2021.

== Awards and nominations ==
Tony Award

- 1985 - Scenic Design (Play or Musical) Big River Winner
- 1991 - Scenic Design (Play or Musical) The Secret Garden Winner
- 2001 - Scenic Design (Play or Musical) The Adventures of Tom Sawyer Nominated

Drama Desk Award

- 1985 - Outstanding Set Design Big River Winner
- 2001 - Outstanding Set Design of a Musical The Adventures of Tom Sawyer Nominated

Outer Critics Circle Award

- 1998 Outstanding Set Design The Sound of Music Nominated
- 2001 Outstanding Set Design The Adventures of Tom Sawyer Nominated

Obie Award

- 1983 Design A Midsummer Night's Dream and Painting Churches Winner
