= John Bury (theatre designer) =

British set, costume and lighting designer

John Bury OBE (27 January 1925 - 12 November 2000) was a British set, costume and lighting designer who worked for theatres in London, the rest of the UK, and Broadway and international opera.

Bury was educated at Hereford Cathedral School. After serving in the Royal Navy during World War II, he pursued a variety of jobs before joining the Theatre Workshop under the direction of Joan Littlewood at the Theatre Royal Stratford East in London. In 1963 he joined the Royal Shakespeare Company, whose artistic director was then Peter Hall. In 1973 he followed Hall to the National Theatre Company, then still based at the Old Vic, to become its Head of Design and an associate director.

For Hall's Broadway production of Amadeus by Peter Shaffer, transferred from the National Theatre, Bury was nominated for Tony Awards for scenery, costumes and lighting, and received the awards for scenery and lighting. He was also nominated for five more Tony Awards including his first production on Broadway, Harold Pinter's The Homecoming in 1967.

He was appointed OBE in the 1979 New Year Honours list.
