= List of musicals filmed live on stage =

The following is a list of works of musical theatre that have been notably filmed live on stage, also known as professionally shot musicals or, colloquially, proshot musicals. Musicals are listed by the year they were filmed, not necessarily by the year they were first broadcast or released to the public. Unless otherwise specified, these productions were performed in English.

== Before 1980 ==
=== 1938 ===
- Under Your Hat (live television recording, Palace Theatre, BBC)

=== 1939 ===
- The Desert Song (live television recording, Garrick Theatre, BBC)
- Magyar Melody (live television recording, His Majesty's Theatre, BBC)
- Me and My Girl (live television recording, Victoria Palace Theatre, BBC)

=== 1955 ===
- The Desert Song (live television recording; Max Liebman Presents)

=== 1957 ===
- Annie Get Your Gun (live television recording; NBC-TV)

=== 1976 ===
- Pacific Overtures (original Broadway cast)

=== 1978 ===
- The Comedy of Errors (ITV)

== 1980s ==
=== 1980 ===
- The Pirates of Penzance (The Public Theater, New York)
- Tell Me on a Sunday (BBC)
- Snow White and the Seven Dwarfs (musical) (Radio City Music Hall, HBO)

=== 1981 ===
- Ain't Misbehavin' (broadcast 1982)
- Pippin (CTV)

=== 1982 ===
- Camelot (2nd Broadway revival)
- Sophisticated Ladies (1986 release)
- Sweeney Todd: The Demon Barber of Fleet Street (national tour, Los Angeles; PBS Great Performances)

=== 1984 ===
- Barnum (with Michael Crawford; BBC release 1986; PBS Great Performances 1990)

=== 1985 ===
- The Gospel at Colonus
- Sunday in the Park with George (original Broadway cast; Showtime and PBS American Playhouse broadcasts 1986)

=== 1986 ===
- Follies in Concert

=== 1989 ===
- Show Boat (PBS Great Performances)
- Into the Woods (original Broadway cast; PBS American Playhouse broadcast 1991; public release 1997 and 2014)

== 1990s ==
=== 1990 ===
- A Little Night Music (New York City Opera revival; PBS Live from Lincoln Center)

=== 1991 ===
- The Will Rogers Follies

=== 1993 ===
- Bette Midler: Gypsy (made-for-television film)
- Cabaret (Dir. Sam Mendes)
- Nunsense (with Rue McClanahan)

=== 1994 ===
- Jesus Christ Superstar: A Resurrection
- Nunsense 2: The Sequel
- The Pirates of Penzance (Essgee Entertainment)

=== 1995 ===
- A Tale of Cinderella
- Les Misérables: The Dream Cast in Concert or 10th Anniversary Concert
- Victor/Victoria
- Company (Donmar Warehouse, London; BBC Two broadcast 1997)
- Passion (PBS American Playhouse broadcast 1996; Image Entertainment release 2003)
- The Wizard of Oz in Concert: Dreams Come True

=== 1997 ===
- H.M.S. Pinafore (Essgee Entertainment)

=== 1998 ===
- Cats (PolyGram)
- Nunsense 3: The Jamboree

=== 1999 ===
- Joseph and the Amazing Technicolor Dreamcoat (London; The Really Useful Group; PolyGram / PBS Great Performances broadcast 2000)

== 2000s ==
=== 2000 ===
- Jekyll & Hyde: Direct from Broadway (original Broadway run, final cast; Broadway Worldwide; broadcast 2001)
- Peter Pan (California; A&E)
- Smokey Joe's Cafe: Direct from Broadway (Broadway Worldwide)

=== 2001 ===
- Nuncrackers: The Nunsense Christmas Musical
- Putting It Together: Direct from Broadway (Broadway Worldwide)
- Sweeney Todd the Concert (Avery Fisher Hall, Broadway)

=== 2002 ===
- Fosse (PBS Great Performances)
- Kiss Me, Kate (London revival; PBS Great Performances broadcast 2003)
- Ragtime (BBC Four)
- Contact (PBS Live from Lincoln Center)

=== 2003 ===
- Taboo

=== 2004 ===
- Our House
- The Rat Pack: Live from Las Vegas

=== 2005 ===
- Acorn Antiques The Musical! (original London cast, 2006 release)
- Candide (PBS Live from Lincoln Center / Great Performances broadcast)
- Jerry Springer the Opera (London; BBC Two 2006 broadcast)
- Passion (PBS Live from Lincoln Center)

=== 2006 ===
- Company (Broadway revival with Raúl Esparza; PBS Great Performances broadcast 2008; DVD and Blu-Ray 2009 release)
- Jeff Wayne's Musical Version of the War of the Worlds (Universal Pictures)
- Kiss Me, Kate (London)
- The Light in the Piazza (Broadway run; PBS Live from Lincoln Center)
- Manchester Passion (UK)
- South Pacific in Concert (Carnegie Hall)
- The Ten Commandments: The Musical (Kodak Theatre, Hollywood)

=== 2007 ===
- Bad Girls: The Musical (2009 release)
- Never Forget (original tour, Manchester Opera House; Universal Pictures)
- Naked Boys Singing!
- Nunsensations: The Nunsense Vegas Revue
- Legally Blonde (Broadway; MTV)

=== 2008 ===
- Camelot (PBS Live from Lincoln Center)
- Imagine This
- Keating! (ABC2, Madman Entertainment)
- Rent: Filmed Live on Broadway (original Broadway run, final cast)
- Rocky Horror Tribute Show

=== 2009 ===
- Chess in Concert (PBS Great Performances)
- Passing Strange (original Broadway cast; Spike Lee / IFC; PBS Great Performances 2010 broadcast)
- The Nightman Cometh Live!
- A Very Potter Musical (original cast, though not professionally shot; StarKid Productions)
- 9 to 5: The Musical (Original Broadway cast, recorded April 11th 2009)

== 2010s ==
=== 2010 ===
- Into the Woods (Regent's Park Open Air Theatre, London revival; 2011 release)
- Les Misérables in Concert: The 25th Anniversary (Cinema release, followed by DVD/Blu-ray)
- Meshuggah-Nuns!
- South Pacific (PBS Live From Lincoln Center)

=== 2011 ===
- The Pee-Wee Herman Show on Broadway (Filmed January 2011, HBO release in March 2011)
- Company (New York Philharmonic revival with Neil Patrick Harris; DVD and Blu-Ray 2012 release)
- Memphis: Direct from Broadway
- Phantom of the Opera at the Royal Albert Hall(Cinema release, followed by Blu-ray/DVD Release)

=== 2012 ===
- Holy Musical B@man! (StarKid Productions)
- Jeff Wayne's Musical Version of The War of the Worlds – The New Generation (Universal Studios 2013 release)
- Jesus Christ Superstar (Arena Tour, UK; Universal Studios / The Really Useful Group)
- Love Never Dies (Regent Theatre, Melbourne)
- Nunset Boulevard

=== 2013 ===
- Carousel (PBS Live from Lincoln Center)
- Follies (Opéra de Toulon)
- Merrily We Roll Along (London; Digital Theatre)
- Shrek the Musical (original Broadway run; RadicalMedia / DreamWorks)
- Sunday in the Park With George (Mezzo TV)
- The Sound of Music Live! (NBC)

=== 2014 ===
- Ani (StarKid Productions)
- Billy Elliot the Musical Live
- From Here to Eternity
- Kiss Me, Kate (BBC Proms)
- Lady Day at Emerson's Bar and Grill (HBO broadcast 2016)
- Miss Saigon: 25th Anniversary
- Peter Pan Live! (NBC television event)
- Show Boat (PBS Live from Lincoln Center 2015 broadcast)
- Sweeney Todd in Concert (PBS Live from Lincoln Center)
- 21 Chump Street

=== 2015 ===
- Daddy Long Legs
- Gypsy: Live from the Savoy Theatre (London) (Originally broadcast on BBC Four, PBS's Great Performances before Blu-ray/DVD release in 2016)
- Show Boat (San Francisco Opera)
- The Rocky Horror Show Live (40th Anniversary broadcast, London)
- The Wiz Live! (NBC)
- The Sound of Music (ITV)

=== 2016 ===
- Allegiance (Broadway)
- Falsettos (PBS Great Performances broadcast 2017)
- Funny Girl (London revival and then Digital Theatre, Manchester, UK; 2018 release)
- Grease Live! (Fox television event)
- Hairspray Live! (NBC television event)
- Holiday Inn (BroadwayHD / Universal Pictures 2017 release)
- The Passion: New Orleans (Fox television event)
- She Loves Me (Broadway revival; The Roundabout Theatre Company / BroadwayHD)
- The Threepenny Opera
- The Woodsman
- Hamilton (Walt Disney Studios Motion Pictures)

=== 2017 ===
- A Christmas Story Live! (Fox television event)
- An American in Paris (London; PBS Great Performances broadcast 2018)
- Elf (Manchester, UK; Channel 5, UK)
- Follies (London revival)
- Lazarus (original New York broadcast 2018; global broadcast 2021)
- The MeshugaNutcracker! (Amazon; BroadwayHD)
- Newsies
- The Wind in the Willows (BroadwayHD)

=== 2018 ===
- Bandstand
- Eugenius! (Facebook Live 2020 broadcast)
- Everybody's Talking About Jamie
- The Guy Who Didn't Like Musicals (StarKid Productions)
- Jesus Christ Superstar Live in Concert (NBC television event)
- The King and I (London revival; Trafalgar Entertainment, 2019 release)
- The Toxic Avenger (BroadwayHD)

=== 2019 ===
- 42nd Street
- Aladdin (mixed production cast, London; Disney+ exclusive release; currently unreleased to the public)
- Curtains (Palace Theatre, Manchester 2020 release)
- Fame (Peacock Theatre, London; BroadwayHD 2020 release)
- Into the Woods: Live at the Hollywood Bowl
- Kinky Boots (original London run; Fathom Events / BroadwayHD)
- Les Misérables: The Staged Concert (Gielgud Theatre, London)
- The Little Mermaid Live!
- Rent: Live (Fox television event)
- Ruthless! (Arts Theatre, London; BroadwayHD)
- The SpongeBob Musical: Live On Stage! (Nickelodeon)

== 2020s ==
=== 2020 ===
- Dr. Seuss' The Grinch Musical Live! (NBC television event)
- Godspell: 50th Anniversary Concert (BroadwayHD)
- David Byrne’s American Utopia (HBO)

=== 2021 ===
- Anything Goes (BBC 2 2022 broadcast)
- Annie Live! (NBC television event)
- Come From Away (Entertainment One / RadicalMedia; Apple TV+ release)
- Diana (Netflix)
- Little Women (London premiere; Aria Entertainment / BroadwayHD)

=== 2022 ===
- Beauty and the Beast: A 30th Celebration
- Between the Lines (musical)
- Emojiland (Currently unreleased)
- Girl from the North Country (Broadway)
- Heathers: The Musical (London revival; Roku Original, 2023 DVD/Blu-ray Release)
- Jersey Boys (GK Films 2021 or 2022; currently unreleased)
- Mr. Saturday Night: A New Musical Comedy
- Trevor: The Musical (Disney+)

=== 2023 ===
- The Prince of Egypt (Universal Pictures; DVD and Blu-Ray 2024 release)
- Waitress: The Musical (Broadway return cast)
- Titanic: The Musical
- The Little Big Things

=== 2024 ===
- Bonnie & Clyde (London; Staged Concert)
- Frozen (London; Disney+ 2025 release)
- Kiss Me, Kate (London)
- Merrily We Roll Along (Broadway revival; December 2025 release)
- Next To Normal (London, Wyndham’s Theatre)
- Suffs (PBS release)
- Yellow Face (PBS release)
- Purlie Victorius: A Non-Confederate Romp Through the Cotton Patch (PBS Release 2024, YouTube Release 2026)

=== 2025 ===
- Bat Out of Hell (UK Tour 2025; theatrically released in the UK; Stagescreen, BroadwayHD)
- Six: The Musical Live! (Original London cast reunion 2022; released in UK theaters 2025, released in US theaters 2026)
- Giant (Filmed Summer 2025, cinematic release November 2026)

=== 2026 ===
- Hadestown (London, mixed production cast; theatrically released in July 2026)
- Starlight Express (Filmed January 2026, London. Due for theatrical release November)
- Phantom of the Opera (Filmed October 2026, London. Due for release 2027)

== Musicals performed in languages other than English ==
=== 1999 ===
- Notre-Dame de Paris (Paris)

=== 2015 ===
- The Count of Monte Cristo (St. Gallen, Switzerland)
- Death Note (Two Casts, Japan)

=== 2016 or 2017 ===
- Anna Karenina (Moscow Operetta Theatre; 2017 first US release)

=== 2018 ===
- Romeo e Giulietta - Ama e cambia il mondo (Italy)

=== 2021 ===
- Midnight Sun (South Korea)
- Mōryō no Hako
- Mozart! (Two Casts, Japan)
- Next To Normal (China)

=== 2023 ===
- La Legende du Roi Arthur (Two Casts, Japan)
- A Silent Voice
- Spy x Family

=== 2024 ===
- In This Corner of the World
- RRR (Takarazuka Revue)
- Tesso no Ori

== See also ==
- List of musical films by year
