= Derrick Baskin =

American actor (born 1975)

- Baskin in 2026
- Born: Derrick B. Baskin; November 10, 1975 (age 50); Bronx, New York
- Education: Hampton University
- Occupations: Actor; singer
- Years active: 2005–present
- Known for: The Little Mermaid and Memphis
- Parent(s): Douglas Baskin and Carol Baskin

Derrick Baskin (born November 10, 1975) is an actor best known for his Grammy and Tony Award-nominated performance in the Tony Award-nominated Broadway musical Ain't Too Proud, based on the life and times of the musical singing group, The Temptations.

He originated the role of "Comfort Counselor" Mitch Mahoney in the popular Broadway show The 25th Annual Putnam County Spelling Bee, his first major role. Baskin also originated the role of "Jetsam" in the Broadway version of The Little Mermaid. He originated the role of "Gator" in Memphis and also appeared in the filmed version of the musical, Memphis: Direct from Broadway by Broadway Worldwide.

Baskin has a BA in Biology from Hampton University.

== Theatre credits ==
Year	Production	Role	Venue	Notes
2005	The 25th Annual Putnam County Spelling Bee	Mitch Mahoney; Dance captain	Second Stage Theater	Off-Broadway
2005–2007	The 25th Annual Putnam County Spelling Bee	Mitch Mahoney; Dance captain	Circle in the Square Theatre	Broadway
2007	The Little Mermaid	Jetsam Sebastian (u/s)	Denver Center for the Performing Arts	Regional
2007-09	The Little Mermaid	Jetsam Sebastian (u/s)	Lunt-Fontanne Theatre	Broadway
2009–2012	Memphis	Gator	Shubert Theatre	Broadway
2014	Piece of My Heart: The Bert Berns Story	Hoagy	Pershing Square Signature Center	Off-Broadway
2015	Whorl Inside a Loop	Sunnyside	Second Stage Theater	Off-Broadway
2017	Ain't Too Proud	Otis Williams	Berkeley Repertory Theatre	Regional
2018	Ain't Too Proud	Otis Williams	John F. Kennedy Center for the Performing Arts	Regional
2018	Ain't Too Proud	Otis Williams	Ahmanson Theatre	Regional
2018	Ain't Too Proud	Otis Williams	Princess of Wales Theatre	Toronto
2019–2020	Ain't Too Proud	Otis Williams	Imperial Theatre	Broadway

== Filmography ==
=== Film ===
Year	Title	Role	Notes
2011	Memphis: Direct from Broadway	Gator	
2014	Annie	Auditioning father	
2015	Anesthesia	Medical examiner	
2017	Marshall	Ted Lancaster	

=== Television ===
Year	Title	Role	Notes
2011	Law & Order: Special Victims Unit	Uni	Episode: "Personal Fouls"
2012	Great Performances	Gator	Episode: Memphis
2012	Law & Order: Special Victims Unit	Cash Gilette	Episode: "Acceptable Loss"
2015	Law & Order: Special Victims Unit	Cash Gilette	Episode: "Undercover Mother"
2015–2017	Difficult People	Nate	Recurring role (18 episode)

=== Web ===
Year	Title	Role	Notes
2011	Submissions Only	Julius White	Episode: "Mean Like Me"

== Awards and nominations ==
Year	Awards	Category	Work	Result	Ref.
2005	Drama Desk Awards	Outstanding Ensemble Performance	The 25th Annual Putnam County Spelling Bee	Won	
2014	Viv awards	Outstanding Performance in a Musical/Male	Piece of My Heart: The Bert Berns Story	Won	
2019	Tony Awards	Best Performance by a Leading Actor in a Musical	Ain't Too Proud	Nominated	
2020	Grammy Awards	Best Musical Theater Album	Ain't Too Proud	Nominated	
