= Memphis: Direct from Broadway =

- Advertisement poster
- Directed by: Don Roy King
- Based on: Memphis by Joe DiPietro
- Starring: Chad Kimball; Montego Glover; J. Bernard Calloway; Cass Morgan; Derrick Baskin; James Monroe Iglehart; Michael McGrath
- Music by: David Bryan
- Distributed by: Broadway worldwide NCM Fathom; The Fremantle Corporation (non-USA)
- Release date: April 28, 2011
- Running time: 165 minutes
- Country: United States
- Language: English

Memphis: Direct from Broadway is a 2011 film of the original Broadway production of the musical Memphis as captured live in performance on Broadway. The show was captured at Broadway's Shubert Theatre in New York City January 18–21, 2011, utilizing multiple high-definition cameras and 96 tracks of sound recording. The film had a limited theatrical release between April 28-May 3, 2011, in more than 530 theaters with high-definition digital projection systems in the US and Canada. This marked the first time the Tony Award-winning Best Musical was presented in movie theaters while concurrently running on Broadway.

Shout! Factory announced that it had partnered with Broadway Worldwide to bring the 131-minute film to home audiences. Memphis debuted for streaming on Netflix in July 2011. The film was released nationwide on Blu-ray, DVD and digital download on January 24, 2012. Prior to its January 2012 in-store release, the DVD and Blu-ray edition became available October 14, 2011, at the Broadway home of Memphis, the Shubert Theatre, as well as venues presenting the national tour of the musical, which launched the same day at the Orpheum Theatre in Memphis, Tennessee. NCM Fathom distributed the movie in US locations, while Fremantle Media has the rights for international distribution.

The film is assembled from footage shot at five regularly scheduled performances January 18–21, 2011, at the Shubert Theatre. The film includes a 20-minute behind-the-scenes look at how the show was captured for the big screen, followed directly into the feature presentation of the complete Broadway musical.

== Cast ==
- Chad Kimball as Huey
- Montego Glover as Felicia
- J. Bernard Calloway as Delray
- Derrick Baskin as Gator
- James Monroe Iglehart as Bobby
- Michael McGrath as Mr. Simmons
- Cass Morgan as Mama
- Jennifer Allen as Clara/White Mother/Ensemble
- Brad Bass as Perry Como/Frank Dryer/Ensemble
- Tracee Beazer as 'Someday' Backup Singer/Ensemble
- Tanya Birl as Ethel/Ensemble
- Kevin Covert as Buck Wiley/Martin Holton/Ensemble
- Preston W. Dugger III as Be Black Trio/Ensemble
- Hillary Elk as Teenager/Ensemble
- Bryan Fenkhart as Ensemble
- Dionne Figgins as 'Someday' Backup Singer/Double Dutch Girl/Ensemble
- Bahiyah Sayyed Gaines as Ensemble
- Rhett George as Black DJ/Be Black Trio/Ensemble
- Todrick Hall as Ensemble
- Robert Hartwell as Wailin' Joe/Reverend Hobson/Ensemble
- John Jellison as White DJ/Mr. Collins/Gordon Grant/White Father/Ensemble
- Brian Langlitz as Ensemble
- Kyle Leland as Be Black Trio/Ensemble
- Paul McGill as Ensemble
- Andy Mills as Ensemble
- Betsy Struxness as Double Dutch Girl/Ensemble
- Dan'yelle Williamson as 'Someday' Backup Singer/Ensemble
