= Piece of My Heart: The Bert Berns Story =

- 2014 Off-Broadway Playbill
- Music: Bert Berns
- Lyrics: Bert Berns
- Book: Daniel Goldfarb
- Productions: 2011 New York Stage and Film; 2014 Pershing Square Signature Center

Piece of My Heart: The Bert Berns Story is a jukebox musical with a book by Daniel Goldfarb and music and lyrics by Bert Berns. Based on the life and music of songwriter and record producer Bert Berns, the musical made its world premiere Off Broadway at the Pershing Square Signature Center on July 21, 2014.

== Background ==
Bert Berns is a vastly influential figure in the history of American music, yet his extraordinary impact went widely unknown. Rolling Stone called Berns "one of the great untold stories of rock and roll." He is responsible for some of the most enduring classics of sixties pop and R&B, and has been credited with bringing Latin rhythms into rock and roll and the creation of New York Uptown Soul. Berns died in 1967 at the young age of 38 due to a rheumatic heart condition, and his children Brett Berns and Cassandra Berns conceived of the musical as part of a concerted effort to champion his legacy. With his autobiographical body of work and dramatic life story, the musical's creators used Berns' canon to tell his story through his own songs.

Piece of My Heart follows the story of Berns' rise in the music business, and his daughter's search for the father she never knew. Berns died from heart failure when his daughter was an infant, and she comes to know him through his music over the course of the play.

Music and lyrics were written by Bert Berns, either alone or with a variety of co-writers. The songs range from Berns' greatest hits ("Twist and Shout", "Piece of My Heart," "Tell Him," "Hang On Sloopy", "Cry Baby," "I Want Candy", "Cry To Me," "Here Comes the Night," "Everybody Needs Somebody to Love") to some of his more obscure work ("Show Me Your Monkey," "Let the Water Run Down," "Heart Be Still").

== Productions ==
=== Off-Broadway ===
Piece of My Heart debuted Off-Broadway at the Irene Diamond Stage at The Pershing Square Signature Center during the summer of 2014. The production received a positive review from The New York Times and the limited run was extended by popular demand. Directed and choreographed by Denis Jones, it starred Zak Resnick as Bert Berns alongside Broadway veterans Linda Hart, De'Adre Aziza, Leslie Kritzer, Joseph Siravo and Derrick Baskin. Bert Berns' longtime arranger / conductor Garry Sherman came out of retirement to do the musical's arrangements and orchestrations; Lon Hoyt prepared additional arrangements and was the show's music director. The design team included scenic design by Alexander Dodge, costume design by David Woolard, lighting design by Ben Stanton and sound design by Carl Casella. Piece of My Heart played its last performance Off-Broadway on September 14, 2014. Producers announced plans to transfer the show to Broadway in the 2015-16 Season, although this ultimately fell through.

=== Pre Off-Broadway ===
Early development began at New York Theatre Workshop in the East Village of Manhattan in 2008, where a number of readings took place over the next two years. The musical received a month-long workshop production at New York Stage and Film's Powerhouse Season at Vassar College during the summer of 2011. The New York Stage and Film production was directed by Leigh Silverman and choreographed by Denis Jones and starred Jarrod Spector as Bert, Jenn Colella as Jessie, Linda Hart as Ilene, and De'Adre Aziza as Candace.

== Cast ==
Role	Original Off-Broadway Cast
Bert Berns	Zak Resnick
Jessie	Leslie Kritzer
Ilene	Linda Hart
Wazzel	Joseph Siravo
Candace	De'Adre Aziza
Hoagy	Derrick Baskin
Young Wazzel	Bryan Fenkart
Young Ilene	Teal Wicks
Jerry	Mark Zeisler
Carlos / Ensemble	Sydney James Harcourt
Notable ensemble members	Heather Parcells and Gabrielle Ruiz and Ralph Meitzler

== Critical response ==
Laura Collins-Hughes, in her review for The New York Times, wrote: "Filling that gap in our rock 'n' roll awareness is the mission behind the gorgeously tuneful, new jukebox musical "Piece of My Heart: The Bert Berns Story - and if your first response to that title is "Bert who?," well, that's exactly the point...When Bert Berns died at 38 in 1967, he left a voluminous catalog, and "Piece of My Heart" taps it expertly. "Twist and Shout", "I Want Candy," "Hang On Sloopy" and "Everybody Needs Somebody to Love" are among the many familiar songs that the show's stellar singers and splendid eight-piece orchestra may lodge in your brain.

Jeremy Gerard of Deadline Hollywood wrote: "Jukebox musicals are the guilty pleasures of Broadway, and ever more frequently, off-Broadway, offering well-heeled patrons the joys of nostalgia and the reassuring sense that the songs we grew up on were classics worthy of revisiting. How else to account for the extraordinary popularity of Jersey Boys, Beautiful: The Carole King Musical, Motown: The Musical, The Million Dollar Quartet, Smokey Joe's Cafe, Mamma Mia! and Rock of Ages? Piece of My Heart: The Bert Berns Story, which opened Sunday night on 42nd Street, is a bargain-basement jukebox musical as entertaining as the best of those shows... So: Bert Who?...That's the point of Piece of My Heart, the irresistible show with a weird but effective book by Daniel Goldfarb, songs by Berns performed by a cast that goes into overdrive to win our sympathy (they succeed) and a production directed and choreographed by Denis Jones that manages to embrace every cliche of the jukebox genre, and still hold us rapt."
