= 62nd Tony Awards =

2008 US theatrical awards ceremony

- Date: June 15, 2008
- Location: Radio City Music Hall, New York City, NY
- Hosted by: Whoopi Goldberg

Highlights
- Most wins: South Pacific (7)
- Most nominations: In the Heights (13)
- Website: tonyawards.com

Television/radio coverage
- Network: CBS
- Viewership: 6.2 million
- Produced by: Ricky Kirshner; Glenn Weiss
- Directed by: Glenn Weiss

The 62nd Tony Awards ceremony was held on June 15, 2008. The Antoinette Perry Awards for Excellence in Theatre, more commonly known as the Tony Awards, recognize achievement in live American theatre. CBS television broadcast the event from Radio City Music Hall in New York City as it has since the 51st Awards ceremony in 1997. The event recognized Broadway productions playing during the 2007 – 2008 season and was hosted by Whoopi Goldberg.

The cut-off date for eligibility in the 2007–08 season was May 7, 2008. The Tony Awards Administration Committee announced eligibility rules for many of the award categories. Two new categories debuted at this ceremony: Best Sound Design of a Musical and Best Sound Design of a Play.

The Tony Award nominations were announced on May 13, 2008 by David Hyde Pierce and Sara Ramirez. In the Heights, which premiered Off-Broadway, garnered the most nominations of any show with 13. Rodgers & Hammerstein's South Pacific received 11, the second most of any revival to date (one of these was in the new "sound design" category). The Pulitzer Prize-winning drama August: Osage County earned seven nominations. The revival of Sunday in the Park with George received nine nominations, the revival of Gypsy received seven, as did the new musical Passing Strange.

The "Visa Signature Tonys Preview Concert" was taped at Jazz at Lincoln Center on May 11, 2008 and broadcast on CBS television affiliates in June. The concert featured performances from 10 Tony-eligible musicals as well as interviews with Tony nominees. This television show received a nomination for a New York Emmy Award in the Best Special Event Coverage category; the Awards were presented on March 29, 2009.

== Eligibility ==
Shows that opened on Broadway during the 2007–08 season before May 8, 2008 are eligible.

Original plays

- August: Osage County
- A Bronx Tale
- The Farnsworth Invention
- Is He Dead?
- Mauritius
- November
- Rock 'n' Roll
- The Seafarer
- The 39 Steps
- Thurgood

Original musicals

- A Catered Affair
- Cry-Baby
- Glory Days
- In the Heights
- The Little Mermaid
- Passing Strange
- Xanadu
- Young Frankenstein

Play revivals

- Boeing-Boeing
- Cat on a Hot Tin Roof
- Come Back, Little Sheba
- The Country Girl
- Cymbeline
- Cyrano de Bergerac
- The Homecoming
- Les Liaisons Dangereuses
- Macbeth
- Old Acquaintance
- Pygmalion
- The Ritz
- Top Girls

Musical revivals

- Dr. Seuss' How the Grinch Stole Christmas! The Musical
- Grease
- Gypsy
- South Pacific
- Sunday in the Park with George

== Awards ceremony ==
=== Presenters ===
The initial list of presenters was announced on June 2, 2008. Additional presenters were announced on June 5.

- Alec Baldwin
- Gabriel Byrne
- Julie Chen
- Kristin Chenoweth
- Glenn Close
- Harry Connick, Jr.
- Laurence Fishburne
- Whoopi Goldberg
- Richard Griffiths
- Laura Linney
- John Lithgow
- Liza Minnelli
- Mary-Louise Parker
- Mandy Patinkin
- David Hyde Pierce
- Daniel Radcliffe
- Brooke Shields
- Marisa Tomei
- Lily Tomlin
- John Waters
- Adam Duritz

=== Performances ===
The cast of The Lion King opened the show with a performance "Circle of Life", celebrating the show's 10th anniversary. The cast of Grease, featuring Max Crumm and Laura Osnes as Danny and Sandy, then performed "Grease" and "We Go Together".

Patti LuPone performed "Everything's Coming Up Roses" with Boyd Gaines and Laura Benanti from Gypsy. This was followed by the cast of South Pacific in a medley of "There Is Nothin' Like A Dame", "Some Enchanted Evening", and "(I'm in Love with) a Wonderful Guy". Daniel Evans and Jenna Russell sang "Move On" from Sunday in the Park with George.

The cast of Cry-Baby next performed "A Little Upset". Stew and the cast of Passing Strange, including Daniel Breaker and De'Adre Aziza, performed "Keys (Marianna)"/"Keys (It's Alright)". Lin-Manuel Miranda and the cast of In the Heights followed this with "In the Heights"/"96,000", after which the cast of Xanadu performed "Don't Walk Away".

The three new musicals that were not nominated for Best Musical also gave abbreviated performances of a song from each show. Sierra Boggess performed "Part of Your World" from The Little Mermaid. Faith Prince performed "Vision" from A Catered Affair, as Leslie Kritzer and Matt Cavenaugh danced in the background, and Megan Mullally and Shuler Hensley performed "Deep Love" from Young Frankenstein.

The cast of Rent performed part of "La Vie Boheme", introduced by original cast member Anthony Rapp. Rapp then invited the rest of the original cast on stage, and they performed part of "Seasons of Love". All of the original cast members were there except for Kristen Lee Kelly and Jesse L. Martin.

== Winners and nominees ==
(winners are in bold)

Best Play	Best Musical
**August: Osage County – Tracy Letts**; Rock 'n' Roll – Tom Stoppard; The Seafarer – Conor McPherson; The 39 Steps – Patrick Barlow	**In the Heights**; Cry-Baby; Passing Strange; Xanadu
Best Revival of a Play	Best Revival of a Musical
**Boeing-Boeing**; The Homecoming; Les Liaisons Dangereuses; Macbeth	**South Pacific**; Grease; Gypsy; Sunday in the Park with George
Best Performance by a Leading Actor in a Play	Best Performance by a Leading Actress in a Play
**Mark Rylance – Boeing-Boeing as Robert**; Ben Daniels – Les Liaisons Dangereuses as Le Vicomte de Valmont; Laurence Fishburne – Thurgood as Thurgood Marshall; Rufus Sewell – Rock 'n' Roll as Jan; Patrick Stewart – Macbeth as Macbeth	**Deanna Dunagan – August: Osage County as Violet Weston**; Amy Morton – August: Osage County as Barbara Fordham; Eve Best – The Homecoming as Ruth; Kate Fleetwood – Macbeth as Lady Macbeth; S. Epatha Merkerson – Come Back, Little Sheba as Lola Delaney
Best Performance by a Leading Actor in a Musical	Best Performance by a Leading Actress in a Musical
**Paulo Szot – South Pacific as Emile de Becque**; Daniel Evans – Sunday in the Park with George as George; Lin-Manuel Miranda – In the Heights as Usnavi; Stew – Passing Strange as Narrator; Tom Wopat – A Catered Affair as Tom Hurley	**Patti LuPone – Gypsy as Mama Rose**; Kerry Butler – Xanadu as Kira/Clio; Kelli O'Hara – South Pacific as Ensign Nellie Forbush; Faith Prince – A Catered Affair as Agnes 'Aggie' Hurley; Jenna Russell – Sunday in the Park with George as Dot/Marie
Best Performance by a Featured Actor in a Play	Best Performance by a Featured Actress in a Play
**Jim Norton – The Seafarer as Richard Harkin**; Conleth Hill – The Seafarer as Ivan Curry; Bobby Cannavale – Mauritius as Dennis; Raúl Esparza – The Homecoming as Lenny; David Pittu – Is He Dead? as Various Characters	**Rondi Reed – August: Osage County as Mattie Fae Aiken**; Sinéad Cusack – Rock 'n' Roll as Eleanor/Esme; Mary McCormack – Boeing-Boeing as Gretchen; Laurie Metcalf – November as Clarice Bernstein; Martha Plimpton – Top Girls as Pope Joan/Angie
Best Performance by a Featured Actor in a Musical	Best Performance by a Featured Actress in a Musical
**Boyd Gaines – Gypsy as Herbie**; Daniel Breaker – Passing Strange as Youth; Danny Burstein – South Pacific as Luther Billis; Robin de Jesús – In the Heights as Sonny; Christopher Fitzgerald – Young Frankenstein as Igor	**Laura Benanti – Gypsy as Louise**; de'Adre Aziza – Passing Strange as Edwina/Marianna/Sudabey; Andrea Martin – Young Frankenstein as Frau Blücher; Olga Merediz – In the Heights as Abuela Claudia; Loretta Ables Sayre – South Pacific as Bloody Mary
Best Book of a Musical	Best Original Score (Music and/or Lyrics) Written for the Theatre
**Stew – Passing Strange**; Mark O'Donnell and Thomas Meehan – Cry-Baby; Quiara Alegría Hudes – In the Heights; Douglas Carter Beane – Xanadu	**In the Heights – Lin-Manuel Miranda (music and lyrics)**; Cry-Baby – David Javerbaum and Adam Schlesinger (music and lyrics); The Little Mermaid – Alan Menken (music) and Howard Ashman and Glenn Slater (lyrics); Passing Strange – Stew (music and lyrics) and Heidi Rodewald (lyrics)
Best Scenic Design of a Play	Best Scenic Design of a Musical
**Todd Rosenthal – August: Osage County**; Peter McKintosh – The 39 Steps; Scott Pask – Les Liaisons Dangereuses; Anthony Ward – Macbeth	**Michael Yeargan – South Pacific**; David Farley, Timothy Bird and The Knifedge Creative Network – Sunday in the Park with George; Anna Louizos – In the Heights; Robin Wagner – Young Frankenstein
Best Costume Design of a Play	Best Costume Design of a Musical
**Katrina Lindsay – Les Liaisons Dangereuses**; Gregory Gale – Cyrano de Bergerac; Rob Howell – Boeing-Boeing; Peter McKintosh – The 39 Steps	**Catherine Zuber – South Pacific**; David Farley – Sunday in the Park with George; Martin Pakledinaz – Gypsy; Paul Tazewell – In the Heights
Best Lighting Design of a Play	Best Lighting Design of a Musical
**Kevin Adams – The 39 Steps**; Howard Harrison – Macbeth; Donald Holder – Les Liaisons Dangereuses; Ann G. Wrightson – August: Osage County	**Donald Holder – South Pacific**; Ken Billington – Sunday in the Park with George; Howell Binkley – In the Heights; Natasha Katz – The Little Mermaid
Best Sound Design of a Play	Best Sound Design of a Musical
**Mic Pool – The 39 Steps**; Simon Baker – Boeing-Boeing; Adam Cork – Macbeth; Ian Dickson – Rock 'n' Roll	**Scott Lehrer – South Pacific**; Acme Sound Partners – In the Heights; Sebastian Frost – Sunday in the Park with George; Dan Moses Schreier – Gypsy
Best Direction of a Play	Best Direction of a Musical
**Anna D. Shapiro – August: Osage County**; Maria Aitken – The 39 Steps; Conor McPherson – The Seafarer; Matthew Warchus – Boeing-Boeing	**Bartlett Sher – South Pacific**; Sam Buntrock – Sunday in the Park with George; Thomas Kail – In the Heights; Arthur Laurents – Gypsy
Best Choreography	Best Orchestrations
**Andy Blankenbuehler – In the Heights**; Rob Ashford – Cry-Baby; Christopher Gattelli – South Pacific; Dan Knechtges – Xanadu	**Alex Lacamoire and Bill Sherman – In the Heights**; Jason Carr – Sunday in the Park with George; Stew and Heidi Rodewald – Passing Strange; Jonathan Tunick – A Catered Affair

== Special Tony Awards ==
Regional Theatre Tony Award

- Chicago Shakespeare Theater

Special Tony Award

- Robert Russell Bennett, for achievements in orchestration

Lifetime Achievement in the Theatre

- Stephen Sondheim

== Multiple nominations and awards ==
These productions had multiple nominations:

- 13 nominations: In the Heights
- 11 nominations: South Pacific
- 9 nominations: Sunday in the Park with George
- 7 nominations: August: Osage County, Gypsy & Passing Strange
- 6 nominations: Boeing-Boeing, Macbeth & The 39 Steps
- 5 nominations: Les Liaisons Dangereuses
- 4 nominations: Cry-Baby, Rock 'n' Roll, The Seafarer & Xanadu
- 3 nominations: A Catered Affair, The Homecoming & Young Frankenstein
- 2 nominations: The Little Mermaid

The following productions received multiple awards.

- 7 wins: South Pacific
- 5 wins: August: Osage County
- 4 wins: In the Heights
- 3 wins: Gypsy
- 2 wins: Boeing-Boeing & The 39 Steps

== See also ==
- Drama Desk Awards
- 2008 Laurence Olivier Awards – equivalent awards for West End theatre productions
- Obie Award
- New York Drama Critics' Circle
- Theatre World Award
- Lucille Lortel Awards
