= Montego Glover =

American actress

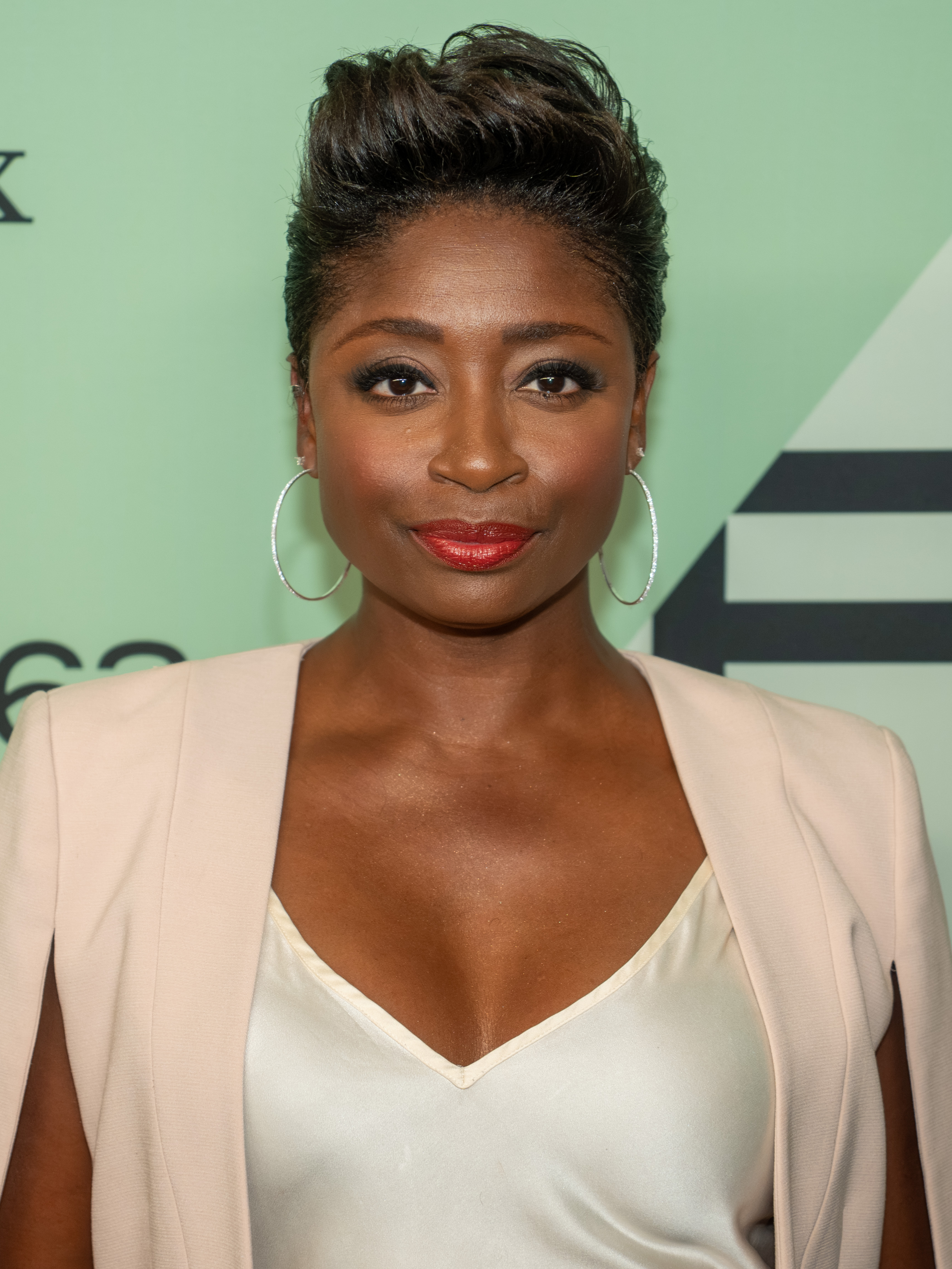
- Glover in 2025
- Born: February 9, 1974 (age 52); Macon, Georgia, USA
- Occupations: Actress, singer
- Years active: 2001–present

Montego Glover (born February 9, 1974) is an American stage actress and singer. She has been nominated for the Tony Award for Best Actress in a Musical for her role in the musical Memphis and won the Drama Desk Award for Outstanding Actress in a Musical.

On 1 September 2015, Glover starting playing Fantine in the second Broadway revival of Les Misérables, she left the production on 3 February 2016.

From 9 September 2017 to 31 March 31, 2019, Glover portrayed Angelica Schuyler in the Chicago cast of the Broadway blockbuster Hamilton.

On 6 September 6, 2022, she started sharing the role of the Witch with Patina Miller in the 2022 Broadway revival of Into the Woods. She left the production on 15 December 2022 being replaced by Joaquina Kalukango. She reprised her role in the 2023 national tour. Glover starred as Rose in Gypsy on Broadway from June to August 2025 alternating with Audra McDonald.

== Life and career ==
Glover was born in Macon, Georgia and raised in Chattanooga, Tennessee. She attended the Chattanooga School for the Arts & Sciences and then attended Florida State University, Tallahassee, Florida, where she graduated with a Bachelor of Fine Arts in Music Theatre with Honors. Glover sang in church choirs "for as long as I can remember".

She originated the role of Felicia in the musical Memphis. Glover received a nomination for the Tony Award for Best Performance by a Leading Actress in a Musical for her performance. Additionally, she won the Drama Desk Award for Outstanding Actress in a Musical (in a tie with Catherine Zeta-Jones). She displays a "rich, rangy and emotionally powerful voice in several standout numbers" according to Playbill. Montego has been with Memphis since it started, including four regional productions and appears in the live filming of the musical, Memphis: Direct from Broadway.

Her Broadway debut was as an understudy for Celie and Nettie in the musical The Color Purple.

In other work, she has been a "Star Wars videogame avatar and a TV commercial voice-over artist." She worked at Walt Disney World in Orlando, Florida in the late 1990s. Her voice is featured on the Festival of the Lion King official soundtrack.

She also guest starred on the USA Network show, White Collar in the episode "Judgement Day".

== Theatre (select) ==
Year	Show	Role	Notes
2001	Dreamgirls	Les Style	Broadway Concert
2002	Footloose	Rusty	North Shore Music Theatre
2002	Jesus Christ Superstar	Mary Magdalene	Cherry County Playhouse
2002	Annie	Ensemble	Paper Mill Playhouse
2003	Godspell	Bless the Lord	The Muny
2004	Dreamgirls	Lorrell Robinson	Benedum Center
2004	Ragtime	Sarah	North Carolina Theatre
2004	Aida	Aida	North Shore Music Theatre
2005	Once on This Island	Ti Moune	Round House Theatre
2005	Aida	Aida	Music Theatre Wichita
2006-2007	The Color Purple	u/s Celie, Nettie	Broadway
2008	The Color Purple	u/s Celie, Nettie	Broadway
2008	Little Shop of Horrors	Audrey	Paper Mill Playhouse
2009	Guys and Dolls	Sarah Brown	Wells Fargo Pavilion
2009-2012	Memphis	Felicia	Broadway
2013	The Pirates of Penzance	Kate	Off-Broadway
2013	She Loves Me	Ilona Ritter	Caramoor Center for Music and the Arts
2014	The Royale	Nina	Old Globe Theatre
2015	It Shoulda Been You	Annie Shepard	Broadway
2015	The Pirates of Penzance	Kate	Encores!
2015-2016	Les Misérables	Fantine	Broadway
2016	The Royale	Nina	Off-Broadway
2017-2019	Hamilton	Angelica Schuyler	CIBC Theatre
2019	Lady in the Dark	Maggie Grant	New York City Center
2022	Into the Woods	The Witch	Broadway
2023	Into the Woods	The Witch	US Tour
2025	Gypsy	Rose Hovick	Broadway
2026	An American Daughter	Judith Kaufman	Pershing Square Signature Center
2026	Here There Are Blueberries	Melita Maschmann & Others	Ethel Barrymore Theatre, Broadway

- Memphis: Direct from Broadway - Film, April 28, 2011
- Made in Jersey - TV Show, Aired December 1, 2012
