= Chad Kimball =

American theater actor (born 1976)

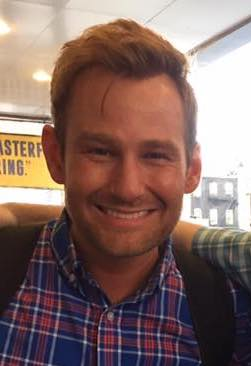
- Kimball in 2017
- Born: September 2, 1976 (age 49); Seattle, Washington, U.S.
- Education: Boston Conservatory at Berklee
- Occupation: Actor
- Years active: 1999–present
- Spouse: Emily Swallow (m. 2018)
- Website: www.chadkimball.com

Chad Kimball (born September 2, 1976) is an American stage actor known for roles in musical theatre, especially Huey Calhoun in the Broadway musical Memphis and Milky White in the 2002 Broadway revival of Into the Woods.

== Early life and career ==
Kimball was born in Seattle, Washington, on September 2, 1976, and graduated from Boston Conservatory with a BFA in musical theatre in 1999.

After moving to New York City, he performed in Broadway musicals and also appeared in regional theatre as Anthony in Sweeney Todd at the Signature Theatre (1999), Baby at the Paper Mill Playhouse, Millburn, New Jersey (2004), and Little Fish in 2007 at the Blank Theatre, Los Angeles.

== Memphis and later years ==
Kimball originated the lead role of Huey Calhoun in the musical Memphis at the La Jolla Playhouse in 2008, and starred in the role in the Broadway production until fall 2011 and was nominated for a Tony Award for Best Actor in a Musical for the role. Kimball appears in the filmed version, Memphis: Direct from Broadway by Broadway Worldwide.

In 2017 he returned to Broadway as Kevin T. in the musical Come from Away.

In March 2020, he contracted and recovered from COVID-19. Later that year, on Twitter, he criticized, and pledged to disobey, COVID public health restrictions regarding singing in churches. His tweet caused backlash. He was not invited to return to Come from Away when the show resumed production in 2021, and he subsequently filed a lawsuit against the show's producers, alleging religious discrimination.
