= Ain't Too Proud =

2018 jukebox musical

- The Life and Times of The Temptations
- Original Broadway Playbill
- Music: The Legendary Motown Catalog
- Book: Dominique Morisseau
- Basis: "The Temptations" by Otis Williams
- Premiere: August 31, 2017: Berkeley, CA
- Productions: 2019 Broadway; 2021 U.S. Tour; 2023 West End; 2024 U.S. 2nd National Tour

Ain't Too Proud: The Life and Times of The Temptations is a 2017 jukebox musical with music and lyrics by The Temptations and a book by Dominique Morisseau. Based on the story of The Temptations, the musical had a series of regional productions and opened at Broadway's Imperial Theatre in March 2019.

== Productions ==
=== Berkeley Rep (2017) ===
The musical premiered at the Berkeley Repertory Theatre in Berkeley, California, on August 31, 2017, with a press opening on September 14, for a limited engagement until November 5, 2017. The production was directed by Des McAnuff and choreographed by Sergio Trujillo. The production's design team included scenery by Robert Brill, costumes by Paul Tazewell, lighting by Howell Binkley, sound by Steve Canyon Kennedy, and projections by Peter Nigrini. The musical was originally set to play through October 8; but was later extended through October 22; and ultimately through November 5. The musical was the highest-grossing production in the theatre's history.

=== Washington, DC (2018) ===
Following its run at Berkeley Rep, the show moved to the Kennedy Center in Washington, DC where it ran from June 19, 2018, through July 22, 2018.

=== Los Angeles (2018) ===
Following its run at the Kennedy Center, the show moved to the Ahmanson Theatre in Los Angeles, California where it ran from August 21, 2018, through September 30, 2018.

=== Toronto (2018) ===
Following its run at the Ahmanson, the show moved to the Princess of Wales Theatre in Toronto, Ontario where it ran from October 11, 2018, through November 17, 2018.

=== Broadway (2019) ===
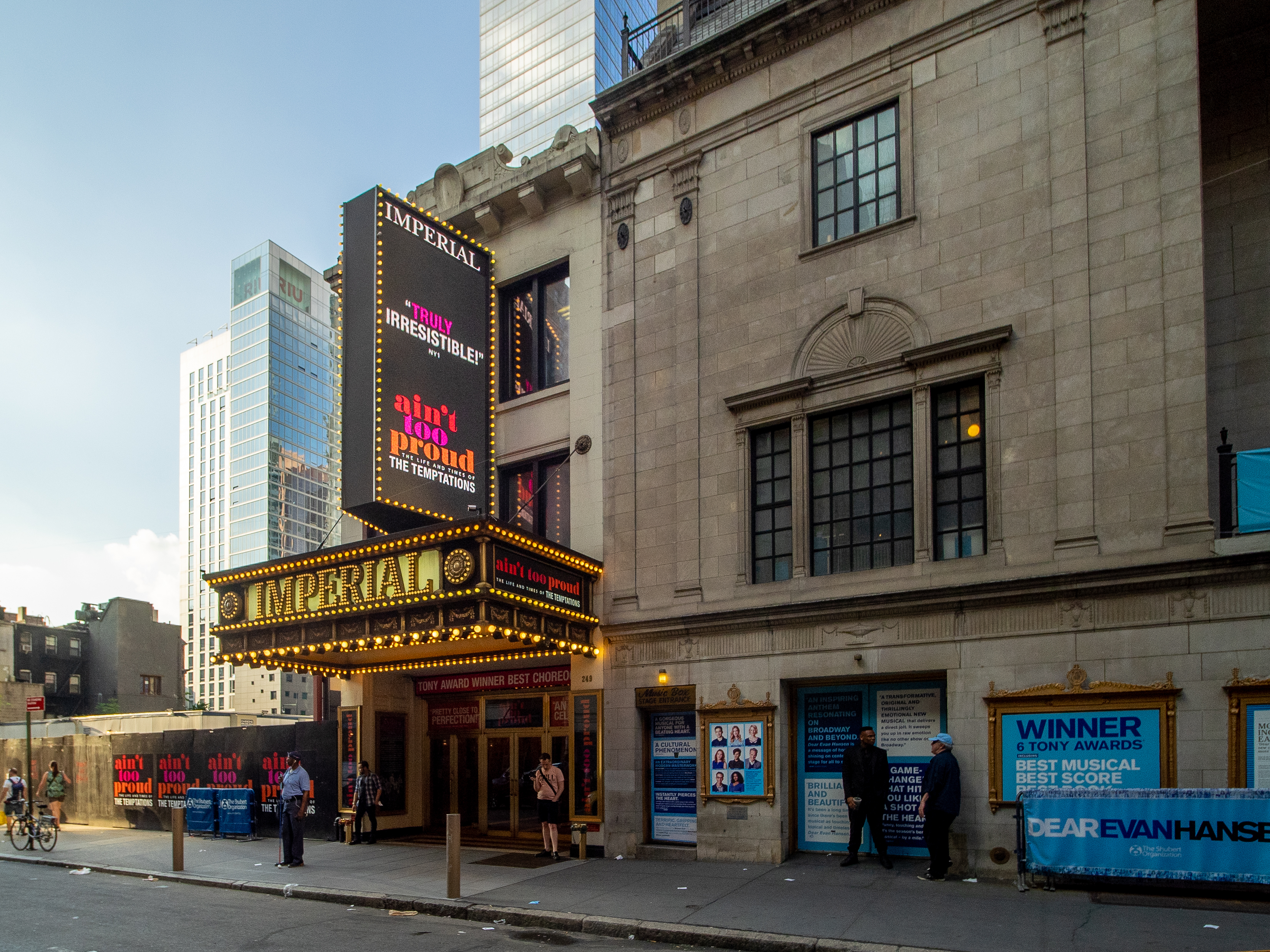
At the Imperial Theatre

The musical opened on Broadway in 2019 at the Imperial Theatre, with previews beginning February 28, 2019 and an opening night on March 21, 2019. As of March 12, 2020, the show suspended production due to the COVID-19 pandemic. On May 10, 2021, it was announced that the show would return to Broadway with a gala performance on October 16. The production had its final performance on January 16, 2022.

=== U.S. Equity Tour (2021) ===
It was announced on May 31, 2019, that the national equity tour would kick off in July 2020 at the Providence Performing Arts Center in Providence, Rhode Island. The premiere was postponed due to the COVID-19 pandemic. It opened at the Durham Performing Arts Center in Durham, North Carolina on December 7, 2021. It played its final performance on March 3, 2024, at the Saenger Theater in New Orleans, Louisiana.

=== West End (2023) ===
A production began performances in the West End at the Prince Edward Theatre on March 31, 2023. The show closed at the Prince Edward Theatre on 17 September 2023. The show was originally set to run until 7 January 2024.

=== U.S. 2nd National Tour (2024) ===
The non-union 2nd National Tour began performances at the CIBC Theatre in Chicago, Illinois on September 24, 2024. It played its final performance on July 27, 2025 at the Starlight Theatre in Kansas City, Missouri.

== Characters and original cast ==
| Character | Berkeley | Washington, DC | Los Angeles | Toronto | Broadway | U.S. Equity Tour | London | U.S. 2nd National Tour |
| Character | 2017 | 2018 | | | 2019 | 2021 | 2023 | 2024 |
|---|---|---|---|---|---|---|---|---|
| Otis Williams | Derrick Baskin | Derrick Baskin | Derrick Baskin | Derrick Baskin | Derrick Baskin | Marcus Paul James | Sifiso Mazibuko | Rudy Foster |
| Melvin Franklin | Jared Joseph | Jawan M. Jackson | Jawan M. Jackson | Jawan M. Jackson | Jawan M. Jackson | Harrell Holmes Jr. | Cameron Bernard Jones | Jameson Clanton |
| Eddie Kendricks | Jeremy Pope | Jeremy Pope | Jeremy Pope | Jeremy Pope | Jeremy Pope | Jalen Harris | Mitchell Zhangazha | Lowes Moore |
| Paul Williams | James Harkness | James Harkness | James Harkness | James Harkness | James Harkness | James T. Lane | Kyle Cox | Bryce Valle |
| David Ruffin | Ephraim Sykes | Ephraim Sykes | Ephraim Sykes | Ephraim Sykes | Ephraim Sykes | Elijah Ahmad Lewis | Tosh Wanogho-Maud | Josiah Travis Kent Rogers |
| Al Bryant | Jarvis B. Manning Jr. | Jarvis B. Manning Jr. | Jarvis B. Manning Jr. | Jarvis B. Manning Jr. | Jarvis B. Manning Jr. | Brett Michael Lockley | Michael James Stewart | Robert Crenshaw |
| Tammi Terrell | Nasia Thomas | Nasia Thomas | Nasia Thomas | Nasia Thomas | Nasia Thomas | Shayla Brielle G. | Evonnee Bentley-Holder | Kaila Symone Crowder |
| Johnnie Mae Matthews | Taylor Symone Jackson | Taylor Symone Jackson | Taylor Symone Jackson | Taylor Symone Jackson | Taylor Symone Jackson | Traci Elaine Lee | Sadie-Jean Shirley | Reyanna Edwards |
| Berry Gordy | Jahi Kearse | Jahi Kearse | Jahi Kearse | Jahi Kearse | Jahi Kearse | Michael Andreaus | Akmed Junior Khemalai | Kerry D'Jovanni |
| Smokey Robinson | Christian Thompson | Christian Thompson | Christian Thompson | Christian Thompson | Christian Thompson | Lawrence Dandridge | Ryan Carter | Cedric Jamaal Greene |
| Diana Ross | Candice Marie Woods | Candice Marie Woods | Candice Marie Woods | Candice Marie Woods | Candice Marie Woods | Deri'Andra Tucker | Holly Liburd | Jasmine Barboa |
| Josephine Miles | Rashidra Scott | Rashidra Scott | Rashidra Scott | Rashidra Scott | Rashidra Scott | Najah Hetsberger | Naomi Katiyo | Jasmine Barboa |
| Shelly Berger | Jeremy Cohen | Joshua Morgan | Joshua Morgan | Joshua Morgan | Joshua Morgan | Reed Campbell | Dylan Turner | Max Herskovitz |
| Dennis Edwards | Caliaf St. Aubyn | Caliaf St. Aubyn | Caliaf St. Aubyn | Caliaf St. Aubyn | Caliaf St. Aubyn | Harris Matthew | Posi Morakinyo | Jamal Stone |
| Richard Street | E. Clayton Cornelious | E. Clayton Cornelious | E. Clayton Cornelious | E. Clayton Cornelious | E. Clayton Cornelious | Devin Holloway | Simeon Montague | Mikey Corey Hassel |
| Lamont | Shawn Bowers | Shawn Bowers | Shawn Bowers | Shawn Bowers | Shawn Bowers | Gregory Carl Banks Jr. | Toyan Thomas-Browne | Mikey Corey Hassel |

=== Notable Cast Replacements ===
- Otis Williams: Nik Walker
- Eddie Kendricks: Jelani Remy
- Paul Williams: E. Clayton Cornelious
- David Ruffin: Matt Manuel, Corey Mekell
- Shelly Berger: Colin S. Kane

== Musical numbers ==
=== Original Berkeley Rep production ===
- "Ain't Too Proud to Beg"
- "All I Need"
- "Baby Love"
- "Ball of Confusion (That's What the World is Today)"
- "Cloud Nine"
- "Come See About Me"
- "Don't Look Back"
- "For Once in My Life"
- "Get Ready"
- "Gloria"
- "I Can't Get Next to You"
- "I Could Never Love Another (After Loving You)"
- "(I Know) I'm Losing You"
- "I Want a Love I Can See"
- "I Wish It Would Rain"
- "If You Don't Know Me by Now"
- "I'm Gonna Make You Love Me"
- "In the Still of the Night"
- "Just My Imagination (Running Away with Me)"
- "My Girl"
- "Papa Was a Rollin' Stone"
- "Runaway Child, Running Wild"
- "Shout"
- "Since I Lost My Baby"
- "Speedo"
- "Superstar (Remember How You Got Where You Are)"
- "The Way You Do the Things You Do"
- "War"
- "What Becomes of the Brokenhearted"
- "You Can't Hurry Love"
- "You're My Everything"

=== Original Broadway production ===
Act I

- "The Way You Do The Things You Do"
- "Runaway Child, Running Wild"
- "Gloria"
- "In The Still Of The Night"/"Speedo"
- "Shout"
- "I Want A Love I Can See"
- "My Girl"
- "Get Ready"
- Supremes Medley: "You Can't Hurry Love"/"Come See About Me"/"Baby Love"
- "Since I Lost My Baby "
- "Ain't Too Proud To Beg"
- "Don't Look Back"/"You're My Everything"
- "If I Could Build My Whole World Around You"
- "If You Don't Know Me By Now"
- "(I Know) I'm Losing You"
- "I Wish It Would Rain"
- "I Could Never Love Another (After Loving You)"

Act II

- "I Can't Get Next To You"
- "I'm Gonna Make You Love Me"
- "War"
- "Ball Of Confusion (That's What The World Is Today)"
- "Just My Imagination (Running Away With Me)"
- "Superstar (Remember How You Got Where You Are)"
- "For Once In My Life"
- "Papa Was A Rollin' Stone", Pt. 1
- "Cloud Nine"
- "Papa Was A Rollin' Stone", Pt. 2
- "What Becomes Of The Brokenhearted"
- "I Can't Get Next To You"

=== Recording ===
The original Broadway cast recording of Ain't Too Proud was recorded January 19–22, 2019 at Sound on Sound Studios, Montclair, NJ, and digitally released on March 22, 2019. The physical album released on April 19, and a double-LP vinyl was released on June 7.

== Awards and nominations ==
=== Broadway production ===
| Year | Award | Category | Nominee | Result |
|---|---|---|---|---|
| 2019 | Tony Awards | Best Musical | | Nominated |
| 2019 | Tony Awards | Best Performance by an Actor in a Leading Role in a Musical | Derrick Baskin | Nominated |
| 2019 | Tony Awards | Best Performance by an Actor in a Featured Role in a Musical | Jeremy Pope | Nominated |
| 2019 | Tony Awards | Best Performance by an Actor in a Featured Role in a Musical | Ephraim Sykes | Nominated |
| 2019 | Tony Awards | Best Book of a Musical | Dominique Morisseau | Nominated |
| 2019 | Tony Awards | Best Direction of a Musical | Des McAnuff | Nominated |
| 2019 | Tony Awards | Best Choreography | Sergio Trujillo | Won |
| 2019 | Tony Awards | Best Scenic Design in a Musical | Robert Brill & Peter Nigrini | Nominated |
| 2019 | Tony Awards | Best Costume Design in a Musical | Paul Tazewell | Nominated |
| 2019 | Tony Awards | Best Lighting Design in a Musical | Howell Binkley | Nominated |
| 2019 | Tony Awards | Best Sound Design of a Musical | Steve Canyon Kennedy | Nominated |
| 2019 | Tony Awards | Best Orchestrations | Harold Wheeler | Nominated |
| 2019 | Drama Desk Award | Outstanding Book of a Musical | Dominique Morisseau | Nominated |
| 2019 | Outer Critics Circle Awards | Outstanding Choreographer | Sergio Trujillo | Nominated |
| 2019 | Outer Critics Circle Awards | Outstanding Orchestrations | Harold Wheeler | Nominated |
| 2019 | Outer Critics Circle Awards | Outstanding Featured Actor in a Musical | Ephraim Sykes | Nominated |
| 2019 | Drama League Awards | Outstanding Production of a Broadway or Off-Broadway Musical | | Nominated |
| 2019 | Drama League Awards | Distinguished Performance Award | Jeremy Pope | Nominated |
| 2019 | Drama League Awards | Distinguished Performance Award | Ephraim Sykes | Nominated |
| 2019 | Broadway.com Audience Awards | Favorite Breakthrough Performance (Male) | Ephraim Sykes | Won |
| 2020 | Grammy Award | Best Musical Theater Album | Saint Aubyn, Derrick Baskin, James Harkness, Jawan M. Jackson, Jeremy Pope & Ephraim Sykes (principal soloists); Scott M. Riesett (producer) | Nominated |
