= Sergio Trujillo =

American dancer and choreographer

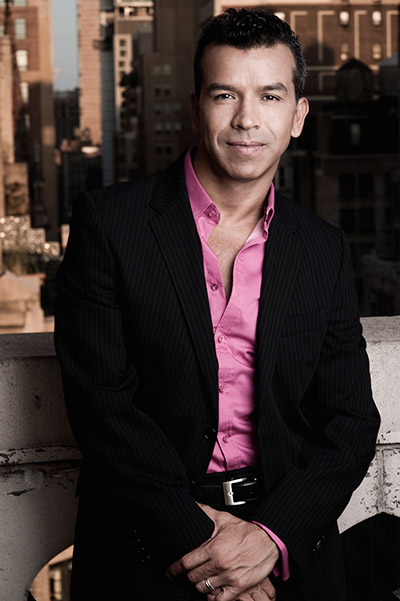
- Born: 1963 (age 62–63); Cali, Colombia
- Occupations: Dancer; choreographer; director; actor
- Spouse: Jack Noseworthy (m. 2011)
- Children: 1 (Lucas Alejandro Truworthy)

Sergio Trujillo (born 1963) is a Colombian-American theater director, choreographer, dancer, and actor. Born in Cali, Colombia and raised in Toronto, Canada, he is an American citizen and resides in New York City. Trujillo was nominated for the 2016 Tony Award for Best Choreography for On Your Feet!, and won the award in 2019 for Ain't Too Proud, becoming the first Hispanic recipient of the award. In 2015, he won the Laurence Olivier Award for Best Theatre Choreographer for Memphis.

He received his first Emmy Award nomination in 2021 for NBC’s Christmas in Rockefeller Center.

== Biography ==
Born in Cali, Colombia, Trujillo moved with his family to the Canadian suburb of North York, Toronto, with his family at age 12. Trujillo named his production company, Two Kings Productions in memory of his father and brother.

He studied science at the University of Toronto and later attended chiropractic school. However, he left school to pursue a dance career in New York City. Regarding his desire to become a choreographer, he said, "I knew that 'Fosse' would be my last show as a dancer when I began feeling limited by somebody else's work. I didn’t get to express myself, and I needed to do something about it."

In 2011, Trujillo had four shows simultaneously running on Broadway: Memphis, Jersey Boys, The Addams Family, and Next to Normal, the recipient of the 2010 Pulitzer Prize.

=== Broadway and off-Broadway ===
Trujillo made his Broadway debut as a performer in Jerome Robbins' Broadway in 1989. He also appeared in Guys and Dolls (1992), Victor/Victoria (1998), and Fosse (1999). He made his choreographic debut in 2005 with All Shook Up, followed up by Jersey Boys the same year.

Trujillo was the choreographer of the Broadway production of Summer: The Donna Summer Musical, for which he won a 2018 Chita Rivera Award for Dance and Choreography. Other Broadway credits include: On Your Feet! (Tony Award Nomination, Astaire Award), Hands on a Hardbody (Drama Desk nomination), Leap of Faith (Drama Desk Nomination), and Guys and Dolls (Astaire Awards nomination). In September 2023, it was announced that Trujillo would transfer his and Karla Puno's choreography from the Off-Broadway production of Days of Wine and Roses to Broadway in January 2024.

Off-Broadway, he choreographed Paul Simon's The Capeman at the Public Theater, Invisible Thread (2015 Lucille Lortel Award Nomination), Bare: A Pop Opera (2004), A Tree Grows in Brooklyn for City Center Encores!, The Great American Trailer Park Musical (2005), The Public Theater—Shakespeare in the Park (New York City's production of Romeo and Juliet), Kismet for Encores!, Saved (2008) for Playwrights Horizons (Lucille Lortel Award nomination), and Days of Wine and Roses (2023) for Atlantic Theater Company (with Karla Puno). He directed Gloria Estefan & Miami Sound Machine on Broadway at the Minskoff Theatre and was the director and choreographer of the digital concert ¡Viva Broadway! Hear Our Voices.

=== Regional and international theater ===
He was the director and choreographer for Arrabal at the American Repertory Theater in Boston, which earned him an Elliot Norton Award for direction, Cirque du Soleil's Paramour, as well as Flashdance the Musical, which had a North America tour from 2013 to 2015.

His regional theatre credits include Mambo Kings (San Francisco), Zhivago and The Wiz at the La Jolla Playhouse in San Diego, a US tour of Kiss of the Spider Woman (performer, mid-1990s), and West Side Story in 1999 and 2009 at the Stratford Festival, Canada. He also choreographed at the Village Theatre for their musical staging of The Wedding Banquet (2003). In the West End, he choreographed Peggy Sue Got Married. In 2007, he also choreographed the Disney musical Tarzan in Scheveningen.

Additional theatre credits include Carmen; An Afro-Cuban Musical (Helen Hayes Award nomination), Kiss of the Spider Woman (North Shore Music Theatre), Kiss Me Kate (Tokyo), Needfire (Royal Alexandra Theatre), a musical adaptation of Twelfth Night (Tokyo), and segments of Chita Rivera's Chita and All That Jazz. Trujillo is director and choreographer of Real Women Have Curves, a musical based on the play of the same name. The musical premiered in 2023.

=== Opera ===
Trujillo choreographed The Marriage of Figaro for the Los Angeles Opera and Salome for the New York City Opera.

== Personal life ==
In 2011, Trujillo married his long-time partner, actor Jack Noseworthy. They had been together since 1990. They have one son, born 2018.

== Awards and nominations ==
- 2025 Drama League Award for Outstanding Direction of a Musical – Real Women Have Curves (nominee)
- 2025 Drama Desk Award for Outstanding Direction of a Musical – Real Women Have Curves (nominee)
- 2021 Emmy Award for Outstanding Choreography – Christmas in Rockefeller Center (nominee)
- 2019 Tony Award for Best Choreography – Ain't Too Proud (winner)
- 2018 Chita Rivera Award for Outstanding Choreography in a Broadway Show – Summer: The Donna Summer Musical (winner)
- 2018 Elliot Norton Awards for Outstanding Director, Large Theater – Arrabal (winner)
- 2016 Tony Award for Best Choreography – On Your Feet! (nominee)
- 2016 Outer Critics Circle Award for Outstanding Choreography – On Your Feet!
- 2015 Olivier Award Best Theatre Choreographer – Memphis (winner)
- 2013 Drama Desk Award Outstanding Choreography – Hands on a Hardbody (nominee)
- 2012 Drama Desk Award Outstanding Choreography – Leap of Faith (nominee)
- 2010 Drama Desk Award Outstanding Choreography – Memphis - (nominee)
- 2010 Outer Critics Circle Award for Outstanding Choreography – Memphis - (winner tie)
- 2009 Lucille Lortel Award Outstanding Choreographer – Saved (nominee)
- 2006 Drama Desk Award Outstanding Choreography – Jersey Boys (nominee)
- 2003 Ovation Awards for Outstanding Choreography – Empire: A New Musical
