= National CineMedia =

American cinema advertising company

National CineMedia, Inc.
- Company type: Public
- Traded as: Nasdaq: NCMI; Russell 2000 Component
- Industry: Motion Picture Exhibition advertising
- Founded: 2002; 24 years ago, in Centennial, Colorado
- Fate: Chapter 11 Bankruptcy
- Headquarters: Centennial, Colorado, U.S.
- Key people: Tom Lesinski (CEO)
- Subsidiaries: National CineMedia, LLC (43.7%); Fathom Events (4%)
- Website: ncm.com

National CineMedia, Inc. (NCM) is an American cinema advertising company. NCM displays ads to U.S. consumers in movie theaters, online and through mobile technology. NCM presents cinema advertising across a digital in-theater network, consisting of theaters owned by AMC Theatres, Cinemark Theatres, Regal Cinemas and other regional theater circuits.

The publicly traded National CineMedia, Inc. owns 48.8% and is the managing partner of NCM. Regal's parent company Cineworld and Cinemark and hold the remainder of NCM shares. In May 2014, Screenvision entered into a merger agreement with NCM for US$375 million. The merger was blocked by the Department of Justice over antitrust concerns, since Screenvision and NCM together would supply advertising to 34,000 of the nation's 39,000 movie theaters. In March 2015, Screenvision and NCM terminated their deal and NCM paid Screenvision a $26.8 million termination payment.

The company is perhaps best known to the general public for its advertising pre-show, Noovie.

On April 11, 2023, the company filed for Chapter 11 bankruptcy.

== FirstLook ==
FirstLook (2006–2017) was NCM's pre-feature programming. FirstLook consisted of pre-show advertising and entertainment, provided by content partners such as ABC Networks, A&E Television Networks, Amazon, Disney, Fandango, Google, Hulu, Microsoft, NBC, Nintendo and Turner Broadcasting System interspersed with advertising. The program was approximately 20 minutes, and was timed to end exactly at the movie's start time, before any trailers.

FirstLook was the successor to Regal's The 2wenty preshow, introduced to that chain in 2003. FirstLook carried largely that same format, the main difference being that while 2wenty was Regal-exclusive, FirstLook was fed to founding members circuits AMC, Cinemark, and Regal, as well as many NCM affiliate circuits such as Goodrich Quality Theaters, Hollywood Theaters, and Kerasotes. It was also a successor to AMC's MovieWatcher Network.

Several different versions were provided depending on the movie's MPAA rating or format; G- or PG-rated family films often featured FirstLook Play, while 3D films featured a second segment, FirstLook 3D.

== Movie Night Out ==
Movie Night Out is an application for iOS and Android platforms, published by National CineMedia in 2010. The application allows users to organize an evening film viewing at a theatre as well as activities before and after the movie, such as dinner, coffee, dessert and shopping using a local data feed from Citysearch APIs.

== Noovie ==
In September 2017, NCM introduced a new pre-show known as Noovie; the new show includes new segments such as trivia games and augmented reality games via the Noovie ARCade mobile app, and new feature segments such as "Noovie Backlot" (which features behind-the-scenes content on upcoming films; the first partner for the segments was Walt Disney Studios, who featured segments focusing on its own upcoming films), and "Noovie Soundstage" (which featured filmed concert performances in partnership with Sony Music's content studio Rumble Yard. Noovie was designed as a multi-platform brand, with an accompanying website and social media outlets for film industry news.

Noovie was re-launched in December 2021 with new segments designed to make the show "more holistic".

== Fathom Events ==
Fathom Events, formerly known as NCM Fathom, was a division of National CineMedia that offered alternative entertainment events in movie theaters. In December 2013, it was announced that NCM was restructuring Fathom Events as a new stand-alone entity owned by AMC Theatres, Cinemark Theatres, Regal Cinemas and NCM, with NCM retaining a 4% stake in the company.

Past entertainment events have included:

- Metropolitan Opera live from New York City
- Live concerts (rock, pop, musical theater and others)
- Live sporting events (boxing, UFC, international soccer tournaments and others)
- Various films courtesy of Turner Classic Movies
- Live town halls and other original programming
- Filmed Broadway Musicals (e.g. Memphis: Direct from Broadway, Disney's Newsies: The Broadway Musical)
- National Theatre Live: filmed plays from the National Theatre in London
- Anime films (e.g. Mary and the Witch's Flower)
- Children's films

== NCM Digital ==
The NCM Digital offers 360-degree integrated marketing programs in combination with cinema, encompassing thousands of entertainment-related web sites and hundreds of mobile applications.

== Fantasy Movie League ==
In May 2017, NCM acquired Fantasy Movie League, a fantasy movie league where players have $1,000 a week to spend and try to pick a combination of films that are currently out that week that would lead to the most money the films made that weekend at the box office.

Since the purchase, it has also been promoted during Noovie.
