= Smokey Joe's Cafe: Direct from Broadway =

- DVD Cover Art
- Directed by: Don Roy King
- Based on: Smokey Joe's Cafe by Jerry Leiber; Mike Stoller
- Starring: B.J. Crosby; Adrian Bailey; Victor Trent Cook; Brenda Braxton; DeLee Lively; Deb Lyons; Ken Ard; Fredrick B Owens; Matt Bogart
- Music by: Jerry Leiber; Mike Stoller
- Distributed by: Broadway Worldwide
- Release date: August 10, 2000
- Running time: 105 minutes
- Country: United States
- Language: English

Smokey Joe's Cafe: Direct from Broadway is a 2000 film of the Broadway production of the musical revue Smokey Joe's Cafe as captured live in performance on Broadway featuring the show's final Broadway cast. The show was captured at Broadway's Virginia Theatre in New York City during the show's final Broadway performance utilizing multiple high-definition cameras by Broadway Worldwide.

The film was released September 10, 2000, on cable and satellite pay-per-view channels in the U.S., Canada, and Latin America. The program was released on DVD and VHS November 6, 2001 by GoodTimes Video, with a DVD re-release January 16, 2007 by Image Entertainment. HBO bought the program in December 2002 for a two-year contract on the network.

== Cast ==
The cast consisted of Ken Ard, Adrian Bailey, Matt Bogart, Brenda Braxton, Victor Trent Cook, B.J. Crosby, DeLee Lively, Deb Lyons, Fredrick B. Owens, and Virginia Woodruff.
