= De'Adre Aziza =

American actress and singer

De'Adre Imani Aziza
- Born: De'Adre Danielle Avery
- Occupations: Actress; Singer
- Years active: 2002–present

De'Adre Imani Aziza (/diˈeɪdrə əˈziːzə/) is an African-American actress and singer.

== Early life and education ==
She is the daughter of Donna L. Avery, retired part-time assistant professor and textiles specialist at Parsons The New School for Design. She attended the Harlem School of the Arts for eleven years and the Dance Theater of Harlem for four years. She is studied at the Tisch School of the Arts at New York University.

== Career ==
She received a Tony Award nomination for Best Featured Actress in a Musical for Passing Strange, in which she played "teenage goddess" Edwina Williams, Dutch neo-hippie Marianna, and German revolutionary/filmmaker Sudabey. She appeared again on Broadway in Women on the Verge of a Nervous Breakdown.

== Filmography ==
=== Film ===
Year	Title	Role	Notes
2002	Brown Sugar	Wedding Patron	
2004	L-o-v-e	Star	Short
2008	Miracle at St. Anna	Bailiff	
2011	Ronal the Barbarian	Amazon Queen	
2012	Red Hook Summer	Colleen Royale	
2012	Brutus Black	Brutus's Girl Friend	Short
2014	Da Sweet Blood of Jesus	Alto	
2014	In the Morning	Zuri	
2016	bwoy	Marcia	
2024	The Fire Inside	Mickey	

=== Television ===
Year	Title	Role	Notes
2003	Sex and the City	Bachelorette #1	Episode: "The Post-It Always Sticks Twice"
2005	Starved	Receptionist	Episode: "3D"
2009	Great Performances	Edwina/Marianna/Sudabey	Episode: "Passing Strange"
2010	Ugly Americans	(voice)	Episode: "Pilot"
2012	30 Rock	Trene	Episode: "Aunt Phatso vs. Jack Donaghy"
2013	666 Park Avenue	TV Reporter	Episode: "Lazarus"
2014	Person of Interest	Shari	Episode: "A House Divided"
2015	Blue Bloods	Sharon Parsons	Episode: "The Poor Door"
2015	Madam Secretary	Janice Dwyer	Episode: "Whisper of the Ax"
2015	The Good Wife	Tabitha Gray	Episode: "Red Meat"
2015	Master of None	President	Episode: "Hot Ticket"
2016	Kevin Can Wait	Danielle	Episode: "Kevin and Donna's Book Club"
2016	Bull	Wendy	Episode: "Just Tell the Truth"
2016	The Breaks	Tamika Grant	TV movie
2017	The Breaks	Tamika Grant	Main cast
2017–19	She's Gotta Have It	Raqueletta Moss	Recurring cast (season 1), main cast (season 2)
2018	Instinct	Ellen	Episode: "I Heart New York"
2018	Elementary	Krista	Episode: "Sober Companions"
2019	The Code	Nona Ferry	Episode: "Don and Doff" & "Legit Bad Day"
2019	Evil	Fiona Plemmons	Episode: "3 Stars"
2020	The Sinner	Mrs. Hughes	Episode: "Part II" & "Part VI"
2020–23	Power Book II: Ghost	Marshal Gwen Meredith	Recurring cast (season 1), guest (season 3)
2021	Younger	Azealia King	Episode: "Inku-baited" & "Older"
2021–23	Run the World	Donda Baptiste	Recurring cast
2023	East New York	Bettina Powell	Episode: "There Goes the Neighborhood"

=== Stage ===
Year	Title	Role	Notes
2007	Doris to Darlene A Cautionary Valentine	Doris	Playwrights Horizons, Off-Broadway
2008	Passing Strange	Edwina/Marianna/Sudabey	Belasco Theatre, Broadway
2010	We Are Here	Billie	Powerhouse Theater
2010	Women on the Verge of a Nervous Breakdown	Paulina	Belasco Theatre, Broadway
2011	The Hot L Baltimore	April Green	Steppenwolf Theatre Company
2012	Good Goods	Patricia	Yale Repertory Theatre
2013	Detroit '67	Bunny	The Public Theater, Off-Broadway
2013	The Comedy of Errors	Courtesan	The Public Theater, Off-Broadway
2013	Johnny Baseball	Daisy Wyatt	Williamstown Theatre Festival
2013	A Night with Janis Joplin	Joplinaire, Chantel, Nina Simone, Odetta	Lyceum Theatre, Broadway
2014	Piece of my Heart	Candace	Pershing Square Signature Center, Off-Broadway
2015	Paradise Blue	Silver	Williamstown Theatre Festival
2016	Privacy	Various	The Public Theater, Off-Broadway
2017	A Midsummer Nights Dream	Hippolyta	Shakespeare in the Park, Off-Broadway
2018	Eve's Song	Deborah	The Public Theater, Off-Broadway
2022	Clyde's	Clyde	Goodman Theatre
2022	Clyde's	Clyde	Mark Taper Forum
2024	Redwood	Mel	La Jolla Playhouse
2025	Redwood	Mel	Nederlander Theatre, Broadway
2026	Fences	Rose	Old Globe Theatre
