= Passing Strange =

Comedy-drama rock musical theater play

- Music: Stew; Heidi Rodewald
- Lyrics: Stew
- Book: Stew
- Productions: 2006 Berkeley; 2007 Off-Broadway; 2008 Broadway; 2010 Washington; 2011 St. Louis; 2018 Philadelphia; 2023 Arlington
- Awards: Tony Award for Best Book of a Musical

Passing Strange is a comedy-drama rock musical about a young African American's journey of self-discovery as an artist, while combining strong existentialist and meta-fictional elements (especially self-referential humor). The musical's lyrics and book are by Stew with music and orchestrations by Heidi Rodewald and Stew. It was created in collaboration with director Annie Dorsen.

The musical was developed at the Sundance Institute Theatre Lab in 2004 and 2005, one of the few works to be invited back for a second round of development. It had productions in Berkeley, California and Off-Broadway before opening on Broadway in 2008, garnering strong reviews and several awards. Spike Lee filmed the musical on Broadway in July 2008, premiering the film in 2009.

== Title ==
Stew had never written a play before Passing Strange. In an interview with Berkeley Rep, where the play premiered, he said he was initially inspired by reading about the Globe Theatre, where Shakespeare productions were originally performed in front of rowdy audiences. A longtime rock musician and performer, he wanted to combine the energy of a rock show with the lively potential of a theater setting. Stew stated that the title "Passing Strange" comes from Shakespeare's 1603 play Othello, the Moor of Venice. In the play, the title character utters the following lines:

My story being done,
She gave me for my pains a world of sighs;
She swore, in faith 'twas strange, 'twas passing strange;
'Twas pitiful. 'twas wondrous pitiful,
She wish'd she had not heard it, yet she wish'd
That heaven had made her such a man.

—Othello, the Moor of Venice, act 1, scene 3, lines 158–163

Stew commented that the quote reminds him of a rock musician who tries to attract a girl with his on-the-road stories. "Passing" in Early Modern English meant "extremely" (thus, the meaning of "extremely strange" in the above passage). However, in the play's title, it also refers to the history of Black Americans "passing" (that is, "passing as white"), a concept raised multiple times in the play, as well as the passage of time.

== Background ==
The plot itself involves an anonymous protagonist, called the Youth, who travels on a picaresque journey to find "the real", complicated by his need to rebel against his mother and society, "passing" through place to place and from lover to lover. His experiences are shaped by his black, American, and middle-class identity. As a musician, he attempts to express his true self through a number of musical genres, including gospel, punk, blues, jazz, and rock; however, the musical itself is most prominently grounded in rock music.

Stew summarized the story and the music: "It's ... about the costs of being a young artist. It's a 46-year-old guy looking back at the things that he did and the values he had in his 20s, sort of when you're making that decision to really be an artist ... We knew we were going to invent something 'cause we kind of knew this hadn't been done before, the goal being to bring the actual music that one hears in a club to the stage — not through some kind of theatrical musical-theater filter".

The musical was nominated for seven Tony Awards, winning one, for best book. It won three Drama Desk Awards, however, for outstanding musical, music and lyrics (out of seven nominations), among a number of other awards and nominations. The musical was also awarded the New York Drama Critics Circle Award for Best Musical; the Audelco Award for Best Musical, as well as Best Director (Annie Dorsen), Best Musical Director (Rodewald), and Best Performance (Daniel Breaker); and an Obie Award for Best New Theatre Piece, as well as Outstanding Ensemble.

== Production history ==
Passing Strange premiered on October 19, 2006, at the Berkeley Repertory Theatre in Berkeley, California. It was then produced off-Broadway at The Public Theater in New York City, running from May 14, 2007, through June 3, 2007. The musical began previews at the Belasco Theatre on Broadway on February 8, 2008, and officially opened on February 28, 2008, with the same cast that starred at the Public Theater. After 165 performances, it closed on July 20, 2008. Directed by Annie Dorsen, the musical was choreographed by Karole Armitage, with scenic design by David Korins, costume design by Elizabeth Hope Clancy and lighting design by Kevin Adams.

The first regional production opened at The Studio Theatre in Washington, D.C., on July 18, 2010, with a revised script and ran through August. It did not include co-creator Stew as the Narrator, and the cast was expanded from seven to fourteen players. "Passing Strange" played at ACT Theatre in Seattle, WA in June and July, 2014 with LeRoy Bell of "The Voice" in the lead role.

The first production in a high school opened at The Beacon School in New York on May 8, 2014, completely uncensored. Stew would later work with members of the Beacon School cast where they performed numbers from Passing Strange with him at Lincoln Center.

The musical had its European premiere at the Young Vic in London from 14 May until 6 July 2024. The production was directed by Liesl Tommy and starred Giles Terera, Rachel Adedeji and Keenan Munn-Francis. The production will transfer to the American Repertory Theater in May 2025 with Terera reprising his role.

== Synopsis ==
=== Act I ===
The Narrator introduces himself as Stew ("Prologue"), openly referring to himself, his collaborator Heidi, and the rest of the band, and occasionally interrupting the plot and interacting directly with the characters throughout the play. The Narrator introduces the African-American male protagonist as "the Youth"—whom the Narrator also refers to as the "hero" or "pilgrim". In a late 1970s South Central Los Angeles middle-class neighborhood, the Youth begins searching for "the real" during his teenaged years, having just briefly turned to Zen Buddhism in defiance of his single mother's conservative Christian faith ("Baptist Fashion Show"). Regardless, he is reluctantly dragged to her church and feels surprisingly moved by the church's gospel band, joyfully equating gospel to rock & roll ("Blues Revelation / Freight Train") and, deciding to explore the spiritual power of music, he joins the church choir ("Edwina Williams"). Here, he meets the pastor's son and choir director, Franklin Jones, who as a marijuana-smoking closeted gay man, exposes the Youth to drugs, New Negro culture, and European philosophy ("Arlington Hill"). The Youth eventually begins playing guitar, deserts Franklin's choir, and forms a punk rock band ("Sole Brother"), which quickly dissolves during a bad LSD trip ("Must've Been High").

The Youth saves money to travel to Europe where he hopes to truly develop as a musical artist, despite his mother and community's disapproval ("Mom Song / Philistines"), culminating in an argument that satirizes the overly dramatic styles of European experimental cinema and which soon merges onstage into the actual journey to Europe ("Merci Beaucoup, M. Godard"). Now in promiscuous Amsterdam, with its easy access to drugs and sex ("Amsterdam"), the Youth experiences his first sense of acceptance when a local squatter, Marianna, unquestioningly accepts him into her apartment ("Keys"). After happily living among Marianna and other free-spirited artists ("We Just Had Sex"), he finds he cannot write songs when he has nothing to complain about. He heads to Berlin, leaving behind an upset Marianna, who tells him not to return ("Paradise").

=== Act 2 ===
The Youth arrives in West Berlin during a May Day riot ("May Day"), joining some of the performance-artist protesters ("Surface"). His integrity falters when he misrepresents himself as poor to be accepted by the revolutionary artists whom he now lives with, collectively called Nowhaus. Desi, his new girlfriend and the Nowhaus leader, tells him that only love is real ("Damage").

The Youth can never bring himself to be honest about his background ("Identity"), though he basks in a romanticized African-American stereotype amidst his German friends ("The Black One"). Desi finally expresses her feelings that the Youth is concealing his true identity ("Come Down Now"). Meanwhile, he is irritated by his heartsick mother's phone calls and delays visiting her, even with Christmas approaching, when the other Nowhaus members abruptly return home to their families. The Youth pleads with Desi to stay with him during the holidays, but they fight over their differing views on love and she leaves him ("Youth's Unfinished Song").

The Narrator's self-reflections promptly enter into the Youth's story ("Work the Wound"), concluding with the unexpected scene of the Youth at his mother's funeral. With this surprisingly dramatic turns of events, the tone of the play shifts from largely comedic to suddenly heavy-hearted. The Narrator and the Youth confront each other directly and in a serious moment for the first time as the Youth copes with his grief; dealing with the loss of the same mother, it is clear now that the Narrator and Youth represent the same person at two different times in his life ("Passing Phase"). The Youth, after declaring that only art can correct the mistake known as life, resurrects his mother's spirit through his art ("Is It Alright?"). Ultimately, however, only the more mature Narrator remains onstage, professing the need for something beyond "the real" and that this is love ("Love Like That").

== Song list ==
Act 1

- "Prologue: We Might Play All Night" — Narrator and the Band
- "Baptist Fashion Show" — Narrator, Band and Ensemble
- "Blues Revelation; Freight Train":
  - "Listening is Waiting" ^{†} — Heidi (from the Band) and Narrator
  - "Church Blues Revelation" — Reverend Jones, Narrator and Ensemble
  - "Music is the Freight Train in which God Travels" — Narrator and Ensemble
- "Edwina Williams" — Edwina and Narrator
- "Arlington Hill" ^{†}; "Everything's Alright" — Narrator; Narrator and Ensemble
- "Sole Brother" — Youth, Terry and Sherry
- "Must've Been High" ^{†} — Narrator
- "Mom Song"; "Philistines" — Narrator, Mother and Ensemble; Youth and Ensemble
- "Merci Beaucoup, M. Godard" — Narrator and Stewardesses
- "Amsterdam" — Band and Ensemble
- "Keys":
  - "Keys #1" — Marianna and Youth
  - "Keys #2" — Narrator
  - "It's Alright" — Narrator and Ensemble
- "We Just Had Sex" — Youth, Marianna and Renata
- "Paradise":
  - "Paradise/Stoned" ^{‡} — Youth, Marianna and Ensemble
  - "Keys (Reprise)" ^{†} — Youth and Narrator
  - "Paradise (Reprise)/Starting to Feel Real" ^{‡} — Youth, Marianna, Band and Ensemble

Act 2

- "May Day":
  - "Berlin: A Black Hole with Taxis" — Narrator
  - "May Day (There's a Riot Goin' Down)" ^{†} — Narrator, Heidi, Youth, Nowhaus and Ensemble
  - "Desi" ^{†} — Narrator, Youth, Desi and Ensemble
  - "Are You Ready to Explode?" — Narrator and Ensemble
- "Surface":
  - "What's Inside is Just a Lie" — Mr. Venus
  - "Are You Ready to Explode? (Reprise)" — Mr. Venus, Youth and Ensemble
- "The System Does All Kinds of Damage" ^{†} — Narrator, Desi and Youth
- "Identity" — Youth
- "The Black One" — Narrator and Ensemble
- "Come Down Now":
  - "Listening is Waiting (Reprise)" ^{†} — Heidi
  - "Come Down Now" — Desi and Heidi
  - "Starting to Feel Real (Reprise)" — Narrator, Desi, Heidi and Ensemble
- "Youth's Unfinished Song" — Youth
- "Work the Wound" — Narrator
- "Passing Phase" — Youth and Narrator
- "Cue Music (Is It Alright?)" ^{†} — Narrator and Mother
- "Epilogue: Love Like That" — Narrator and Heidi
- Encore: "It's Alright" — All

^{†} In the staged performance, this song is heavily interspersed with or broken up by dialogue and/or spoken narration.
^{‡} The two titles here enclosed within a single pair of quotation marks and separated by a slash refer to two songs that play in counterpoint.

== Characters ==
All actors except those playing the Narrator, Youth, and Mother also play miscellaneous, nameless roles such as church-goers, family members, airplane stewardesses, etc. Major roles are emphasized in boldface.

Character	Original Broadway Cast	Description
**Narrator**	Stew	The teller of the Youth's story through song and speech
**Youth**	Daniel Breaker	The young African-American protagonist from South Central Los Angeles
**Mother**	Eisa Davis	The Youth's single parent
**Mr. Franklin Jones**	Colman Domingo	The closeted gay son of Reverend Jones; church pianist and choir director
**Marianna**	De'Adre Aziza	A "neo-hippie" from Amsterdam
**Desi**	Rebecca Naomi Jones	A Marxist revolutionary from West Berlin and leader of Nowhaus
**Mr. Venus**	Colman Domingo	A flamboyant protest artist from West Berlin
Edwina Williams	De'Adre Aziza	An attractive girl in the church choir; a "teenage goddess"
Reverend Jones	Chad Goodridge	The leader of Mother's church congregation
Sherry and Terry	Rebecca Naomi Jones and Chad Goodridge	The two other members of the Youth's punk rock trio
Renata Holiday	Rebecca Naomi Jones	A friend of Marianna's and an abstract artist
Christophe	Chad Goodridge	A friend of Marianna's and a philosophy professor and sex worker
Joop	Colman Domingo	A friend of Marianna's and a naturist
Sudabey	De'Adre Aziza	A member of Nowhaus and an avant-garde filmmaker
Hugo	Chad Goodridge	A member of Nowhaus and Desi's ex-boyfriend

== Passing Strange: The Movie ==
Director Spike Lee made a permanent record of the Broadway production "for generations and generations to see" by filming the last three performances at the Belasco Theatre. His feature film had its world premiere on January 16 at the 2009 Sundance Film Festival and opened at the IFC Center in New York City's West Village on August 21, 2009. It aired on PBS as part of Great Performances.

== Critical reaction ==
Reviews on and off Broadway were positive. Charles Isherwood wrote in The New York Times: "Although it is far richer in wit, feeling and sheer personality than most of what is classified as musical theater in the neighborhood around Times Square these days, its big heart throbs to the sound of electric guitars, searing synthesizer chords, driving drums and lyrics delivered not in a clean croon but a throaty yelp... Passing Strange is bursting at the seams with melodic songs, and it features a handful of theatrical performances to treasure... Call it a rock concert with a story to tell, trimmed with a lot of great jokes. Or call it a sprawling work of performance art, complete with angry rants and scary drag queens... I'll just call it wonderful, and a welcome anomaly on Broadway". Hilton Als praised the storyline of the musical in The New Yorker: "Passing Strange is a brilliant work about migration — a geographical migration but also its hero’s migration beyond the tenets of “blackness” and toward selfhood. ...Stew, who created Passing Strange, which is an autobiography of sorts, doesn't distract us with exoticism or nostalgia; his story centers on a young black man who discovers his own Americanness while growing up, first, in Los Angeles and, later, in Europe. The Youth (Daniel Breaker) is a rock-and-roll Candide — a wanderer whose innocence is never entirely corrupted".

Spike Lee's documentary of the play also received a positive review by A. O. Scott in The New York Times: "Here’s the strange thing. When I saw Spike Lee’s film adaptation, 'Passing Strange: The Movie,' in effect a video recording of a performance identical to the one I’d witnessed at the Belasco Theater in 2008, I was blown away. Loose ends ceased to dangle; soft spots were smoothed away and slow passages tightened up". Laremy Legel of Film.com called the film “vibrant and compelling” noting that Lee's decision to shoot it as a play was the right one: “Spike Lee, to his credit, realized the beauty of the musical was right there on stage – no further tinkering was needed. Spike used 14 cameras at once to capture the action like it's never been done before. Amazingly, you never see a camera you weren't meant to see. Intimate shots were gathered in gorgeous high-definition over the course of three shows and seamlessly edited together. It's a technological triumph as well as an artistic one".

== Awards and nominations ==
=== Original Broadway production ===
Year	Award Ceremony	Category	Nominee	Result
2008	Tony Award	Best Musical		Nominated
2008	Tony Award	Best Book of a Musical	Stew	Won
2008	Tony Award	Best Original Score	Stew and Heidi Rodewald	Nominated
2008	Tony Award	Best Performance by a Leading Actor in a Musical	Stew	Nominated
2008	Tony Award	Best Performance by a Featured Actor in a Musical	Daniel Breaker	Nominated
2008	Tony Award	Best Performance by a Featured Actress in a Musical	De'Adre Aziza	Nominated
2008	Tony Award	Best Orchestrations	Stew and Heidi Rodewald	Nominated
2008	Drama Desk Award	Outstanding Musical		Won
2008	Drama Desk Award	Outstanding Book of a Musical	Stew	Nominated
2008	Drama Desk Award	Outstanding Actor in a Musical	Daniel Breaker	Nominated
2008	Drama Desk Award	Outstanding Choreography	Karole Armitage	Nominated
2008	Drama Desk Award	Outstanding Lyrics	Stew	Won
2008	Drama Desk Award	Outstanding Music	Stew and Heidi Rodewald	Won
2008	Drama Desk Award	Outstanding Orchestrations	Stew and Heidi Rodewald	Nominated
2008	New York Drama Critics' Circle Award	Best Musical	Stew and Heidi Rodewald	Won

=== Passing Strange: The Movie ===
Year	Award Ceremony	Category	Nominee	Result
2010	Black Reel Award	Best Documentary		Nominated
2010	Black Reel Award	Best Ensemble		Nominated
2010	Black Reel Award	Best Director	Spike Lee	Nominated
2010	Black Reel Award	Best Original or Adapted Song	"Keys" by Daniel Breaker and De'Adre Aziza	Nominated
