= Berkeley Repertory Theatre =

Theatre company in Berkeley, California, USA

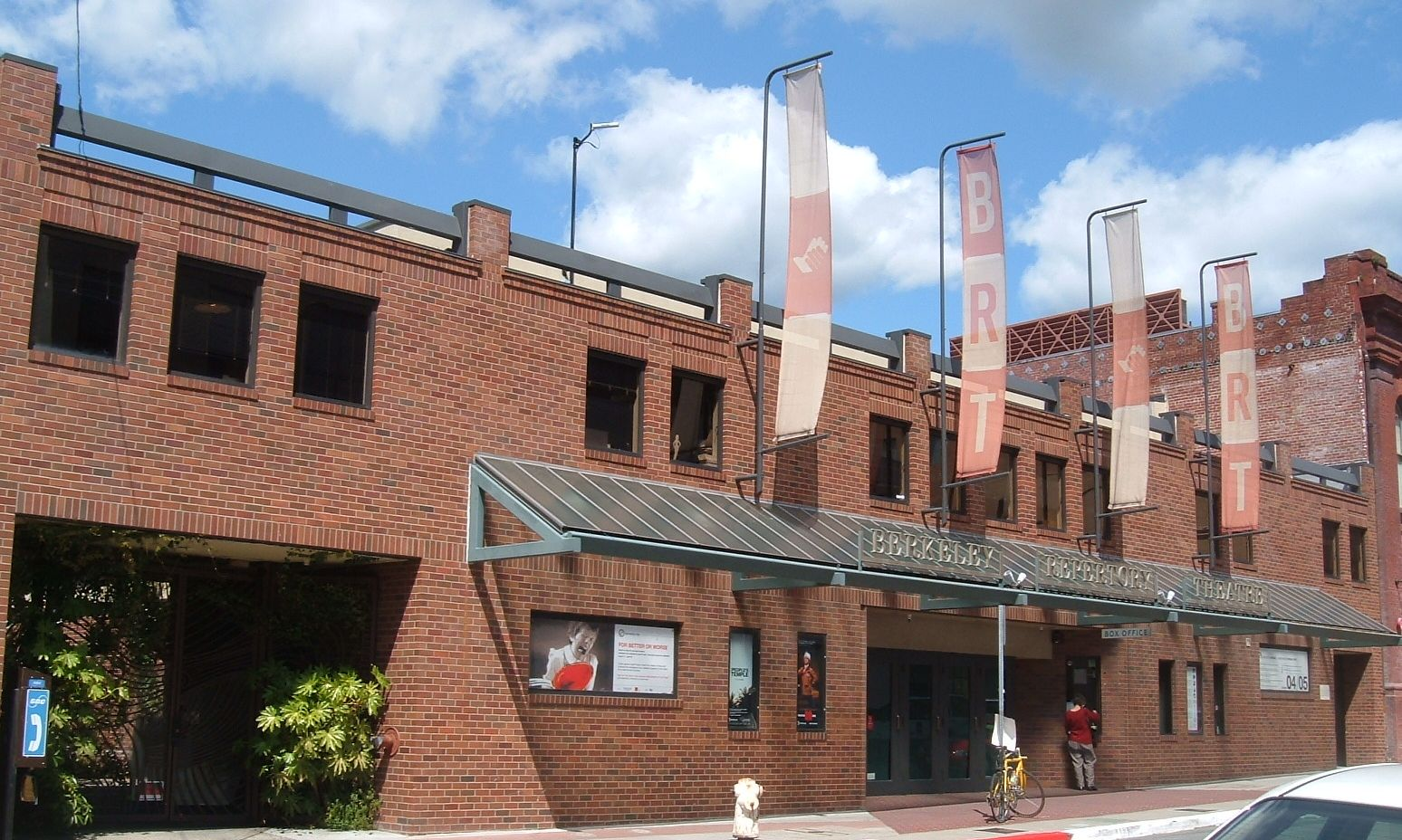
- Interactive map of Berkeley Repertory Theatre
- Address: 2025 Addison Street; Berkeley, California; United States
- Coordinates: 37°52′16.06″N 122°16′9.47″W
- Capacity: Thrust Stage: 401; Roda Theatre: 600
- Type: Regional theater
- Public transit: Downtown Berkeley

Construction
- Opened: 1968 (company); 1980: Thrust Stage; 2001: Roda Theatre

Website
- www.berkeleyrep.org

Berkeley Repertory Theatre is a regional theater company located in Berkeley, California. It runs seven productions each season from its two stages in Downtown Berkeley.

== History ==
The company was founded in 1968, as the East Bay's first resident professional theatre. Michael Leibert was the founding artistic director, who was then succeeded by Sharon Ott in 1984. The company won the Regional Theatre Tony Award in 1997. The theater added the 600-seat proscenium Roda Theatre next door to its existing 400-seat asymmetrical thrust stage in 2001, as well as opening its Berkeley Rep School of Theatre the same year. Its current Artistic Director is Johanna Pfaelzer, who took on the position in September 2019. Susan Medak was the General Manager and a board member and former President of the League of Resident Theatres. Susie was replaced by Tom Parrish in 2022.

Productions are a mix of classic modern plays such as Henrik Ibsen's Ghosts and Terrence McNally's Master Class, the latter featuring Rita Moreno as opera diva Maria Callas, and significant recent plays with many West Coast premieres such as Moisés Kaufman's The Laramie Project and Tony Kushner's Homebody/Kabul and even world premieres such as Kushner's Hydriotaphia and Charles Mee's Fetes De La Nuit.

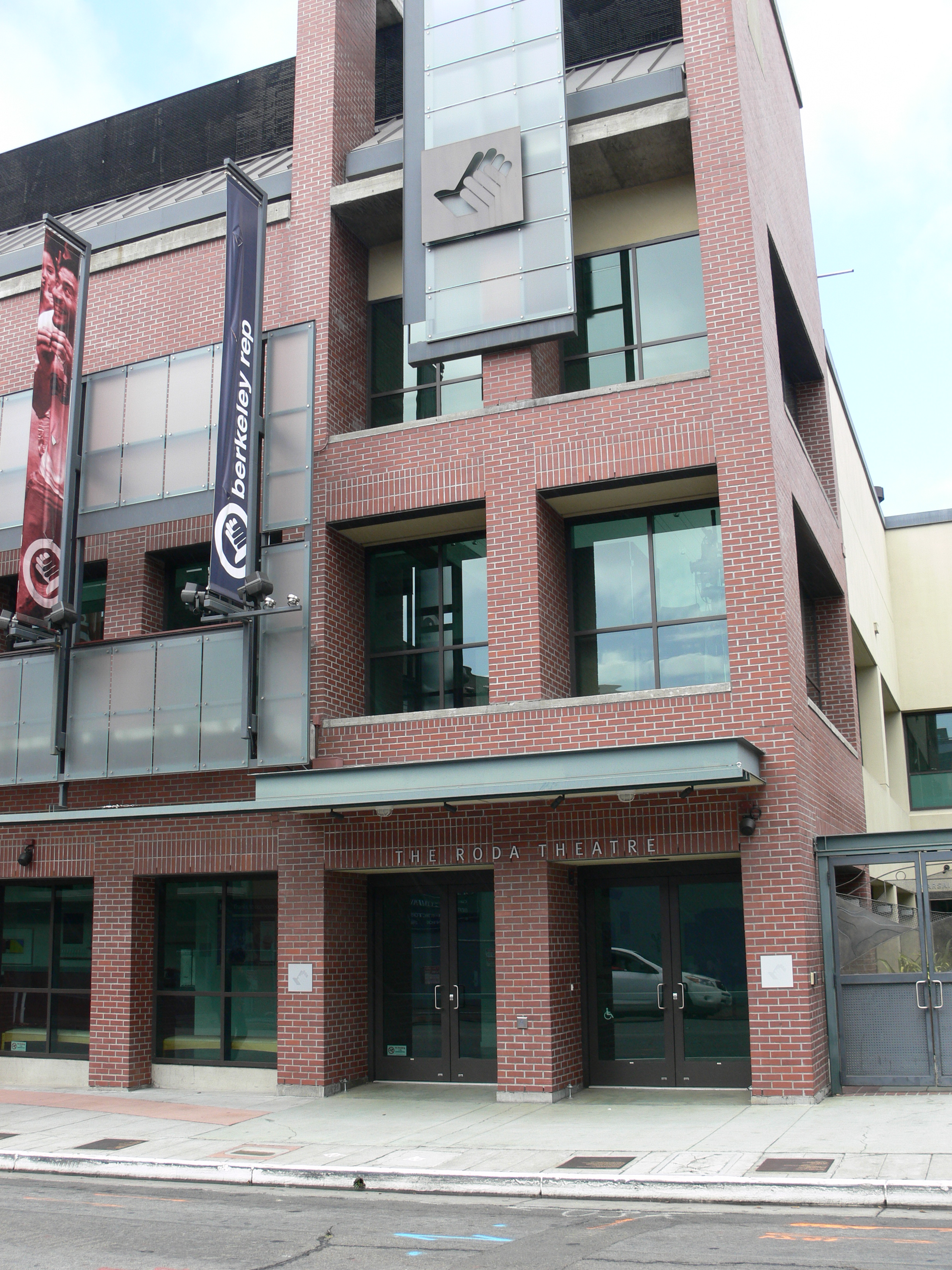
The Roda Theatre

In the past decade alone, Berkeley Rep has premiered new works by Culture Clash, David Edgar, Francesca Faridany, Leigh Fondakowski, Lillian Groag, Jordan Harrison, Geoff Hoyle, Naomi Iizuka, Charles Mee, and Stew. The Theatre has recently created a string of successes that transferred from Berkeley to Manhattan: Artistic Director Tony Taccone staged Sarah Jones' Tony Award-winning Bridge & Tunnel on Broadway in 2006, and helmed Tony Kushner and Maurice Sendak's Brundibar in 2007. That summer, Sarah Ruhl's Eurydice and Stew's Passing Strange both enjoyed extended off-Broadway runs. Passing Strange opened on Broadway in March 2008.

Berkeley Rep bolsters its commitment to new works through The Ground Floor (Berkeley Rep's Center for the Creation and Development of New Work) and year-long Fellowship Program aimed at training the next generation of theatre professionals.

In 2001, the theatre opened Berkeley Rep School of Theatre, which offers training in various theatrical disciplines for all ages and abilities. Located next door to Berkeley Rep's two stages, the School of Theatre also provides a home base for the company's outreach education programs with local teachers and classes. The Berkeley Rep School of Theatre also has a Teen Council made for bay area high school students interested in theatre. The Berkeley Rep Teen Council is most noted for its annual Teen One Acts Festival, completely written, directed, produced, and acted by students.

The theatre opened their 2009–10 season with the original stage production of the Green Day-inspired musical American Idiot, based on the band's concept album of the same name. The hugely popular show was originally scheduled to run from September 4 through October 11, but was extended twice, finally ending on November 15. The show subsequently opened on Broadway at the St. James Theatre on April 20, 2010.

The musical Ain't Too Proud: The Life and Times of the Temptations, a jukebox musical based on the story of the Motown group The Temptations, started performance at Berkeley Rep August 31, 2018. It was originally scheduled to run through October 8, but was later extended through October 22 and again through November 5. The musical was the highest-grossing production in the theatre's history. The show had runs at other regional theaters before transferring to Broadway, opening at the Imperial Theatre on March 21, 2019.

== Premieres ==
1994

- The Woman Warrior

1995

- Ballad of Yachiyo

1998

- Hydriotaphia

2002

- Mennochio

2003

- Continental Divide

2005

- Fetes de la Nuit
- The People's Temple

2006

- Passing Strange

2009

- American Idiot
- In the Next Room (or the vibrator play)

2010

- Girlfriend
- Lemony Snicket's The Composer is Dead
- Compulsion (co-production with Public Theatre)

2011

- How to Write a New Book for the Bible (co-production with Seattle Repertory Theatre)
- Rita Moreno:Life Without Makeup

2012

- Ghost Light (co-production with Oregon Shakespeare Festival)
- Emotional Creature
- The White Snake (co-production with Oregon Shakespeare Festival)
- Black n Blue Boys (co-production with Goodman Theatre)

2013

- Fallaci
- Troublemaker, or the Freakin Kick A Adventures of Bradley Boatright

2014

- The House that will not Stand (co-production with Yale Repertory Theatre)
- An Audience with Meow Meow

2015

- X's and O's (A Football Love Story)
- Amélie, A New Musical

2016

- It Can't Happen Here
- The Last Tiger in Haiti (co-production with La Jolla Playhouse)
- Aubergine
- John Leguizamo: Latin History for Morons

2017

- Monsoon Wedding
- Imaginary Comforts, or The Story of the Ghost of the Dead Rabbit
- Ain't Too Proud: The Life and Times of the Temptations

2018

- Fairview (in association with Soho Rep.)
- Paradise Square: A New Musical

2019

- Kiss My Aztec!
- Becky Nurse of Salem

2020

- Swept Away
- It Can't Happen Here (Radio Play format)

== See also ==
- American Conservatory Theater, San Francisco
- Marin Theatre Company, Mill Valley, California
- San Jose Repertory Theatre
- TheatreWorks, Palo Alto, California
- San Francisco Playhouse, San Francisco, California
- Shotgun Players, Berkeley, California
- Aurora Theatre (Berkeley)
