= Broadway Worldwide =

Distributor of Broadway musical tapings

Broadway Worldwide, Inc.
- Industry: Film
- Founded: 1995
- Founder: Bruce Brandwen
- Headquarters: New York City, New York, United States
- Products: Motion pictures
- Website: broadwayonline.com

Broadway Worldwide was established in 1995 as a worldwide distributor of Broadway musicals captured live-in-performance for digital cinema, DVD, video on demand (VOD), pay per view (PPV), pay TV, wired and wireless television. Since it started, Broadway Worldwide has captured and distributed Smokey Joe's Cafe, Stephen Sondheim's Putting It Together starring Carol Burnett, Jekyll & Hyde the Musical starring David Hasselhoff, and the 2010 Tony Award for Best Musical winner, Memphis.

== Production process ==
Broadway Worldwide records Broadway musicals, live-in-performance, on the broadway stage during a show's New York run, in front of paying audiences. Prior to recording, Broadway Worldwide's team works with the Broadway artists who created the stage show to determine and implement the optimal approach to depict the material. Performances are recorded using 10 to 12 hand-held, stationary and robotic cameras and as many as 70 microphones positioned throughout the theatre. High-definition video and 5.1 surround sound audio equipment is used to capture the productions.

== Broadway productions filmed ==
=== Smokey Joe’s Cafe (2000) ===
Broadway Worldwide's first foray into recording Broadway shows occurred with the performance of Smokey Joe’s Cafe: The Songs of Leiber and Stoller, the longest-running musical revue in Broadway history. Broadway Worldwide utilized 11 high-definition cameras strategically positioned onstage, backstage and around the theatre, and 40 microphones to capture the performance. The show was directed for Broadway Worldwide by Emmy winner Don Roy King.

Smokey Joe's Cafe features the original Tony Award-nominated cast performing 40 songs by the songwriting team Jerry Leiber and Mike Stoller. The songs performed include: "Jailhouse Rock", "Hound Dog", "Treat Me Nice", "Stand By Me", "Spanish Harlem", and "On Broadway". Smokey Joe’s Cafe received a Grammy Award, as well as seven Tony Award nominations including one for Best Musical.

Cast members of Smokey Joe's Cafe are: Victor Trent Cook, B. J. Crosby, Brenda Braxton and DeLee Lively (all Tony Award-nominated), Ken Ard, Adrian Bailey, Matt Bogart, Deb Lyon, and Fred Owens. The show was directed on Broadway by four-time Tony winner Jerry Zaks.

=== Putting It Together (2000) ===
Only a short while after the taping of Smokey Joe’s Cafe was completed, producer Cameron Mackintosh approached Broadway Worldwide executives about licensing his Broadway production of the Stephen Sondheim musical review, Putting It Together. Featuring an ensemble headed by Carol Burnett, Putting It Together is a celebration of the songs of multiple Tony Award-winner Stephen Sondheim. The production was directed for Broadway Worldwide by Emmy winner Don Roy King.

Co-starring with Ms. Burnett are Tony Award-winner George Hearn (La Cage aux Folles, Sunset Boulevard), Olivier Award nominee John Barrowman (The Fix), Olivier Award winner Ruthie Henshall (She Loves Me) and Bronson Pinchot (Perfect Strangers). The Broadway show was directed by Eric D. Schaeffer, with musical staging by Bob Avian.

Among the shows from which the musical numbers come are: A Funny Thing Happened On the Way to the Forum (1962); Anyone Can Whistle (1964); Company (1970); Follies (1971); A Little Night Music (1973); The Frogs (1974); Sweeney Todd (1979); Merrily We Roll Along (1981); Sunday in the Park with George (1984); Into the Woods (1987); Assassins (1991); the film Dick Tracy (1990) and an un-produced television musical, Do You Hear a Waltz? (1962).

Putting It Together was also recorded in high definition with 10 cameras. The music of Stephen Sondheim, featuring orchestrations by Academy Award, Tony Award, and Emmy Award, winner Jonathan Tunick, was captured in 5.1 surround sound.

=== Jekyll & Hyde: The Musical (2001) ===
Broadway Worldwide captured its third Broadway musical, the Frank Wildhorn and Leslie Bricusse musical Jekyll & Hyde, starring David Hasselhoff.

Being the longest-running show in the history of Broadway's Plymouth Theatre, the production broke the house record at the Plymouth Theatre on three occasions and ran for over 1,500 performances. Additionally, the show has won a legion of repeat visitors, dubbed by the press as "Jekkies", with some hardcore fans having seen the show hundreds of times.

David Hasselhoff, listed in the Guinness Book of World Records as "The Most Watched TV Star in the World", first came to the attention of American audiences through his role as Dr. Snapper Foster on The Young and the Restless. After six years he was lured to NBC by Brandon Tartikoff to star as Michael Knight in the series Knight Rider. He made television history when his next series, Baywatch, was canceled by NBC and acquired by Hasselhoff and his partners. Hasselhoff's single, "Looking for Freedom", remained in the number 1 spot on the German charts for eight weeks and he has continued to perform in concert, releasing nine gold and platinum albums to date.

Jekyll & Hyde also stars Coleen Sexton as Lucy, Andrea Rivette as Emma, George Merritt as Mr. Utterson and Barrie Ingham as Sir Danvers. The production features Martin Van Treuren and Corinne Melancon, with Juan Betancur, David Chaney, Sheri Cowart, Bill E. Dietrich, John Treacy Egan, Robert Jensen, Peter Johl, Stuart Marland, Brandi Chavonne Massey, Frank Mastrone, Kelli O'Hara, Joel Robertson, John Schiappa, Bonnie Schon, Sally Ann Tumas and Russell B. Warfield.

Jekyll & Hyde debuted at Houston's Tony Award-winning Alley Theatre, breaking box-office records and playing to sold-out houses. A recording based upon this production was released and yielded the songs "Someone Like You" and "This is the Moment". Jekyll's success story gained momentum when stars such as Liza Minnelli and The Moody Blues started performing and recording songs from the show. Atlantic Records then recorded a new version of the complete score. Jekyll & Hyde yielded its third recording with the release of the original Broadway cast album, also on Atlantic Records. The three recordings have collectively sold more than 750,000 copies to date. The score from Jekyll & Hyde remains popular with recording artists, with Johnny Mathis featuring "Once Upon a Dream" on his album Mathis on Broadway.

Written by Leslie Bricusse (book & lyrics) and Frank Wildhorn (music), Jekyll & Hyde was directed for Broadway Worldwide by Emmy winner Don Roy King and was conceived for the stage by Stephen Cuden and Frank Wildhorn.

=== Memphis the Musical (2011) ===
Memphis was filmed during regularly scheduled performances January 18–21, 2011, by Broadway Worldwide for high-definition exhibition in digital cinemas in Spring 2011. The show was captured utilizing multiple high-definition cameras and 96 tracks of sound recording.

Emmy Award-winning director Don Roy King (Saturday Night Live, CBS' The Early Show, Survivor) and Grammy and Emmy Award-winning sound producer Matt Kaplowitz (Gandhi, PBS' To Bear Witness) lead the production team for Broadway Worldwide. The filmed production will screen nationwide on April 28–May 3, 2011.

The musical, about an interracial love affair in the 1950s segregated South, stars Tony Award nominees Chad Kimball and Montego Glover. Bon Jovi songwriter and band member David Bryan and Joe DiPietro penned the score to Memphis, which is flavored with gospel, R&B, rock and soul sounds.

Memphis earned Tony Awards for Best Book, Best Score and Best Musical. Kimball and Glover earned Tony Award nominations for their performances.
