= Don Roy King =

American television director (born 1947)

- Born: Donald Roy King; October 9, 1947 (age 78); Pitcairn, Pennsylvania, U.S.
- Education: Pennsylvania State University (BA)
- Occupation: Television director
- Spouse: Kate Snyder (m. 1995)

Donald Roy King (born October 9, 1947) is an American television director. He served as the director for Saturday Night Live from the year 2006 until 2021. He has "directed more hours of live network television than anyone else in the history of television," according to Michael Chein.

He has won a number of Emmys, among other awards.

== Early life ==
King is a native of Pitcairn, Pennsylvania. He grew up in both Monroeville and Pitcairn, and initially wanted to go into acting. His father worked as a mailman, with both his parents supporting his interests in sports and the arts. King was active as an athlete as a young student, and also directed classmates in small plays. He initially planned on attending West Point, with a medical exam later finding something wrong with his back and preventing him from applying. In eighth grade, he traveled with classmates to New York to see several Broadway musicals, with King developing a "crush" on New York City, aiming to eventually have a career there.

He attended Gateway High School, graduating in 1965, and Pennsylvania State University, graduating in 1969 with a degree in broadcasting. He graduated Penn State's Bellisario College of Communications. He initially studied for a degree in broadcast journalism, and also was involved with the school's theater department. He first directed a project during the last class of a broadcasting course, comparing it to playing quarterback on a football team. He also had an amateur boxing career.

== Career ==
=== Early career ===
Early in his career, King wanted to be an actor, and also became a director at a local station in Pittsburgh. He then became a director at several bigger stations in Pennsylvania. Aiming to eventually work in New York, he moved to a station in San Jose, then to a larger station in Pittsburgh, then moving on to direct at Channel 5 in New York. King directed morning news television for around two decades, first at ABC's Good Morning America and later CBS This Morning. His other directing work includes Survivor (including the live Survivor finales on CBS), The Early Show, and The Mike Douglas Show. King went on to be nominated for five Daytime Emmys for Outstanding Individual Direction For A Variety Show. He won in 1977 for The Mike Douglas Show, for the episode with Gene Kelly and Fred Astaire appearing together for the first time. At the age of 27 or 28, after already earning an Emmy for directing, he enrolled again in acting classes.

In 1991, he won an Emmy for Outstanding Individual Achievement in Graphic Design for his work on CBS Evening News with Dan Rather. At one point in his career, he was asked to be on a Blue Ribbon Panel for the Emmys, which he recollects gave him an understanding of how subjective it is to discern good directing. His assignments for various networks also took him to "20 countries and 38 states," with King working on productions and directing shows for "morning shows, documentaries, telethons, sporting events, concerts, and musicals." He also had experienced directing a number of sports broadcasts.'

King directed morning television for over twenty years, working on The Early Show, CBS This Morning, and Good Morning America, but by his late fifties, he desired a career change from the genre. Around that time, he was offered the chance to direct Saturday Night Live, which he said he did not expect, as he had no formal experience in directing sketch comedy.

=== Saturday Night Live ===
In 2006, the age of 58, King was hired as the director of Saturday Night Live, becoming the third person to serve as the show's director. He did not play a part in the creation or selection of sketches, but described his job as helping "bring them to life" instead. In 2016, he was the subject of an AARP video profile.

As of 2017, he was in his 11th season with SNL, and had won "six primetime Emmy awards, a daytime Emmy and three awards from the Directors Guild of America." That year, he won best directing for a variety series for an episode hosted by Jimmy Fallon.

He has been nominated for thirteen Directors Guild of America awards, which he won in 2014, 2016, 2017, 2018 and 2019.

In 2010, he consulted on the film Morning Glory, where "he ensured that the TV scene was depicted accurately," and also played Merv the Director. Between 2008 and 2018, he won an Emmy every year. By 2018, he had received nine Emmy Awards, eight Primetime and one Daytime, and five Directors Guild of America awards. In 2015 and 2016, he lost out to the Daily Show and Inside Amy Schumer. In 2018, he was nominated for Outstanding Directing for a Variety Series, again for SNL, winning. The next year, he won Outstanding Directing for a Variety Series again at the Primetime Emmy Awards. At that point he had 28 Emmy nominations. In 2018, he played himself in A Star Is Born.

He is the recipient of 10 Emmy awards and 19 nominations. His work on Saturday Night Live has earned him nine Primetime Emmys and 13 nominations. In January 2020, King won the Directors Guild of America Award for Variety/Talk/News/Sports - Regularly Scheduled Programming for Saturday Night Live. He retired from the show in 2021, during its 47th season.

=== Broadway Worldwide ===
He has spoken about the television industry at events and schools such as Lawrence Herbert School of Communication and Berkeley Forum. When not working on SNL and live version of Weekend Update in August, King is involved in various stage plays and musicals. Among projects he has worked on are Broadway version of Romeo and Juliet and Memphis. King is the creative director of Broadway Worldwide which brings theatrical events to theaters and television. The company has produced four major productions as of 2019, all of which King directed: Smokey Joe's Cafe, Putting It Together with Carol Burnett, Jekyll & Hyde, and Memphis. He also directed a big screen taping of Broadway's Romeo and Juliet with Orlando Bloom in 2013.

== Personal life ==
King lives in New York City, and has a daughter named Cameron. He married actress Kate Snyder in 1995 after a prior marriage ended in divorce.

== Filmography ==
Year	Title	Director	Producer	Actor	Notes
1977–1980	Kids Are People Too	Yes	No	No	TV series
1978	America Alive!	Yes	No	No	TV series
1977–1978	The Mike Douglas Show	Yes	No	No	TV series
1987	The Howard Stern Show	Yes	No	No	TV series, 5 Episodes
1998	Blockbuster Entertainment Awards	No	Yes	No	TV special
2000	Putting It Together: Direct from Broadway	Yes	No	No	TV movie
2001	Jekyll & Hyde: The Musical	Yes	No	No	TV movie
2001	Blockbuster Entertainment Awards	No	Yes	No	TV special
2002	Smokey Joe's Cafe: The Songs of Leiber and Stoller	Yes	No	No	TV special
2005	Naomi's New Morning	Yes	No	No	TV series
2006–2021	Saturday Night Live	Yes	No	No	TV series
2008	The Early Show	Yes	No	No	TV series, 1 Episode
2008	Saturday Night Live Presidential Bash '08	Yes	No	No	TV special
2008	Criss Angel Mindfreak	Yes	No	No	TV series, 1 Episode
2009	Saturday Night Live Just Commercials	Yes	No	No	TV movie, Segment Director
2009	SNL Presents: A Very Gilly Christmas	Yes	No	No	TV movie
2009	Saturday Night Live: The Best of Amy Poehler	Yes	No	No	TV special
2009	Saturday Night Live Sports Extra '09	Yes	No	No	
2010	The Women of SNL	Yes	No	No	TV movie
2010	Saturday Night Live Presents: Sports All-Stars	Yes	No	No	TV special
2010	Morning Glory	No	No	Yes	Merv (Director of Daybreak)
2011	SNL Christmas	Yes	No	No	TV special
2011	Survivor	Yes	No	No	TV series, 8 Episodes
2011	Memphis: The Musical	Yes	No	No	
2011	No Direction	No	No	Yes	"Dad"
2013	Saturday Night Live: Halloween	Yes	No	No	TV special
2013	Saturday Night Live: Thanksgiving	Yes	No	No	TV special
2013	Saturday Night Live: Christmas	Yes	No	No	TV special
2014	Saturday Night Live: Christmas Special	Yes	No	No	TV special
2014	Saturday Night Live: Thanksgiving Special	Yes	No	No	TV special
2014	Romeo and Juliet	Yes	No	No	Broadway Play
2014	SNL Sports Spectacular	Yes	No	No	TV movie
2014	Saturday Night Live: Best of This Season	Yes	No	No	TV special
2015	Hollywood Game Night	Yes	No	No	TV series, 1 Episode
2015	Saturday Night Live: 40th Anniversary Special	Yes	No	No	TV special
2015	An SNL Valentine	Yes	No	No	TV special
2015	SNL's NFL Saturday	Yes	No	No	TV movie
2016	A Saturday Night Live Christmas Special: 2016	Yes	No	No	TV movie
2016	Saturday Night Live: Thanksgiving Special	Yes	No	No	TV movie
2016	The 2016 SNL Election Special	Yes	No	No	TV movie
2016	Goodnight, Sweet Prince	Yes	No	No	TV special
2017	Saturday Night Live: Weekend Update Thursday	Yes	No	No	TV series, 11 Episodes
2017	The David S. Pumpkins Halloween Special	Yes	No	No	TV Short
2017	SNL Presents: Halloween	Yes	No	No	TV movie
2018	A Star Is Born	No	No	Yes	Himself (cameo)
2019	A Saturday Night Live Christmas Special	Yes	No	No	TV Short
2020	A Saturday Night Live Mother's Day	Yes	No	No	TV special
2020	Saturday Night Live Election Special 2020	Yes	No	No	TV special

== Awards and nominations ==
Year	Award	Category	Work	Result	Ref
1991	News & Documentary Emmy Award	Outstanding Individual Achievement in Graphic Design	CBS Evening News with Dan Rather	Won	
2007	Directors Guild of America Award	Outstanding Directorial Achievement in Musical Variety	Saturday Night Live ("Host: Alec Baldwin")	Nominated	
2007	Primetime Emmy Award	Outstanding Directing for a Variety, Music or Comedy Series	Saturday Night Live ("Host: Alec Baldwin")	Nominated	
2008	Primetime Emmy Award	Outstanding Directing for a Variety, Music or Comedy Series	Saturday Night Live ("Host: Tina Fey")	Nominated	
2009	Directors Guild of America Award	Outstanding Directorial Achievement in Musical Variety	Saturday Night Live ("Host: Justin Timberlake")	Nominated	
2009	Primetime Emmy Award	Outstanding Directing for a Variety, Music or Comedy Series	Saturday Night Live ("Host: Justin Timberlake")	Nominated	
2010	Directors Guild of America Award	Outstanding Directorial Achievement in Musical Variety	Saturday Night Live ("Host: Betty White")	Nominated	
2010	Primetime Emmy Award	Outstanding Directing for a Variety, Music or Comedy Series	Saturday Night Live ("Host: Betty White")	Won	
2011	Directors Guild of America Award	Outstanding Directorial Achievement in Musical Variety	Saturday Night Live ("Host: Justin Timberlake")	Nominated	
2011	Primetime Emmy Award	Outstanding Directing for a Variety, Music or Comedy Series	Saturday Night Live ("Host: Justin Timberlake")	Won	
2012	Directors Guild of America Award	Outstanding Directorial Achievement in Musical Variety	Saturday Night Live ("Host: Mick Jagger")	Nominated	
2012	Primetime Emmy Award	Outstanding Directing for a Variety, Music or Comedy Series	Saturday Night Live ("Host: Mick Jagger")	Won	
2013	Directors Guild of America Award	Outstanding Directorial Achievement in Musical Variety	Saturday Night Live ("Host: Justin Timberlake")	Won	
2013	Primetime Emmy Award	Outstanding Directing for a Variety, Music or Comedy Series	Saturday Night Live ("Host: Justin Timberlake")	Won	
2014	Directors Guild of America Award	Outstanding Directorial Achievement in Variety/Talk/News/Sports - Series	Saturday Night Live ("Host: Jim Carrey")	Nominated	
2014	Primetime Emmy Award	Outstanding Directing for a Variety Series	Saturday Night Live ("Host: Jimmy Fallon")	Won	
2015	Directors Guild of America Award	Outstanding Directorial Achievement in Variety/Talk/News/Sports - Series	Saturday Night Live ("Host: Tracy Morgan")	Nominated	
2015	Directors Guild of America Award	Outstanding Directorial Achievement in Variety/Talk/News/Sports - Special	Saturday Night Live 40th Anniversary Special	Won	
2015	Primetime Emmy Award	Outstanding Directing for a Variety Special	Saturday Night Live 40th Anniversary Special	Won	
2016	Primetime Emmy Award	Outstanding Directing for a Variety Series	Saturday Night Live ("Hosts: Tina Fey & Amy Poehler")	Nominated	
2016	Directors Guild of America Award	Outstanding Directorial Achievement in Variety/Talk/News/Sports - Series	Saturday Night Live ("Host: Dave Chappelle")	Nominated	
2017	Primetime Emmy Award	Outstanding Directing for a Variety Series	Saturday Night Live ("Host: Jimmy Fallon")	Won	
2017	Directors Guild of America Award	Outstanding Directorial Achievement in Variety/Talk/News/Sports - Series	Saturday Night Live ("Host: Jimmy Fallon")	Won	
2018	Primetime Emmy Award	Outstanding Directing for a Variety Series	Saturday Night Live ("Host: Donald Glover")	Won	
2019	Directors Guild of America Award	Outstanding Directorial Achievement in Variety/Talk/News/Sports - Series	Saturday Night Live ("Host: Adam Driver")	Won	
2019	Primetime Emmy Award	Outstanding Directing for a Variety Series	Saturday Night Live ("Host: Adam Sandler")	Won	
2020	Primetime Emmy Award	Outstanding Directing for a Variety Series	Saturday Night Live ("Host: Eddie Murphy")	Won	
2021	Primetime Emmy Award	Outstanding Directing for a Variety Series	Saturday Night Live ("Host: Dave Chappelle")	Won	
