= Memphis (musical) =

Musical

- Poster
- Music: David Bryan
- Lyrics: David Bryan; Joe DiPietro
- Book: Joe DiPietro
- Productions: 2002 Mountain View; 2009 Broadway; 2011 US tour; 2014 West End
- Awards: Tony Award for Best Musical; Tony Award for Best Original Score; Tony Award for Best Book of a Musical; Tony Award for Best Orchestrations

Memphis is a musical with music by David Bryan, lyrics by Bryan and Joe DiPietro, and a book by DiPietro.

The show is loosely based on the story of Memphis disc jockey Dewey Phillips, one of the first white DJs to play black music in the 1950s. It ran on Broadway from October 19, 2009, to August 5, 2012, winning four Tony Awards, including Best Musical. The show was staged at the Strand Theatre in Boston, Massachusetts during the 2018–2019 season, North Shore Music Theatre in Beverly, Massachusetts and TheatreWorks in Mountain View, California during the 2003–04 season, as well as the 5th Avenue Theatre in Seattle during the 2008–2009 season.

== Synopsis ==
=== Act 1 ===
There's a party at Delray's, an underground black Rock and Roll bar in 1950s Memphis ("Underground"). Huey Calhoun, a white man, arrives on the scene. The regulars begin to leave, but Huey convinces them to stay, claiming he is there for the music ("The Music of My Soul"). Later, Huey is about to be fired from his job as a stock boy at a local department store, but he makes a deal with the owner, if he can sell 5 records by playing them over the speakers, he can have a sales job. Huey plays a rock & roll hit ("Scratch My Itch"). He sells 29 records in five minutes, but the store owner fires him anyway, incensed at the type of music being played.

Huey returns to Delray's club, and begins flirting with Felicia, Delray's talented sister, and promises to get her on the radio ("Ain't Nothin' But a Kiss"). Huey then proceeds to apply for DJ jobs at various local white radio stations ("Hello My Name is Huey"). One of the owners, Mr. Simmons, invites him in, saying he'll show him what a 'real' DJ looks like. Huey hijacks the mic, and plays another African-American rock song ("Everybody Wants to be Black on Saturday Night").

Mr. Simmons is about to have Huey thrown out, but then dozens of teenagers start calling in demanding more of Huey and his music ("That's Not Possible"). Mr. Simmons agrees to give him a two-week trial, and if he's successful he'll get hired full-time. After a few days Huey is told to read an advertisement for beer, but he is illiterate. Huey asks Bobby, a friend of Delray's with a janitor position, to tell him what it says. He forgets the exact words almost immediately and begins to improvise, ending with the phrase "Hockadoo!".

Mr. Simmons again almost fires Huey, until the manager of the store advertised calls in saying that he wants Huey to do all of his advertisements, seeing as his stock sold out in minutes. Huey's station gains immediate popularity, as does his new catch phrase, even though no one understands what it means...including Huey.

While on the radio, Huey encourages white people to go down to black churches ("Make Me Stronger"), and they begin to. Meanwhile, Delray has saved enough money to put Felicia's voice on the record, and she travels to Huey's house to tell him this. He is overjoyed and promises to play it the next day. Huey's prejudiced mother, however, breaks the record, which leaves Felicia heartbroken, but Huey tells her to come down to the radio station anyway ("Colored Woman").

The next day, Huey brings in a band and back-up singers to play for Felicia live. Despite her reservations, Felicia sings and becomes an instant sensation ("Someday"). Felicia and Huey's relationship begins to grow, and Delray is becoming more and more infuriated with Huey. He warns him of the danger of what he is doing, threatening to harm Huey if anything happens to Felicia ("She's My Sister"). Huey's radio popularity grows more and more as white teens and black teens begin to accept each other ("Radio"). Huey and Felicia have been carrying on a secret relationship since the day she sang live on the radio.

Two years later Huey proposes to Felicia on the way to a party at Delray's. She says no because of laws and prejudice, but admits that without those obstacles she would accept. As the two share a kiss, a gang of white men pass by, spotting this. They hold Huey down as they beat Felicia with a bat. Huey manages to carry her into the club, crying out for help. Delray tries to go after Huey, for he promised to harm Huey should Felicia get hurt because of him, but Gator, a friend who has not spoken since he saw his father lynched as a child, calms him and sends out a prayer for change as Delray takes Felicia outside and gets her into the ambulance they called ("Say a Prayer").

=== Act 2 ===
Time has passed, and Huey is about to open his new TV show, a rock and roll variety show featuring all-black dancers ("Crazy Little Huey"). Felicia is supposed to be his first guest, but she backs out at the last minute, fearing that people will think she and Huey to be in a relationship. Huey informs Bobby that he will fill in, and after getting over some jitters, Bobby brings the house down ("Big Love"). Felicia's popularity is also beginning to grow around Memphis, as does her relationship with Huey.

Felicia tells Huey that if they went to New York they wouldn't have to sneak around all the time, but Huey insists that they are happy the way they are and don't need to leave ("Love Will Stand When All Else Falls"). She has been discovered by a talent agency in New York, as has Huey's TV show. The agency wants them both to come up to New York, although Huey has to compete with Dick Clark for the national show. They ponder the decision ("Stand Up"), and are even supported by Huey's mother, who has changed her racist ways after seeing a black church choir ("Change Don't Come Easy").

Huey is told he has won the TV position if he agrees not to use black dancers. Huey refuses and proceeds to strip out of his suit on the air ("Tear Down the House"). Felicia tells Huey that she plans to go anyway, as it is her dream. In a desperate attempt to keep her, he kisses her on the air, and says he loves her ("Love Will Stand/Ain't Nothin' But a Kiss" (Reprise)). The feed is cut, and Huey is fired on the grounds that no one would watch his show if they knew about him and Felicia, and that he wasn't the only white person to play black music anymore. Felicia is taken away by Delray in an attempt to save her career.

Now unemployed, Huey leaves the station and ponders his relationship with Memphis, realizing he couldn't leave for any reason ("Memphis Lives in Me"). Four years later, Huey is a DJ on an obviously low budget and low rated station (he jokes that they have "exactly one listener"). Felicia walks in, about to start a national tour. She tells Huey that she is engaged to a man named Bill, but that she wants him to join her on stage one last time. He refuses, afraid that no one will remember him. She begins her performance, and halfway through the song Huey walks on stage and finishes the song with her to thunderous applause. He then proclaims "The name is Huey Calhoun. Goodnight and HOCKADOO!" ("Steal Your Rock and Roll").

== Productions ==
=== Pre-Broadway (2003–2009) ===
The concept for Memphis was developed by theater producer George W. George. Following productions at the North Shore Music Theatre in Beverly, Massachusetts, and TheatreWorks in Mountain View, California, during their 2003–2004 season, the musical was staged by the La Jolla Playhouse in San Diego from August 19 through September 28, 2008 and the 5th Avenue Theatre in Seattle from January 27 through February 15, 2009.

=== Broadway (2009–2012) ===
Directed by Christopher Ashley and choreographed by Sergio Trujillo, the Broadway production began previews at the Shubert Theatre on September 23, 2009, and officially opened on October 19. The cast included many of the cast members from the pre-Broadway productions, including Chad Kimball as Huey Calhoun and Montego Glover as Felicia Farrell. The creative team included costume designer Paul Tazewell, scenic designer David Gallo, lighting designer Howell Binkley, and sound designer Ken Travis. The Broadway production won Best Musical in the Live Theatre division of the Golden Icon Awards, as well as four Tony Awards including Best Musical and four Drama Desk Awards.

The show closed on August 5, 2012, after 30 previews and 1,165 regular performances.

==== Theatrical release (2011) ====
The Broadway production was filmed during regularly scheduled performances January 18–21, 2011 by Broadway Worldwide for high definition exhibition in digital cinemas during spring 2011. The show was captured utilizing multiple high definition cameras and 96 tracks of sound recording. Director Don Roy King and sound producer Matt Kaplowitz led the production team for Broadway Worldwide. The filmed production was screened nationwide from April 28 through May 3, 2011.

=== First national US tour (2011–2013) ===
A national tour began at the Orpheum Theatre in Memphis, Tennessee, in October 2011. Bryan Fenkart starred as Huey Calhoun, and Felicia Boswell as Felicia Farrell. Other cast members include Quentin Earl Darrington, Rhett George, Will Mann, Julie Johnson, and William Parry.

=== First amateur production (2013) ===
The first amateur production was presented, with permission from the producers, as the All-State Musical production for the 2013 Illinois High School Theatre Festival, the largest festival of its kind in the United States. The entire cast, crew, and orchestra were all high school students from all over the state of Illinois, selected by audition through a rigorous and competitive process. Nathan Salstone, 2017 graduate of Carnegie Mellon University, performed the role of Huey, and De'jah Perkins was Felicia. The staff included Suzanne Aldridge (producer), J.R. Rose (director), Becky Dedecker (choreographer), Andrew M. Wallace (vocal director), Aaron Kaplan (orchestra conductor), and Lisa Gonwa (technical director). The production played from January 8–10, 2013 in the Tryon Festival Theatre at the Krannert Center for Performing Arts on the University of Illinois at Urbana-Champaign campus.

=== West End (2014–2015) ===
On 21 February 2014, it was confirmed that the show would open at the West End's Shaftesbury Theatre, on 23 October, following previews from 9 October 2014. Casting included Beverley Knight in the role of Felicia, and Killian Donnelly in the role of Huey. From 6 July 2015, X-Factor winner Matt Cardle replaced Killian Donnelly, who left to begin rehearsals for the West End transfer of Kinky Boots. Beverley Knight continued to 17 October 2015 as Felicia until she left to begin rehearsals for Cats the Musical. The role of Felicia was taken over by Rachel John for the final two weeks, until it closed on 31 October 2015 at the Shaftesbury Theatre, to make way for the West End transfer of Motown: The Musical.

=== Japanese production (2015) ===
Directed by Ed Sylvanus Iskandar and choreographed by Jeffrey Page, the Japanese production began at the Akasaka ACT Theater in Tokyo on January 30, 2015. Koji Yamamoto as Huey Calhoun, and Megumi Hamada as Felicia Farrell.

=== Australian production (2017) ===
The Australian premiere production played at Chapel Off Chapel in Melbourne from October 6 to 28, 2017. Produced by StageArt, directed by Dean Drieberg, musically directed by Nathan Firmin and choreographed by Kirra Sibel; starring James Elmer as Huey Calhoun and Elandrah Eramiha-Feo as Felicia Farrell. The production received many rave reviews and sold-out performances during its limited season.

=== German tour production (2022) ===
On May 6, 2022, the first German tour production opened in the Capitol Theater Offenbach. Produced by ShowSlot, directed by Carlotta Jarchow and Silvio Wey, choreographed by Timo Radünz, musically directed by Hans Tilmann Rose, with Kevin Thiel as Huey Calhoun and Sidonie Smith as Felicia Farrell.

=== South Korean production (2023) ===
The South Korean premiere opened in Seoul, South Korea on July 20, 2023, and ran until October 22, 2023, at Chungmu Arts Center. The show was directed by Tae Hyung Kim and musically directed by Joo In Yang. Kang-hyun Park, Chang Sub Lee, and Eunsung Ko alternated in the role of Huey Calhoun, while Lia Yoo, Seung Yeon Son, and Jeong Sun-ah alternated in the role of Felicia Farrell.

== Musical numbers ==
Act I

- Underground – Delray, Felicia and Company
- The Music of My Soul – Huey, Felicia and Company
- Scratch My Itch – Wailin' Joe and Company
- Ain't Nothin' But a Kiss – Felicia and Huey
- Hello, My Name is Huey – Huey and Company
- That's Not Possible – Huey and Company
- Everybody Wants to Be Black on a Saturday Night – Company
- Make Me Stronger – Huey, Mama, Felicia and Company
- Colored Woman – Felicia
- Someday – Felicia and Company
- She's My Sister – Delray and Huey
- Radio – Huey and Company
- Say a Prayer – Gator and Company

Act II

- Crazy Little Huey – Huey and Company
- Big Love – Bobby
- Love Will Stand When All Else Falls – Felicia and Company
- Stand Up – Delray, Felicia, Huey, Gator, Bobby and Company
- Change Don't Come Easy – Mama, Delray, Gator and Bobby
- Tear Down the House – Huey and Company
- Love Will Stand/Ain't Nothin' But a Kiss (Reprise) – Felicia and Huey
- Memphis Lives in Me – Huey and Company
- Steal Your Rock 'n' Roll – Huey, Felicia and Company

== Cast and characters ==
The original casts of notable productions of Memphis:

Character	Broadway	US tour	West End	German tour
Character	2009	2011	2014	2022
Huey Calhoun	Chad Kimball	Bryan Fenkart	Killian Donnelly	Kevin Thiel
Felicia Farrell	Montego Glover	Felicia Boswell	Beverley Knight	Sidonie Smith
Delray	J. Bernard Calloway	Quentin Earl Darrington	Rolan Bell	David E. Moore
Gator	Derrick Baskin	Rhett George	Tyrone Huntley	Oliver Edward
Bobby	James Monroe Iglehart	Will Mann	Jason Pennycooke	Richard McCowen Clark
Mama/Gladys	Cass Morgan	Julie Johnson	Claire Machin	Karina Schwarz
Mr. Simmons	Michael McGrath	William Parry	Mark Roper	Axel Becker

Notable Broadway replacements and understudies

- Sydney Morton worked in the original broadway cast as a swing performer, covering both white and Black roles.
- Nancy Opel replaced Cass Morgan as Mama on March 15, 2011.
- Adam Pascal replaced Chad Kimball as Huey Calhoun on October 25, 2011.
- Christopher Jackson temporarily replaced J. Bernard Calloway as Delray from January 22, 2012, to February 26, 2012.

== Critical reception ==
Memphis opened to mainly positive reviews. The New York Post's Elisabeth Vincentelli stated, "An exuberant musical with classic values: catchy songs, heaping spoonfuls of inspirational moments, and gifted performers at the top of their game." Michael Kuchwara of the Associated Press also praised the show, stating "The exhilarating new musical shaking the Shubert Theatre is the very essence of what a Broadway musical should be." Joe Dziemianowicz of the New York Daily News gave the show three and a half out of five stars and said, "It's nice to know a new musical can actually surprise you! Though it starts on a familiar note and sparks deja vu at other points, Memphis eventually finds its own voice and beat, and wins you over with its sheer enthusiasm and exuberant performances." John Simon of the Bloomberg News praised the show as well: "I guarantee you a rambunctious good time, highlighted by rousing music and singing, spectacular dancing, and a witty, moving story."

Despite these positive reviews, Memphis had its share of negative reviews. Although both Glover and Kimball received almost unanimous praise for their portrayals of Felicia and Huey, the show was criticized for its storyline. Charles Isherwood of The New York Times gave the show a lukewarm review, stating "This slick but formulaic entertainment, written by David Bryan and Joe DiPietro, barely generates enough heat to warp a vinyl record, despite the vigorous efforts of a hard charging cast." However he praised the performance of both leading performers. "Miss Glover, beautiful and poised, brings a spark of toughness to her role as Felicia. She acts with a focused clarity and sings with intensity."

== Awards and nominations ==
=== Original Broadway production ===
Year	Award Ceremony	Category	Nominee	Result	Ref
2010	Tony Award	Best Musical		Won	
2010	Tony Award	Best Book of a Musical	Joe DiPietro	Won	
2010	Tony Award	Best Original Score	David Bryan and Joe DiPietro	Won	
2010	Tony Award	Best Performance by a Leading Actor in a Musical	Chad Kimball	Nominated	
2010	Tony Award	Best Performance by a Leading Actress in a Musical	Montego Glover	Nominated	
2010	Tony Award	Best Direction of a Musical	Christopher Ashley	Nominated	
2010	Tony Award	Best Orchestrations	Daryl Waters and David Bryan	Won	
2010	Tony Award	Best Costume Design	Paul Tazewell	Nominated	
2010	Drama Desk Award	Outstanding Musical		Won	
2010	Drama Desk Award	Outstanding Book of a Musical	Joe DiPietro	Nominated	
2010	Drama Desk Award	Outstanding Actor in a Musical	Chad Kimball	Nominated	
2010	Drama Desk Award	Outstanding Actress in a Musical	Montego Glover	Won	
2010	Drama Desk Award	Outstanding Choreography	Sergio Trujillo	Nominated	
2010	Drama Desk Award	Outstanding Music	David Bryan	Won	
2010	Drama Desk Award	Outstanding Orchestrations	Daryl Waters and David Bryan	Won	

=== Original London production ===
Year	Award Ceremony	Category	Nominee	Result
2015	Laurence Olivier Award	Best New Musical		Nominated
2015	Laurence Olivier Award	Best Actor in a Musical	Killian Donnelly	Nominated
2015	Laurence Olivier Award	Best Actress in a Musical	Beverley Knight	Nominated
2015	Laurence Olivier Award	Best Actor in a Supporting Role in a Musical	Rolan Bell	Nominated
2015	Laurence Olivier Award	Best Actor in a Supporting Role in a Musical	Jason Pennycooke	Nominated
2015	Laurence Olivier Award	Best Theatre Choreographer	Sergio Trujillo	Won
2015	Laurence Olivier Award	Best Costume Design	Paul Tazewell	Nominated
2015	Laurence Olivier Award	Best Sound Design	Gareth Owen	Won
2015	Laurence Olivier Award	Outstanding Achievement in Music	David Bryan, Joe DiPietro, and Tim Sutton	Nominated

== Film adaptation ==
In 2012, it was revealed that Alcon Entertainment, Belle Pictures, and The Mark Gordon Company has planned a film adaptation of the stage musical.
