= Pershing Square Signature Center =

Off-Broadway theaters in Manhattan, New York

The Pershing Square Signature Center
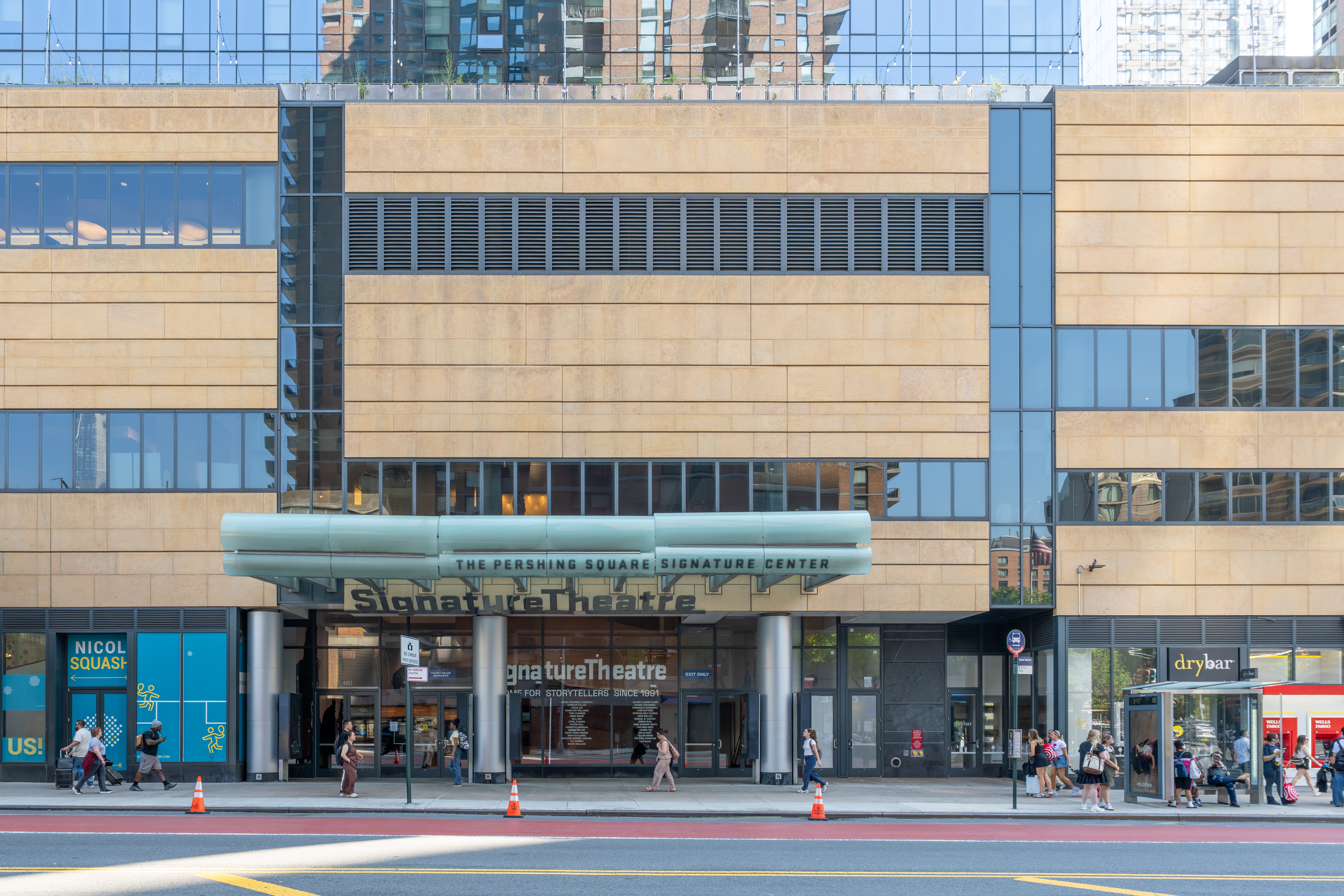
- Signature Theatre in 2026
- Interactive map of The Pershing Square Signature Center
- Address: 480 West 42nd Street; New York City; United States
- Coordinates: 40°45′32″N 73°59′42″W
- Owner: Signature Theatre Company
- Capacity: Irene Diamond Stage: 294; Romulus Linney Courtyard Theatre: 191; Alice Griffin Jewel Box Theatre:191
- Type: Off-Broadway

Construction
- Opened: 2012
- Architect: Frank Gehry Architects

Website
- www.signaturetheatre.org

The Pershing Square Signature Center is a complex of three Off-Broadway theatres in the Theatre Row section of West 42nd Street in New York City. It is on the first floors of the 43-floor MiMa Building apartment complex. Pershing Square Signature Center is the theatrical home and headquarters of Signature Theatre Company. The individual theaters are also available to rent and have hosted several notable productions. The New Group and Second Stage Theater frequently presents their work at the Pershing Square Signature Center.

The theatre derives its name from the Pershing Square Foundation, which donated $25 million to the theatre. The complex is more than a mile west of Manhattan's Pershing Square, which is also on 42nd Street.

In October 2008, Signature announced the building of the Pershing Square Signature Center. Designed by Frank Gehry Architects, the Center comprises the three theatres, two rehearsal studios, a café and bar, bookstore, and offices all on one level. It opened in 2012.

The Irene Diamond Stage has a seating capacity of 294 seats, the Alice Griffin Jewel Box Theatre has a seating capacity of 191 seats and the flexible Romulus Linney Courtyard Theatre has a capacity of 199 to 250, depending on the seating configuration.
