= List of musicals: M to Z =

This is a list of musicals, including Broadway musicals, West End musicals, and musicals that premiered in other places, as well as film musicals, whose titles fall into the M–Z alphabetic range. This is not a complete list of musicals, and is limited to musicals that have their own articles on the English-language Wikipedia.

See List of musicals: A to L for additional titles.

== M ==
M
Production	Year	Venue/type	Music	Lyrics	Book	Notes
Mack & Mabel	1974	Broadway	Jerry Herman	Herman	Michael Stewart	
The Mad Show	1966	Off-Broadway	Mary Rodgers	Various artists	Larry Siegel and Stan Hart	
Made in Dagenham	2014	West End	David Arnold	Richard Thomas	Richard Bean	Based on the film of the same name
The Madwoman of Central Park West	1979	Broadway	Various artists	Various artists	Arthur Laurents and Phyllis Newman	
Maggie May	1964	West End	Lionel Bart	Bart	Alun Owen	
The Magic Basket	1940	Australia	Alfred Wheeler	Bronnie Taylor	Bronnie Taylor	38 amateur productions
Magic Gum Tree	1934	Australia	Arline Sauer	Arline Sauer		26 amateur productions
The Magic Mrs. Piggle Wiggle	2001	Off-off-Broadway	Chad Henry	Henry	Henry	
The Magic of Lassie	1978	Film	Richard M. Sherman and Robert B. Sherman	Sherman and Sherman	Sherman, Sherman and Jean Holloway	
The Maid of the Mountains	1917	West End	Harold Fraser-Simson	Harry Graham	Frederick Lonsdale	
Make a Wish	1951	Broadway	Hugh Martin	Martin	Preston Sturges	
Make Me a Song	2007	Off-Broadway revue	William Finn	Finn	—N/a	
Making Tracks	1999	Off-Broadway	Woody Pak	Brian Yorkey	Welly Yang	
Mame + film (1974)	1966	Broadway	Jerry Herman	Herman	Jerome Lawrence and Robert E. Lee	Notable songs: "Mame", "We Need a Little Christmas" and "If He Walked Into My Life".
Mamma Mia! + film (2008)	1999	West End	Björn Ulvaeus and Benny Andersson	Ulvaeus, Andersson, and Stig Anderson	Catherine Johnson	Compiled from songs by ABBA. Notable songs: "Dancing Queen", "Does Your Mother Know", and "Mamma Mia".
Mamma Mia! Here We Go Again	2018	Film	Björn Ulvaeus and Benny Andersson	Ulvaeus, Andersson, and Stig Anderson	Ol Parker	Compiled from songs by ABBA. Sequel to the 2008 film Mamma Mia!.
Mam'zelle Champagne	1906	Broadway revue	Cassius Freeborn	Edgar Allan Woolf	Woolf	Noted for Harry K. Thaw murdering Stanford White during the opening night performance.
The Man from Snowy River: Arena Spectacular	2002	Australian	Bruce Rowland, Lee Kernaghan and Garth Porter	Kernaghan and Porter	David Atkins and Ignatius Jones	
Man of La Mancha	1965	Broadway	Mitch Leigh	Joe Darion	Dale Wasserman	Notable song: "The Impossible Dream".
A Man of No Importance	2002	Off-Broadway	Stephen Flaherty	Lynn Ahrens	Terrence McNally	Based on the 1994 Film of the same name.
The Man With a Load of Mischief	1966	Off-Broadway	John Clifton	Ben Tarver and Clifton	Tarver	
The Many Adventures of Winnie the Pooh	1977	Animated film	Richard M. Sherman, Robert B. Sherman and Buddy Baker	Sherman and Sherman	Various writers	
March of the Falsettos	1981	Off-Broadway	William Finn	Finn	Finn	It would later be half of Falsettos.
Margie	1946	Film	Alfred Newman	Newman	F. Hugh Herbert, Ruth McKenney and Richard Bransten	
Marguerite	2008	West End	Michel Legrand	Alain Boublil and Herbert Kretzmer	Claude-Michel Schönberg, Boublil and Jonathan Kent	
Marie Christine	1999	Broadway	Michael John LaChiusa	LaChiusa	LaChiusa	
Marinka	1945	Broadway	Emmerich Kálmán	George Marion, Jr.	Marion, Jr. and Karl Farkas	
Marry Me a Little	1981	Off-Broadway revue	Stephen Sondheim	Sondheim	—N/a	
Martin Guerre	1997	West End	Claude-Michel Schönberg	Alain Boublil and Stephen Clark	Schönberg and Boublil	
Mary Poppins + film (1964)	2004	West End	Richard M. Sherman, Robert B. Sherman and George Stiles	Sherman, Sherman and Anthony Drewe	Julian Fellowes	Based on the film of the same name. Notable songs: "Chim-Chim-Cheree" and "Supercalifragilisticexpialidocious".
Mary Poppins Returns	2018	Film	Marc Shaiman	Scott Wittman	David Magee	Sequel to the 1964 film Mary Poppins.
Matador	1987	West End	Mike Leander and Edward Seago	Leander and Seago	Peter Jukes	Notable song: "A Boy from Nowhere".
Matilda + film (2022)	2011	West End	Tim Minchin	Minchin	Dennis Kelly	Based on a children's novel (Matilda) by Roald Dahl. Had its Broadway premiere in 2013.
Maybe Happy Ending	2017	South Korea	Will Aronson	Hue Park		Directed by Kim Dong-yeon (director)
Maytime	1917	Broadway	Sigmund Romberg	Rida Johnson Young	Young	
Me and Juliet	1953	Broadway	Richard Rodgers	Oscar Hammerstein II	Hammerstein	
Me and My Dick	2009	University of Michigan	A.J. Holmes, Carlos Valdes and Darren Criss	Holmes, Valdes and Criss	Matt Lang, Nick Lang, Brian Holden and Eric Kahn Gale	Performed by StarKid Productions.
Me and My Girl	1937	West End	Noel Gay	Douglas Furber and L. Arthur Rose	Furber and Rose	Notable song: "The Lambeth Walk".
The Me Nobody Knows	1970	Broadway	Gary William Friedman	Will Holt	Robert H. Livingston, Herb Schapiro and Stephen M. Joseph	
Mean Girls + film (2024)	2017	Broadway	Jeff Richmond	Nell Benjamin	Tina Fey	Based on the 2004 film of the same name.
Meet Me in St. Louis + film (1944)	1989	Broadway	Hugh Martin and Ralph Blane	Martin and Blane	Hugh Wheeler	Based on the film of the same name. Notable song: "Have Yourself a Merry Little Christmas".
Meet Mister Future	2006	Off-Broadway	Scott Frankel	Michael Korie	Korie	
Meet the Feebles	1989	Film	Peter Dasent	Dasent	Various writers	
Mein Freund Bunbury	1964	German	Gerd Natschinski	Jürgen Degenhardt	Helmut Bez and Jürgen Degenhardt	based on Oscar Wilde's The Importance of Being Earnest
Memphis	2009	Broadway	David Bryan	Bryan and Joe DiPietro	DiPietro	
Menopause	2001	Off-off-Broadway	Various artists	Jeanie Linders	Linders	
Merlin	1983	Broadway	Elmer Bernstein	Don Black	Richard Levinson and William Link	
Merrily We Roll Along	1981	Broadway	Stephen Sondheim	Sondheim	George Furth	Notable songs: "Good Thing Going" and "Not a Day Goes By".
Metropolis	1989	West End	Joseph Brooks	Dusty Hughes and Brooks	Hughes	Based on the 1927 movie.
Mexican Hayride	1944	Broadway	Cole Porter	Porter	Herbert Fields and Dorothy Fields	
The Mighty Kong	1998	Film	Richard M. Sherman and Robert B. Sherman	Sherman and Sherman	William J. Keenan	Based on the 1933 movie King Kong.
Milk and Honey	1961	Broadway	Jerry Herman	Herman	Don Appell	
Millennials	2022	Off-West End	Elliot Clay	Elliot Clay	Elliot Clay	
Millennium Dome Show	2000	Millennium Dome	Peter Gabriel (issued as OVO)	Peter Gabriel	Peter Gabriel	Based on The Story of OVO
Million Dollar Quartet	2010	Broadway	Various artists	Various artists	Colin Escott and Floyd Mutrux	
Minimum Wage	2007	Off-Broadway	Sean Altman, Charlie LaGreca, Jeff LaGreca, Michael Gribbin, and Rob Utesch	Sean Altman, Charlie LaGreca, and Jeff LaGreca	Charlie LaGreca and Jeff LaGreca	Notable songs:"All These Dreams", "Kooky, The Happy Burger Clown" and "Minimum Wage Theme"
A Minister's Wife	2011	Off-Broadway	Joshua Schmidt	Jan Tranen	Austin Pendleton	Based on George Bernard Shaw's Candida.
Les Misérables	1980	French	Claude-Michel Schönberg	Alain Boublil and Jean-Marc Natel	Claude-Michel Schönberg and Alain Boublil	
Les Misérables	1985	West End	Claude-Michel Schönberg	Alain Boublil and Herbert Kretzmer	Schönberg, Boublil, Trevor Nunn, and John Caird	Notable songs: "I Dreamed a Dream", "On My Own" and "Do You Hear the People Sing?".
Les Misérables + film (2012)	1987	Broadway	Claude-Michel Schönberg	Alain Boublil and Herbert Kretzmer	Schönberg, Boublil, Trevor Nunn, and John Caird	
Miss 1917	1917	Broadway revue	Various artists	Various artists	Guy Bolton and P. G. Wodehouse	
Miss Liberty	1949	Broadway	Irving Berlin	Berlin	Robert E. Sherwood	
Miss Saigon	1989	West End	Claude-Michel Schönberg	Alain Boublil and Richard Maltby, Jr.	Schönberg and Boublil	Notable song: "Last Night of the World".
Miss You Like Hell	2018	Off-Broadway	Erin McKeown	McKeown and Quiara Alegría Hudes	Hudes	
MJ the Musical	2022	Broadway	Michael Jackson	Jackson	Lynn Nottage	
Moana	2016	Animated film	Lin-Manuel Miranda and Opetaia Foa'i	Miranda and Foa'i	Jared Bush	
Moana 2	2024	Animated film	Mark Mancina and Opetaia Foaʻi	Mark Mancina	Jared Bush and Dana Ledoux Miller	
Moby Dick	1992	West End	Robert Longden and Hereward Kaye	Longden and Kaye	Longden	
Moon Landing	2007	Off-off-Broadway	Stephen Edwards	Edwards	Edwards	
More Than You Deserve	1973	Off-Broadway	Jim Steinman	Steinman	Michael Weller	
The Most Happy Fella	1956	Broadway	Frank Loesser	Loesser	Loesser	Notable song: "Standin' on the Corner".
Motown	2013	Broadway	Various artists	Various artists	Berry Gordy	
Moulin Rouge! + film (2001)	2018	Broadway	Various artists	Various artists	John Logan	Based on the 2001 film of the same name.
Movin' Out	2002	Broadway	Billy Joel	Joel	Joel	
Mozart!	1999	Austrian	Sylvester Levay	Michael Kunze	Kunze	
Mozart, l'opéra rock	2009	French	Dove Attia, Jean-Pierre Pilot, Olivier Schultheis, William Rousseau, Nicolas Luciani, Rodrigue Janois and François Castello	Vincent Baguian and Patrice Guirao	Dove Attia and François Chouquet	Notable songs: "Tatoue-moi", "Vivre à en crever", "L'Assasymphonie", "Le bien qui fait mal", "J'accuse mon père" and "C'est bientôt la fin".
Mr. Cinders	1929	West End	Vivian Ellis and Richard Myers	Clifford Grey and Greatorex Newman	Grey and Newman	
Mr. President	1962	Broadway	Irving Berlin	Berlin	Howard Lindsay and Russel Crouse	
Mr. Saturday Night	2021	Broadway	Jason Robert Brown	Amanda Green	Billy CrystalLowell GanzBabaloo Mandel	
Mr. Wonderful	1956	Broadway	Jerry Bock, Larry Holofcener and George David Weiss	Bock, Holofcener and Weiss	Joseph Stein and Will Glickman	
Mrs. Doubtfire	2019	Broadway	Karey Kirkpatrick and Wayne Kirkpatrick	Karey Kirkpatrick and Wayne Kirkpatrick	Karey Kirkpatrick and John O'Farrell	Based on the 1993 film Mrs. Doubtfire
Mrs Henderson Presents	2015	West End	George Fenton and Simon Chamberlin	Don Black	Terry Johnson	Based on the film of the same name
Mrs. Patterson	1954	Broadway	James Shelton (songwriter)	Shelton	Charles Sebree and Greer Johnson	
Mrs. Santa Claus	1996	Film	Jerry Herman	Herman	Mark Saltzman	Choreography by Rob Marshall
Much Ado	1997	Off-West End	Bernard J. Taylor	Taylor	Taylor	
Mulan	1998	Film	Jerry Goldsmith and Matthew Wilder	Goldsmith and Wilder	Robert D. San Souci	
Mulan II	2004	Film	Joel McNeely	Joel McNeely	Michael Lucker, Chris Parker, and Roger S. H. Schulman	
The Muppet Christmas Carol	1992	Film	Paul Williams and Miles Goodman	Williams	Jerry Juhl	Muppet adaptation of Charles Dickens' A Christmas Carol
The Muppet Movie	1979	Film	Paul Williams and Kenny Ascher	Williams and Ascher	Jack Burns and Jerry Juhl	Notable song: "The Rainbow Connection"
Murder Ballad	2012	Off-Broadway	Juliana Nash	Nash and Julia Jordan	Jordan	
Murder for Two	2011	Off-Broadway	Joe Kinosian	Kellen Blair	Kinosian and Blair	
Muriel's Wedding	2017	Roslyn Packer Theatre, Sydney	Kate Miller-Heidke, Keir Nuttall, ABBA	Miller-Heidke, Nuttall, ABBA	P. J. Hogan	Based on the 1994 film of the same name
Music	2021	Film	Sia, Labrinth, Craig DeLeon	Sia		
The Music Man + film (1962) + film (2003)	1957	Broadway	Meredith Willson	Willson	Willson and Franklin Lacey	Notable song: "Seventy-Six Trombones".
Mutiny!	1985	West End	David Essex	Richard Crane	Crane	
My Brilliant Career	2024	Australian	Mathew Frank	Dean Bryant	Sheridan Harbridge and Dean Bryant	Based on the novel of the same name
My Fair Lady + film (1964)	1956	Broadway	Frederick Loewe	Alan Jay Lerner	Lerner	Notable songs: "I've Grown Accustomed to Her Face" and "I Could Have Danced All Night".
My Favorite Year	1992	Broadway	Stephen Flaherty	Lynn Ahrens	Joseph Dougherty	
My Life With Albertine	2003	Off-Broadway	Ricky Ian Gordon	Gordon and Richard Nelson	Nelson	
My Little Pony	2017	Film	Daniel Ingram	Ingram and Michael Vogel	G. M. Berrow	Based on the television series My Little Pony: Friendship Is Magic. Notable songs: "We Got This Together", "I'm The Friend You Need", "Time to Be Awesome", "One Small Thing", "Open Up Your Eyes" and "Rainbow".
My One and Only	1983	Broadway	George Gershwin	Ira Gershwin	Peter Stone and Timothy S. Mayer	A revised version of the Gershwins' 1927 musical Funny Face.
My Scary Girl	2008	South Korean	Will Aronson	Kyoung-Ae Kang	Kang	
My Son Pinocchio	2006	Kansas City	Stephen Schwartz	Stephen Schwartz	David Stern	A retelling of the classic tale of Pinocchio, told from the perspective of his maker and father Geppetto
The Mystery of Edwin Drood	1985	Broadway	Rupert Holmes			Notable song "The Writing on the Wall".
Mystic Pizza	2021	Regional	Various Artists	Various Artists	Sandy Rustin	Based on the 1988 film of the same name.

== N ==
N
Production	Year	Venue/type	Music	Lyrics	Book	Notes
Napoleon	2000	Canadian	Timothy Williams	Andrew Sabiston	Williams and Sabiston	
Narnia	1985	Off-off-Broadway	Thomas Tierney	Ted Drachman	Jules Tasca	
Natasha, Pierre & The Great Comet of 1812	2016	Broadway	Dave Malloy	Malloy	Malloy	Electropop opera, Based on Leo Tolstoy's War & Peace
Nativity!	2017	Birmingham	Debbie Isitt and Nicky Ager	Isitt	Isitt	Based on the 2009 film Nativity!
Ned Kelly	1970	Film	Shel Silverstein	Silverstein	Ian Jones and Tony Richardson	
Netru, Indru, Naalai	2006	Indian	A. R. Rahman	Rahman	Rahman	
Never Forget	2008	West End	Gary Barlow	Barlow	Guy Jones and Ed Curtis	
Never Gonna Dance	2003	Broadway	Jerome Kern	Various artists	Jeffrey Hatcher	Based on the 1936 RKO film Swing Time.
Nevermore: The Imaginary Life and Mysterious Death of Edgar Allan Poe	2009	Canadian	Jonathan Christenson	Jonathan Christenson	Jonathan Christenson	Staged Off-Broadway in 2015
A New Brain	1998	Off-Broadway	William Finn	Finn	Finn and James Lapine	
New Faces of 1952	1952	Broadway revue	Various artists	Various artists	—N/a	
New Girl in Town	1957	Broadway	Bob Merrill	Merrill	George Abbott	
The New Moon	1928	Broadway	Sigmund Romberg	Oscar Hammerstein II	Hammerstein, Frank Mandel, and Laurence Schwab	
New York, New York	2023	Broadway	John Kander	Fred Ebb with contributions from Lin-Manuel Miranda	David Thompson and Sharon Washington	Based on the musical movie of the same name directed by Martin Scorsese
Newsical	2004	Off-Broadway	Rick Crom	Crom	Crom	
Newsies + film (1992) + film (2017)	2012	Broadway	Alan Menken	Jack Feldman	Harvey Fierstein	Based on the film of the same name.
Next to Normal	2009	Broadway	Tom Kitt	Brian Yorkey	Yorkey	
Nice Work If You Can Get It	2012	Broadway	George Gershwin	Ira Gershwin	Joe DiPietro	
A Night with Janis Joplin	2013	Broadway	Janis Joplin	Joplin	Randy Johnson	Jukebox musical detailing the life and music of Janis Joplin.
The Nightmare Before Christmas	1993	Film	Danny Elfman	Elfman	Caroline Thompson and Michael McDowell	Notable songs: "What's This?", "This Is Halloween", and "Making Christmas".
Nine + film (2009)	1982	Broadway	Maury Yeston	Yeston	Arthur Kopit	
No, No, Nanette	1925	Broadway	Vincent Youmans	Irving Caesar and Otto Harbach	Harbach and Frank Mandel	Notable songs: "Tea for Two" and "I Want to Be Happy".
No Strings	1962	Broadway	Richard Rodgers	Rodgers	Samuel A. Taylor	
Nobody's Boy	1919	West End	Edward A. Horan	John P. Wilson	William Lestocq	
Nord-Ost	2001	Russian	Aleksei Ivaschenko and Georgii Vasilyev	Ivaschenko and Vasilyev	Veniamin Kaverin	
Nosferatu the Vampire	1994	Off-off-Broadway	Bernard J. Taylor	Taylor	Taylor	
The Notebook	2022	Broadway	Ingrid Michaelson	Michaelson	Bekah Brunstetter	Based on the 1996 novel of the same name, written by Nicholas Sparks.
Notre-Dame de Paris	1998	French	Riccardo Cocciante	Luc Plamondon	Plamondon	Notable songs: "Les temps des cathedrales", "Belle" and "Vivre".
Now. Here. This.	2012	Off-Broadway	Jeff Bowen	Bowen	Hunter Bell and Susan Blackwell	
Now Is the Time for All Good Men	1967	Off-Broadway	Nancy Ford	Gretchen Cryer	Cryer	
Nunsense	1985	Off-Broadway	Dan Goggin	Goggin	Goggin	
Nymph Errant	1933	West End	Cole Porter	Porter	Romney Brent	

== O ==
O
Production	Year	Venue/type	Music	Lyrics	Book	Notes
O Marry Me!	1961	Off-Broadway	Robert Kessler	Lola Pergament	Pergament	
O Pioneers!	2001	Off-Broadway	Mel Atkey	Atkey	Robert Sickinger	
O Say Can You See!	1962	Off-Broadway	Jack Holmes	Bill Conklin and Bob Miller	Conklin and Miller	
Octet	2019	Off-Broadway	Dave Malloy	Malloy	Malloy	
October Sky	2016	Regional	Michael Mahler	Mahler	Brian Hill and Aaron Thielen	Based on the 1999 film of the same name.
Of Thee I Sing	1931	Broadway	George Gershwin	Ira Gershwin	George S. Kaufman and Morrie Ryskind	Notable song: "Love is Sweeping the Country".
Of V We Sing	1942	Broadway revue	Various artists	Various artists	Sam Locke, Mel Tolkin and Al Geto	
The Office! A Musical Parody	2018	Off-Broadway	Assaf Gleizner	Bob and Tobly McSmith	Bob and Tobly McSmith	A musical parody of the television series The Office.
Oh, Boy!	1917	Broadway	Jerome Kern	Guy Bolton and P. G. Wodehouse	Bolton and Wodehouse	Notable song: "Till the Clouds Roll By".
Oh, Brother!	1981	Broadway	Michael Valenti	Donald Driver	Donald Driver	Based on The Comedy of Errors; ran for only three performances.
Oh! Calcutta!	1969	Off-Broadway revue	Peter Schickele, Robert Dennis, and Stanley Walden	Schickele, Dennis, and Walden	Various	
Oh, Captain!	1958	Broadway	Jay Livingston and Ray Evans	Livingston and Evans	Al Morgan and José Ferrer	
Oh, Kay!	1926	Broadway	George Gershwin	Ira Gershwin	Guy Bolton and P. G. Wodehouse	Notable song: "Someone to Watch Over Me".
Oh, Lady! Lady!!	1918	Broadway	Jerome Kern	P. G. Wodehouse	Guy Bolton and Wodehouse	Adapted for the 1920 silent film Oh, Lady, Lady
Oh, What a Lovely War! + film (1969)	1963	West End	Various artists	Various artists	Joan Littlewood and Theatre Workshop	
Oil City Symphony	1987	Off-Broadway	Various artists	Various artists	Mike Craver, Mark Hardwick, Debra Monk and Mary Murfitt	
Oklahoma! + film (1955)	1943	Broadway	Richard Rodgers	Oscar Hammerstein II	Hammerstein	Notable songs: "Oh, What a Beautiful Mornin'", "Oklahoma!" and "People Will Say We're in Love".
Olaf's Frozen Adventure	2017	Featurette	Elyssa Samsel and Kate Anderson	Samsel and Anderson	Jac Schaeffer	
Oliver! + film (1968)	1960	West End	Lionel Bart	Bart	Bart	Notable songs: "Consider Yourself", "Where is Love?", "As Long As He Needs Me" and "Food, Glorious Food".
Oliver & Company	1988	Film	J.A.C. Redford	Redford	Jim Cox, Tim Disney and James Mangold	
Olympus on My Mind	1986	Off-Broadway	Grant Sturiale	Barry Harman	Harman	
On a Clear Day You Can See Forever + film (1970)	1965	Broadway	Burton Lane	Alan Jay Lerner	Lerner	
On the Level	1966	West End	Ron Grainer	Grainer	Ronald Millar	
On the Record	2004	US Tour	Various artists	Various artists	—N/a	
On the Town + film (1949)	1944	Broadway	Leonard Bernstein	Betty Comden and Adolph Green	Comden and Green	Notable song: "New York, New York".
On the Twentieth Century	1978	Broadway	Cy Coleman	Betty Comden and Adolph Green	Comden and Green	
On Your Feet!	2015	Broadway	Emilio Estefan, Gloria Estefan, and Miami Sound Machine	Emilio Estefan and Gloria Estefan	Alexander Dinelaris	Jukebox musical based on the lives and music of Gloria and Emilio Estefan.
On Your Toes	1936	Broadway	Richard Rodgers	Lorenz Hart	Rodgers, Hart and George Abbott	
Once + film (2006)	2012	Broadway	Glen Hansard and Marketa Irglova	Hansard and Irglova	Enda Walsh	Notable song: "Falling Slowly".
Once on This Island	1990	Broadway	Stephen Flaherty	Lynn Ahrens	Ahrens	
Once Upon a Mattress	1959	Off-Broadway	Mary Rodgers	Marshall Barer	Jay Thompson, Barer and Dean Fuller	
Once Upon a One More Time	2021	Regional	Britney Spears & others	Britney Spears & others	Jon Hartmere	
Once Upon a Time at the Adelphi	2008	British	Elliot Davis and Phil Willmott	Davis and Willmott	Davis and Willmott	
One and One	1978	Off-Broadway	Dianne Adams and Richard O'Donnell.	Adams and O'Donnell	Fred Bennett and O'Donnell	
The One and Only, Genuine, Original Family Band	1968	Film	Richard M. Sherman and Robert B. Sherman	Sherman and Sherman	Lowell S. Hawley	
One Day	2026	Royal Lyceum	Johnnyswim	Johnnyswim	David Greig	
One Touch of Venus	1943	Broadway	Kurt Weill	Ogden Nash	S. J. Perelman and Nash	Notable song: "Speak Low".
Only Fools and Horses	2019	West End	Paul Whitehouse and Jim Sullivan	Whitehouse and Sullivan	Whitehouse and Sullivan	
Only the Lonely - The Roy Orbison Story	1995	Off-Broadway	Various artists	Various artists	—N/a	
Opening Night	2024	West End	Rufus Wainwright	Wainwright	Ivo van Hove	Based on the 1977 film of the same name by John Cassavetes.
Operation Mincemeat	2019	West End	David Cumming, Felix Hagan, Natasha Hodgson, and Zoë Roberts	Cumming, Hagan, Hodgson, and Roberts	Cumming, Hagan, Hodgson, and Roberts	
Ordinary Days	2009	Off-Broadway	Adam Gwon	Gwon	Gwon	
The Osmonds	2022	Touring	Various	Various	Julian Bigg, Shaun Kerrison and Jay Osmond (story)	
Our House	2002	West End	Madness	Madness	Tim Firth	
Our Miss Gibbs	1909	West End	Ivan Caryll and Lionel Monckton	Adrian Ross and Percy Greenbank	Cryptos and James T. Tanner	
Out of This World	1950	Broadway	Cole Porter	Porter	Dwight Taylor and Reginald Lawrence	
The Outsiders	2024	Broadway	Jonathan Clay and Zach Chance	Justin Levine	Adam Rapp	Based on the novel The Outsiders by S. E. Hinton, and on the 1983 film adaptation written by Kathleen Rowell and directed by Francis Ford Coppola.
Over Here!	1974	Broadway	Richard M. Sherman and Robert B. Sherman	Sherman and Sherman	Will Holt	

== P ==
P
Production	Year	Venue/type	Music	Lyrics	Book	Notes
Pacific 1860	1946	West End	Noël Coward	Coward	Coward	
Pacific Overtures	1976	Broadway	Stephen Sondheim	Sondheim	John Weidman	
Paddington: The Musical	2025	West End	Tom Fletcher	Fletcher	Jessica Swale	
Paint Your Wagon + film (1969)	1951	Broadway	Frederick Loewe	Alan Jay Lerner	Lerner	Notable song: "Wand'rin' Star".
The Pajama Game + film (1957)	1954	Broadway	Richard Adler and Jerry Ross	Adler and Ross	George Abbott and Richard Bissell	Notable songs: "Steam Heat" and "Hernando's Hideaway".
Pal Joey + film (1957)	1940	Broadway	Richard Rodgers	Lorenz Hart	John O'Hara	Notable song: "Bewitched, Bothered and Bewildered".
Panama Hattie	1940	Broadway	Cole Porter	Porter	Herbert Fields and B. G. DeSylva	
Parade	1998	Broadway	Jason Robert Brown	Brown	Alfred Uhry	
Paradise Square	2018	Broadway	Jason Howland	Masi Asare and Nathan Tysen	Christina AndersonLarry KirwanCraig Lucas	Hard Timesby Larry Kirwan
Paris	1928	Broadway	Cole Porter, Walter Kollo, and Louis Alter	Porter, E. Ray Goetz, and Roy Turk	Martin Brown	
Paris	2003	Australian	Jon English and David MacKay	English and MacKay	English and MacKay	
Passing Strange	2008	Broadway	Stew and Heidi Rodewald	Stew	Stew	
Passion	1994	Broadway	Stephen Sondheim	Sondheim	James Lapine	
The Passion Flower Hotel	1965	West End	John Barry	Trevor Peacock	Wolf Mankowitz	
Pennies from Heaven	1981	Film	Various artists	Various artists	Dennis Potter	
Perchance to Dream	1945	West End	Ivor Novello	Novello	Novello	
The Perfect City	2014	Off-off-West End	Martin Coslett	Ross Clark	Andrew Miller	
Perfect Harmony	2010	Off-Broadway	Various artists	Various artists	Andrew Grosso and The Essentials	
The Perils of Pauline	1947	Film	Robert Emmett Dolan	Dolan	P.J. Wolfson and Frank Butler	
Peter Pan	1950	Broadway	Leonard Bernstein	Bernstein	J. M. Barrie	
Peter Pan	1953	Animated film	Frank Churchill and Sammy Fain	Various artists	Various writers	
Peter Pan	1954	Broadway	Mark Charlap and Jule Styne	Betty Comden, Adolph Green, and Carolyn Leigh	J. M. Barrie	
Peter Pan	1996	Danish	George Stiles and Anthony Drewe	Stiles and Drewe	Willis Hall	
Pete's Dragon	1977	Animated film	Al Kasha and Joel Hirschhorn	Kasha and Hirschhorn	Malcolm Marmorstein	Notable song: "Candle on the Water".
Le Petit Prince	2002	French	Richard Cocciante	Cocciante	Cocciante	
Phantom	1991	Regional	Maury Yeston	Yeston	Arthur Kopit	
Phantom of the Opera	1976	West End	Ken Hill	Hill	Hill	
The Phantom of the Opera + film (2004)	1986	Broadway	Andrew Lloyd Webber	Charles Hart	Lloyd Webber and Richard Stilgoe	Notable songs: "The Phantom of the Opera" and "The Music of the Night".
The Phantom Tollbooth	1995	Off-Broadway	Arnold Black	Sheldon Harnick	Norton Juster and Harnick	
Phar Lap	2025	Australian	Steven Kramer	Kramer	Kramer	
Phi-Phi	1918	French	Henri Christiné	Albert Willemetz and Fabien Solar	Willemetz and Solar	
Pickwick	1963	West End	Cyril Ornadel	Leslie Bricusse	Wolf Mankowitz	
Pieces of Eight	1985	Off-West End	Jule Styne	Susan Birkenhead	Michael Stewart and Mark Bramble	
Pink Floyd – The Wall	1982	Film	Pink Floyd, Bob Ezrin and Michael Kamen	Floyd, Ezrin and Kamen	Roger Waters	
Pinocchio	1940	Animated film	Leigh Harline and Paul J. Smith	Harline and Smith	Various writers	Notable song: "When You Wish Upon a Star".
Pins and Needles	1937	Broadway revue	Harold Rome	Rome	Various writers	
Pipe Dream	1955	Broadway	Richard Rodgers	Oscar Hammerstein II	Hammerstein	
Pippin	1972	Broadway	Stephen Schwartz	Schwartz	Roger O. Hirson	
The Pirate Queen	2007	Broadway	Claude-Michel Schönberg	Alain Boublil and Richard Maltby, Jr.	Schönberg, Boublil and Maltby, Jr.	Notable song: "Woman".
The Pirates of Penzance	1879	Fifth Avenue Theatre	Arthur Sullivan	W.S. Gilbert		Notable song: "I am the very model of a modern Major-General".
Pitch Perfect	2012	Film	Christophe Beck and Mark Kilian	Beck and Kilian	Kay Cannon	
Pitch Perfect 2	2015	Film	Mark Mothersbaugh	Mothersbaugh	Kay Cannon	
Pitch Perfect 3	2017	Film	Christopher Lennertz	Lennertz	Kay Cannon and Mike White	
Plain and Fancy	1955	Broadway	Albert Hague	Arnold Horwitt	Joseph Stein and Will Glickman	
Platinum	1978	Broadway	Gary William Friedman	Will Holt	Holt and Bruce Vilanch	
Play On!	1997	Broadway	Duke Ellington	Various artists	Cheryl West	
La Plume de Ma Tante	1958	Broadway revue	Gérard Calvi	Ross Parker and Francis Blanche	Robert Dhéry	
Pocahontas	1995	Animated film	Alan Menken	Stephen Schwartz	Carl Binder, Susannah Grant and Philip LaZebnik	Notable song: "Colors of the Wind".
Pokémon Live!	2001	US Tour	Unknown	Unknown	Unknown	
Poor Little Rich Girl	1936	Film	Mack Gordon and Harry Revel	Gordon and Revel	Sam Hellman, Gladys Lehman and Harry Tugend	
Popeye	1980	Film	Harry Nilsson and Tom Pierson	Nilsson and Pierson	Jules Feiffer	
Porgy and Bess + film (1959)	1935	Broadway	George Gershwin	DuBose Heyward and Ira Gershwin	Heyward	Notable song: "Summertime".
Portofino	1958	Broadway	Louis Bellson and Will Irwin	Richard Ney and Sheldon Harnick	Ney	
Pretty Woman	2018	Broadway	Bryan Adams and Jim Vallance	Bryan Adams and Jim Vallance	Garry Marshall and J. F. Lawton	
Pride and Prejudice	1993	Off-off-Broadway	Bernard J. Taylor	Taylor	Taylor	
The Prince and the Pauper	2002	Off-Broadway	Neil Berg	Berg	Mark Twain	
Prince of Broadway	2015	Broadway revue	Jason Robert Brown	Brown	David Thompson	
The Prince of Egypt + film (1998)	2017	West End	Stephen Schwartz	Schwartz	Philip LaZebnik	
The Princess and the Frog	2009	Animated film	Randy Newman	Newman	Ron Clements, John Musker, and Rob Edwards	
Priscilla, Queen of the Desert	2006	Sydney Lyric	Various artists	Various artists	Stephan Elliott and Allan Scott	
Prodigal	2000	Off-Broadway	Dean Bryant and Mathew Frank	Bryant and Frank	Bryant and Frank	
The Producers + film (2005)	2001	Broadway	Mel Brooks	Brooks	Brooks and Thomas Meehan	Notable songs: "Springtime for Hitler", "I Wanna Be a Producer", and "Keep It Gay"
The Prom + film (2020)	2016	Broadway	Matthew Sklar	Chad Beguelin	Bob Martin and Chad Beguelin	
Promenade	1969	Off-Broadway	Al Carmines	María Irene Fornés	Fornés	
Promises, Promises	1968	Broadway	Burt Bacharach	Hal David	Neil Simon	Notable song: "I Say a Little Prayer".
Pump Boys and Dinettes	1982	Broadway	Various artists	Various artists	Various writers	
Purlie	1970	Broadway	Gary Geld	Peter Udell	Ossie Davis, Philip Rose and Udell	
Purple Rain	2027	Broadway	Prince	Prince	Peter Duchan	Based on the 1984 film of the same name
Puteri Gunung Ledang	2006	Malaysian	Dick Lee	Adlin Aman Ramlie	Saw Teong Hin, Zahim Albakri and Ramlie	

== Q ==
Q
Production	Year	Venue/type	Music	Lyrics	Book	Notes
Quadrophenia	1996	Off-Broadway	Pete Townshend	Townshend	Townshend	Notable song: "Love Reign O'er Me".
Queen O' Hearts	1922	Broadway	Lewis E. Gensler and Dudley Wilkinson	Oscar Hammerstein II	Hammerstein and Frank Mandel	
Queen of the Mist	2011	Off-Broadway	Michael John LaChiusa	LaChiusa	LaChiusa	
The Queen of Versailles	2025	Broadway	Stephen Schwartz	Schwartz	Lindsey Ferrentino	Based on the 2012 documentary of the same name
Quilters	1984	Broadway	Barbara Damashek	Damashek	Molly Newman and Damashek	

== R ==
R
Production	Year	Venue/type	Music	Lyrics	Book	Notes
The Race to Urga	1969	Workshop	Leonard Bernstein	Stephen Sondheim	John Guare	
Rachael Lily Rosenbloom (And Don't You Ever Forget It)	1973	Broadway	Paul Jabara	Jabara	Jabara and Tom Eyen	
Raggedy Ann	1986	Broadway	Joe Raposo	Raposo	William Gibson	Also known as Rag Dolly
Raggedy Ann & Andy	1977	Animated film	Joe Raposo	Raposo	Patricia Thackray and Max Wilk	Notable songs: "Rag Dolly", "No Girl's Toy", "Blue", and "Candy Hearts and Paper Flowers".
Rags	1986	Broadway	Charles Strouse	Stephen Schwartz	Joseph Stein	
Rags Parkland Sings the Songs of the Future	2010	Off-Broadway	Andrew R. Butler	Butler	Butler	
Ragtime	1998	Broadway	Stephen Flaherty	Lynn Ahrens	Terrence McNally	Notable songs: "Wheels of a Dream" and "Your Daddy's Son".
Rain: A Tribute to the Beatles	2010	Neil Simon Theatre	Founding members of the band Reign			Beatles tribute and theatrical production
Raise Your Voice	2004	Film	Aaron Zigman and Machine Head	Aaron Zigman and Machine Head	Mitch Rotter	
Raisin	1973	Broadway	Judd Woldin	Robert Brittan	Robert B. Nemiroff and Charlotte Zaltzberg	
Randy Newman's Faust	1995	Off-Broadway	Randy Newman	Newman	Newman	
Ratatouille the Musical	2021	Benefit concert	Various	Various	Michael Breslin and Patrick Foley	
Rebecca	2006	Austrian	Sylvester Levay	Michael Kunze	Kunze	
Red, Hot and Blue	1936	Broadway	Cole Porter	Porter	Howard Lindsay and Russel Crouse	Star vehicle for Ethel Merman and Jimmy Durante.
Red Pepper	1922	Broadway	Owen Murphy and Albert Gumble	Howard Rogers and Murphy	Edgar Smith and Emily Young	
The Red Shoes	1993	Broadway	Jule Styne	Marsha Norman and Bob Merrill	Norman	
Red, White and Maddox	1969	Broadway	Don Tucker	Tucker	Jay Broad and Tucker	
Redhead	1959	Broadway	Albert Hague	Dorothy Fields	Herbert Fields, Sidney Sheldon, David Shaw and Fields	
Redwood	2025	Broadway	Kate Diaz	Diaz and Tina Landau	Landau	Leading actress Idina Menzel was credited as co-conceiver with additional contributions to the material
Reefer Madness + film (2005)	2004	Off-Broadway	Dan Studney	Kevin Murphy	Murphy	
Rent + film (2005)	1996	Off-Broadway	Jonathan Larson	Larson	Larson	Notable songs: "Seasons of Love", "La Vie Bohème" and "Take Me or Leave Me".
Repo! The Genetic Opera	2008	Film	Terrance Zdunich and Darren Smith	Zdunich and Smith	Zdunich and Smith	Notable songs: "Zydrate Anatomy", "Mark it Up" and "Seventeen".
Return to the Forbidden Planet	1989	West End jukebox	Various artists	Various artists	Bob Carlton	
La Révolution Française	1973	French	Claude-Michel Schönberg and Raymond Jeannot	Alain Boublil and Jean-Max Rivière	Boublil and Rivière	
Revolution in the Elbow of Ragnar Agnarsson Furniture Painter	2014	Off-Broadway	Ívar Páll Jónsson	Jónsson	Jónsson	
Rex	1976	Broadway	Richard Rodgers	Sheldon Harnick	Sherman Yellen	
Ride the Cyclone	2008	Off-Broadway	Jacob Richmond and Brooke Maxwell	Jacob Richmond and Brooke Maxwell	Jacob Richmond and Brooke Maxwell	Notable song: "Noel's Lament".
The Rink	1984	Broadway	John Kander	Fred Ebb	Terrence McNally	
Riverwind	1962	Off-Broadway	John Jennings	Jennings	Jennings	
Road Show	2003	Off-Broadway	Stephen Sondheim	Sondheim	John Weidman	Retitled from Bounce
Road to Morocco	1942	Film	Jimmy Van Heusen	Johnny Burke	Frank Butler and Don Hartman	
Road to Singapore	1940	Film	James V. Monaco and Victor Schertzinger	Johnny Burke	Frank Butler, Don Hartman and Harry Hervey	
Road to Utopia	1945	Film	Jimmy Van Heusen	Johnny Burke	Melvin Frank and Norman Panama	
Road to Zanzibar	1941	Film	Jimmy Van Heusen and D. Costa	Johnny Burke and John Howard Payne	Sy Bartlett, Frank Butler and Don Hartman	
Roadside	2001	Off-Broadway	Harvey Schmidt	Tom Jones	Jones	
The Roar of the Greasepaint – The Smell of the Crowd	1965	UK Tour	Leslie Bricusse and Anthony Newley	Bricusse and Newley	Bricusse and Newley	
The Robber Bridegroom	1975	Broadway	Robert Waldman	Alfred Uhry	Uhry	
Robert and Elizabeth	1964	West End	Ron Grainer	Ronald Millar	Millar	
Roberta + film (1935)	1933	Broadway	Jerome Kern	Otto Harbach	Harbach	
Robinson Crusoe	1917	Australia	Herbert De Pinna and Bert Rache	Victor Prince	Daniel DeFoe	Vaudeville style comedy in which the title and concept are owed to the book author, but the content is sparsely related.
Rock 'n Roll Café	2012	Off-Broadway	Bernard J. Taylor	Taylor	Taylor	
Rock of Ages + film (2012)	2006	Broadway jukebox	Various artists	Various artists	Chris D'Arienzo	
Rockabye Hamlet	1974	Canadian	Cliff Jones	Jones	Jones	
Rockville	2009	Off-Broadway	Martin Gellner and Werner Stranka	Gellner, Stranka and Kim Duddy	Duddy	
Rocky	2014	Broadway	Stephen Flaherty	Lynn Ahrens	Thomas Meehan	Based on the film of the same name.
The Rocky Horror Show + film (1975)	1973	West End	Richard O'Brien	O'Brien	O'Brien	Notable songs: "The Time Warp" and "Sweet Transvestite".
Le Roi Soleil	2005	French	Various artists	Lionel Florence and Patrice Guirao	Kamel Ouali	
Roman Holiday	2001	Regional	Cole Porter	Porter	Paul Blake, Kathy Speer, and Terry Grossman	Based on the 1953 film of the same name.
Romance in Hard Times	1989	Off-Broadway	William Finn	Finn	Finn	
Romance/Romance	1988	Broadway	Keith Herrmann	Barry Harman	Harman	
Roméo et Juliette, de la Haine à l'Amour	2001	French	Gérard Presgurvic	Presgurvic	Presgurvic	Notable songs: "Les Rois du monde", "Aimer" and "On Dit Dans La Rue".
Rosalie + film (1937)	1928	Broadway	George Gershwin and Sigmund Romberg	Ira Gershwin and P.G. Wodehouse	William Anthony McGuire and Guy Bolton	Cole Porter composed an almost entirely new score for the film adaptation.
Rose-Marie	1924	Broadway	Rudolf Friml and Herbert Stothart	Otto Harbach and Oscar Hammerstein II	Harbach and Hammerstein	
The Rothschilds	1970	Broadway	Jerry Bock	Sheldon Harnick	Sherman Yellen	
Rover Dangerfield	1991	Film	David Newman	Newman	Rodney Dangerfield	
Royal Wedding	1951	Film	Burton Lane	Alan Jay Lerner	Lerner	
Rudolf	2009	Austrian	Frank Wildhorn	Jack Murphy and Nan Knighton	Murphy and Phoebe Hwang	
Rudolph the Red-Nosed Reindeer	1964	TV special	Johnny Marks	Johnny Marks	Marks	Notable songs: "There's Always Tomorrow", "Silver and Gold" and "A Holly Jolly Christmas"
A Runaway Girl	1898	West End	Ivan Caryll and Lionel Monckton	Aubrey Hopwood and Harry Greenbank	Seymour Hicks and Harry Nicholls	
Runaways	1978	Broadway	Elizabeth Swados	Swados	Swados	
Ruthless!	1992	Off-Broadway	Marvin Laird	Joel Paley	Joel Paley	Tina played by Laura Bell Brandy and u/s by Britney Spears and Natalie Portman

== S ==
S
Production	Year	Venue/type	Music	Lyrics	Book	Notes
Sadie Thompson	1944	Broadway	Vernon Duke	Howard Dietz	Dietz and Rouben Mamoulian	
Sail Away	1961	Broadway	Noël Coward	Coward	Coward	
Salad Days	1954	West End	Julian Slade	Slade and Dorothy Reynolds	Slade and Reynolds	
Sally	1925	Broadway	Jerome Kern	Clifford Grey	Guy Bolton	
Saludos Amigos	1942	Film	Charles Wolcott, Edward H. Plumb and Paul J. Smith	Wolcott, Plumb and Smith	Various writers	
Salvation	1969	Off-Broadway	Peter Link and C.C. Courtney	Link and Courtney	Link and Courtney	
San Francisco	1936	Film	Bronislaw Kaper and Walter Jurmann	Gus Kahn	Robert E. Hopkins and Anita Loos	
The Sap of Life	1961	Off-Broadway	David Shire	Richard Maltby, Jr.	Maltby, Jr.	
Sarafina!	1988	Broadway	Mbongeni Ngema	Ngema	Ngema	
Saratoga	1959	Broadway	Harold Arlen	Johnny Mercer	Morton DaCosta	
Saturday Night	2000	Off-Broadway	Stephen Sondheim	Stephen Sondheim	Julius J. Epstein and Philip G. Epstein	
Saturday Night Fever	2000	Broadway	Bee Gees	Bee Gees	Nan Knighton	
Saucy Jack and the Space Vixens	1995	West End	Jonathan Croose and Robin Forrest	Charlotte Mann and Michael Fidler	Mann and Fidler	
Saved	2008	Off-Broadway	Michael Friedman	Friedman	John Dempsey and Rinne Groff	
Say, Darling	1958	Broadway	Jule Styne	Betty Comden and Adolph Green	Abe Burrows, Marian Bissell and Richard Bissell	
Say It with Songs	1929	Film	Dave Dreyer and Billy Rose	Dreyer and Rose	Joseph Jackson, Darryl F. Zanuck and Harvey Gates	
Say When	1934	Broadway	Ray Henderson	Ted Koehler	Jack McGowan	
Scandalous	2012	Broadway	David Pomeranz and David Friedman	Kathie Lee Gifford	Gifford	
The Scarlet Pimpernel	1997	Broadway	Frank Wildhorn	Nan Knighton	Knighton	
Schmigadoon!	2026	Broadway	Cinco Paul	Paul	Paul	A stage adaptation of the Apple TV musical television series co-created by Paul
School of Rock	2015	Broadway	Andrew Lloyd Webber	Glenn Slater	Julian Fellowes	
Schwestern im Geiste	2014	Neuköllner Oper, Berlin	Thomas Zaufke	Peter Lund	Lund and Zaufke	
The Scottsboro Boys	2010	West End	John Kander	Fred Ebb	David Thompson	
Scrooge	1970	Film	Leslie Bricusse	Bricusse	Bricusse	A musical film adaptation of Charles Dickens' classic 1843 story, A Christmas Carol.
Second Chance	2009	French	Frédérick Desroches	Stéphane Prémont and Alexandre Martel	Prémont, Jean-Pierre Cloutier and Joëlle Bourdon	
The Secret Garden	1991	Broadway	Lucy Simon	Marsha Norman	Norman	
The Secret Life of Walter Mitty	1964	Off-Broadway	Leon Carr	Carr	Carr	
See Rock City & Other Destinations	2010	Off-Broadway	Brad Alexander	Adam Mathias	Mathias	
See What I Wanna See	2005	Off-Broadway	Michael John LaChiusa	LaChiusa	LaChiusa	
See You Later	1951	West End	Sandy Wilson	Wilson	Wilson	
Seesaw	1973	Broadway	Cy Coleman	Dorothy Fields	Michael Bennett	
Sergeant Brue	1904	West End	Liza Lehmann	J. Hickory Wood	Owen Hall	
Seussical	2000	Broadway	Stephen Flaherty	Lynn Ahrens	Flaherty and Ahrens	Based on the works of Dr. Seuss.
Seven Brides for Seven Brothers + film (1954)	1982	Broadway	Gene de Paul, Al Kasha and Joel Hirschhorn	Johnny Mercer, Kasha and Hirschhorn	Lawrence Kasha and David Landay	Based on the 1954 Stanley Donen film of the same name.
Sgt. Pepper's Lonely Hearts Club Band	1978	Film	The Beatles	The Beatles	Henry Edwards	
Shangri-La	1956	Broadway	Harry Warren	James Hilton, Jerome Lawrence and Robert E. Lee	Hilton, Lawrence and Lee	
Sharpay's Fabulous Adventure	2011	Film	George S. Clinton	Clinton	Robert Horn	Direct-to-DVD spin-off of High School Musical.
She Loves Me	1963	Broadway	Jerry Bock	Sheldon Harnick	Joe Masteroff	
Shenandoah	1975	Broadway	Gary Geld	Peter Udell	Udell, James Lee Barrett and Philip Rose	
Shinbone Alley	1957	Broadway	George Kleinsinger	Joe Darion	Darion and Mel Brooks	Also performed as archy & mehitabel.
Shock Treatment	1981	Film	Richard Hartley and Richard O'Brien	O'Brien	Jim Sharman and O'Brien	
Shockheaded Peter	1998	Off-West End	Adrian Huge, Martyn Jacques and Adrian Stout	Jacques	Julian Bleach, Anthony Cairns, Graeme Gilmour and Tamzin Griffin	
Shout! The Mod Musical	2006	Off-Broadway	Various artists	Various artists	Phillip George and David Lowenstein	
Show Boat	1927	Broadway	Jerome Kern	Oscar Hammerstein II and P. G. Wodehouse	Hammerstein II	Notable songs: "Ol' Man River", "Bill", "Can't Help Lovin' Dat Man".
Show Girl	1929	Broadway	George Gershwin	Ira Gershwin and Gus Kahn	William Anthony McGuire	
Showgirls! The Musical	2013	Off-Broadway	Bob and Tobly McSmith	Bob and Tobly McSmith	Bob and Tobly McSmith	A musical parody of the film Showgirls.
Showtune	2003	Off-Broadway revue	Jerry Herman	Herman	Paul Gilger	Premiered in San Francisco in 1985 as "Tune the Grand Up", with revivals in London in 1998 as "The Best of Times".
Shrek	2009	Broadway	Jeanine Tesori	David Lindsay-Abaire	Lindsay-Abaire	Notable songs: "Freak Flag" and "I Think I Got You Beat".
Shucked	2022	Broadway	Brandy Clark and Shane McAnally	Clark and McAnally	Robert Horn	
Side by Side by Sondheim	1976	West End revue	Stephen Sondheim, Leonard Bernstein, Mary Rodgers, Richard Rodgers and Jule Styne	Sondheim	—N/a	
Side Show	1997	Broadway	Henry Krieger	Bill Russell	Russell	
Silk Stockings + film (1957)	1955	Broadway	Cole Porter	Porter	George S. Kaufman, Leueen MacGrath and Abe Burrows	
Sing	1989	Film	Jay Gruska	Gruska and Dean Pitchford	Pitchford	
Sing	2016	Film	Joby Talbot	Various	—N/a	
Singfeld (A Musical About Nothing)	2023	Off-Broadway	Billy Recce	Bob McSmith, Tobly McSmith	The McSmiths	
Sing As We Go	1934	Film	Ernest Irving	Irving	Gordon Wellesley and J. B. Priestley	
Singin' in the Rain + film (1952)	1983	West End	Nacio Herb Brown	Arthur Freed	Betty Comden and Adolph Green	Adapted from the 1952 movie of the same name, the plot closely adheres to the original. Notable songs: "Singin' in the Rain" and "Make 'Em Laugh".
Sister Act	2009	West End	Alan Menken	Glenn Slater	Bill and Cheri Steinkellner	
Six	2017	West End	Toby Marlow and Lucy Moss	Marlow and Moss	Marlow and Moss	
Skittles Commercial	2019	The Town Hall (New York City)	Drew Gasparini	Nathaniel Lawlor	Lawlor and Will Eno	A live, one-night-only, staged musical commercial by Skittles that benefited Broadway Cares/Equity Fights AIDS.
Skyscraper	1965	Broadway	Jimmy Van Heusen	Sammy Cahn	Peter Stone	
Sleeping Beauty	1959	Animated film	George Bruns	Bruns	Erdman Penner	Notable song: "Once Upon a Dream".
The Slipper and the Rose	2001	Off-West End	Richard M. Sherman and Robert B. Sherman	Angela Morley	Morley	Retelling of the classic fairy tale of Cinderella.
Smash	2025	Broadway	Marc Shaiman	Shaiman and Scott Wittman	Rick Elice and Bob Martin	Based on the 2012-2013 NBC TV series of the same name
Smike	1973	Film	Roger Holman and Simon May	Holman and May	May and Clive Barnett	Adaptation of Nicholas Nickleby.
Smile	1986	Broadway	Marvin Hamlisch	Howard Ashman	Ashman	
Smiling the Boy Fell Dead	1961	Off-Broadway	David Baker	Sheldon Harnick	Ira Wallach	
Smoke on the Mountain	1988	Off-Broadway	Connie Ray	Ray	Ray	
Smokey Joe's Cafe	1995	Broadway revue	Jerry Leiber and Mike Stoller	Leiber and Stoller	—N/a	
Snoopy!	1975	Off-Broadway	Larry Grossman	Hal Hackady	Warren Lockhart, Arthur Whitelaw and Michael Grace	
Snoopy Come Home	1972	Film	Richard M. Sherman and Robert B. Sherman	Sherman and Sherman	Charles M. Schulz	
Snow White and the Seven Dwarfs + film (1937)	1969	Regional (The Muny and Radio City Music Hall)	Jay Blackton	Joe Cook	Cook	Based on the 1937 animated film of the same name.
Snow.Wolf.Lake	1997	Chinese	Guo Sai Cheung, Dick Lee, Iskandar Ismail and Lam Ming Yeung	Lam, Jang Keung, Albert Leung, Choo, Sin Man and Jacky Cheung	Cheung	
Soho Cinders	2011	British	George Stiles	Anthony Drewe	Drewe and Elliot Davis	
Some Like It Hot	2022	Shubert Theatre	Marc Shaiman	Scott Wittman	Matthew López and Amber Ruffin	Adapted from the 1959 film by Billy Wilder and I. A. L. Diamond
Someone Like You	1989	West End	Petula Clark	Dee Shipman	Robin Midgley and Fay Weldon	
Something Rotten!	2015	Broadway	Wayne Kirkpatrick and Karey Kirkpatrick	Wayne Kirkpatrick and Karey Kirkpatrick	Karey Kirkpatrick and John O'Farrell	
Sondheim on Sondheim	2010	Broadway revue	Stephen Sondheim and others	Sondheim	James Lapine	
Song and Dance	1982	West End	Andrew Lloyd Webber	Don Black and Richard Maltby, Jr.	Lloyd Webber	Notable songs: "Unexpected Song" and "Tell Me on a Sunday".
Song of Norway	1944	Broadway	Edvard Grieg	Robert Wright and George Forrest	Milton Lazarus and Homer Curran	
Songs for a New World	1995	Off-Broadway	Jason Robert Brown	Brown	Brown	
Sophisticated Ladies	1981	Broadway	Duke Ellington	Various artists	Donald McKayle	
Soul Men	2008	Film	Stanley Clarke	Clarke	Robert Ramsey and Matthew Stone	
Soul Sister	2012	West End	Various	Various	John Miller and Pete Brooks	Featuring the songs of Tina Turner
The Sound of Music + film (1965)	1959	Broadway	Richard Rodgers	Oscar Hammerstein II	Howard Lindsay and Russel Crouse	Notable songs: "Do-Re-Mi", "Climb Ev'ry Mountain", "The Sound of Music" and "My Favorite Things".
South Pacific + film (1958)	1949	Broadway	Richard Rodgers	Oscar Hammerstein II	Hammerstein II and Joshua Logan	Notable songs: "Bali Ha'i", "Some Enchanted Evening", "Younger Than Springtime" and "Happy Talk".
South Park: Bigger, Longer & Uncut	1999	Animated film	Trey Parker and Marc Shaiman	Parker and Shaiman	Parker, Matt Stone and Pam Brady	Notable songs: "Blame Canada", "Uncle Fucker", "It's Easy, Mmkay" and "Kyle's Mom is a Big, Fat, Bitch".
Soviet Zion	2015	London	Giles Howe and Katy Lipson	Howe	G. Howe and Roberto Trippini	Premiered at Jewish Museum London and transferred to The Lost Theatre (now Stockwell Playhouse, London). Concept album released 2021 with bonus album of selections in Yiddish.
Spamalot	2005	Broadway	John Du Prez, Eric Idle and Neil Innes	Idle	Idle	Notable songs: "Always Look on the Bright Side of Life" and "The Song That Goes Like This".
Spectacular!	2009	Film	Various artists	Various artists	Jim Kreig	
Spider-Man: Turn Off the Dark	2010	Broadway	Bono, The Edge	Bono, The Edge	Julie Taymor, Glen Berger, and Roberto Aguirre-Sacasa	
The Spitfire Grill	2001	Off-Broadway	James Valcq	Fred Alley	Valcq and Alley	
SpongeBob SquarePants	2016	Broadway	Various	Various	Kyle Jarrow	
Spring Awakening	2006	Broadway	Duncan Sheik	Steven Sater	Sater	Notables songs: "Mama Who Bore Me", "The Bitch of Living" and "The Song of Purple Summer".
St. Louis Woman	1946	Broadway	Harold Arlen	Johnny Mercer	Arna Bontemps and Countee Cullen	
Standing at the Sky's Edge	2019	West End	Richard Hawley	Hawley	Chris Bush	
A Star Is Born (1954), (1976), + (2018)	1954, 1976, 2018	Film	Various	Various	Various	All three films were based on the 1937 film of the same name.
Starlight Express	1984	West End	Andrew Lloyd Webber	Richard Stilgoe	Lloyd Webber and Stilgoe	Notable songs: "U.N.C.O.U.P.L.E.D.", "Starlight Express" and "Light at the End of the Tunnel".
Starmania	1976	French and Canadian	Michel Berger	Luc Plamondon	Plamondon	Notable songs: "Un garçon pas comme les autres" (English: "Ziggy"), "Le monde est stone" (English: "The World is Stone")
Starmites	1989	Broadway	Barry Keating	Keating	Stuart Ross and Keating	
Starship	2011	Off-off-Broadway	Darren Criss	Criss	Matt Lang, Nick Lang, Brian Holden and Joe Walker	Performed by StarKid Productions.
Starting Here, Starting Now	1976	Off-Broadway revue	David Shire	Richard Maltby, Jr.	—N/a	
State Fair + film (1945)	1996	Broadway	Richard Rodgers	Oscar Hammerstein II	Tom Briggs and Louis Mattioli	Based on the film of the same name. Notable songs: "It Might as Well Be Spring", "It's A Grand Night for Singing" and "Isn't It Kind of Fun?".
Steel Pier	1997	Broadway	John Kander	Fred Ebb	David Thompson	
Step Up: All In	2014	Las Vegas	Dolby Digital	Don Black and Christopher Hampton	Black and Hampton	
Stephen Ward	2013	West End	Andrew Lloyd Webber	Don Black and Christopher Hampton	Black and Hampton	
Stingray Sam	2009	Film	Cory McAbee	McAbee	McAbee	
Stop the World – I Want to Get Off	1961	West End	Leslie Bricusse and Anthony Newley	Bricusse and Newley	Bricusse and Newley	
The Story of My Life	2009	Broadway	Neil Bartram	Neil Bartram	Brian Hill	
A Strange Loop	2019	Off-Broadway	Michael R. Jackson			
Street Scene	1947	Broadway	Kurt Weill	Elmer Rice	Elmer Rice	
Strider (musical)	1979	Broadway	Norman L. Berman	Steven Brown (lyricist)	Mark Rozovsky	
Strike Up the Band	1930	Broadway	George Gershwin	Ira Gershwin	Morrie Ryskind	Notable song: "Strike Up the Band".
The Stripper	1982	Australian	Richard Hartley	Richard O'Brien	Carter Brown	
The Student Prince	1924	Broadway	Sigmund Romberg	Dorothy Donnelly	Donnelly	Longest-running musical of the 1920s, until Show Boat.
Subways Are For Sleeping	1961	Broadway	Jule Styne	Betty Comden and Adolph Green	Comden and Green	
Suffs	2022	Off-Broadway	Shaina Taub	Shaina Taub	Shaina Taub	
Sugar	1972	Broadway	Jule Styne	Bob Merrill	Peter Stone	
Sugar Babies	1979	Broadway revue	Jimmy McHugh	Dorothy Fields and Al Dubin	—N/a	
Summer: The Donna Summer Musical	2017	Broadway	Donna Summer, Giorgio Moroder, Pete Bellotte, Paul Jabara, and others	Summer, Moroder, Bellotte, Jabara, and others	Colman Domingo, Robert Cary, and Des McAnuff	
Sunday in the Park with George	1984	Broadway	Stephen Sondheim	Sondheim	James Lapine	Notable songs: "Sunday in the Park with George", "Everybody Loves Louis" and "Finishing the Hat".
Sunny Afternoon	2014	West End	Ray Davies	Davies	Joe Penhall	Winner of 2015 Laurence Olivier Award for Best New Musical
Sunset Boulevard	1993	West End	Andrew Lloyd Webber	Don Black and Christopher Hampton	Black and Hampton	Notable songs: "Sunset Boulevard", "With One Look" and "As If We Never Said Goodbye".
Sunshine on Leith + film (2013)	2007	Dundee Rep	Craig Reid and Charlie Reid	Reid & Reid	Stephen Greenhorn	Compiled by songs from The Proclaimers. Notable Songs: "Letter from America", "I'm On My Way" and "I'm Gonna Be (500 Miles)"
Sweeney Todd: The Demon Barber of Fleet Street + film (2007)	1979	Broadway	Stephen Sondheim	Sondheim	Hugh Wheeler	Notable songs: "The Worst Pies in London", "Green Finch and Linnet Bird", "Johanna" and "No Place Like London".
Sweet Charity + film (1969)	1966	Broadway	Cy Coleman	Dorothy Fields	Neil Simon	Notable songs: "Big Spender", "If My Friends Could See Me Now" and "The Rhythm of Life".
Sweet Smell of Success	2002	Broadway	Marvin Hamlisch	Craig Carnelia	John Guare	
Swept Away	2024	Broadway	The Avett Brothers	The Avett Brothers	John Logan	
Swing!	1999	Broadway revue	Various artists	Various artists	—N/a	
The Swing Mikado	1938	Broadway	Gentry Warden and Arthur Sullivan	W. S. Gilbert	Harry Minturn	Based on Gilbert and Sullivan's comic opera, The Mikado.
Swing Time	1936	Film	George Gershwin	Ira Gershwin	Howard Lindsay and Allan Scott	
Swinging on a Star	1995	Broadway revue	Johnny Burke	Burke	Michael Leeds	
The Sword in the Stone	1963	Film	Richard M. Sherman and Robert B. Sherman	Sherman and Sherman	Bill Peet	

== T ==
T
Production	Year	Venue/type	Music	Lyrics	Book	Notes
Taboo	2003	West End	Boy George, Kevan Frost, John Themis and Richie Stevens	George	Mark Davies Markham and Charles Busch	
Take Flight!	2007	West End	David Shire	Richard Maltby, Jr.	John Weidman	
Take Me Along	1959	Broadway	Bob Merrill	Merrill	Joseph Stein and Robert Russell	
Taking My Turn	1983	Off-Broadway	Gary William Friedman	Will Holt	Elise Brosnan	
A Tale of Two Cities	2008	Broadway	Jill Santoriello	Santoriello	Santoriello	
Tältprojektet	1977	Swedish	Ulf Dageby	Dageby	Dageby	
Tammy Faye	2022	Broadway	Elton John	Jake Shears	James Graham	
Tangled	2010	Film	Alan Menken	Glenn Slater	Dan Fogelman	Starred Mandy Moore, Zachary Levi and Donna Murphy.
Tango Argentino	1985	Broadway revue	Various artists	Various artists	—N/a	
The Tap Dance Kid	1983	Broadway	Henry Krieger	Robert Lorick	Charles Blackwell	
Tarzan	2006	Broadway	Phil Collins	Collins	David Henry Hwang	
Teacher's Pet	2004	Film	Stephen James Taylor	Taylor	Bill Steinkellner and Cheri Steinkellner	
Teeth	2024	Off-Broadway	Anna K. Jacobs	Michael R. Jackson	Anna K. Jacobs and Micahel R. Jackson	Based on 2007 film of the same name
The Ten Commandments	2004	Off-off-Broadway	Patrick Leonard	Maribeth Derry	Élie Chouraqui	
Tenacious D in The Pick of Destiny	2006	Film	Tenacious D	Tenacious D	Jack Black, Kyle Gass and Liam Lynch	
Tenderloin	1960	Broadway	Jerry Bock	Sheldon Harnick	George Abbott and Jerome Weidman	
Texas Li'l Darlin'	1949	Broadway	Robert Emmett Dolan	Johnny Mercer	John Whedon and Sam Moore	
That Bloody Woman	2015	New Zealand	Luke Di Somma	Luke Di Somma	Gregory Cooper	
That Midnight Kiss	1949	Film	Charles Previn	Conrad Salinger	Bruce Manning and Tamara Hovey	
They're Playing Our Song	1979	Broadway	Marvin Hamlisch	Carole Bayer Sager	Neil Simon	
The Thing About Men	2003	Off-Broadway	Jimmy Roberts	Joe DiPietro	DiPietro	
Thoroughly Modern Millie + film (1967)	2002	Broadway	Jeanine Tesori	Dick Scanlan	Richard Morris and Scanlan	Based on the film of the same name. Notable songs: "Thoroughly Modern Millie" and "Forget About the Boy".
Thou Shalt Not	2001	Broadway	Harry Connick, Jr.	Connick, Jr.	David Thompson	
The Three Caballeros	1945	Film	Edward H. Plumb, Paul J. Smith and Charles Wolcott	Plumb, Smith and Wolcott	Various writers	Notable songs: "The Three Caballeros" and "You Belong to My Heart".
The Three Musketeers	1928	Broadway	Rudolf Friml	Clifford Grey and P. G. Wodehouse	William Anthony McGuire	
Three Postcards	1987	Off-Broadway	Craig Carnelia	Carnelia	Craig Lucas	
Three Wishes for Jamie	1952	Broadway	Ralph Blane	Blane	Charles O'Neal and Abe Burrows	
The Threepenny Opera	1928	German	Kurt Weill	Bertolt Brecht	Brecht	Notable songs: "Mack the Knife" and "Pirate Jenny".
Tick, Tick... Boom! + film (2021)	2001	Off-Broadway	Jonathan Larson	Larson	Larson and David Auburn	
Tickets, Please!	1950	Broadway revue	Various artists	Various artists	—N/a	
Tickle Me	1920	Broadway	Herbert Stothart	Oscar Hammerstein II, Otto Harbach and Frank Mandel	Hammerstein, Harbach and Mandel	
The Tigger Movie	2000	Film	Richard M. Sherman and Robert B. Sherman	Sherman and Sherman	Jun Falkenstein	
Timbuktu!	1978	Broadway	George Forrest and Robert Wright	Forrest and Wright	Luther Davis	
Tina	2018	West End	Various artists	Various artists	Katori Hall, Frank Ketelaar, Kees Prins	Jukebox musical depicting the life and career of Tina Turner.
Tintypes	1980	Broadway revue	Various artists	Various artists	Mel Marvin and Gary Pearle	
Titanic	1997	Broadway	Maury Yeston	Yeston	Peter Stone	
Titanique	2017	Off-Broadway	Various	Various	Tye Blue, Marla Mindell, and Constantine Rousouli	
title of show	2008	Broadway	Jeff Bowen	Bowen	Hunter Bell	
Tom Sawyer	1973	Film	Robert B. Sherman and Richard M. Sherman	Sherman and Sherman	Sherman and Sherman	
Tons of Money	1924	Musical	Vaiben Louis and Willy Redstone	Hugh Ward	Hugh Ward	
Tomorrow Morning	2008	West End	Laurence Mark Wythe	Wythe	Wythe	
Tonight's the Night	2003	West End jukebox	Rod Stewart	Stewart	Ben Elton	
Too Close to the Sun	2009	West End	John Robinson	Robinson and Roberto Trippini	Trippini	
Too Many Girls	1939	Broadway	Richard Rodgers	Lorenz Hart	George Marion, Jr.	
Tootsie	2018	Broadway	David Yazbek	Yazbek	Robert Horn	Based on the 1982 film of the same name.
Top Banana	1951	Broadway	Johnny Mercer	Mercer	Hy Kraft	
Top Hat + film (1935)	2011	West End	Irving Berlin	Berlin	Matthew White and Howard Jacques	Based on the film of the same name. Notable song: "Cheek to Cheek".
Tovarich	1963	Broadway	Lee Pockriss	Anne Croswell	David Shaw	
The Toxic Avenger	2008	Off-Broadway	David Bryan	Joe DiPietro and Bryan	DiPietro	
The Trail To Oregon!	2014	Off-Broadway	Jeff Blim	Blim	Jeff Blim, Matt Lang, and Nick Lang	Parody of the game series, The Oregon Trail.
A Tree Grows in Brooklyn	1951	Broadway	Arthur Schwartz	Dorothy Fields	George Abbott and Betty Smith	
Trial by Jury	1875	London's Royalty Theatre	Arthur Sullivan	W.S. Gilbert	W.S. Gilbert	
Triassic Parq	2010	Off-Broadway	Marshall Pailet	Marshall Pailet, Bryce Norbitz, and Steve Wargo	Marshall Pailet, Bryce Norbitz, and Steve Wargo	The film Jurassic Park from the perspective of the dinosaurs.
Triumph of Love	1997	Broadway	Jeffrey Stock	Susan Birkenhead	James Magruder	
Tuck Everlasting	2016	Broadway	Chris Miller	Nathan Tysen	Claudia Shear and Tim Federle	Based upon the book of the same name by Natalie Babbitt
Turkish Delight the Opera	2006	Off-West End	Giles Howe and Katy Lipson	Howe	Howe	Four full productions on the London Fringe made this show a cult hit and one concert of selections from the show was presented as part of the 2007 Stockholm Pride festival.
Twang!!	1965	West End	Lionel Bart	Lionel Bart		
Twisted	2013	Off-off-Broadway	A.J. Holmes	Kaley McMahon	Matt Lang, Nick Lang, and Eric Kahn Gale	Parody of the Walt Disney Animation Studios' film Aladdin.
Two by Two	1970	Broadway	Richard Rodgers	Martin Charnin	Peter Stone	
Two Cities	2006	Off-Broadway	Howard Goodall	Goodall	Goodall and Joanna Read	
Two Gentlemen of Verona	1971	Broadway	Galt MacDermot	John Guare and Mel Shapiro	Guare and Shapiro	
Two on the Aisle	1951	Broadway revue	Jule Styne	Betty Comden and Adolph Green	Comden and Green	
Two Strangers (Carry a Cake Across New York)	2025	Broadway	Jim Barne	Kit Buchan	Buchan	
Two's Company	1952	Broadway revue	Vernon Duke	Ogden Nash and Sammy Cahn	Charles Sherman and Peter DeVries	

== U ==
U
Production	Year	Venue/type	Music	Lyrics	Book	Notes
The Umbrellas of Cherbourg	1964	Film	Michel Legrand	Legrand	Jacques Demy	
Urban Cowboy	2003	Broadway	Jason Robert Brown and Jeff Blumenkrantz	Robert Brown and Blumenkrantz	Aaron Latham and Phillip Oesterman	
Urinetown	2001	Broadway	Mark Hollmann	Hollman and Greg Kotis	Kotis	
USHERS: The Front of House Musical	2013	Off West End	Yiannis Koutsakos	James Oban	James Rottger	
The Utter Glory of Morrissey Hall	1979	Broadway	Clark Gesner	Gesner	Gesner and Nagle Jackson	

== V ==
V
Production	Year	Venue/type	Music	Lyrics	Book	Notes
Vanities	2006	Off-Broadway	David Kirshenbaum	Kirshenbaum	Jack Heifner	Based on the 1976 play of the same name.
Very Good, Eddie	1915	Broadway	Jerome Kern	Schuyler Green and Herbert Reynolds	Philip Bartholomae and Guy Bolton	
A Very Merry Unauthorized Children's Scientology Pageant	2003	Off-off-Broadway	Kyle Jarrow	Jarrow	Jarrow	
A Very Potter Musical	2009	University of Michigan	Darren Criss and A.J. Holmes	Criss and Holmes	Matt Lang, Nick Lang, and Brian Holden	Parody musical based on the Harry Potter film series by J. K. Rowling
A Very Potter Senior Year	2012	Off-off-Broadway	A.J. Holmes, Clark Baxtresser, Pierce Siebers and Darren Criss	Holmes, Baxtresser, Siebers and Criss	Matt Lang, Nick Lang and Brian Holden	Performed by StarKid Productions.
A Very Potter Sequel	2010	Off-off-Broadway	Darren Criss	Criss	Matt Lang, Nick Lang and Brian Holden	Performed by StarKid Productions.
Very Warm for May	1939	Broadway	Jerome Kern	Oscar Hammerstein II	Hammerstein II	Notable song: "All the Things You Are".
Via Galactica	1972	Broadway	Galt MacDermot	Christopher Gore	Gore and Judith Ross	
Victor/Victoria + film (1982)	1995	Broadway	Henry Mancini and Frank Wildhorn	Leslie Bricusse and Wildhorn	Blake Edwards	Adapted from the 1982 film.
Violet	2014	Broadway	Jeanine Tesori	Brian Crawley	Crawley	
The Visit	2001	Broadway	John Kander	Fred Ebb	Terrence McNally	Debuted on Broadway in 2015.
Viva Forever!	2012	West End	The Spice Girls		Jennifer Saunders	
Vivir Intentando	2003	Film	Fernando López Rossi and Diego Grimblat	López Rossi and Grimblat	Carolina Hughes, Alejandro Sapognikoff and Tomás Yankelevich	

== W ==
W
Production	Year	Venue/type	Music	Lyrics	Book	Notes
Wait a Minim!	1964	West End revue	Jeremy Taylor	Taylor	Leon Gluckman	
Waitress	2015	Broadway	Sara Bareilles	Sara Bareilles	Jessie Nelson	Based on the 2007 film of the same name.
Walk a Little Faster	1932	Broadway revue	Vernon Duke	E. Y. Harburg	S. J. Perelman and Robert MacGunigle	
Walking Happy	1966	Broadway	Jimmy Van Heusen	Sammy Cahn	Roger O. Hirson and Ketti Frings	
Walmartopia	2005	Off-Broadway	Andrew Rohn	Rohn	Catherine Capellaro	
Wanted	2024, 2026	Broadway	Ross Baum	Angelica Chéri	Chéri	
War Paint	2017	Broadway	Scott Frankel	Michael Korie	Doug Wright	
Warriors	2027	Broadway	Lin-Manuel Miranda and Eisa Davis	Miranda and Davis	Miranda and Davis	Based on the 2024 concept album of the same name by Lin-Manuel Miranda and Eisa Davis; adapted from 1979 film The Warriors.
Wasted	2018	Fringe and suburban, London	Christopher Ash	Carl Miller	Carl Miller	
Water for Elephants	2023	Broadway	PigPen Theatre Co.	PigPen Theatre Co.	Rick Elice	Based on the 2006 novel of the same name by Sara Gruen.
We Are The Tigers	2019	Off-Broadway	Preston Max Allen	Preston Max Allen	Preston Max Allen	
We Will Rock You	2002	West End jukebox	Queen	Queen and Ben Elton	Elton	
The Wedding Singer	2006	Broadway	Matthew Sklar	Chad Beguelin	Beguelin and Tim Herlihy	
Welcome to the Voice	2000	Off-off-Broadway	Steve Nieve	Muriel Teodori	Teodori	
The Well of Romance	1930	Broadway	H. Maurice Jacquet	Preston Sturges	Sturges	
Were the World Mine	2008	Film	Jessica Fogle	Fogle	Tom Gustafson and Cory James Krueckeberg	
West Side Story + film (1961) + film (2021)	1957	Broadway	Leonard Bernstein	Stephen Sondheim	Arthur Laurents	Notable songs: "Tonight Quintet", "America" and "Somewhere".
What Makes Sammy Run?	1964	Broadway	Ervin Drake and Budd Schulberg	Drake and Schulberg	Stuart Schulberg	Notable song: "A Room Without Windows".
What's New Pussycat?	2021	Regional	Various	Various	Joe DiPietro	The History of Tom Jones, a Foundling
Where's Charley?	1948	Broadway	Frank Loesser	Loesser	George Abbott	Notable song: "Once in Love with Amy".
Whistle Down the Wind	1998	West End	Andrew Lloyd Webber	Jim Steinman	Patricia Knop, Lloyd Webber and Gale Edwards	
White Christmas + film (1954)	2004	Off-Broadway	Irving Berlin	Berlin	David Ives and Paul Blake	
White Girl in Danger	2023	Off-Broadway	Michael R. Jackson	Michael R. Jackson	Michael R. Jackson	
Whoop Up	1958	Broadway	Mark Charlap	Norman Gimbel	Cy Feuer and Ernest Martin	
Whoopee!	1928	Broadway	Walter Donaldson	Gus Kahn	William Anthony McGuire	Notable song: "Makin' Whoopee".
The Who's Tommy	1993	Broadway	Pete Townshend	Townshend	Townshend and Des McAnuff	Notable song: "Pinball Wizard".
Wicked + film (2024) + film (2025)	2003	Broadway	Stephen Schwartz	Schwartz	Winnie Holzman	Notable songs: "Popular", "For Good" and "Defying Gravity"
The Wild Party (LaChiusa)	2000	Broadway	Michael John LaChiusa and George C. Wolfe	LaChiusa	LaChiusa	
The Wild Party (Lippa)	2000	Off-Broadway	Andrew Lippa	Lippa	Lippa	
Wild, Wild Women	1982	West End	Nola York	Michael Richmond	Michael Richmond	
Wildcat	1960	Broadway	Cy Coleman	Carolyn Leigh	N. Richard Nash	
Wild Rose	2025	Royal Lyceum	Various	Various	Nicole Taylor	
The Will Rogers Follies	1991	Broadway	Cy Coleman	Betty Comden and Adolph Green	Comden and Green	
Willy Wonka	2004	Off-off-Broadway	Leslie Bricusse and Anthony Newley	Bricusse and Newley	Bricusse and Tim McDonald	
Willy Wonka & the Chocolate Factory	1971	Film	Leslie Bricusse and Anthony Newley	Bricusse and Newley	Roald Dahl	Notable songs: "The Candy Man" and "Pure Imagination".
The Wind in the Willows	1986	Broadway	William Perry	Roger McGough and William Perry	Jane Iredale	
Winnie the Pooh	2021	Off-Broadway	Robert B. Sherman and Richard M. Sherman	Sherman and Sherman	Jonathan Rockefeller	
Winnie the Pooh and a Day for Eeyore	1983	Animated film	Robert B. Sherman and Richard M. Sherman	Sherman and Sherman	Peter Young, Steve Hulett and Tony L. Marino	
Winnie the Pooh and the Blustery Day	1968	Animated film	Robert B. Sherman and Richard M. Sherman	Sherman and Sherman	Ralph Wright	
Winnie the Pooh and the Honey Tree	1966	Animated film	Robert B. Sherman and Richard M. Sherman	Sherman and Sherman	Ralph Wright and Ken Anderson	
Winnie the Pooh and Tigger Too	1974	Animated film	Robert B. Sherman and Richard M. Sherman	Sherman and Sherman	Larry Clemmons, Ted Berman and Eric Cleworth	
Wish You Were Here	1952	Broadway	Harold Rome	Rome	Arthur Kober and Joshua Logan	
The Witches of Eastwick	2000	West End	Dana P. Rowe	John Dempsey	Dempsey	
The Wiz	1975	Broadway	Charlie Smalls and Luther Vandross	Smalls and Vandross	William F. Brown	Notable song: "Ease On down the Road"
The Wiz	1978	Film	Charlie Smalls and Luther Vandross	Smalls and Vandross	Joel Schumacher	
The Wizard of Oz	1902	Off-Broadway	Various artists	Various artists	L. Frank Baum and Glen MacDonough	
The Wizard of Oz	1939	Film	Harold Arlen	E. Y. Harburg	Noel Langley, Florence Ryerson and Edgar Allan Woolf	Notable song: "Over the Rainbow"
The Wizard of Oz	1942	Off-off-Broadway	Harold Arlen	E. Y. Harburg	Frank Gabrielson	
The Wizard of Oz	1987	West End	Harold Arlen and Herbert Stothart	E. Y. Harburg	John Kane	
The Wizard of Oz	2011	West End	Harold Arlen and Andrew Lloyd Webber	E. Y. Harburg and Tim Rice	Andrew Lloyd Webber and Jeremy Sams	
The Woman in White	2004	West End	Andrew Lloyd Webber	David Zippel	Charlotte Jones	
Woman of the Year	1981	Broadway	John Kander	Fred Ebb	Peter Stone	
Women on the Verge of a Nervous Breakdown	2010	Broadway	David Yazbek	David Yazbek	Jeffrey Lane	
A Wonderful Life	1991	Off-off-Broadway	Joe Raposo	Sheldon Harnick	Harnick	
Wonderful Town	1953	Broadway	Leonard Bernstein	Betty Comden and Adolph Green	Joseph Fields and Jerome Chodorov	
The Wonderful Wizard of Oz	2000	Off-off-Broadway	James Patrick Doyle	Doyle and Joe Cascone	Cascone	
Wonderland	2011	Broadway	Frank Wildhorn	Jack Murphy	Murphy and Gregory Boyd	Notable song: "I Will Prevail".
The Woodsman	2012	Off-Broadway	Edward W. Hardy	Jennifer Loring	James Ortiz	Notable song: "Rusting Tin Man".
Words and Music	1932	West End revue	Noël Coward	Coward	Coward	
Working	1978	Broadway revue	Various artists	Various artists	Stephen Schwartz and Nina Faso	
Wuthering Heights	1992	Concept album	Bernard J. Taylor	Taylor	—N/a	

== X ==
X
Production	Year	Venue/type	Music	Lyrics	Book	Notes
Xanadu	2007	Broadway	Jeff Lynne and John Farrar	Lynne and Farrar	Douglas Carter Beane	Based on the 1980 film.

== Y ==
Y
Production	Year	Venue/type	Music	Lyrics	Book	Notes
A Year with Frog and Toad	2003	Off-Broadway	Robert Reale	Willie Reale	Willie Reale	
Yellow Submarine	1968	Film	The Beatles and George Martin	The Beatles and Martin	Various writers	
Yentl	1983	Film	Michel Legrand and Alan Bergman	Marilyn Bergman	Barbra Streisand and Jack Rosenthal	
The Yeomen of the Guard	1888	West End	Arthur Sullivan	W. S. Gilbert	Gilbert and Sullivan	
Yes Nurse! No Nurse!	2002	Film	Pelle Bolander and Raymund van Santen	Bolander and van Santen	Pieter Kramer and Frank Houtappels	
You Said It	1931	Broadway	Harold Arlen	Jack Yellen	Yellen and Sid Silvers	
Young Frankenstein	2007	Broadway	Mel Brooks	Brooks	Thomas Meehan and Brooks	Notable songs: "Puttin’ On the Ritz", "He Vas My Boyfriend", and "Deep Love"
Your Own Thing	1968	Off-Broadway	Hal Hester and Danny Apolinar	Hester and Apolinar	Donald Driver	
You're a Good Man, Charlie Brown	1971	Broadway	Clark Gesner	Gesner	John Gordon	Based on the comic strip Peanuts. The 1999 revival includes additional music and lyrics by Andrew Lippa, and dialogue by Michael Mayer.

== Z ==
Z
Production	Year	Venue/type	Music	Lyrics	Book	Notes
Zanna, Don't!	2002	Off-Broadway	Tim Acito	Acito and Alexander Dinelaris	Acito and Dinelaris	Notable songs: "I Could Write Books" and "Blow Winds".
Zenda	1963	Off-Broadway	Vernon Duke	Lenny Adelson, Sid Kuller and Martin Charnin	Everett Freeman	Musical adaptation of the Anthony Hope novel The Prisoner of Zenda.
Ziegfeld Follies	1946	Film	Various artists	Various artists	David Freedman	
Ziegfeld Follies of 1909	1909	Broadway revue	Various artists	Various artists	—N/a	
Ziegfeld Follies of 1910	1910	Broadway revue	Various artists	Various artists	—N/a	
Ziegfeld Follies of 1911	1911	Broadway revue	Various artists	Various artists	—N/a	
Ziegfeld Follies of 1912	1912	Broadway revue	Various artists	Various artists	—N/a	
Ziegfeld Follies of 1913	1913	Broadway revue	Various artists	Various artists	—N/a	
Ziegfeld Follies of 1914	1914	Broadway revue	Various artists	Various artists	—N/a	
Ziegfeld Follies of 1915	1915	Broadway revue	Various artists	Various artists	—N/a	
Ziegfeld Follies of 1917	1917	Broadway revue	Various artists	Various artists	—N/a	
Ziegfeld Follies of 1919	1919	Broadway revue	Various artists	Various artists	—N/a	
Ziegfeld Follies of 1920	1920	Broadway revue	Various artists	Various artists	—N/a	
Ziegfeld Follies of 1921	1921	Broadway revue	Various artists	Various artists	—N/a	
Ziegfeld Follies of 1922	1922	Broadway revue	Various artists	Various artists	—N/a	
Ziegfeld Follies of 1923	1923	Broadway revue	Various artists	Various artists	—N/a	
Ziegfeld Follies of 1924	1924	Broadway revue	Various artists	Various artists	—N/a	
Ziegfeld Follies of 1927	1927	Broadway revue	Various artists	Various artists	—N/a	
Ziegfeld Follies of 1931	1931	Broadway revue	Various artists	Various artists	—N/a	
Ziegfeld Follies of 1934	1934	Broadway revue	Various artists	Various artists	—N/a	
Ziegfeld Follies of 1936	1936	Broadway revue	Various artists	Various artists	—N/a	
Ziegfeld Follies of 1943	1943	Broadway revue	Various artists	Various artists	—N/a	
Ziegfeld Follies of 1957	1957	Broadway revue	Various artists	Various artists	—N/a	
Ziegfeld Follies of 1958	1958	Broadway revue	Various artists	Various artists	—N/a	
Ziegfeld Girl	1941	Film	Herbert Stothart	Stothart	William Anthony McGuire	
Ziegfeld Girls of 1920	1920	Broadway revue	Various artists	Various artists	—N/a	
Ziegfeld Midnight Frolic	1917–1921, 1928	Broadway revue	Various artists	Various artists	—N/a	
Zig-Zag is not a film	1917	West End revue	Dave Stamper	Gene Buck	—N/a	
Zip Goes a Million	1951	West End	George Posford	Eric Maschwitz	Maschwitz	
Zipp!	2003	West End revue	Various artists	Various artists	Gyles Brandreth and Stewart Nicholls	
Zombie Prom	1993	Off-Broadway	Dana P. Rowe	John Dempsey	Dempsey	
Zombies	2018	Film	George S. Clinton	Clinton	David Light and Joseph Raso	Disney Channel Original Movie
Zombies from The Beyond	1995	Off-Broadway	James Valcq	Valcq	Valcq	
Zorba	1968	Broadway	John Kander	Fred Ebb	Joseph Stein	
Zorro	2008	West End	Gipsy Kings and John Cameron	Stephen Clark	Stephen Clark and Helen Edmundson	
Zuleika	1954	Off-West End	Peter Tranchell	James Ferman	Ferman	

== See also ==
- List of musicals: A to L
- List of notable musical theatre productions
- List of operettas
- List of Bollywood films
- List of rock musicals
