= Joan Ryan =

Joan Ryan may refer to:

- Joan Ryan (actress), American actress and singer
- Joan Ryan (politician) (born 1955), British politician
