= List of rock musicals =

The following is a list of rock musicals organized chronologically by the start date of the original run. The author of the book, lyrics, and music of each piece is also noted.

- 1966 On the Flip Side on ABC Stage 67 by Burt Bacharach and Hal David
- 1966 The Golden Screw by Tom Sankey
- 1967 Hair written by James Rado, Gerome Ragni and Galt MacDermot.
- 1968 Your Own Thing by Hal Hester and Danny Apolinar
- 1969 Salvation by Peter Link and C.C. Courtney
- 1970 Jesus Christ Superstar by Tim Rice and Andrew Lloyd Webber
- 1970 The Survival of St. Joan by James Lineberger and Hank & Gary Ruffin
- 1971 Godspell by Stephen Schwartz and John-Michael Tebelak.
- 1971 Soon by Joseph M. Kookolis and Scott Fagan
- 1971 Two Gentlemen of Verona by John Guare, Mel Shapiro and Galt MacDermot
- 1972 Grease by Jim Jacobs and Warren Casey
- 1972 Dude by Galt MacDermot
- 1972 Pippin by Stephen Schwartz, Roger O. Hirson and Bob Fosse
- 1973 The Rocky Horror Show by Richard O'Brien
- 1973 La Révolution Française by Claude-Michel Schönberg and Raymond Jeannot, book by Alain Boublil and Jean-Max Rivière
- 1973 An Imaginary Report on an American Rock Festival, book by Tibor Déry and music by Locomotiv GT
- 1974 Phantom of the Paradise by Brian De Palma and Paul Williams
- 1975 The Lieutenant by Gene Curty, Nitra Scharfman and Chuck Strand
- 1975 The Wiz by Charlie Smalls
- 1976 Evita by Tim Rice and Andrew Lloyd Webber
- 1976 Rockabye Hamlet by Cliff Jones
- 1978 Jeff Wayne's Musical Version of The War of the Worlds by Jeff Wayne
- 1978 Working, book by Stephen Schwartz and Nina Faso, music and lyrics by Schwartz, Craig Carnelia, Micki Grant, James Taylor and others
- 1979 Pink Floyd – The Wall written by Roger Waters, based on Pink Floyd's album, The Wall (1979), which was also mostly written by Waters
- 1979 Starmania by Michel Berger and Luc Plamondon
- 1979 In Trousers by William Finn
- 1981 Dreamgirls by Henry Krieger and Tom Eyen
- 1982 Little Shop of Horrors by Howard Ashman and Alan Menken
- 1983 The Human Comedy by Galt MacDermot
- 1983 István, a király (Stephen, the King) by János Bródy and Levente Szörényi
- 1984 Chess by Tim Rice, Björn Ulvaeus and Benny Andersson
- 1984 Starlight Express by Andrew Lloyd Webber
- 1986 Time by Dave Clark, David Soames and Jeff Daniels and additional songs by David Pomeranz
- 1988 Lāčplēsis by Zigmārs Liepiņš and Māra Zālīte
- 1989 Miss Saigon by Claude-Michel Schönberg and Alain Boublil, with Richard Maltby Jr., based on Giacomo Puccini's opera Madame Butterfly
- 1989 Return to the Forbidden Planet by Bubble Theatre Company
- 1989 The Iron Man by Pete Townshend, based on Ted Hughes' book The Iron Man.
- 1990 Paris by Jon English and David Mackay
- 1993 Randy Newman's Faust by Randy Newman
- 1993 The Who's Tommy by Pete Townshend, adaptation of The Who's rock opera
- 1994 The Scarlet Letter by Mark Governor based on the Nathaniel Hawthorne novel
- 1995 Buddy: The Buddy Holly Story songs by Buddy Holly and others
- 1995 An American Tragedy by Charles Strouse and Lee Adams
- 1996 Rent by Jonathan Larson
- 1997 Bat Boy by Laurence O'Keefe
- 1997 Tanz der Vampire by Jim Steinman (2002 as Dance of the Vampires)
- 1998 Hedwig and the Angry Inch, book by John Cameron Mitchell, music and lyrics by Stephen Trask
- 1998 Kat and the Kings by Taliep Petersen and David Kramer
- 1998 Quadrophenia by Pete Townshend, adaptation of The Who's rock opera
- 1998 The Capeman by Paul Simon
- 1999 Rasputin – Miracles Lie in the Eye of the Beholder by Michael Rapp
- 2000 Bare: A Pop Opera, book by Jon Hartmere Jr. and Damon Intrabartolo, lyrics by Hartmere and music by Intrabartolo
- 2000 Aida by Elton John and Tim Rice, based on Giuseppe Verdi's classical opera Aida
- 2000 Machina/The Machines of God and Machina II/The Friends & Enemies of Modern Music by The Smashing Pumpkins
- 2001 tick, tick... BOOM! by Jonathan Larson and David Auburn
- 2001 Peggy Sue Got Married by Bob Gaudio and Jerry Leichtling
- 2002 Movin' Out based on the music of Billy Joel
- 2002 Yoshimi Battles the Pink Robots, Pt. 1 by The Flaming Lips
- 2002 Hairspray by Marc Shaiman and Scott Wittman
- 2002 We Will Rock You featuring the music of Queen, book by Ben Elton
- 2003 Jerry Springer: The Opera by Stewart Lee and Richard Thomas, based on the television show The Jerry Springer Show
- 2003 Taboo by Boy George based on the New Romantic club scene in London in the 1980s.
- 2005 Bleach by Studio Pierrot based on Bleach by Tite Kubo
- 2005 Jersey Boys by Bob Gaudio and Bob Crewe
- 2005 Lestat by Elton John and Bernie Taupin
- 2005 Rock of Ages featuring 1980s rock music, book by Chris D'Arienzo
- 2006 Tenacious D in The Pick of Destiny by Jack Black and Kyle Gass
- 2006 Spring Awakening by Duncan Sheik and Steven Sater, based on the play by Frank Wedekind.
- 2006 Passing Strange by Stew
- 2006 Tarzan by Phil Collins and David Henry Hwang
- 2006 High Fidelity by Tom Kitt and Amanda Green
- 2007 Moon Landing by Stephen Edwards
- 2007 Sunshine on Leith, book by Stephen Greenhorn
- 2008 Lovelace: A Rock Musical by Anna Waronker and Charlotte Caffey
- 2008 Once Upon a Midnight by Tim Lucas and Alex Vickery-Howe
- 2008 Repo! The Genetic Opera by Darren Smith and Terrance Zdunich
- 2008 Rockford's Rock Opera by Steve Punt and Matthew Sweetapple
- 2008 Next to Normal by Tom Kitt and Brian Yorkey
- 2008 Razia's Shadow by Thomas and Paul Dutton
- 2009 Second Chance by Stéphane Prémont
- 2009 Memphis by Joe DiPietro and David Bryan
- 2009 The Toxic Avenger by Joe DiPietro and David Bryan
- 2010 Bloody Bloody Andrew Jackson, book by Alex Timbers and music by Michael Friedman.
- 2010 American Idiot by Green Day
- 2011 Spider-Man: Turn Off the Dark by Bono and The Edge
- 2012 The Devil's Carnival by Darren Smith and Terrance Zdunich
- 2012 Raiding the Rock Vault by John Payne and David Kershenbaum
- 2013 Metalocalypse: The Doomstar Requiem by Brendon Small
- 2013 American Psycho by Duncan Sheik
- 2014 Heathers by Laurence O'Keefe and Kevin Murphy
- 2014 The Island of Doctor Moron by Chris Dockrill and Lyn Dockrill
- 2014 Rockville 2069: A Rock Musical by Johnny Ray and Bruno Paiola
- 2014 The Lightning Thief: The Percy Jackson Musical, book Joe Tracz and music and lyrics by Rob Rokicki
- 2015 School of Rock by Andrew Lloyd Webber, Glenn Slater and Julian Fellowes
- 2015 That Bloody Woman by Luke Di Somma and Gregory Cooper
- 2017 Bat Out of Hell by Jay Scheib and Jim Steinman
- 2017 The Band by Tim Firth and Take That
- 2017 Head over Heels by The Go-Go's
- 2018 Moulin Rouge by various, book by John Lohan
- 2018 Beetlejuice book by Scott Brown and Anthony King, music and lyrics by Eddie Perfect
- 2018 All Out of Love by Air Supply
- 2019 Jagged Little Pill, book by Diablo Cody, lyrics by Alanis Morissette and music by Alanis Morissette and Glen Ballard.
- 2026 Galileo book by Danny Strong, music and lyrics by Zoe Sarnak and Michael Weiner.

== See also ==
- Rock opera
