= James Shelton (songwriter) =

American songwriter

James Shelton was an American Broadway actor, composer, and writer. He is best known for being the songwriter of "Lilac Wine" (1950), which has been covered by numerous artists.

== Musicals and revues ==
- New Faces of 1934, produced by Leonard Sillman. Music by James Shelton with Henry Fonda, March 15, 1934 – July 1934
- Who's Who, March 1, 1938 – March 1938
- The Straw Hat Revue, September 29, 1939 – December 2, 1939
- Dance Me a Song, January 20, 1950 – February 18, 1950
- Mrs Patterson, December 1, 1954 – February 26, 1955
- Almost Crazy, music by James Shelton, June 20, 1955 – July 2, 1955
