= Good Morning, Miss Bliss =

American teen sitcom television series (1988–1989)

- Also known as: Saved by the Bell: The Junior High Years
- Genre: Teen sitcom
- Created by: Sam Bobrick
- Starring: Hayley Mills; Dennis Haskins; Joan Ryan; Max Battimo; Dustin Diamond; Mark-Paul Gosselaar; Heather Hopper; Lark Voorhies; T. K. Carter
- Theme music composer: Charles Fox
- Opening theme: "These Are the Best of Times"
- Country of origin: United States
- Original language: English
- No. of seasons: 1
- No. of episodes: 13 (+ original pilot)

Production
- Executive producer: Peter Engel
- Camera setup: Multi-camera
- Running time: 22–24 minutes
- Production companies: Peter Engel Productions; NBC Productions

Original release
- Network: NBC (pilot only); Disney Channel
- Release: July 11, 1987
- Release: November 30, 1988 – March 18, 1989

Related
- Saved by the Bell

Good Morning, Miss Bliss, also retroactively known as Saved by the Bell: The Junior High Years, is an American teen sitcom that originally aired on Disney Channel from November 30, 1988, until March 18, 1989 (and later also in syndication as part of the Saved by the Bell rerun package). Starring Hayley Mills as a teacher, the series takes place at the John F. Kennedy Junior High School in Indianapolis, Indiana. After one season on the air on the Disney Channel, the show was retooled as Saved by the Bell, which aired on NBC.

Three members of the original cast for the pilot were Jonathon Brandis, Jaleel White, and Brian Austin Green.

The show was the first program produced by a Big Three network for cable television – in this case, NBC produced it for Disney Channel.

== Plot ==
The series focuses on the life of junior high school teacher Miss Carrie Bliss (Hayley Mills) at John F. Kennedy Junior High in Indianapolis. She is often put into morally difficult situations by her work and often serves as the only person her students could turn to. Her eighth grade students include:

Zack Morris (Mark-Paul Gosselaar), a charming, manipulative scamp. He is lazy, a bad student and always looking for the easy way out. Nonetheless, in the episode "Parents and Teachers", Miss Bliss says that Zack has the most potential of all her students.

Lisa Turtle (Lark Voorhies), a rich shopaholic; and best friend of Nikki. Lisa is the crush of many guys in the school and in Miss Bliss's class, especially Screech.

Samuel "Screech" Powers (Dustin Diamond), an awkward nerd with a crush on Lisa, but an excellent student and very honest.

Mikey Gonzalez (Max Battimo), Zack's best friend, who, although not generally as awkward as Screech, becomes quite shy around girls; a good student, especially in math and history but sometimes gets into conflict with Zack.

Nikki Coleman (Heather Hopper), who is outspoken and often advocates for the moral course of action when the others decide to misbehave.

The show also features Mylo Williams (T. K. Carter), a maintenance supervisor, and Miss Tina Paladrino (Joan Ryan), a quirky teacher and friend of Miss Bliss, with whom she often discusses her personal life, with Miss Paladrino acting as sounding board. Dennis Haskins plays the school principal, Mr. Richard Belding.

The show was cancelled after 13 episodes, and NBC reclaimed the rights to it, reformatting Good Morning, Miss Bliss into Saved by the Bell; the characters of Zack, Lisa, Screech and Mr. Belding made the transition to Saved by the Bell, which instead saw the four located in the fictional California suburb of Bayside.

The series was then integrated into the Saved by the Bell syndicated rerun package, with Miss Bliss episodes being introduced with a cold open by Mark-Paul Gosselaar (in character as Zack Morris) explaining that they were from an earlier time frame than the rest of the series, followed by a retrofitted version of the regular Saved by the Bell opening sequence.

== Cast ==
- Hayley Mills as Miss Carrie Bliss
- Dennis Haskins as Mr. Richard Belding
- Joan Ryan as Miss Tina Paladrino
- Mark-Paul Gosselaar as Zachary "Zack" Morris
- Max Battimo as Michael "Mikey" Gonzalez
- Dustin Diamond as Samuel "Screech" Powers
- Heather Hopper as Nicole "Nikki" Coleman
- Lark Voorhies as Lisa Turtle
- T. K. Carter as Mylo Williams

== Episodes ==
No.	Title	Directed by	Written by	Original release date
0	"Pilot"	Peter Bonerz	Sam Bobrick	July 11, 1987
On the first day of school, Miss Bliss (Hayley Mills) tries to help a student who she learns is having difficulty dealing with a situation in which his older brother who is dying. Note: This episode only aired once on NBC in the regular primetime timeslot of The Facts of Life. Later episodes aired on Disney Channel. It is also the only episode in the franchise outside of Saved by the Bell: The New Class to not feature the characters Zack Morris, Lisa Turtle, or Samuel "Screech" Powers. A different version of Mr. Belding, known as Gerald Belding, was played by Oliver Clark. Finally, Jonathan Brandis, Jaleel White, and Brian Austin Green were featured in the cast.
1	"Summer Love"	Burt Brinckerhoff	Peter Engel	November 30, 1988
Zack finds out the attractive girl he had a summer romance with has transferred to his school, but Karen (Carla Gugino) believed Zack when he said he was her age and doesn't react well when his cover-up of the fact emerges. Zack learns a lesson about lying to people.
2	"Love Letters"	Burt Brinckerhoff	David Garber & Bruce E. Kalish	December 7, 1988
Screech asks Zack to write a love letter from him to Lisa, and Zack agrees but also forces Screech to write an English paper for him. The letter causes a lot of problems before Miss Bliss figures things out and hits Zack and Screech with harsh penalties.
3	"Wall Street"	Burt Brinckerhoff	Jake Weinberger & Mike Weinberger	December 14, 1988
While doing a class project on stocks, Zack invests the class's money (provided by Miss Bliss) in a charity called the Wishing Star Foundation. Things go well at first, and then they do not go well at all.
4	"Leaping to Conclusions"	Burt Brinckerhoff	Susan Sebastian & Diana Ayers	December 21, 1988
Nikki refuses to do the science class's frog dissection and takes direct action to ensure no one else can, before considering the impact of dogmaticism.
5	"Parents and Teachers"	Gary Shimokawa	Lawrence H. Levy	December 28, 1988
Zack's dad Peter (Robert Pine) meets Miss Bliss at a parent/teacher conference and they find they are attracted to one another.
6	"Showdown"	Gary Shimokawa	R.J. Colleary	January 4, 1989
Screech's friends encourage him to stand up to bully Deke Simmons (Andras Jones) and Screech, also Miss Bliss, find out Deke has real problems and is not a complete monster.
7	"Save the Last Dance for Me"	Gary Shimokawa	Gwyn Gurian & Skip Frank	February 4, 1989
Miss Bliss convinces a very reluctant Mr. Belding to end his ban on school dances. But after Shana (Alexondra Lee) whom Mikey likes, asks Zack to a dance instead there could be a huge problem.
8	"The Boy Who Cried Rat"	Gary Shimokawa	Robert Burris & Michael Ware	February 11, 1989
Miss Bliss is a candidate for Teacher of the Year; Zack lets Screech's pet rat out into the school to avoid a midterm.
9	"Let's Get Together"	Burt Brinckerhoff	Michael Poryes	February 18, 1989
As Miss Bliss first helps and then gets fed up with her best friend Tina over Tina's selfishness and bad judgment, Nikki and Zack's history project is at risk because she harps on everything he does and he's flippant about it. Eventually, all parties find positive resolutions.
10	"Practical Jokes"	Gary Shimokawa	Howard Ostroff	February 25, 1989
A mock trial is held after a series of practical jokes ends in one that breaks Miss Bliss's "unfooled" streak. Miss Bliss then reveals the joke she pulled on the students in order to get them to study the Constitution for their class better. However, she really ends up falling victim to Screech's prank.
11	"Stevie"	Burt Brinckerhoff	Jake Weinberger & Mike Weinberger	March 4, 1989
Zack bets Nikki he can kiss pop singer Stevie (Suzanne Tara).
12	"Clubs and Cliques"	Burt Brinckerhoff	Michael Poryes & R.J. Colleary	March 11, 1989
Zack is embarrassed by some older students who invite him into a "cool" club and ashamed that he mistreats his real friends in the process. Miss Bliss and Mr. Belding trade places for a week.
13	"The Mentor"	Gary Shimokawa	Story by : Jim Carlson & Terrence McDonnell; Teleplay by : Jim Carlson, Terrence McDonnell, & Michael Poryes	March 18, 1989
Miss Bliss's former teacher Mr. James Lyman (Robert Donner) returns and causes controversy with his teaching methods, later revealing he's being forced into retirement.

== Broadcast ==
=== Original pilot ===
The original pilot for Good Morning, Miss Bliss aired on July 11, 1987, on NBC (in The Facts of Life's timeslot). Hayley Mills would be the only actress to carry over from the pilot to the series. Brian Austin Green as Adam Montcrief, Jaleel White as Bobby Wilson, and Jonathan Brandis as Michael Thompson were among some of the actors to appear in the pilot. Green was, in essence, the "lead" student in the pilot, a particularly serious student, who wore business suits.

Several other characters from the series existed in the pilot but were played by different actors; Mr. Gerald Belding was played by Oliver Clark, and Miss Tina Paladrino was played by Maria O'Brien. Other characters include Gabriel Damon as Bradley; Samantha Mills as Wendy; Julie Ronnie as Lonnie Maple; Matt Shakman as Georgie Winslow; Charles Siebert as Charlie Davis; Britton Elliott as Janet Hillhurst; Josh Goddard as Steven; and Andrea Messersmith as Laurie.

=== Syndication ===
After the huge success of Saved by the Bell, episodes of this series were added to the syndication package. Intros by Mark-Paul Gosselaar, in character as Zack Morris, were added to the beginning of each episode, and the title sequence was remade in the style of Saved by the Bell. The series reran on TBS, along with its spinoff. Good Morning, Miss Bliss and Saved by the Bell were later aired on The N from late 2008 to July 2009. As of February 2015, Netflix syndication of Saved by the Bell also reflects this change.

Although the Saved by the Bell intro was modified to accommodate the Miss Bliss cast, it was incompletely customized for those episodes. The reflection in the animated sunglasses shows images of Bayside High and The Max, locations that were not present in the Indiana-set Good Morning, Miss Bliss.

== Home media ==
The complete series of Good Morning, Miss Bliss was released by Shout Factory with the Saved by the Bell: The Complete Collection DVD set on October 2, 2018.

== Reception ==
The Good Morning, Miss Bliss pilot drew an 11.1 household rating and 25 share on NBC.
