= Max Battimo =

American hockey referee and actor

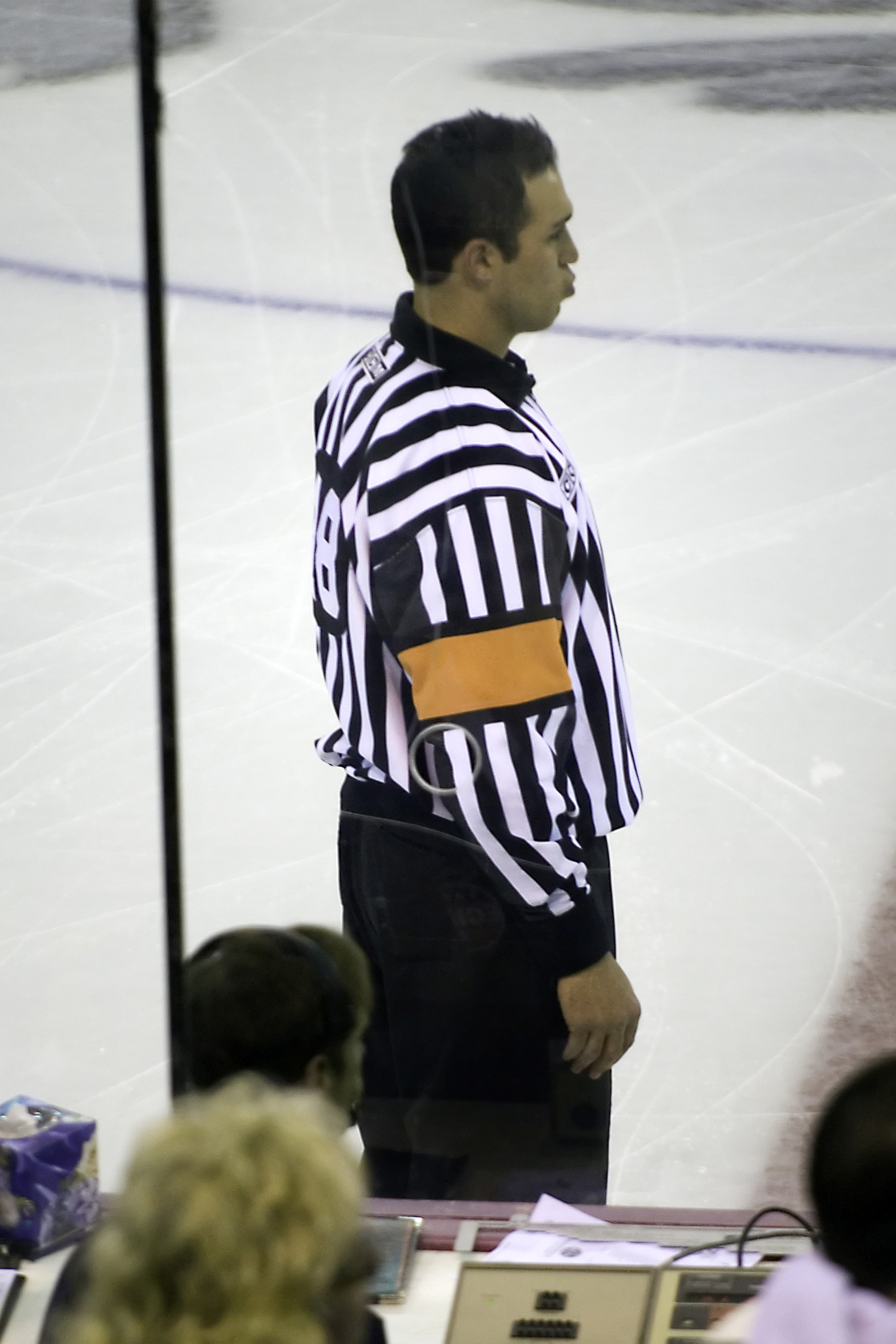
- Referee Max Battimo during anthem, 2007
- Born: August 31, 1974 (age 51); Argentina

Maximiliano Cardenas Battimo (born August 31, 1974) is an Argentine hockey official and former actor. At the age of 2, he moved to Los Angeles, California. Max decided he wanted to be an actor at an early age. He played Mikey Gonzalez on Good Morning, Miss Bliss from 1988 to 1989. The show aired for one season (13 episodes) on the Disney Channel before NBC purchased the show. He was among those who did not continue with the original cast when NBC repackaged Good Morning, Miss Bliss into the highly successful Saved by the Bell.

Today, Max is a referee for men's hockey in the Western Collegiate Hockey Association, which is a Division I ice hockey conference.
