= Zipp! (musical) =

- One Hundred Musicals for Less Than the Price of One
- Show Poster
- Book: Gyles Brandreth; Stewart Nicholls
- Basis: Musical theatre shows
- Productions: 2003 West End

Zipp!, One Hundred Musicals for Less Than the Price of One is a musical revue conceived by Gyles Brandreth and Stewart Nicholls. It opened in the West End's Duchess Theatre on February 4, 2003, following previews from January 24. It closed on April 19, 2003.

The show whizzes through a century of Broadway and West End musicals, including the complete works of Andrew Lloyd Webber in 60 seconds.
