= The Magic Basket =

Musical play by Alfred Wheeler

cover art

The Magic Basket is a musical for children written in 1940 by Australian composer Alfred Wheeler, with the book and lyrics written by Bronnie Taylor. The musical was originally published by Australian music publisher Allan & Co. Pty. Ltd. The story involves a group of children whisked to a magical land on the Moon, where they help the Sandman to recover his bag of sleep-dust from Goblins. The children are transported in a magic basket by Mrs Mustard, the Old Woman who Sweeps the Sky.

== Characters ==
- The King of the Moon
- The Queen of the Moon
- Lord High Chancellor
- The Sandman
- Mr Moonshine
- Mrs Mustard
- Face-ache, the leader of the Goblins
- Twinkle, the leader of the Moonbeams
- Children
- Goblins
- Moonbeams, ladies-in-waiting to the Queen
- Newsboy

== Musical numbers ==
- Oh isn't it fun to live in the moon? (sung by Moonbeams)
- Whatever can we do (sung by chorus)
- I sweep the sky (sung by Mrs Mustard and chorus)
- My basket brave and I (sung by chorus)
- Derry derry down Oh! (sung by Queen and chorus)
- Galloping, galloping up in the sky (sung by Children)
- The Sandman (sung by Children and the Sandman)
- Tippetty tippetty toe (sung by Children)
- Goblins bold are we (sung by Goblins)
- If you will be a meddlesome Matty (sung by Children)
- The deed is done (sung by Children)
- Bong! goes the gong (sung by chorus)
- One song before we part (sung by solo and chorus)
- Lullaby (sung by chorus)

== Productions ==
- 1940 Lauriston Girls' School, Melbourne (premiere)
- 1940 Wyalong, New South Wales
- 1940 Mount Barker, South Australia
- 1943 Cloncurry, Queensland
- 1943 Adelaide, South Australia
- 1944 Benalla, Victoria
- 1945 Port Pirie, South Australia
- 1945 Newcastle, New South Wales
- 1946 Adelaide
- 1946 Newcastle, New South Wales
- 1946 North Lismore, New South Wales
- 1946 Newcastle, New South Wales
- 1947 Broken Hill
- 1947 Wagga Wagga, New South Wales
- 1947 Lismore, New South Wales
- 1947 Shepparton, Victoria
- 1947 Grafton, New South Wales
- 1948 Mackay
- 1949 Wyalong, New South Wales
- 1949 Southport, Queensland
- 1949 Scone, New South Wales
- 1950 Nanson, Western Australia
- 1950 Hay, New South Wales
- 1950 Maddington, Western Australia
- 1951 Launceston, Tasmania
- 1951 Sunshine, Victoria
- 1951 Burnie, Tasmania
- 1952 Maryborough, Queensland
- 1952 Braidwood, New South Wales
- 1952 Adelaide, South Australia
- 1952 Grafton, New South Wales
- 1953 Southbrook, Queensland
- 1954 Kygole, New South Wales
- 1954 Broken Hill, South Australia
- 1954 Townsville, Queensland
- 1954 Lithgow, New South Wales
- 1955 Parramatta District Primary Schools, starring Bob Winley as Mr Moonshine and Elaine Marriott as The Queen
- 1957 Penrith, New South Wales
