= Ruthless! =

Ruthless! The Musical
- Los Angeles Cast Recording
- Music: Marvin Laird
- Lyrics: Joel Paley
- Book: Joel Paley
- Productions: 1992 Off-Broadway; 1993 Los Angeles; 2015 Off-Broadway revival 2018 West End

Ruthless! The Musical is an all-female musical with music by Marvin Laird and book and lyrics by Joel Paley that spoofs Broadway musicals, like Gypsy and Mame, and movies such as The Bad Seed and All About Eve. The musical premiered Off-Broadway in 1992.

== Production history ==
The musical opened Off-Broadway at the Players Theatre on March 13, 1992 and closed January 24, 1993 after 342 performances. It was directed by Joel Paley with musical direction by Marvin Laird. (Laird was later the musical director for the Broadway revivals of Annie Get Your Gun (1999) and Gypsy (2003)). The central role of Tina was played by Laura Bell Bundy, with Natalie Portman and Britney Spears as understudies.

Ruthless! The Musical was then produced in Los Angeles at the Canon Theatre, where it opened on November 15, 1993. A recording was made by the 1993 Los Angeles cast on Varèse Sarabande and released on March 29, 1994.

The show won the 1993 New York Outer Critics Circle Award for Best Off-Broadway Musical.

The musical has had a number of professional productions, particularly in regional theatre. Ruthless! The Musical played at the Colony Theatre, Miami, Florida, in January and February 1995, directed by Paley.

The show had its UK premiere in 2002 at London's Stratford Circus Theatre, directed by Omar F. Okai and produced by Simon James Collier, where it won 5 Musical Stages Awards.

The musical ran for nine performances in September 2014 at the Triad Theater in New York City to benefit Broadway Cares/Equity Fights AIDS. The production returned to the Triad in October 2014.

The musical opened Off-Broadway at St. Luke's Theatre on June 25, 2015 (previews), officially on July 13, with direction by Joel Paley, musical direction by Ricky Romano, and music supervision by Marvin Laird. For this production, Paley said: "...In this staging, we’ve done away with the intermission and have streamlined it into 90 minutes that is roller-coaster sharp and fast." The cast features Kim Maresca (Judy Denmark), Tori Murray (Tina), Peter Land (Sylvia St. Croix), Tracy Jai Edwards (Louise), Andrea McCullough (Miss Thorn), and Rita McKenzie (Lita Encore).

The musical made its West End premiere at the Arts Theatre opening on 27 March (previews from 16 March) for a limited run until 23 June 2018, directed by Richard Fitch, choreography by Rebecca Howell and music supervision by Gareth Valentine. A recording of the London production was released by BroadwayHD in 2019.

== Synopsis ==
=== Act I ===
The show begins with Sylvia St. Croix asking the audience where talent comes from. She introduces Judy Denmark, a bland housewife with no talent whatsoever, who’s the mother of a very talented eight-year-old, Tina Denmark (“Prologue”/“Tina’s Mother”). Sylvia enters the Denmark household, asking Judy if she can meet her daughter because she was impressed by her talent after seeing her performance at an elderly home. Judy calls in Tina to meet Sylvia, proclaiming that she is “born to entertain (“Born to Entertain”). Impressed by her abilities, Sylvia states that she wants to become Tina’s talent agent to make her a star. Judy is conflicted, wanting her daughter to have a normal childhood. Sylvia explains to her that Tina is no ordinary child, and she will become a musical sensation (“Talent”). Judy agrees to let Sylvia become Tina’s acting coach, but only after school. Sylvia wants to start today, but Tina objects because she has auditions for her elementary school’s musical, Pippi in Tahiti.

After school, Tina auditions for the musical, but her classmate Louise Lerman is cast instead of her, and Tina is to play Puddles the dog (“To Play This Part”). Tina is very upset by this, stating that Louise is “too Jewish-looking” to play Pippi. Later, Miss Thorn comes to the Denmark residence. Judy explains to her that Tina is awfully upset about not playing Pippi. Miss Thorn tells her that Tina will get over her disappointment one day and find a more rewarding career, even though Miss Thorn hates her job and wishes she was able to become an actor after failing prior (“Teaching Third Grade”). Sylvia suggests that Tina could be Louise's understudy, and Miss Thorn agrees.

The next day, Sylvia tells Judy about her daughter, who was extremely untalented. Judy, who was adopted, wonders how Tina inherited so much talent, while Sylvia tells her it doesn’t matter (“Where Tina Gets It From”). Louise and Tina rehearse for their school’s musical (“The Pippi Song”), where they do nothing but fight with each other. After exchanging insults, Louise hands Tina a jump rope, giving her a wicked idea (“To Play This Part– Reprise”).

Later, Sylvia and Judy hear that Louise Lerman “accidentally” hung herself with a jump rope. Tina is dismissed from school early, and Judy attempts to comfort her daughter, although Tina is seemingly unphased by the tragedy (“Kisses and Hugs”). Miss Thorn suggests to Judy that Tina may have killed Louise because Louise's wig is found in her backpack. She tells Judy that as Louise’s understudy, she will have to fill in for her at the show tonight (“Teaching Third Grade– Reprise”). After interrogating Tina, she admits she hung Louise so she could be the lead in the play instead. Judy punishes Tina by making her go to her room, but Sylvia enters, excited for Tina’s debut tonight (“Talent– Reprise #1”).

Judy’s adoptive mother Lita Encore, a show critic who hates musicals, arrives at the house, ready to review Tina’s show (“I Hate Musicals”). Judy begs Lita to tell her who her biological parents are, but Sylvia interrupts them. Judy refuses to let Tina participate in show business anymore, much to Sylvia’s dismay. She accuses Judy of only doing so because she is jealous of Tina’s success. She quotes a passage from Lita’s book, “Ruthless: The Life and Times of Ruth DelMarco”, an incredibly talented woman who killed herself after Lita’s bad review of her show, even though Lita believes she is alive and faked her death. This only confuses Judy about her biological parents even more, and Lita admits that Ruth DelMarco is Judy’s biological mother and her real name is Ginger.

Tina reenters, ready to go on stage as Pippi. Sylvia and she practice her songs, but Judy, with her newfound confidence and talent, coaches Tina instead. Tina asks Judy to show her how to sing the Pippi Ballad, and Judy is blown away by her own talent (“Angel Mom”).

=== Act II ===
Judy writes to her husband, Frederick, that she has turned Tina in for murder. Four years later "and two Tony Awards later", Judy Denmark has completely rebranded into Ginger DelMarco, a self-centered diva who has completely abandoned her old ways as a housewife (“Montage”). She lives in a penthouse apartment with her devoted personal assistant, Eve, who secretly resents Ginger and is waiting for the moment she gets to take her place as a broadway star (“A Penthouse Apartment”). Sylvia barges into Ginger’s apartment, informing her that today is the day Tina is going to be released from prison. Ginger laments about her old ways as a housewife (“It Will Never Be That Way Again”). Sylvia demands to become Tina’s agent again, even though Ginger wants Tina nowhere near the business (“I Want The Girl”). She refuses to leave until they have a deal.

Tina enters her mother’s apartment. The two barely recognize each other. Ginger still refuses to let Tina become an actress with her because she understands how dangerous the business can be. Tina doesn’t accept this explanation, convinced that Ginger only turned her in for murder so she could steal her career (“Parents And Children”). Ginger says that she is only doing this to Tina because it’s what her mother, Ruth did to her as a child. Sylvia is very proud of her, and reveals that she has been Ruth DelMarco all along. Ginger forgives Ruth for abandoning her as a child, and they embrace. Ginger tells Ruth that she’ll get to direct her new show, and that Tina will be the child lead’s understudy. Ginger tells Tina that to make it in show business, she will have to be ruthless (“Ruthless!”).

Eve returns in Ginger’s dress to tell her that she should have fun at Sardi’s while she fills in for her in her new show, claiming that she is her understudy. Ginger immediately fires Eve as her assistant, causing Eve to pull a gun on Ginger and reveal she is Betty Lerman, Louise’s mother, and has been plotting revenge on her since Louise's death. Tina tells Eve that she has learned there is more to life than being a star, seemingly to had learn her lesson. But she was being disingenuous and was only distracting Eve so Ginger could take the gun from her. After scuffling, Eve is shot dead by Ginger, and Tina takes the gun. Unexpectedly, Lita enters the apartment to see her granddaughter. While she’s distracted, Ruth steals the gun from Tina, and after a brief altercation, Ruth is shot. Lita comments that Ruth could never sing anyway, so Ruth shoots her dead right before she passes away.

Ginger is so traumatized by the deaths that she returns to being Judy Denmark, a bland, untalented housewife. She and Tina finally reconcile and decides to give up show business and return to their normal lives as mother and daughter. Tina states that there is no money on Broadway anyway and she wants her own TV series, then shoots Judy. Miss Thorn, having given up teaching, is back in New York to become an actor, but Tina shoots her too. Finally, Tina’s father, Frederick, comes back home after being gone the entire musical, and Tina shoots him (“Talent– Reprise #2”).

== Characters and original cast ==
This list shows the original casts of the principal productions

Character	Original Off-Broadway Cast	Original Los Angeles Cast	Off-Broadway Revival Cast	Original West End Cast
Tina Denmark, an 8-year-old aspiring child actress	Laura Bell Bundy	Lindsay Ridgeway	Tori Murray	Charlotte Breen; Fifi Bloomsbury-Khier; Lucy Simmonds; Anya Evans
Judy Denmark/Ginger Del Marco, Tina's Mother and secret Broadway prima donna	Donna English	Joan Ryan	Kim Maresca	Kim Maresca
Lita Encore, a drama critic and Tina's grandmother	Denise Lor	Rita McKenzie	Rita McKenzie	Tracie Bennett
Myrna Thorn/Reporter, Tina's teacher	Susan Mansur	Nancy Linari	Andrea McCullough	Harriet Thorpe
Sylvia St. Croix/Ruth DelMarco, a talent agent	Joel Vig	Loren Freeman	Peter Land	Jason Gardiner
Betty Lerman/Eve, Mother of Louise, the girl Tina killed, and Ginger's assistant	Joanne Baum	Joanne Baum	Tracy Jai Edwards	Lara Denning

- Note: Though the show was written for an all-female cast, it has become somewhat of a tradition to have the role of Sylvia St. Croix performed by a man in drag simply because Joel Vig gave the best audition for the original 1992 production.

== Songs ==
Act I

- "Prologue" – Orchestra and Sylvia
- "Tina's Mother" – Judy
- "Born to Entertain" – Tina
- "Talent" – Sylvia
- "To Play This Part" – Tina
- "Teaching Third Grade" – Miss Thorn
- "Where Tina Gets It From" – Judy and Sylvia
- "The Pippi Song" – Louise
- "Kisses and Hugs" – Tina, Judy
- "Teaching Third Grade (Reprise)" – Miss Thorn
- "Talent (Reprise #1)" – Sylvia
- "I Hate Musicals" – Lita
- "Angel Mom" – Judy and Tina

Act II

- "Entr'acte/Montage" – Orchestra, Judy and Tina
- "A Penthouse Apartment" – Eve
- "It Will Never Be That Way Again" – Ginger
- "I Want the Girl" – Sylvia
- "There's More to Life" – Tina (added for the 2018 West End production)
- "Parents and Children" – Ginger and Tina
- "Ruthless!" – Ginger, Sylvia and Tina
- "Talent (Reprise #2)" – Tina
- "Ruthless! (Reprise)" – Company
- "Unkie's Muncle" (performed by Bernadette Peters and used as a recording in the production)

== Awards and nominations ==
Drama Desk Awards (1991–92)

- Laura Bundy—Outstanding Actress - Musical (nominee)
- Donna English—Outstanding Actress - Musical (nominee)
- Joel Paley—Outstanding Director - Musical (nominee)
- Joel Paley—Outstanding Lyrics (winner)
- "Ruthless"—Outstanding Musical (nominee)

1993 Outer Critics Circle Award

- Best Off-Broadway Musical - (winner)

2002 Musical Stages Magazine Awards, London

- Best Musical Production - Fringe - (winner)
- Best Director - Omar F. Okai - (winner)
- Best Actress in a Musical - Lisa Baird - (winner)
- Best Actor in a Musical - Paul L Martin - (winner)
- Best Writers/Lyricists/Composers of New Work - (winner)
