= Rockville 2069: A Rock Musical =

Rockville 2069
- An Epic Rock Musical
- Music: Johnny Ray
- Lyrics: Johnny Ray and Bruno Paiola
- Book: Johnny Ray and Bruno Paiola
- Productions: 2012 Concert CD Launch, Cape Town; 2014 World Premiere Artscape, Cape Town

Rockville 2069 is a rock musical created by Bruno Paiola and Johnny Ray, with musical composition by Johnny Ray. Its world premiere was at the Artscape Opera House in Cape Town, South Africa on August 29, 2014.

== Development history ==
Bruno Paiola and Johnny Ray wrote the musical's first draft, inspired by the world's environmental concerns. The first draft was then edited by Cape Town-based playwright Justin Wilkinson, before being refined further following feedback from other industry insiders.

Initial arrangements were by Johnny Ray and Kyle Petersen, and these were then scored and adapted by Darryl Andrews in 2010 and 2011. The soundtrack was recorded with sound engineer Andrew Ford and featured artists such as Joseph Clark, Andries Botha, Michael Naranjo, Bronwyn Reddy and Madeleen Falck. The CD launch concert of Rockville 2069: A Rock Musical was held on 18 August 2012 at Kelvin Grove, Newlands, Cape Town, South Africa.

This introduced the graphic novel and concept album to the public, and thereafter the project was developed into a musical with orchestrations completed by Steve J Wright.

Rockville 2069: A Rock Musical, premiered two years later in August 2014. It featured more than sixty artists and musicians from various cultural and musical backgrounds within South Africa.

== Production ==
The world premiere of Rockville 2069 was held 29 August 2014 at the Artscape Opera House in Cape Town, South Africa.

The musical had a cast of 25, musical director Steven J Wright and a creative team consisting of Corinne de Beer and Amanda Klotz (choreography), Kurt Haupt and Francois Botha (vocal coaching). It was accompanied by the Cape Philharmonic Orchestra and the Kyle Petersen Band.

A rock band and a philharmonic orchestra provided the accompaniment to the storytelling. The Cape Philharmonic Orchestra reported their participation in the world premiere event in its publication Concerto.

Technology in the form of live visual mixing with three large LED day-light screens used in the production provide animated 3D backgrounds.

== Story ==
The story is set in the year 2069 as people are gathered to commemorate the 100th anniversary celebration of the 1969 Woodstock Music Festival. Catastrophe suddenly strikes the earth as devastating earthquakes, tsunamis and rising oceans threaten to obliterate the world.

The only area left unscathed is where the festival-goers have gathered. This area is now a small archipelago of islands which has survived the brunt of the devastating chaos and harbours a colourful mix of peace-loving hippies, rock enthusiasts, environmentalists and musicians. Music is a key theme of Rockville's sanctuary and existence. As the planet lies in ruin, the survivors manage to carry on with their lives, cemented by the values that brought them together in the first place. They soon discover that a protective force-field has formed over their home. To keep this force field going, the musicians play at both sunrise and sunset with the resonating sound waves feeding into a generator.

Meanwhile, misfits have somehow forged a miserable life for themselves in the snowy wastelands beyond the force field. These outsiders, the so-called TechnoRemnants, have become jealous of the utopian world of Rockville. The dissatisfied individuals make contact with the outsiders in an attempt to overrun their harmonious world. A tale of greed, treachery and betrayal ensues, only to be resolved in an epic "Battle of the Bands" in the final act. Ultimately, the story of Rockville 2069 is one of love, redemption and salvation where hope lives on despite the odds.

== Critical response ==
The musical was given media coverage by Independent Online (South Africa) in both The Mercury and the Cape Times.

The CD and Graphic Novel launch event was reviewed by The Music Matrix who said, "This musical is full of inspiration, hope, love and passion for the one thing that can bring us all together...Music".

Following the premiere and initial run in Cape Town, South Africa in August 2014, Filmmaker Africa commented that, "The diversity of music styles, from your hippies to your Rasta's, Rockers, Techno Maniacs, worked very well to keep the tempo of the musical score balanced perfectly". The Event stated that, "The comical moments and the plays on words are ingenious".

The Cape Times commented that, "This is the kind of show that has the ability to rekindle the younger generation's interest in musicals".

== Cast ==
The show starred Joseph Clark, Stephan van Huyssteen, Josie Piers, Vicki Jayne and Dylan Edy with a South African cast.

The cast of 32 consists of 5 leads, 15 semi-leads and 12 dancers for the chorus line. Both leads and semi-leads required strong vocal skills while the production's dance elements are also very technically demanding.

== Musical numbers ==
=== Act I ===
Song	Performers
1. Overture	Orchestra
2. Prologue	Entire Cast
3. That Summer	Papa and The Hippie Group
4. Rock On	Tyler, Banjovida and The Rocker Group
5. Music Of The Day	Ozzimba and The Drummer Group
6. One Upon A Time	JohnnyReb and his Crew
7. All That Unfolds	Stache, Velvet, Mama, Papa, Danielle and JohnnyReb
8. Morning Song: Part 1	Papa and The Hippie Group
9. Morning Song: Part 2	Ozzimba, Conga, Bobby Bones and Michelle
10. Morning Song: Part 3	Tyler. Velvet and The Rocker Group
11. Good Vibrations	Prof Starr, Cliff and Stache
12. Survival Made Us Strong	Ice, Glaze, Janis and Freeza
13. Look About With A Laugh And Shout	Danielle with The Hippie and Rocker Groups
14. Our Love Grows (Reprise)	Danielle

=== Act II ===
Song	Performers
1. Live As You Dare (Reprise)	Papa and Mama
2. Time For Change (Techno)	Ice, Janis and Freeza
3. Take It Easy (Reprise)	Papa
4. Taking Back Our Lives (Techno)	Ice and The TechnoRemnant Group
5. Take It Easy	JohnnyReb
6. Time For Change (Reprise)	Papa and Mama
7. Better Than You	Danielle and JohnnyReb
8. Full Moon Grinning Down Brightly	The Hippie, Drummer and Rocker Groups
9. I Will Always Follow You	Danielle
10. Higher	Hippies vs TechnoRemnants
11. Our Love Grows	Drummers vs TechnoRemnants
12. Live As You Dare	Rockers vs TechnoRemnants
13. You Need To Listen	Danielle and Mama
14. The Wind Lay Down: False Start	JohnnyReb
15. The Wind Lay Down: Part 1	JohnnyReb
16. The Wind Lay Down: Part 2	Arch and Entire Cast
17. We Look To You To Save Us True	Entire Cast

== Publishing ==
The original soundtrack has subsequently been expanded from 22 to 25 tracks and is accessible on iTunes and other digital platforms.

A 96-page graphic novel conceived for the project was illustrated by Leandro van der Westhuizen and was designed in a square format resembling an LP sleeve. Both the graphic novel and soundtrack have been released by Next Music, Universal Records for manufacture, marketing and distribution.

The album and graphic novel was adapted for the stage by Johnny Ray and Bruno Paiola and the libretto and score is published by the Dramatic, Artistic and Literary Rights Organisation (DALRO) (Part of SAMRO).
