= Joel Paley =

American director, lyricist and playwright (1955–2025)

- Born: October 6, 1955; Philadelphia, Pennsylvania, U.S.
- Died: January 11, 2025 (aged 69); Milford, Connecticut, U.S.
- Occupations: Director, lyricist, playwright
- Spouse: Marvin Laird (m. 2015; died. 2024)

Joel Paley (October 6, 1955 – January 11, 2025) was an American theatre director, lyricist and playwright. He was best known for co-creating the all-female musical Ruthless! with his creative partner and later husband Marvin Laird.

In 1993, he won a Drama Desk Award and was nominated for one more in the categories Outstanding Lyrics and Outstanding Director of a Musical for the play Ruthless!.

Paley died in Milford, Connecticut, on January 11, 2025, at the age of 69.
