= Joan Ryan (actress) =

American actress and singer

Joan Ryan is an American actress and singer, who played Judy Denmark/Ginger Del Marco in the Los Angeles production of Ruthless!, and Miss Tina Paladrino on Good Morning, Miss Bliss, the television series that became Saved by the Bell.

== Career ==
Ryan was born in Philadelphia, Pennsylvania and raised in Newport Beach, California. She attended the advanced training program at the American Conservatory Theater in San Francisco, and while enrolled, appeared in productions of The Taming of the Shrew, Cyrano de Bergerac and A Doll's House as a member of the conservatory's theater company. Upon completion of the program, Ryan moved to Los Angeles where she performed in productions of Little Shop of Horrors, Footloose, Angry Housewives, Nite Club Confidential, and Joseph and the Amazing Technicolor Dreamcoat.

In 1988, Ryan was cast as Miss Tina Paladrino on the NBC/Disney Channel series Good Morning, Miss Bliss. The show ran for a single season on Disney Channel before being moved to NBC and re-imagined as Saved by the Bell. In 1992, Good Morning, Miss Bliss was renamed Saved by the Bell: The Junior High Years and incorporated into the Saved by the Bell syndication package on TBS.

In 1993, Ryan appeared as Judy Denmark/Ginger Del Marco in the Los Angeles stage production of Ruthless! The Musical. The following year she would also appear on the original cast recording released by Varèse Sarabande.

Alongside her work in theater and television, Ryan also records and performs as a solo vocal artist. Her one-woman show, entitled Joan Ryan Live!, has been performed at clubs including Feinstein's/54 Below, Birdland, Catalina Jazz Club, and The Green Room 42, and in 2013 earned Ryan the title of BroadwayWorld's Best Female Cabaret Artist.

In 2022, Ryan starred as Ruth Bader Ginsburg in the Arizona Theatre Company production of Justice.

== Theatre ==
Production	Role	Location
Ruthless!	Judy Denmark/Ginger Del Marco	Canon Theatre
Mass	"World Without End" Soloist	Hollywood Bowl
Footloose	Vi Moore	Starlight Theatre
Enter the Guardsman	Dresser	Old Globe Theatre
Little Shop of Horrors	Audrey	La Mirada Civic Theatre
Nunsense 2: The Second Coming	Sister Mary Paul/Amnesia	Cerritos Center for the Performing Arts
Joseph and the Amazing Technicolor Dreamcoat	Narrator	Upland Theater
Nite Club Confidential	Dorothy Flynn	Tiffany Theater
Angry Housewives	Jetta	Odyssey Theatre
Suds	Dee Dee	La Mirada Civic Theatre
Anyone Can Whistle	Fay Apple	Dupree Studio Theatre
Rainbow in the Night	Darlene	Matrix Theatre
Justice	Ruth Bader Ginsberg	Arizona Theatre Company

== Television ==
Year	Title	Role	Notes
1988–1989	Good Morning, Miss Bliss	Miss Tina Paladrino	13 episodes
1990	His & Hers	Mrs. Jackson	1 episode
1994	The Young and the Restless	Kathleen Pullman	4 episodes
1994	The Today Show	Musical Guest	1 episode
1997–1999	Chicago Hope	Anesthesiologist	2 episodes
2022	The Wright Turn	Katherine Bailey	3 episodes

== Discography ==
=== Cast recordings ===
- George & Ira Gershwin: A Musical Celebration (1994) — MCA
- Ruthless! (1994) — Varèse Sarabande
- Sondheim: A Celebration (1997) — Varèse Sarabande
- Lerner, Loewe, Lane & Friends (1998) — Varèse Sarabande
- Everyone Has a Story: The Songs of Adryan Russ (2001) — LML Music
- Life Upon the Wicked S.T.A.G.E. (2002) — LML Music
- Dream: Lyrics and Music Of Johnny Mercer (2003) — LML Music
- The Perfect Year: The Music of Andrew Lloyd Webber (2004) — Kritzerland
- Strouse, Schwartz, Schwartz (2006) — Kritzerland

=== Solo albums ===
- Joan Ryan (1995) — LML Music
