= Words and Music =

Words and Music may refer to:

== Film and television ==
- Words and Music (1929 film), a musical directed by James Tinling
- Words & Music, a 1931 musical short film starring Ruth Etting
- Words and Music (1948 film), based on the lives of Richard Rodgers and Lorenz Hart
- Words and Music (Canadian game show), a 1966 Canadian television game show series hosted by Jim Perry
- Words and Music (American game show), a 1970 American game show hosted by Wink Martindale

== Theatre ==
- Words and Music (Noël Coward), a 1932 London musical revue by Noël Coward, later performed on Broadway as Set to Music
- Words and Music (Hitchcock and Goetz), a 1917 Broadway musical revue by Raymond Hitchcock and E. Ray Goetz
- Words and Music (play), a 1962 play by Samuel Beckett
- Words and Music, a 1974 revue written by and starring lyricist Sammy Cahn

== Music ==
=== Albums ===
- Words and Music (Roger Miller album), a 1966 album
- Words and Music (Jimmy Webb album), a 1970 album
- Words & Music, a 1971 comedy album by Benny Hill
- Words and Music (Tavares album), a 1983 album
- Words and Music (Mark Eitzel album), a 1996 album
- Words and Music (Paul Kelly album), a 1998 album
- Words and Music (Glen Campbell album), a 2006 album
- Words and Music, a 2007 album by Richard Rodney Bennett
- Words and Music (Aqualung album), a 2008 album
- Words & Music (Planxty album), a 1983 album
- Words & Music (Aphex Twin album), a 1994 promotional CD
- A 1997 interview CD with Loreena McKennitt, discussing her 1997 album The Book of Secrets
- Words & Music: John Mellencamp's Greatest Hits, a 2004 album
- Words & Music (Swingle II album), the second album by Swingle II

=== Songs ===
- "Words and Music" (song), by Andy Gibb

== Other ==
- Words and Music: A History of Pop in the Shape of a City, a 2005 book by Paul Morley

== See also ==
- Words and Music by Saint Etienne, a 2012 album by Saint Etienne
- Words and Music By..., a 1919 silent film starring Elinor Fair
- Music and Words, an album by Malcolm Middleton
- Music and Lyrics, a 2007 film
