= Marvin Laird =

American composer and conductor (1939–2024)

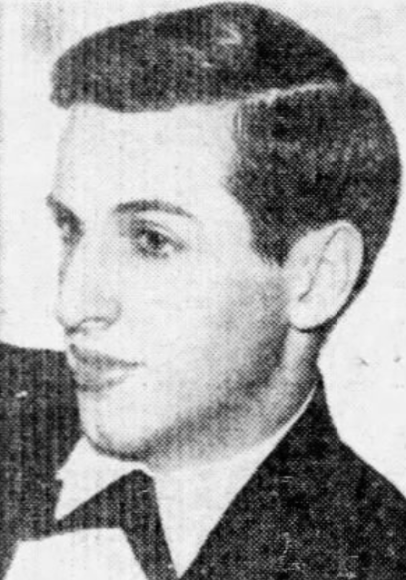
- Laird in 1960
- Born: October 26, 1939; Kansas City, Kansas, U.S.
- Died: December 2, 2024 (aged 85); Bridgeport, Connecticut, U.S.
- Occupation(s): Composer, conductor
- Spouse: Joel Paley (m. 2015)

Marvin E. Laird (October 26, 1939 – December 2, 2024) was an American composer and conductor. He was perhaps best known for writing the dance arrangements in the 1969 film Hello, Dolly! and for co-creating the all-female musical Ruthless! with his creative partner and later husband Joel Paley.

Laird died on December 2, 2024, of natural causes in Bridgeport, Connecticut, at the age of 85. He was survived by his husband Paley, who would also pass away six weeks later on January 11, 2025.
