= Alfred Wheeler (composer) =

Anglican minister and composer (1865–1949)

Reverend Alfred Wheeler (27 October 1865 – 1949) was an Anglican minister and composer of spiritual and romantic music. He arranged children's folk songs and nursery rhymes for publication. He composed other songs and wrote orchestrations for larger choral works. Wheeler lived in Adelaide for eight years on arrival in Australia in 1899 before spending most of his life in Geelong. He was successful and well regarded as a musician and minister. He acted as director of the Australian performing rights organization.

Wheeler composed the score for a 1940 children's musical The Magic Basket with lyrics written by Melbourne university arts graduate Bronnie Taylor (Later Oxford PhD). The premiere played at Lauriston Girls School and was revived in New South Wales, Tasmania and South Australia and more recently in Queensland. The plot entails a magic basket used to recruit children to the moon, where they help the sand man rescue his sleep dust from goblins. Fourteen melodies and dialogue are preserved in Australian libraries.

== Works ==
- 1920: Soot and the Fairies : an amusing cantata suitable for schools
- 1940: The Magic Basket: Children's Musical
- Old Mother Hubbard : a comic quartette for SATB
- 1946: May Joy Be Yours
- 1935: Love Triumphant
- 1937: An Old Fairy Tale
- Pompadour
- The Lord is my Light
- Spring Flowers (trio)
- Little Bo-Peep
- Song The Angels Sing
- Ye Spotted Snakes (Lyrics William Shakespeare)
- Minuet in G
- The Bells (female part song)

== Recordings ==
- 2006 Love triumphant by Edward Larenson
- Humpty dumpty, Goosey goosey gander, Little Bo-peep
- Murmur of the bush
