= Second Chance (musical) =

- Original Quebec City Production
- Music: Frédérick Desroches
- Lyrics: Stéphane Prémont; Alexandre Martel (French adaptation)
- Book: Stéphane Prémont; Jean-Pierre Cloutier; Joëlle Bourdon
- Productions: March 2009 Quebec City February 2010 Quebec City

Second Chance is a rock opera conceived by Stéphane Prémont and Frédérick Desroches about high schoolers' not-so-easy lives. The central character, Johnny, sees his life turn sour because of rumors, betrayal and bad communication. The story deals with suicide, anorexia, drugs and teen pregnancy. It is based on his first play entitled Holding Out for Hero, presented in 1994. He started composing the musical version of the show in 2008, and the finished product was ready later that year, in August. The original run started on March 15, 2009. A French production opened in February 2010 at the Quebec City Salle Dina-Belanger. It was the first professional production of the show.

Stéphane Prémont recently received the "Personnel Engagé" Prize at the "Forces Avenir" gala presented June 14, 2008 at the Capitole's Cabaret in Quebec City.

== Productions ==
The original run of the musical played at the 400-seats Externat Saint-Jean-Eudes' Auditorium under the name Second Chance. The show was performed nine times between March 15, 2009 and March 21, 2009. Stephane Prémont and Émilie Desgagnés directed the production, François Ouellet designed the lighting and Jean-François "Frisco" Roy was the sound engineer. Roxanne Rondeau, Justine Bilodeau, Sarah Morin and Valerie Goulet-Marceau were the choreographers, and Genevieve Brousseau was the vocal arranger.

A new production opened in February 2010 in Quebec City. There were several major changes in the plot, including the translation of the show into French by Alexandre Martel and the show's name changed to Au Pied du Mur. It was a two-week run at the Salle Dina-Bélanger. Jean-Pierre Cloutier, "Conservatoire d'art dramatique de Québec" alumni, directed the new production.

== Musical numbers ==
Act I

- "Prologue" - Company
- "Ouverture" - Johnny, Jennylee, Company
- "Sacrés Coeurs" - Jennylee, Ethan, Company, Johnny
- "Un tango nommé désir" - Ana, Shawn
- "My destiny" - Johnny, Randy, Patrick, Melissande
- "Me verra-t-il un jour?" - Melissande, Mary Jane
- "It's not that easy" - Johnny, Jennylee, Mr. O'Hara
- "Broken glass" - Johnny
- "Sunnier Days" - Heather, Mary Jane
- "Out of his shadow" - Randy, Melissande, Company
- "You’ve been kissed a lot" - Randy, Ana, Mary Jane, Ed, Patrick, Ethan, Jennylee
- "Light at the end of the tunnel" - Randy, Jennylee, Company
- "Time to grow up" - Ana, Randy

Act II

- "Read all about it/Johnny's down" - Randy, Patrick, Ed, Ethan, Jennylee, Company
- "No more" - Ed, Ana
- "Something new" - Ethan, Jennylee, Mr.Webson
- "Broken glass (reprise)" - Johnny, Patrick
- "No one ever has it easy" - Heather, Ed
- "Don't you know" - Randy, Ana
- "Don't you know" (reprise) - Randy, Ana
- "A way out?" - Melissande, Johnny
- "Pick up" - Johnny, Jennylee, Randy, Patrick, Ana
- "Second Chance" - Ana, Randy, Patrick, Company
- "Sunnier days (reprise)" - Jennylee, Company
- "Pick up (reprise)" - Randy, Patrick, Ana, Jennylee, Johnny
- "United we stand (reprise)" - Johnny, Heather, Randy, Ana, Company

== Roles description and original cast members ==
English name	French Name	Voice	2009 Original QC Cast	2010 French Cast
Johnny O'hara	David	Baritenor	Yannick Vezina	Hugo Lapierre
Jennylee Harrison	Marie-Lee	Alto	Marie-Michèle Lamoureux	Marilyn Grenier
Randy Harrison	Félix	Tenor	Pierre-Luc Dionne	Hugo Charland
Ana Lopez	Anna	Mezzo-soprano	Marie-Chantale Dallaire	Marie-Ève Lepage
Patrick Thompson	Patrick	Baritone	Anthony Julien	Hubert Bolduc
Melissande Lafleur	Mélissa	Contralto	Laurie Morin	Marisol Forest
Heather Cross	Esther	Soprano	Marilou Ferland-Daigle	Julie Langlais
Ed Lafitte	Édouard	Tenor	Louis-David Faucher	Simon Dufresne
Mr. O'hara	M. O'hara	Baritone	Christopher Auger	Stéphane Prémont
Mr. Webson	Mme. Champagne	Soprano	Philippe-Olivier Giguère	Mary-Hélène Gagnon
Ethan Vinson	Victor	Baritenor	Raphael Désilets	Alexandre Martel
Mary Jane Smith	Joëlle	Mezzo-Soprano	Laurie Drolet	Sarah Mceniry-Potvin

- 2010 French Cast Understudies : Yannick Vézina (Patrick u/s),
- 2009 Original Quebec City Cast Ensemble and understudies : Genevieve Brousseau (Ana u/s), Stéphane Prémont (Mr. O'Hara u/s), Alexandre Martel(Ed u/s), Justine Bilodeau, Sarah Morin, Valérie Goulet-Marceau, Roxanne Rondeau
- Previous roles that were cut during the productions process :

Character	Last Production	Performer	Reason
Shawn Crowley	09 Original QC Cast	Louis Morin	Mixed into Randy
Lester Jackson	09 Original QC Cast	Nickolas Munger-Bernier	Mixed into Patrick
Kristen Johnson	09 Original QC Cast	Audrey Dion	Cut
Sue Ellen Polanski	09 Original QC Cast	Martine Chamberland	Cut

== On-stage band ==
Name	Instrument
Frédérick Desroches	Conductor, Keyboard
Billy Chabot	Electric Guitar
Olivier Bibeau	Electric Guitar
Louis-André Labadie	Bass Guitar
Alexandre Bibeau	Drums, Percussion
Frédérique Beaulieu-Asselin	Cello

== Official website ==
Au Pied du Mur
