= List of awards and nominations received by Ben Whishaw =

Ben Whishaw awards and nominations
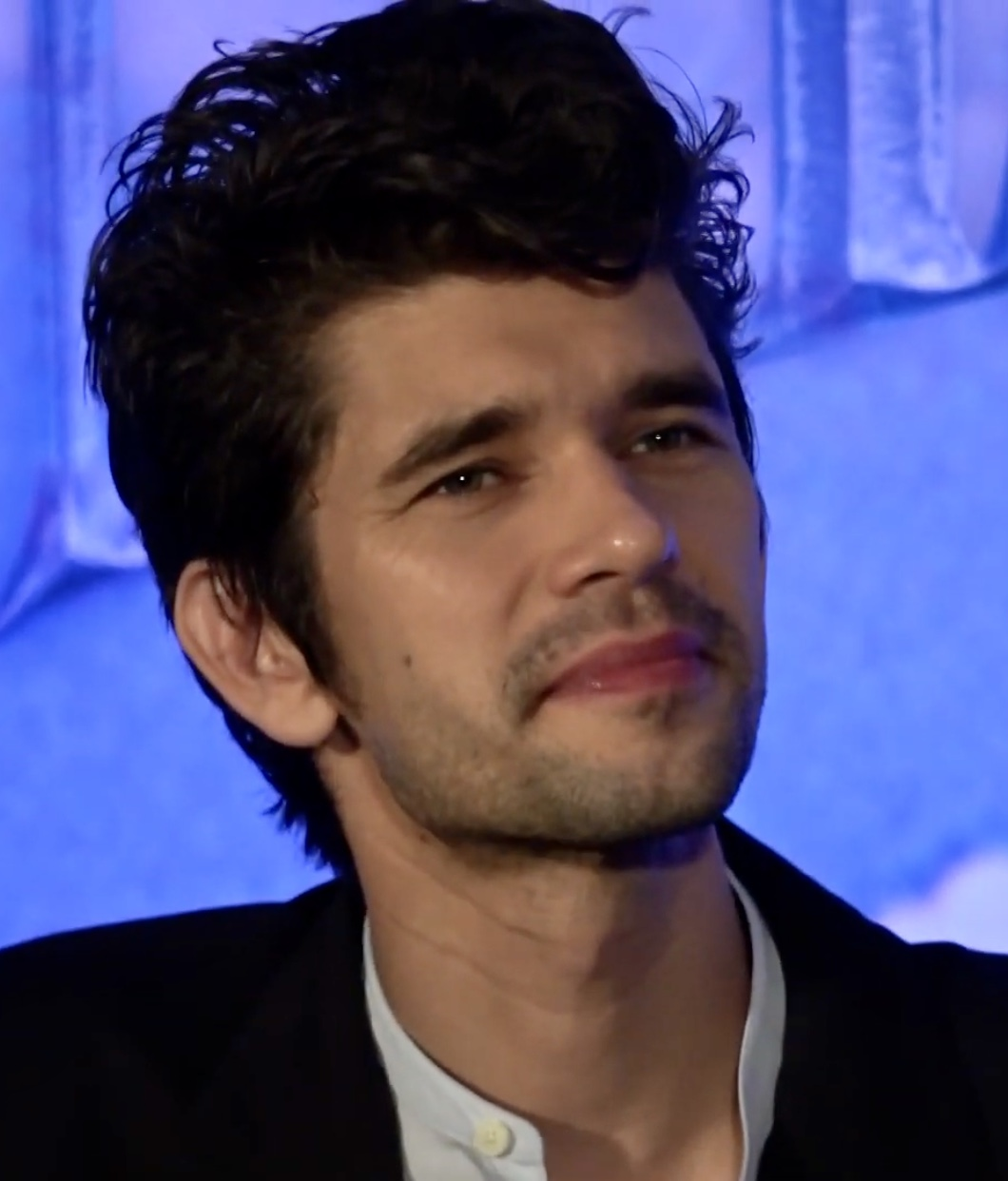
- Whishaw in 2018
Awards and nominations
Award	Wins	Nominations
BAFTA Awards	3	6
Golden Globe Awards	1	1
Emmy Awards	2	2
Laurence Olivier Awards	0	2

Ben Whishaw is an English actor of stage, screen and television. Whishaw is known for his performances in film, television and the theatre. For his work in theatre he was nominated for a Laurence Olivier Award for Best Actor in a Play for his performance as the title role in Hamlet in 2005. He's received two Emmy Award nominations for his work in television winning an International Emmy Award for Best Actor for his performance in the British series Criminal Justice in 2009 and a Primetime Emmy Award for Outstanding Supporting Actor in a Limited Series or Movie for his performance as Norman Scott in the acclaimed limited series A Very English Scandal in 2019.

He also received five BAFTA Award nominations, winning three times: twice for Best Actor for The Hollow Crown in 2013 and for This Is Going to Hurt in 2023 and once for Best Supporting Actor for A Very English Scandal in 2019. He also received a Golden Globe Award for Best Supporting Actor – Series, Miniseries or Television Film for A Very English Scandal.

== Major associations ==
=== Emmy Awards ===
Year	Category	Nominated work	Result	Ref.
International Emmy Awards
2009	Best Actor	Criminal Justice	Won	
Primetime Emmy Awards
2019	Outstanding Supporting Actor in a Limited Series or Movie	A Very English Scandal	Won	

=== BAFTA Awards ===
Year	Category	Nominated work	Result	Ref.
British Academy Film Awards
2007	Rising Star Award		Nominated	
British Academy Television Awards
2009	Best Actor	Criminal Justice	Nominated	
2013	Best Actor	The Hollow Crown: Richard II	Won	
2016	Best Actor	London Spy	Nominated	
2019	Best Supporting Actor	A Very English Scandal	Won	
2023	Best Actor	This Is Going to Hurt	Won	

=== Golden Globe Awards ===
Year	Category	Nominated work	Result	Ref.
2018	Best Supporting Actor – Television	A Very English Scandal	Won	

=== Laurence Olivier Awards ===
Year	Category	Nominated work	Result	Ref.
2005	Best Actor	Hamlet	Nominated	
2025	Best Actor in a Supporting Role	Bluets	Nominated	

=== Screen Actors Guild Awards ===
Year	Category	Nominated work	Result	Ref.
2023	Outstanding Performance by a Cast in a Motion Picture	Women Talking	Nominated	

== Awards ==
=== Industry awards ===
Year	Award	Category	Work	Result	Ref.
2001	British Independent Film Awards	Most Promising Newcomer	My Brother Tom	Won	
2007	Independent Spirit Awards	Robert Altman Award	I'm Not There	Won	
2015	British Independent Film Awards	Best Supporting Actor	The Lobster	Nominated	
2015	National Film Awards UK	Best Supporting Actor	The Lobster	Nominated	
2022	Gotham Awards	Outstanding Performance in a New Series	This Is Going to Hurt	Won	(Note: Producing credits for This Is Going to Hurt.)
2022	Gotham Awards	Outstanding Supporting Performance	Women Talking	Nominated	(Note: Producing credits for This Is Going to Hurt.)
2023	Independent Spirit Awards	Robert Altman Award	Women Talking	Won	
2024	Independent Spirit Awards	Best Supporting Performance	Passages	Nominated	
2026	Independent Spirit Awards	Best Lead Performance	Peter Hujar's Day	Nominated	
2025	Gotham TV Awards	Outstanding Supporting Performance in a Drama Series	Black Doves	Won	

=== Festival awards ===
Year	Award	Category	Work	Result
2001	Sochi International Film Festival	Best Actor	My Brother Tom	Won
2002	Verona Love Screens Film Festival	Best Artistic Contribution	My Brother Tom	Won
2019	Palm Springs International Film Festival	Ensemble Cast Award	A Very English Scandal	Won
2020	Sundance Film Festival	World Cinema Dramatic Special Jury Award for Acting	Surge	Won

=== Critics awards ===
Year	Award	Category	Work	Result
2009	Alliance of Women Film Journalists EDA Awards	Best Depiction of Nudity, Sexuality, or Seduction	Bright Star	Nominated
2016	Outer Critics Circle Awards	Outstanding Actor in a Play	The Crucible	Nominated
2018	Washington D.C. Area Film Critics Association Awards	Best Voice Performance	Paddington 2	Nominated
2018	Indiana Film Journalists Association Awards	Best Vocal/Motion Capture Performance	Paddington 2	Runner-Up
2018	Los Angeles Online Film Critics Society Awards	Best Visual Effects or Animated Performance	Paddington 2	Nominated
2019	Austin Film Critics Association	Best Motion Capture / Special Effects Performance	Paddington 2	Nominated
2019	Critics' Choice Television Awards	Best Supporting Actor in a Movie / Miniseries	A Very English Scandal	Won
2019	Critics' Choice Television Awards	Best Actor in a Movie / Miniseries	This Is Going to Hurt	Nominated

=== Miscellaneous awards ===
Year	Award	Category	Work	Result
2005	WhatsOnStage Awards	Best Actor in a Play	Hamlet	Nominated
2006	Bambi Awards	Film – National	Perfume: The Story of a Murderer	Won
2007	European Film Awards	Best Actor	Perfume: The Story of a Murderer	Nominated
2008	Crime Thriller Awards	Best Actor	Criminal Justice	Nominated
2009	Royal Television Society Awards	Best Actor	Criminal Justice	Won
2009	Broadcasting Press Guild Awards	Best Actor	Criminal Justice	Nominated
2013	CinEuphoria Awards	Best Supporting Actor – International Competition	Cloud Atlas	Nominated
2013	Broadcasting Press Guild Awards	Best Actor	The Hour	Nominated
2013	Dorian Awards	We're Wilde About You! Rising Star of the Year		Nominated
2014	BTVA Voice Acting Awards	Best Male Lead Vocal Performance In A Feature Film	Paddington	Nominated
2014	WhatsOnStage Awards	Best Actor in a Play	Peter and Alice	Nominated
2016	Theatre World Award		The Crucible	Won
2019	CinEuphoria Awards	Best Ensemble – International Competition	Mary Poppins Returns	Nominated
2019	Dorian Awards	TV Performance of the Year – Actor	A Very English Scandal	Nominated
2019	Satellite Awards	Best Supporting Actor – Series, Miniseries or Television Film	A Very English Scandal	Nominated
2021	Satellite Awards	Best Supporting Actor – Series, Miniseries or Television Film	Fargo	Nominated
2022	TV Choice Awards	Best Actor	This Is Going to Hurt	Nominated
2023	Broadcasting Press Guild Awards	Best Actor	This Is Going to Hurt	Won

=== Online awards ===
Year	Award	Category	Work	Result
2007	Online Film & Television Association	Best Breakthrough Performance: Male	Perfume: The Story of a Murderer	Nominated
2014	Online Film & Television Association	Best Actor in a Motion Picture or Miniseries	The Hollow Crown	Nominated

== See also ==
- List of British actors
- List of Royal National Theatre Company actors
- List of Royal Academy of Dramatic Art alumni
