= List of awards and nominations received by John Logan =

List of John Logan awards
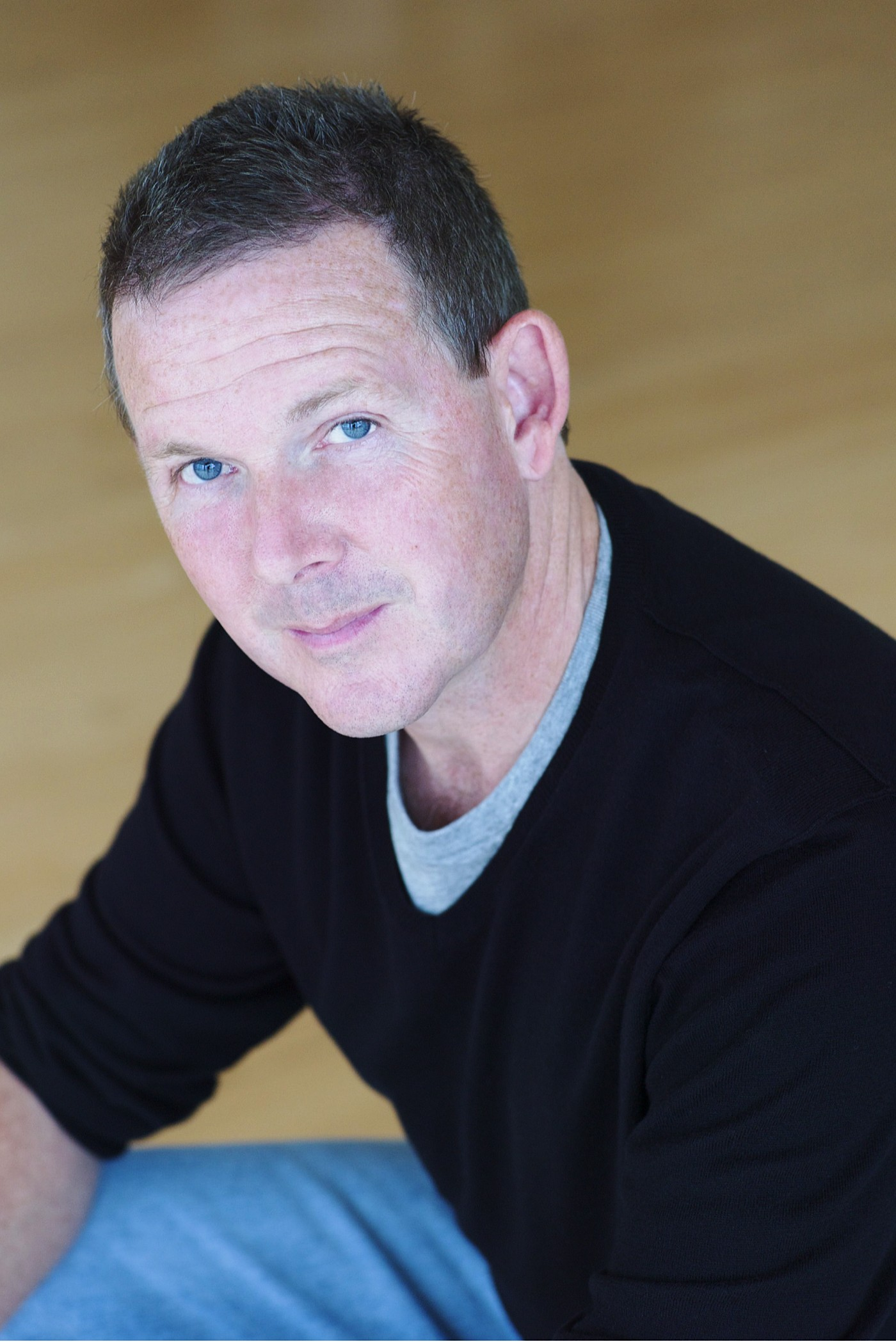
Award	Wins	Nominations
Academy Award	0	3
Emmy Award	0	1
Tony Award	1	2

John Logan is an American playwright, screenwriter, film producer, and television producer.

He is a three-time Academy Award nominee; twice for Best Original Screenplay for Gladiator (2000) and The Aviator (2004) and once for Best Adapted Screenplay for Hugo (2011). He is also a two time Tony Award nominee for Best Play for Red in 2010 and Best Book of a Musical for Moulin Rouge! in 2020. He also was nominated for a Primetime Emmy Award for Outstanding Writing for a Limited Series or Movie for RKO 281 in 2000.

He also has received nominations and wins from the British Academy Film Awards, Golden Globe Awards, Critics Choice Awards, and Writers Guild of America Awards.

== Major associations ==
=== Academy Awards ===
Year	Category	Nominated work	Result	Ref.
2000	Best Original Screenplay	Gladiator	Nominated	
2004	Best Original Screenplay	The Aviator	Nominated	
2011	Best Adapted Screenplay	Hugo	Nominated	

=== Primetime Emmy Awards ===
Year	Category	Nominated work	Result	Ref.
2000	Outstanding Writing for a Miniseries or a Movie	RKO 281	Nominated	

=== Tony Awards ===
Year	Category	Nominated work	Result	Ref.
2010	Best Play	Red	Won	
2020	Best Book of a Musical	Moulin Rouge!	Nominated	

== Industry awards ==
=== British Academy Film Awards ===
Year	Category	Nominated work	Result	Ref.
2000	Best Original Screenplay	Gladiator	Nominated	
2004	Best Original Screenplay	The Aviator	Nominated	
2012	Outstanding British Film	Skyfall	Won	

=== Golden Globe Awards ===
Year	Category	Nominated work	Result	Ref.
2004	Best Screenplay	The Aviator	Nominated	

=== Writers Guild of America Awards ===
Year	Category	Nominated work	Result	Ref.
2001	Adapted Long Form	RKO 281	Won	
2004	Best Original Screenplay	The Aviator	Nominated	
2011	Best Adapted Screenplay	Hugo	Nominated	

== Miscellaneous awards ==
Year	Award	Project	Result
2000	Las Vegas Film Critics Society Awards for Best Original Screenplay	Gladiator	Nominated
2004	Broadcast Film Critics Association for Best Writer	The Aviator	Nominated
2004	Satellite Award for Best Original Screenplay	The Aviator	Nominated
2011	Alliance of Women Film Journalists for Best Adapted Screenplay	Hugo	Nominated
2011	Broadcast Film Critics Association for Best Adapted Screenplay	Hugo	Nominated
2011	Chicago Film Critics Association for Best Adapted Screenplay	Hugo	Nominated
2011	Phoenix Film Critics Society for Best Adapted Screenplay	Hugo	Nominated
2011	San Diego Film Critics Society Award for Best Adapted Screenplay	Hugo	Nominated
2011	WAFCA for Best Adapted Screenplay	Hugo	Nominated
