= 64th Tony Awards =

2010 US theatrical awards ceremony

- 64th Tony Awards poster
- Date: June 13, 2010
- Location: Radio City Music Hall
- Hosted by: Sean Hayes

Highlights
- Most wins: Red (6)
- Most nominations: La Cage aux Folles and Fela! (11)
- Website: tonyawards.com

Television/radio coverage
- Network: CBS
- Viewership: 7.0 million
- Produced by: Ricky Kirshner; Glenn Weiss
- Directed by: Glenn Weiss

The 64th Annual Tony Awards took place on Sunday, June 13, 2010, held again at Radio City Music Hall in New York City. The host was Sean Hayes. These awards paid tribute to Broadway productions during the 2009–2010 season. The cut off-date for Tony eligibility was April 29, 2010, and the nominations were announced on May 4.

The play Red won 6 awards, including Best Play, most of the night.

The musical Memphis won four awards, including Best Musical.

Fences won three awards, including Best Revival of a Play.

La Cage aux Folles also won three awards, including Best Revival of a Musical.

The CBS television network broadcast the event, which was also simulcast live to the Clear Channel Spectacolor HD Screen in Times Square as well as on the official Tony Awards website.

The director of the telecast, Glenn Weiss, won the Directors Guild of America award for Outstanding Directorial Achievement in Musical Variety.

Among the highlights was presenter Kristin Chenoweth and Hayes poking fun at a recent Newsweek article questioning the openly gay Hayes' believability at playing heterosexual by passionately kissing.

== Eligibility ==
Shows that opened on Broadway during the 2009–10 season before April 30, 2010 are eligible.

Original plays

- After Miss Julie
- A Behanding in Spokane
- Collected Stories
- Enron
- In the Next Room (or The Vibrator Play)
- Looped
- Next Fall
- Oleanna
- Race
- Red
- A Steady Rain
- Superior Donuts
- Time Stands Still
- Wishful Drinking

Original musicals

- The Addams Family
- All About Me
- American Idiot
- Burn the Floor
- Come Fly Away
- Everyday Rapture
- Fela!
- Memphis
- Million Dollar Quartet
- Sondheim on Sondheim

Play revivals

- Brighton Beach Memoirs
- Fences
- Hamlet
- Lend Me a Tenor
- The Miracle Worker
- Present Laughter
- The Royal Family
- A View from the Bridge

Musical revivals

- Bye Bye Birdie
- Finian's Rainbow
- La Cage aux Folles
- A Little Night Music
- Promises, Promises
- Ragtime
- White Christmas

== Ceremony ==
=== Presenters ===
Presenters included:

- Paula Abdul
- Billie Joe Armstrong
- Antonio Banderas
- Justin Bartha
- Laura Benanti
- Cate Blanchett
- Patrick Breen
- Laura Bell Bundy
- Michael Cerveris
- Kristin Chenoweth
- Barbara Cook
- Michael Douglas
- Kelsey Grammer^{†}
- Rosemary Harris^{†}
- Patrick Heusinger
- Katie Holmes
- Brian d'Arcy James
- Scarlett Johansson^{†}
- Nathan Lane
- Angela Lansbury^{†}
- Anthony LaPaglia
- Laura Linney^{†}
- Lucy Liu
- Jan Maxwell^{†}
- Idina Menzel
- Lea Michele
- Alfred Molina^{†}
- Helen Mirren
- Matthew Morrison
- Chris Noth
- Bebe Neuwirth
- Bernadette Peters
- David Hyde Pierce^{‡}
- Daniel Radcliffe
- Eddie Redmayne^{†}
- Mark Sanchez
- Tony Shalhoub
- Liev Schreiber^{†}
- Jada Pinkett Smith
- Will Smith
- Stanley Tucci
- Denzel Washington^{†}
- Raquel Welch
† = 2010 nominee
‡ = 2010 Isabelle Stevenson Award winner

=== Performances ===
The show opened with a medley from most of the musicals that opened during the season, and included, as described by The New York Times, punk music, Frank Sinatra songs, Afrobeat rhythms, and early rock ’n’ roll.

There were performances by the casts of the musicals nominated for both Best Musical and Revival: American Idiot, Fela!, Memphis, Million Dollar Quartet, La Cage aux Folles, A Little Night Music, Everyday Rapture and Ragtime. Other performers were Lea Michele, who sang "Don't Rain On My Parade" and Matthew Morrison, who sang "All I Need Is the Girl", and punk rock band Green Day who performed "Know Your Enemy/Holiday". The casts of Come Fly Away and Promises, Promises were included in a presentation of choreography. Additionally, the nominees for Best Play and Best Play Revival were presented by the performers from their respective plays.

=== Creative Arts Tony Awards ===
Some of the Tony Awards, dubbed "The Creative Arts Tony Awards" were awarded prior to the CBS telecast. The presentation was shown on a live webcast. Hosts for this portion of the ceremony were Karen Olivo and Gregory Jbara. Awards presented at this special ceremony included Best Book of a Musical, Best Original Score, Best Orchestrations, Special Tony Awards and the eight design prizes.

== Ineligibility rulings ==
The Tony Administration Committee decided on April 30, 2010 that the scores of American Idiot and Fela! were ineligible for Tony Award nominations because fewer than 50% of their scores were written for the stage productions.

On May 14, 2010, the Tony Award committee announced a disqualification of a nomination in the "Best Costume Design in a Musical" category for Ragtime, stating that "...Santo Loquasto's designs for the revival of Ragtime are predominantly those from the original 1998 production, and therefore do not meet the Tony rule which states, work that 'substantially duplicate(s)' work from a prior production is ineligible."

== Competitive awards ==
Source: Tony Awards

Winners are listed first and highlighted in boldface.

Best Play	Best Musical
**Red – John Logan**; In the Next Room (or The Vibrator Play) – Sarah Ruhl; Next Fall – Geoffrey Nauffts; Time Stands Still – Donald Margulies	**Memphis**; American Idiot; Fela!; Million Dollar Quartet
Best Revival of a Play	Best Revival of a Musical
**Fences**; Lend Me a Tenor; The Royal Family; A View from the Bridge	**La Cage aux Folles**; Finian's Rainbow; A Little Night Music; Ragtime
Best Performance by a Leading Actor in a Play	Best Performance by a Leading Actress in a Play
**Denzel Washington – Fences as Troy Maxson**; Jude Law – Hamlet as Hamlet; Alfred Molina – Red as Mark Rothko; Liev Schreiber – A View from the Bridge as Eddie Carbone; Christopher Walken – A Behanding in Spokane as Carmichael	**Viola Davis – Fences as Rose Maxson**; Valerie Harper – Looped as Tallulah Bankhead; Linda Lavin – Collected Stories as Ruth Steiner; Laura Linney – Time Stands Still as Sarah Goodwin; Jan Maxwell – The Royal Family as Julie Cavendish
Best Performance by a Leading Actor in a Musical	Best Performance by a Leading Actress in a Musical
**Douglas Hodge – La Cage aux Folles as Albin**; Kelsey Grammer – La Cage aux Folles as Georges; Sean Hayes – Promises, Promises as Chuck Baxter; Chad Kimball – Memphis as Huey Calhoun; Sahr Ngaujah – Fela! as Fela Kuti	**Catherine Zeta-Jones – A Little Night Music as Desiree Armfeldt**; Kate Baldwin – Finian's Rainbow as Sharon McLonergan; Montego Glover – Memphis as Felicia Farrell; Christiane Noll – Ragtime as Mother; Sherie Rene Scott – Everyday Rapture as Herself
Best Performance by a Featured Actor in a Play	Best Performance by a Featured Actress in a Play
**Eddie Redmayne – Red as Ken**; David Alan Grier – Race as Henry Brown; Stephen McKinley Henderson – Fences as Jim Bono; Jon Michael Hill – Superior Donuts as Franco; Stephen Kunken – Enron as Andy Fastow	**Scarlett Johansson – A View from the Bridge as Catherine**; Maria Dizzia – In the Next Room (or The Vibrator Play) as Mrs. Daldry; Rosemary Harris – The Royal Family as Fanny Cavendish; Jessica Hecht – A View from the Bridge as Beatrice; Jan Maxwell – Lend Me a Tenor as Maria
Best Performance by a Featured Actor in a Musical	Best Performance by a Featured Actress in a Musical
**Levi Kreis – Million Dollar Quartet as Jerry Lee Lewis**; Kevin Chamberlin – The Addams Family as Uncle Fester; Robin de Jesús – La Cage aux Folles as Jacob; Christopher Fitzgerald – Finian's Rainbow as Og; Bobby Steggert – Ragtime as Younger Brother	**Katie Finneran – Promises, Promises as Marge MacDougall**; Barbara Cook – Sondheim on Sondheim as Various Characters; Angela Lansbury – A Little Night Music as Madame Armfeldt; Karine Plantadit – Come Fly Away as Kate; Lillias White – Fela! as Funmilayo Kuti
Best Direction of a Play	Best Direction of a Musical
**Michael Grandage – Red**; Sheryl Kaller – Next Fall; Kenny Leon – Fences; Gregory Mosher – A View from the Bridge	**Terry Johnson – La Cage aux Folles**; Christopher Ashley – Memphis; Marcia Milgrom Dodge – Ragtime; Bill T. Jones – Fela!
Best Book of a Musical	Best Original Score (Music and/or Lyrics) Written for the Theatre
**Joe DiPietro – Memphis**; Dick Scanlan and Sherie Rene Scott – Everyday Rapture; Jim Lewis and Bill T. Jones – Fela!; Colin Escott and Floyd Mutrux – Million Dollar Quartet	**Memphis – David Bryan (music and lyrics) and Joe DiPietro (lyrics)**; The Addams Family – Andrew Lippa (music and lyrics); Enron – Adam Cork (music) and Lucy Prebble (lyrics); Fences – Branford Marsalis (music)
Best Choreography	Best Orchestrations
**Bill T. Jones – Fela!**; Rob Ashford – Promises, Promises; Lynne Page – La Cage aux Folles; Twyla Tharp – Come Fly Away	**Daryl Waters and David Bryan – Memphis**; Jason Carr – La Cage aux Folles; Aaron Johnson – Fela!; Jonathan Tunick – Promises, Promises
Best Scenic Design of a Play	Best Scenic Design of a Musical
**Christopher Oram – Red**; John Lee Beatty – The Royal Family; Alexander Dodge – Present Laughter; Santo Loquasto – Fences	**Christine Jones – American Idiot**; Marina Draghici – Fela!; Derek McLane – Ragtime; Tim Shortall – La Cage aux Folles
Best Costume Design of a Play	Best Costume Design of a Musical
**Catherine Zuber – The Royal Family**; Martin Pakledinaz – Lend Me a Tenor; Constanza Romero – Fences; David Zinn – In the Next Room (or The Vibrator Play)	**Marina Draghici – Fela!**; Paul Tazewell – Memphis; Matthew Wright – La Cage aux Folles
Best Lighting Design of a Play	Best Lighting Design of a Musical
**Neil Austin – Red**; Neil Austin – Hamlet; Mark Henderson – Enron; Brian MacDevitt – Fences	**Kevin Adams – American Idiot**; Donald Holder – Ragtime; Nick Richings – La Cage aux Folles; Robert Wierzel – Fela!
Best Sound Design of a Play	Best Sound Design of a Musical
**Adam Cork – Red**; Acme Sound Partners – Fences; Adam Cork – Enron; Scott Lehrer – A View from the Bridge	**Robert Kaplowitz – Fela!**; Jonathan Deans – La Cage aux Folles; Dan Moses Schreier and Gareth Owen – A Little Night Music; Dan Moses Schreier – Sondheim on Sondheim

== In Memoriam ==
- Shirley Rich
- David Powers
- Douglas Watt
- Shelly Gross
- Lynn Redgrave
- Corin Redgrave
- Budd Schulberg
- Quentin Easter
- Rue McClanahan
- Max Eisen
- Larry Gelbart
- Dixie Carter
- George Martin
- Conard Fowkes
- Michael Frazier
- Torrie Zito
- Joseph Wiseman
- Michael Kuchwara
- Doris Eaton
- Morton Gottlieb
- Donal Donnelly
- John Kenley
- Zakes Mokae
- June Havoc
- Everett King
- Ron Konecky
- Gene Barry
- Pierre Cossette
- M. Edgar Rosenblum
- Claude Purdy
- Lena Horne

== Non-competitive awards ==
Most of the non-competitive awards were announced on April 21, 2010. They are:

- Lifetime Achievement in the Theatre to Sir Alan Ayckbourn and Marian Seldes.
- Isabelle Stevenson Award to David Hyde Pierce. Pierce is receiving the Isabelle Stevenson Award "for his work in the fight against Alzheimer's disease."
- Tony Honors for Excellence in Theatre to:
  - The Alliance of Resident Theatres New York.
  - B.H. Barry, who "pioneered the teaching of stage combat as part of the curriculum in US Drama Programs at the University and Graduate level."
  - Tom Viola, executive director of Broadway Cares/Equity Fights AIDS (BC/EFA).
  - The Midtown North and South New York City Police Precincts.
- The Regional Theatre Tony Award to The Eugene O'Neill Theater Center, Waterford, Connecticut.

== Summary of awards ==
The musical Fela! and the revival of La Cage aux Folles, each received eleven nominations, the most of any production, with each winning three awards. The musical Memphis won four awards, including Best Musical. The revival of Fences earned ten nominations, the most nominations ever received by a play revival, and won three awards. The new play Red received seven nominations and won six awards, the most of any play or musical this season.

Film actors won an unusual number of awards this season, with Denzel Washington, Scarlett Johansson, Viola Davis, Eddie Redmayne and Catherine Zeta-Jones among the winners. So many film actors appeared on Broadway last year that theatre actor Hunter Foster created a Facebook page called "Give the Tonys Back to Broadway". The New York Times critic Charles Isherwood wrote, "I share to a certain extent Mr. Foster’s dismay at this year’s star-glutted Tony awards. ... It’s possible that if the Tony administrators had not kicked the journalists out of the voting pool, there might have been a few more worthy winners." Isherwood called the proliferation of Hollywood stars on Broadway "ominous", claiming that projects from last season featuring film actors such as Jude Law's Hamlet and A Steady Rain monopolized the box office, causing "superior" plays to fail. On the other hand, Isherwood felt, it is possible that "welcoming [film] stars on Broadway – the talented ones, anyway – [could help] New York theater to reassert its importance to the culture, and maybe even to tilt the balance of the entertainment business at least a little back toward the East Coast".

== Multiple nominations and awards ==
These productions had multiple nominations:

- 11 nominations: Fela! & La Cage aux Folles
- 10 nominations: Fences
- 8 nominations: Memphis
- 7 nominations: Red
- 6 nominations: Ragtime & A View from the Bridge
- 5 nominations: The Royal Family
- 4 nominations: Enron, A Little Night Music & Promises, Promises
- 3 nominations: American Idiot, Finian's Rainbow, In the Next Room (or The Vibrator Play), Lend Me a Tenor & Million Dollar Quartet
- 2 nominations: The Addams Family, Come Fly Away, Everyday Rapture, Hamlet, Next Fall, Sondheim on Sondheim & Time Stands Still

The following productions received multiple awards.

- 6 wins: Red
- 4 wins: Memphis
- 3 wins: Fela!, Fences & La Cage aux Folles
- 2 wins: American Idiot

== See also ==
- Drama Desk Awards
- 2010 Laurence Olivier Awards – equivalent awards for West End theatre productions
- Obie Award
- New York Drama Critics' Circle
- Theatre World Award
- Lucille Lortel Awards
