= Michael Grandage =

British theatre director (born 1962)

Michael Grandage CBE
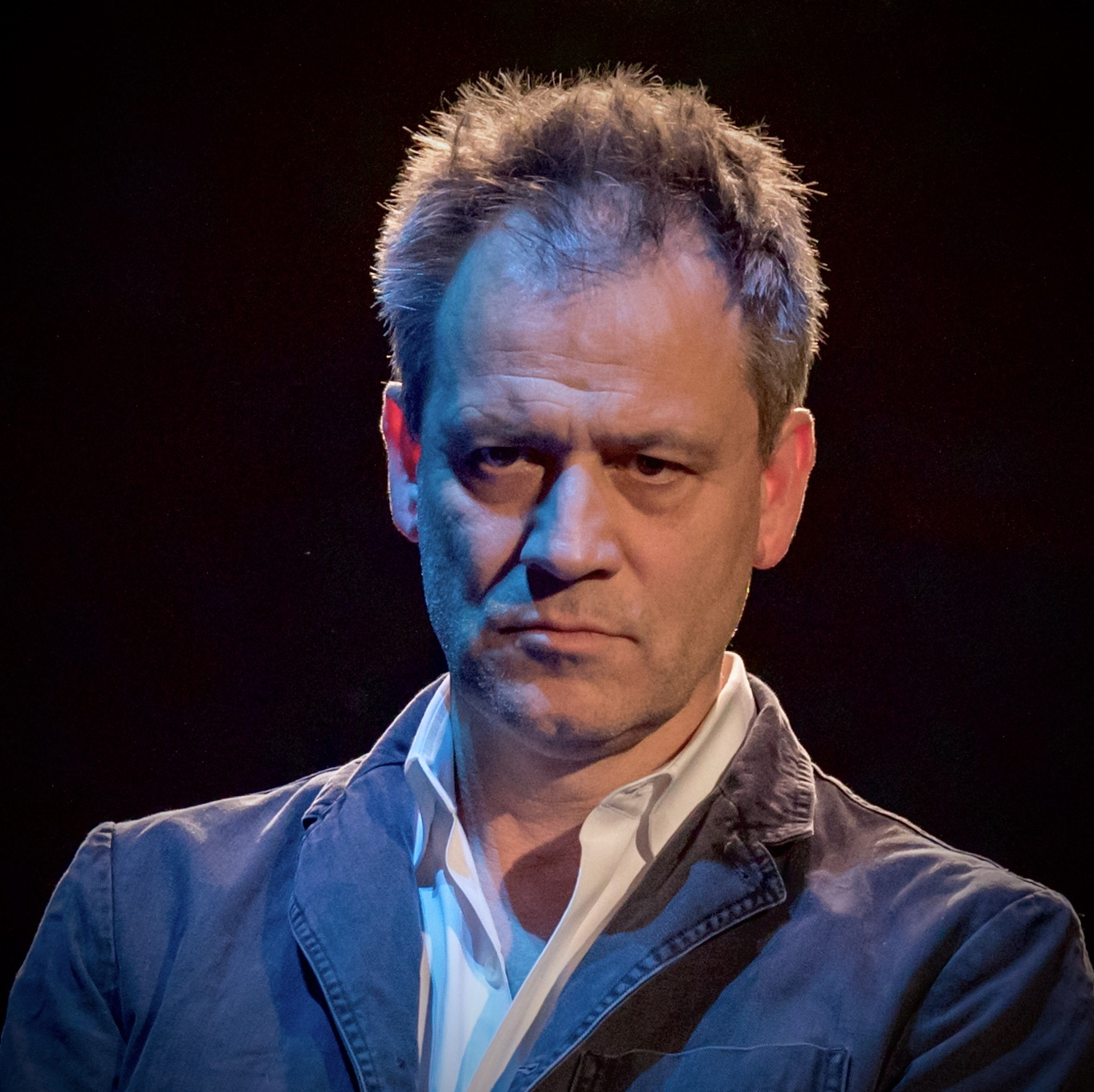
- Grandage in 2018
- Born: 2 May 1962 (age 64); Yorkshire, England
- Education: Royal Central School of Speech & Drama
- Occupations: Theatre director, producer
- Years active: 1996–present
- Partner: Christopher Oram

Michael Grandage CBE (born 2 May 1962) is a British theatre director and producer. He is currently artistic director of the Michael Grandage Company. From 2002 to 2012 he was artistic director of the Donmar Warehouse in London and from 2000 to 2005 he was artistic director of Sheffield Theatres.

== Early years ==
Grandage was born in Yorkshire, England, and raised in Penzance, Cornwall, where his parents ran a family business. He was educated at the Humphry Davy Grammar School before training as an actor at the Royal Central School of Speech & Drama through 1984. He spent twelve years working as an actor for companies such as the Royal Exchange and the Royal Shakespeare Company and was also a member of National Youth Theatre before turning to directing. He made his directorial debut in 1996 with a production of Arthur Miller's The Last Yankee at the Mercury Theatre, Colchester. In 1998 he was invited by Sheffield Theatres to direct Twelfth Night, his first Shakespeare production. In the same year he made his London directorial debut at the Almeida Theatre with a production of Shaw's The Doctor's Dilemma.

== Career ==
=== Sheffield Theatres ===
From 2000 to 2005 he was artistic director of Sheffield Theatres where his high-profile productions included Edward II with Joseph Fiennes, Richard III with Kenneth Branagh, Suddenly Last Summer with Diana Rigg and Victoria Hamilton, The Tempest with Derek Jacobi and Don Carlos with Derek Jacobi. He produced over forty plays with predominantly young directors and designers. He is credited with delivering consistently high quality work as well as bringing in new audiences and in 2001, Sheffield Theatres won the TMA Theatre of the Year.

=== Donmar Warehouse ===
From 2002 to 2012, he was artistic director of the Donmar Warehouse, where he succeeded Sam Mendes. During his tenure, he expanded the theatre's repertoire to include European work, touring productions and an extensive education programme, as well as taking the new Donmar brand to international audiences in America, Australia, Argentina and Europe.

In September 2008, he launched a one-year Donmar West End "access for all" season of four plays with affordable ticket prices when the company extended its repertory to the newly refurbished Wyndham's Theatre. Grandage directed all four productions: Kenneth Branagh in Ivanov, Derek Jacobi in Twelfth Night, Judi Dench in Madame de Sade and Jude Law in Hamlet.

In 2010, he launched a three-year West End season at the Trafalgar Studios to highlight the work of young directors who emerged from the Donmar's training scheme during his tenure.

During his decade at the Donmar, he produced sixty-six productions, directing twenty-five of them himself. His contributions to the Donmar included the purchase of the theatre site in Earlham Street, and the purchase of office and rehearsal space in nearby Dryden Street in 2011. These were made possible through commercial activity that Grandage engaged in on behalf of the Donmar during his tenure, particularly transferring productions to the West End and Broadway.

His work at the Donmar won Tony, Olivier, Evening Standard, Critics' Circle and South Bank Awards. He was first nominated for a Laurence Olivier Award in 2001 for Best Director for Peter Nichols' Passion Play at the Donmar Warehouse before winning in 2004 for David Greig's Caligula. Two of his musical productions for the Donmar have also won the Olivier Award for Outstanding Musical Production and a third won the Olivier Award for Best New Musical. He has won four Evening Standard Awards for his Donmar work including productions of Passion Play, Merrily We Roll Along, Grand Hotel, Ivanov, The Chalk Garden and Othello. In 2010, his production of Red by John Logan won six Tony Awards including Best Play and Best Director.

In June 2012, Constable & Robinson published A Decade At The Donmar by Michael Grandage, a photographic record of his tenure.

=== Opera ===
In 2010, Grandage started to work in opera, making his debut at Glyndebourne with a production of Billy Budd. This production has also played at the Brooklyn Academy of Music in New York City in 2014, and the San Francisco Opera in 2019. He returned to Glyndebourne in 2012 to direct Le nozze di Figaro, a production that was revived for the following ten years. In the US, his work has included new productions of Madama Butterfly and Don Giovanni for the Metropolitan Opera, Chicago Lyric Opera and Houston Grand Opera. His production of Billy Budd was revived again at Glyndebourne in 2026.

=== Michael Grandage Company (MGC) ===
At the end of 2011, Grandage set up the Michael Grandage Company to produce work in theatre, film and TV.

In June 2012 he announced a fifteen-month season of work at the Noël Coward Theatre in London's West End aimed at reaching out to a new generation of theatre-goers through pricing and access with over 100,000 seats going on sale at £10. James Bierman joined the company as Executive Producer.

Between December 2012 and February 2014, they produced Privates on Parade with Simon Russell Beale; John Logan's new play Peter and Alice with Judi Dench and Ben Whishaw; Daniel Radcliffe in The Cripple of Inishmaan by Martin McDonagh; and two plays by Shakespeare, A Midsummer Night's Dream with Sheridan Smith and David Walliams, followed by Henry V with Jude Law. Grandage directed all five productions and the season was nominated for six Olivier Awards.

In 2014, The Cripple of Inishmaan transferred to Broadway where it was nominated for six Tony Awards.

In 2015, the company returned to the West End with Photograph 51, a new play by Anna Ziegler starring Nicole Kidman. The production continued their commitment to greater access with twenty-five percent of every performance at £10. Kidman went on to win the Evening Standard Best Actress Award, as well as receiving an Olivier nomination for Best Actress.

Further theatre work in 2015/16 included a co-production with Emily Dobbs of Richard Greenberg's The Dazzle starring Andrew Scott and David Dawson, directed by Simon Evans at Found 111 and a co-production with Phil McIntyre of 30 Million Minutes, a one-woman show starring Dawn French, directed by Michael Grandage. This toured the UK and played in the West End twice, before being broadcast on BBC Four.

In 2016, MGC produced Eugene O'Neill's Hughie on Broadway starring Forest Whitaker. Following this, MGC expanded its activities while producer James Bierman left the company and producer Nick Frankfort joined alongside Stella McCabe as Executive. In addition to producing work in all media, MGC now offers a General Management service as well as looking after a select group of creative practitioners.

In 2017, the company produced Labour of Love, a new play by James Graham in a co-production with Headlong. Directed by Jeremy Herrin and starring Martin Freeman and Tamsin Greig, this critically acclaimed production went on to win the 2017 Olivier Award for Best New Comedy.

In 2018, they continued their commitment to quality work at affordable prices in the West End presenting Red by John Logan and The Lieutenant of Inishmore by Martin McDonagh – both directed by Grandage. Also in 2018, MGC announced a new film in development based on David Pitts' book Jack and Lem: The Untold Story of an Extraordinary Friendship.

In 2021, MGC produced Ian McDiarmid in The Lemon Table - a short story by Julian Barnes adapted for the stage and presented in a tour of the UK by Wiltshire Creative, Malvern Theatres, Sheffield Theatres and HOME.

In 2022, MGC produced Dawn French Is A Huge Twat, a one-woman show starring Dawn French that toured the UK from September and played The London Palladium before touring Australia and New Zealand in 2024. It was also filmed for the BBC.

In 2023 MGC produced Orlando from the novel by Virginia Woolf in a new adaptation by Neil Bartlett, starring Emma Corrin and directed by Michael Grandage at the Garrick Theatre.

In 2024 MGC produced Backstairs Billy, a new play by Marcelo Dos Santos starring Penelope Wilton and Luke Evans. It played a twelve week run at the Duke of York’s Theatre, directed by Michael Grandage and earning Dos Santos a Critics' Circle Award.

In 2025 MGC produced My Master Builder, a new play by Lila Raicek starring Ewan McGregor, Elizabeth Debicki and Kate Fleetwood. The production, directed by Grandage, played at the Wyndham’s Theatre from 17 April to 12 July.

=== Film ===
In 2016, MGC released their first feature film Genius, about the relationship between author Thomas Wolfe and his editor Max Perkins. The film, which was based on A. Scott Berg’s biography Max Perkins: Editor of Genius, had a screenplay by John Logan and was directed by Grandage. It starred Colin Firth, Jude Law, Nicole Kidman, Guy Pearce, Dominic West and Laura Linney and premiered at the Berlin Film Festival before a release on 16 June 2016 in the US.

In 2022, MGC produced its second film, My Policeman for Amazon Studios, alongside Berlanti/Schecter Films and Independent Film Company. This film was written by Ron Nyswaner, based on a book by Bethan Roberts and directed by Grandage. The cast includes Harry Styles, Emma Corrin, David Dawson, Gina McKee, Linus Roache and Rupert Everett. It received its world premiere at the Toronto International Film Festival and went on general release on 21 October 2022.

== Stage productions ==
Theatre (U.K.)

- 1996: The Last Yankee – Mercury Theatre, Colchester
- 1997: The Deep Blue Sea – Mercury Theatre, Colchester
- 1998: The Doctor's Dilemma – Almeida and national tour
- 1998: Twelfth Night – Sheffield
- 1998: What The Butler Saw – Sheffield
- 1999: The Jew of Malta – Almeida and national tour
- 1999: Good – Donmar
- 2000: The Country Wife – Sheffield
- 2000: Passion Play – Donmar
- 2000: As You Like It – Sheffield and Lyric Hammersmith
- 2000: Merrily We Roll Along – Donmar
- 2001: Don Juan – Sheffield
- 2001: Privates on Parade – Donmar
- 2001: Edward II – Sheffield
- 2002: The Tempest – Sheffield and Old Vic Theatre, London
- 2002: Richard III – Sheffield
- 2002: The Vortex – Donmar
- 2003: A Midsummer Night's Dream – Sheffield
- 2003: Caligula – Donmar
- 2003: After Miss Julie – Donmar
- 2004: Don Carlos – Sheffield & Gielgud Theatre, London
- 2004: Suddenly Last Summer – Sheffield and Noël Coward Theatre, London
- 2004: Pirandello's Henry IV – Donmar
- 2004: Grand Hotel – Donmar (after Vicky Baum's novel)
- 2005: The Wild Duck – Donmar
- 2005: Guys and Dolls – Piccadilly Theatre, London
- 2006: The Cut – Donmar
- 2006: Evita – Adelphi Theatre, London
- 2006: Frost/Nixon – Donmar and Gielgud Theatre, London
- 2006: Don Juan in Soho – Donmar
- 2007: John Gabriel Borkman – Donmar
- 2008: Twelfth Night – Donmar at Wyndham's
- 2008: Ivanov – Donmar at Wyndham's
- 2008: The Chalk Garden – Donmar
- 2008: Othello – Donmar
- 2009: Red – Donmar
- 2009: Hamlet – Donmar at Wyndham's
- 2009: Madame de Sade – Donmar at Wyndham's
- 2010: King Lear – Donmar
- 2010: Danton's Death – National Theatre
- 2011: Richard II – Donmar
- 2011: Luise Miller – Donmar
- 2013: Henry V – Noël Coward Theatre
- 2013: A Midsummer Night's Dream – Noël Coward Theatre
- 2013: The Cripple of Inishmaan – Noël Coward Theatre
- 2013: Peter and Alice – Noël Coward Theatre
- 2013: Privates on Parade – Noël Coward Theatre
- 2014: Dawn French: Thirty Million Minutes – UK Touring Production
- 2015: Photograph 51 – Noël Coward Theatre
- 2018: Red – Wyndham's Theatre
- 2018: The Lieutenant of Inishmore – Noël Coward Theatre
- 2022: Frozen – Theatre Royal Drury Lane
- 2023: Orlando – Garrick Theatre
- 2024: Backstairs Billy - The Duke of York's Theatre
- 2025: My Master Builder - Wyndham's Theatre
- 2025: The Line of Beauty - Almeida Theatre

Theatre (U.S.)

- 2006: Frost/Nixon – Bernard B. Jacobs Theatre, New York
- 2007: Frost/Nixon – National tour, U.S.
- 2009: Hamlet – Broadhurst Theatre, New York
- 2010: Red – John Golden Theatre, New York
- 2011: King Lear – Brooklyn Academy of Music, New York
- 2012: Evita – Marquis Theatre, New York
- 2012: Red – Mark Taper Forum, Los Angeles
- 2014: The Cripple of Inishmaan – Cort Theatre, New York
- 2016: Hughie – Booth Theatre, New York
- 2017: Frozen – Buell Theatre, Denver
- 2018: Frozen – St. James Theatre, New York

Opera

- 2010: Madama Butterfly – Houston Grand Opera
- 2010: Billy Budd – Glyndebourne
- 2011: Don Giovanni – Metropolitan Opera, New York
- 2012: Le nozze di Figaro – Glyndebourne
- 2014: Billy Budd – Brooklyn Academy of Music, New York

== Charity ==
In 2013, Grandage formed his charity MGCfutures, dedicated to supporting the work of young theatre makers and theatre audiences of the future. Initially, its educational work ran alongside the activities of MGC's work in the West End including the formation of a Youth Theatre. In 2014, when it acquired registered charity status, its reach became much wider. Since 2016 it has offered annual bursaries to young theatre makers including directors, producers, designers, writers, performers and all creative artists. In 2017 it piloted a new scheme, Theatregoers for Life, designed to encourage young people to start a meaningful relationship with live performance by supporting and encouraging independent theatre-going to regional theatres. In 2021, the bursary scheme celebrated its first five years with a record number of 33 recipients receiving over £118,000 to help the industry back to work following the Covid pandemic. By 2024, the scheme had awarded more than £500,000 to over 140 theatre makers. The charity's patrons include Dame Judi Dench, Dawn French, Nicole Kidman, Jude Law, Daniel Radcliffe, Aidan Turner, Dame Penelope Wilton, Luke Evans and Emma Corrin.

== Honours and appointments ==
Grandage was awarded the 2006 Award for Excellence in International Theatre by the International Theatre Institute.

He was appointed Commander of the Order of the British Empire (CBE) in the 2011 Birthday Honours for Services to Drama.

He has been awarded honorary doctorates by the University of London, Sheffield University, and Sheffield Hallam University. He has been given honorary fellowships by The Royal Central School of Speech and Drama, The Royal Welsh College of Music and Drama, and Falmouth University.

Grandage served as president of The Royal Central School of Speech and Drama from 2010 to 2022. As of November 2024 he is chair of the Josephine Hart Poetry Foundation and president of the Morrab Library in Cornwall (since 2018).

== Awards and nominations ==
Year	Award	Category	Nominee	Result
2000	Evening Standard Theatre Award	Best Director	Merrily We Roll Along, Passion Play and As You Like It	Won
2000	Critics' Circle Theatre Award	Best Director	Merrily We Roll Along, Passion Play and As You Like It	Won
2001	Laurence Olivier Award	Best Director	Passion Play	Nominated
2004	Laurence Olivier Award	Best Director	Caligula	Won
2005	Laurence Olivier Award	Best Director	Don Carlos	Nominated
2005	TMA Award	Best Director	Don Carlos	Won
2005	Evening Standard Theatre Award	Best Director	Don Carlos and Grand Hotel	Won
2005	Critics' Circle Theatre Award	Best Director	The Wild Duck	Won
2006	Evening Standard Theatre Award	Best Director	Evita, Don Juan in Soho and Frost/Nixon	Nominated
2007	Tony Award	Best Direction of a Play	Frost/Nixon	Nominated
2007	Drama Desk Award	Outstanding Director of a Play	Frost/Nixon	Nominated
2008	Evening Standard Theatre Award	Best Director	The Chalk Garden, Ivanov and Othello	Won
2008	WhatsOnStage Award	Best Director	The Chalk Garden, Ivanov and Othello	Won
2008	Critics' Circle Theatre Award	Best Director	The Chalk Garden and Ivanov	Won
2010	Tony Award	Best Direction of a Play	Red	Won
2010	Drama Desk Award	Outstanding Director of a Play	Red	Won
2010	Drama Desk Award	Outstanding Director of a Play	Hamlet	Nominated
2010	Laurence Olivier Award	Best Director	Hamlet	Nominated
2010	Critics' Circle Theatre Award	Best Director	King Lear	Won
2011	Laurence Olivier Award	Best Director	King Lear	Nominated
2011	Evening Standard Theatre Award	Editor's Award		Honouree
2014	Tony Award	Best Direction of a Play	The Cripple of Inishmaan	Nominated
2014	Outer Critics' Circle Award	Outstanding Director of a Play	The Cripple of Inishmaan	Nominated
2014	WhatsOnStage Award	Best Director	The Michael Grandage Season at the Noël Coward Theatre	Won
2019	WhatsOnStage Award	Equity Award for Services to Theatre		Honouree
2022	WhatsOnStage Award	Best Director	Frozen	Won

== Personal life ==
Michael Grandage has lived in London and Cornwall with his partner, the award-winning British Theatre designer Christopher Oram, since 1995. They entered a civil partnership in 2012.
