= Red (play) =

Play about artist Mark Rothko

- Original language: English
- Written by: John Logan
- Characters: Mark Rothko; Ken
- Genre: Drama
- Setting: Rothko's New York studio

Premiere
- Date: December 3, 2009
- Place: Donmar Warehouse, London

Red is a two-handed play by American writer John Logan about the artist Mark Rothko. It was first produced by the Donmar Warehouse, London, on December 8, 2009, in a production directed by Michael Grandage. It then transferred to Broadway in March 2010 with the same two leads, Alfred Molina and Eddie Redmayne, where it won 6 Tony Awards.

The play has subsequently been performed in many locations around the world, with a 2018 revival in London directed by Grandage, with Molina reprising his original role as Rothko.

== Synopsis ==
"There is only one thing I fear in life, my friend... One day the black will swallow the red."

Mark Rothko is in his New York studio in 1958/59, having been commissioned to paint a group of murals for the expensive and exclusive Four Seasons restaurant. He gives orders to his assistant, Ken, as Ken mixes the paints, makes the frames, and primes the canvases. Ken, however, eventually brashly questions Rothko's theories of art and his acceding to work on such a commercial project. For his part, Rothko dislikes the rise of pop art.

Ultimately, Rothko stops working on the project and decides to return the money. He explains to Ken that the Four Seasons is an inappropriate place for his murals to be seen. He then fires Ken and tells him to go make something of his own in the art world.

== Original production ==
The original production at the Donmar Warehouse, premiering on December 8, 2009, was directed by Michael Grandage and performed by Alfred Molina as Rothko and Eddie Redmayne as his fictional assistant Ken.

The production, with its two leads, transferred to Broadway at the John Golden Theatre for a limited engagement which began on March 11, 2010, and closed on June 27.

=== Reception ===
Reviews for the London production were mixed for the play but positive for Molina's performance. Michael Billington in The Guardian wrote: "Alfred Molina, with his large frame and beetling eyebrows, has exactly the fierce intensity of an artist whose paintings were a dynamic battle between Apollo and Dionysus".

In reviewing the Broadway production, Michael Kuchwara of the Associated Press wrote: "They are the tantalizing first words of Red, John Logan's engrossing, often enthralling new play about art, an artist and the act of creation." Those first words were "What do you see?" Variety wrote that "Alfred Molina is majestic".

=== Awards and nominations ===
The Broadway production won the 2010 Drama League Award for Distinguished Production of a Play and Molina won the Distinguished Performance Award.

It won the most awards at the 2010 Tonys, including Best Play for Logan and Best Performance by a Featured Actor in a Play for Redmayne. The production was nominated for a total of seven Tony Awards, winning six, including: Best Play, Best Featured Actor in a Play for Eddie Redmayne, Best Direction of a Play for Michael Grandage, Best Scenic Design of a Play for Christopher Oram, Best Lighting Design of a Play for Neil Austin, and Best Sound Design of a Play for Adam Cork. In addition, Alfred Molina was nominated for the Tony Award for Best Actor in a Play for his role as Mark Rothko. All in all, it received the most wins out of any other production that season. The play also won the Drama Desk Award for Outstanding Play while Grandage and Austin were honoured with Drama Desk Awards for their work. Molina, Cork and Oram were also similarly nominated.

== Other productions ==
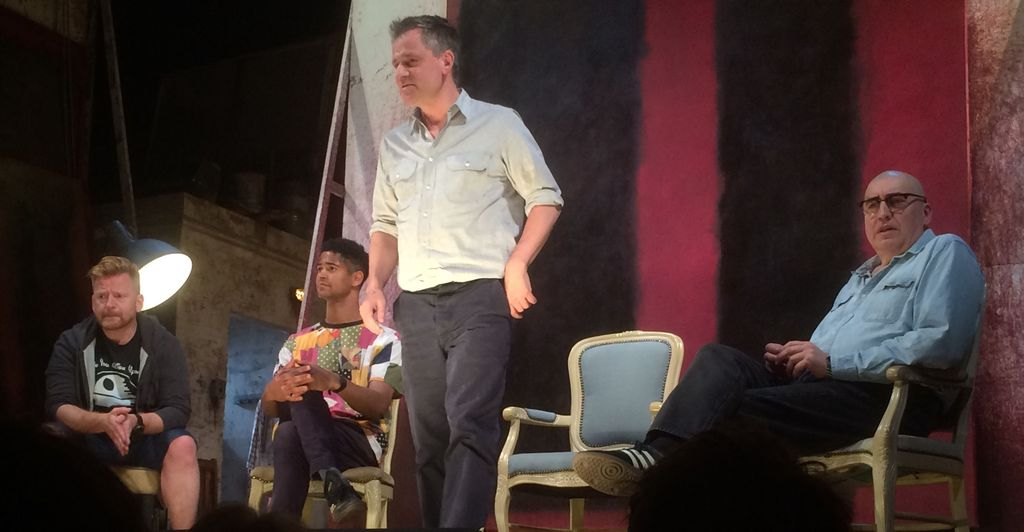
Christopher Oram, Alfred Enoch, Michael Grandage, Alfred Molina on the set of Red at Wyndham's Theatre, 2018

The third production of Red was – at Logan's insistence – put on by the South Australian amateur theatre company Independent Theatre in 2011, at The Space, in Adelaide's Festival Centre. David Roach (who also designed the set) played Rothko, and Paul-William Mawhinney took the role of Ken. The play received good reviews.

There was also a production in 2011 by Canstage in Toronto.

In August and September 2012, Molina reprised his role in Los Angeles, California opposite Jonathan Groff at the Mark Taper Forum. In March 2013, Groff and Molina reunited to perform the piece in collaboration with L.A. Theatre Works.

Red was staged in the Philippines February to March 2013 starring Bart Guingona as Mark Rothko, and Joaquin Valdez as Ken. This was produced by The Necessary Theater. Ten years later, they restaged the play with Guingona reprising his role as Rothko and UP Diliman Alum, JC Santos, taking the role of Ken.

Red played in the Pit at the New National Theatre Tokyo from August to October 2015, starring Tetsushi Tanaka as Rothko and Shun Oguri as Ken, directed by Eriko Ogawa.

The play was revived from May to July 2018 at the Wyndham's Theatre in London's West End directed by Michael Grandage, with Alfred Enoch as Ken, and Alfred Molina reprising his original role as Rothko. From this production, a film was made for the PBS series Great Performances in the US and aired November 15, 2019.

== Works referenced in the play ==
The play references other works of art, including:

- The Birth of Tragedy by Friedrich Nietzsche.
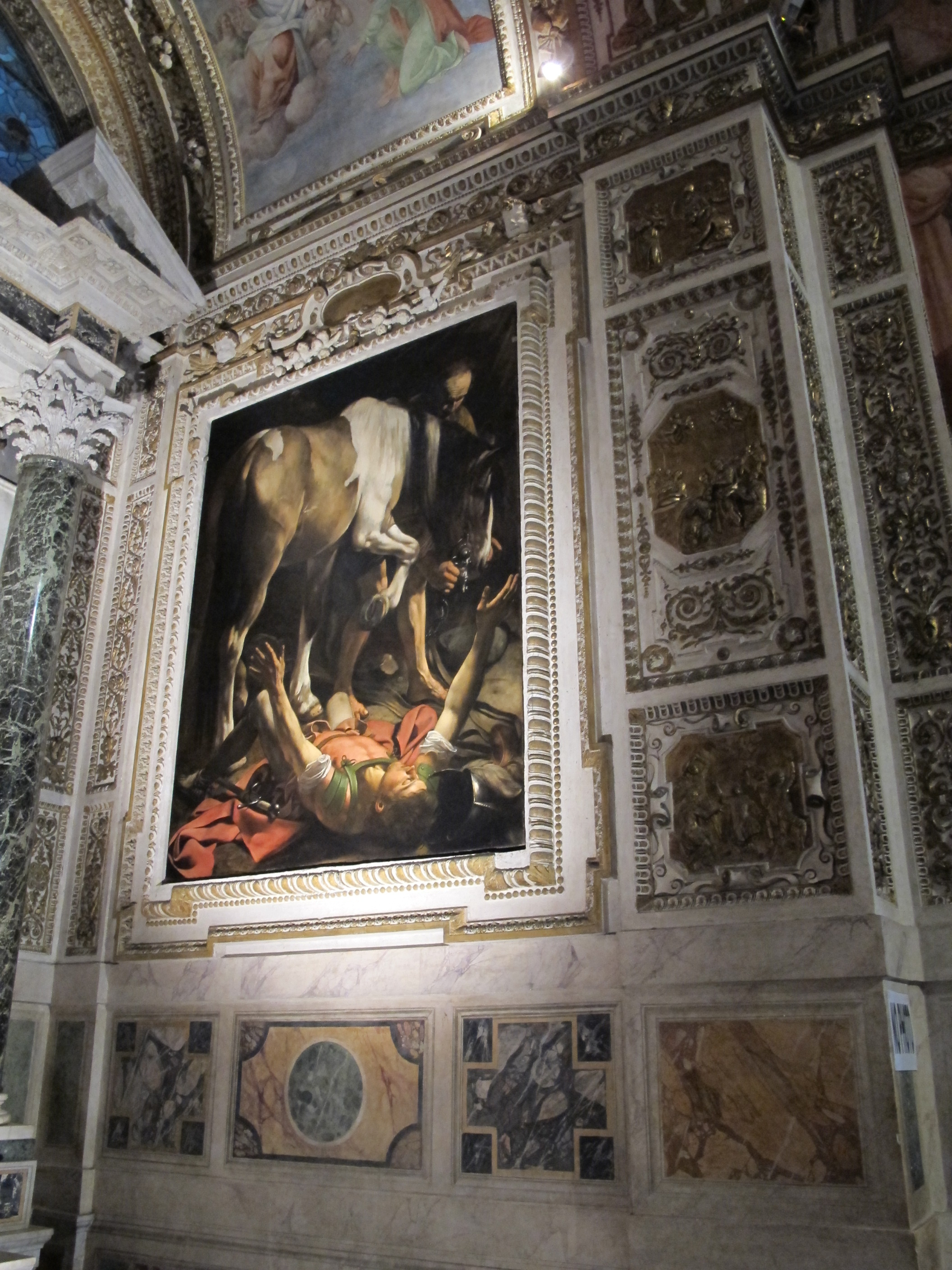
Conversion on the Way to Damascus by Caravaggio (Note: "I go to the Santa Maria del Popolo to see Caravaggio’s ’Conversion of Saul,’ which turns out is tucked away in a dark corner of this dark church with no natural light. It’s like a cave. But the painting glowed!".)

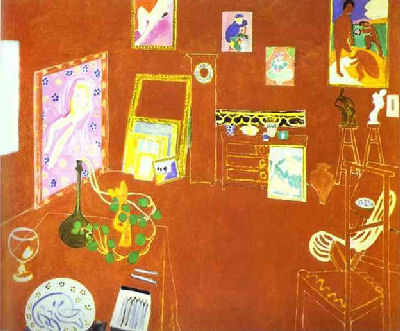
The Red Studio by Matisse

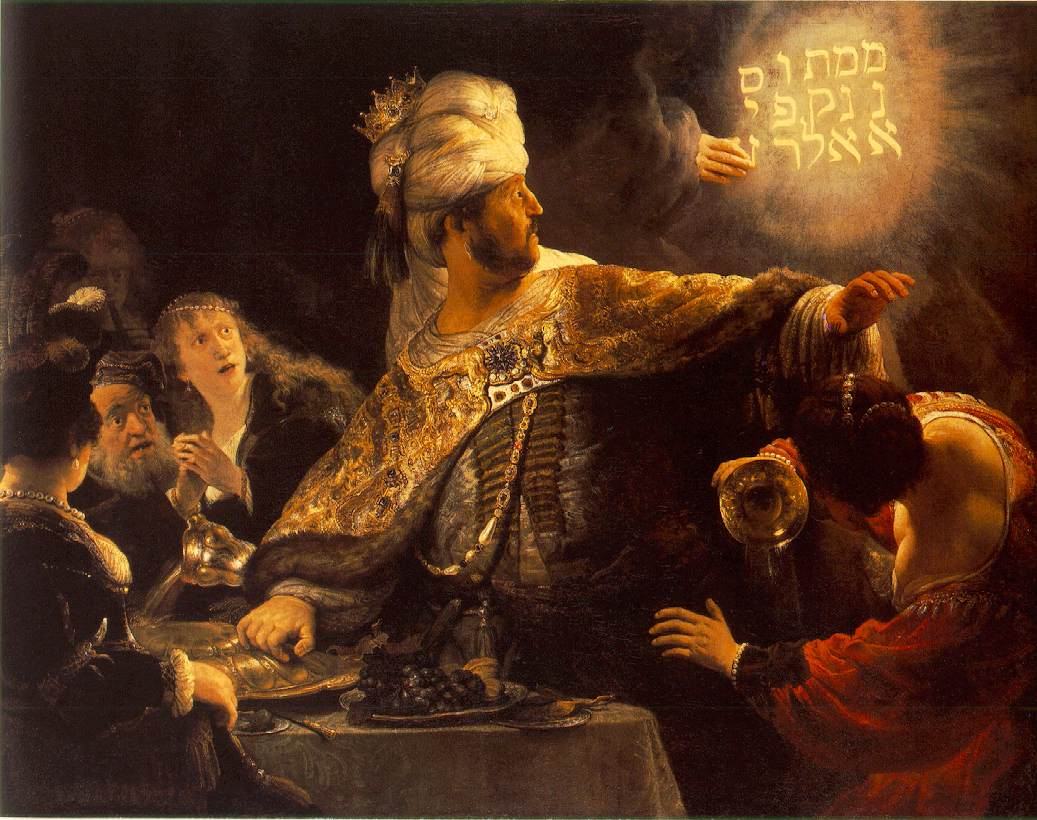
Belshazzar's Feast by Rembrandt.

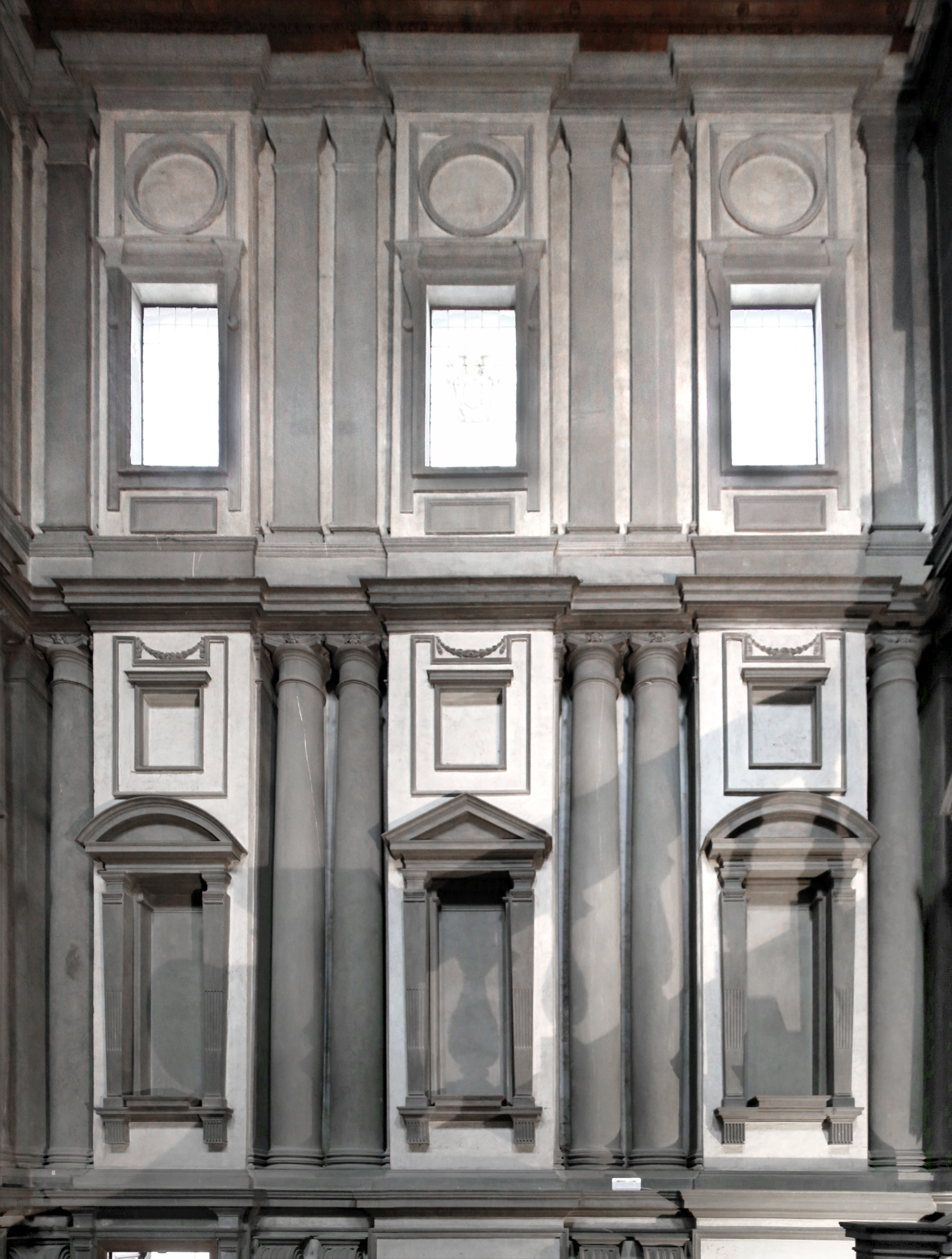
The vestibule of the Laurentian Library by Michelangelo.

== Awards and nominations ==
=== Original London production ===
Year	Award ceremony	Category	Nominee	Result
2010	Laurence Olivier Awards	Best New Play		Nominated
2010	Laurence Olivier Awards	Best Actor in a Supporting Role	Eddie Redmayne	Won
2010	Laurence Olivier Awards	Best Set Design	Christopher Oram	Nominated

=== Original Broadway production ===
Year	Award ceremony	Category	Nominee	Result
2010	Tony Awards	Best Play		Won
2010	Tony Awards	Best Performance by a Leading Actor in a Play	Alfred Molina	Nominated
2010	Tony Awards	Best Performance by a Featured Actor in a Play	Eddie Redmayne	Won
2010	Tony Awards	Best Direction of a Play	Michael Grandage	Won
2010	Tony Awards	Best Scenic Design of a Play	Christopher Oram	Won
2010	Tony Awards	Best Lighting Design of a Play	Neil Austin	Won
2010	Tony Awards	Best Sound Design of a Play	Adam Cork	Won
2010	Drama Desk Awards	Outstanding Actor in a Play	Eddie Redmayne	Nominated
2010	Drama Desk Awards	Outstanding Actor in a Play	Alfred Molina	Nominated
2010	Drama League Awards	Distinguished Performance	Alfred Molina	Won
2010	Drama League Awards	Distinguished Performance	Eddie Redmayne	Nominated
2010	Theatre World Award		Eddie Redmayne	Won
