= Ben Whishaw =

English actor (born 1980)

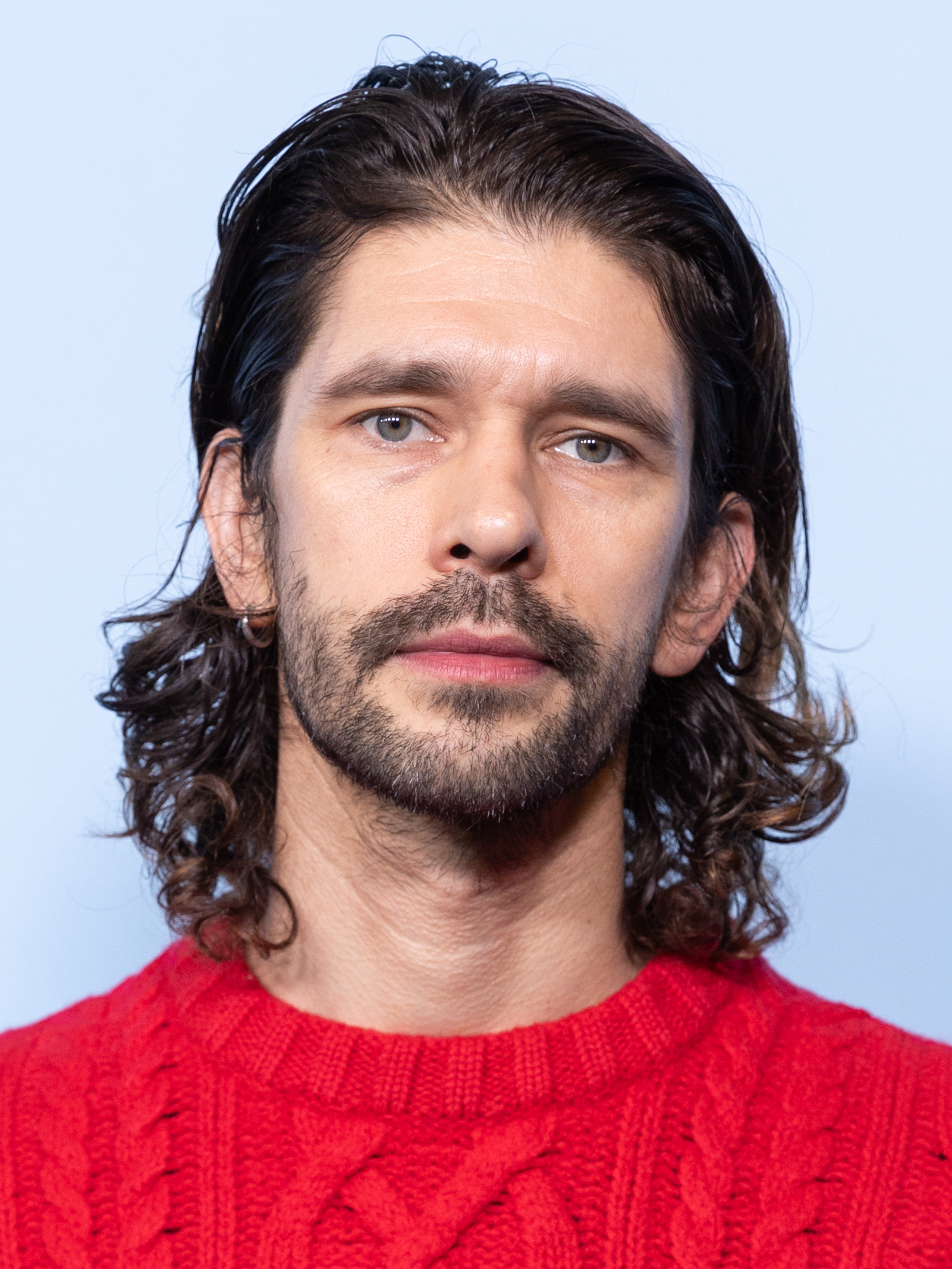
- Whishaw in 2025
- Born: Benjamin John Whishaw; 14 October 1980 (age 46); Clifton, Bedfordshire, England
- Education: Royal Academy of Dramatic Art
- Occupation: Actor
- Years active: 1999–present
- Partner: Mark Bradshaw (2012–2022)
- Awards: Full list

Benjamin John Whishaw (born 14 October 1980) is an English actor. He is best known for roles in TV series The Hour (2011–12), This Is Going to Hurt (2022), and the Netflix spy thriller series Black Doves (2024–present). He played Q in the James Bond films Skyfall (2012), Spectre (2015), and No Time to Die (2021). For his portrayal of Norman Scott in the miniseries A Very English Scandal (2018) he won a BAFTA, a Golden Globe Award and a Primetime Emmy Award for Best Supporting Actor.

Beginning his career in the 2000s, he played the title role in a 2004 production of the play Hamlet. This was followed by television roles in Nathan Barley (2005), Criminal Justice (2008); and film roles in Perfume: The Story of a Murderer (2006), I'm Not There (2007), Brideshead Revisited (2008), and Bright Star (2009). In 2012, Whishaw played the title role in a BBC Two adaptation of Richard II, for which he won the British Academy Television Award for Best Actor. He has voiced Paddington Bear in several projects since the 2014 animated feature film Paddington. His other film roles in the 2010s include Cloud Atlas (2012), The Lobster (2015), Suffragette (2015), The Danish Girl (2015), and Mary Poppins Returns (2018). Whishaw had a leading role in London Spy (2015). In 2020, he had a leading role in the fourth season of the black comedy drama Fargo.

He has received many accolades, including three British Academy Television Awards, two Emmy Awards, and a Golden Globe Award, in addition to nominations for a British Academy Film Award and two Laurence Olivier Awards.

== Early life and education ==
Benjamin John Whishaw was born on 14 October 1980 in Clifton, Bedfordshire, and was brought up there and in neighbouring Langford. He is the son of Linda (née Hope), who works in cosmetics, and Jose Whishaw, who works in sports with young people and played football for Stevenage Athletic. He has a fraternal twin brother.

His mother is of English ancestry and his father is of French, German, and Russian descent. Whishaw's paternal grandfather was born Jean Vladimir Stellmacher in Istanbul, Turkey, in 1922, to a Russian mother and German father, who was stationed there. The couple moved to Kassel, Germany, where Stellmacher grew up and was educated. Through a connection of his tutor, Stellmacher met with a contact at the British embassy and was recruited to serve as a British spy while serving in the German army. He changed his name to John Victor Whishaw during World War II after joining the British in Cairo, Egypt. He entered England in 1947 after being discharged, and married Olga, a woman he had met in France. They made new lives in the UK, and their children included Whishaw's father and a daughter, Ingrid. They did not know about their father's wartime experiences until shortly before John's death in 1994, when their mother Olga told them. Ingrid took back the surname of Stellmacher. Whishaw (and his father) kept the adopted name his grandfather chose.

Whishaw was a member of the Bancroft Players Youth Theatre, at Hitchin's Queen Mother Theatre. He attended Henlow Middle School, followed by Samuel Whitbread Community College in Clifton.

He graduated from the Royal Academy of Dramatic Art with a BA in Acting (H Level) in 2003.

== Career ==
Whishaw was involved in many productions with Big Spirit Youth Theatre, including If This Is a Man (also performed as The Drowned & The Saved), a piece devised by the company based on the book of the same name by Primo Levi, an Italian chemist, writer and survivor as a young man of Auschwitz concentration camp. It was adapted as a physical theatre piece by the group and taken to the 1995 Edinburgh Festival, where it garnered five-star reviews and great critical acclaim.

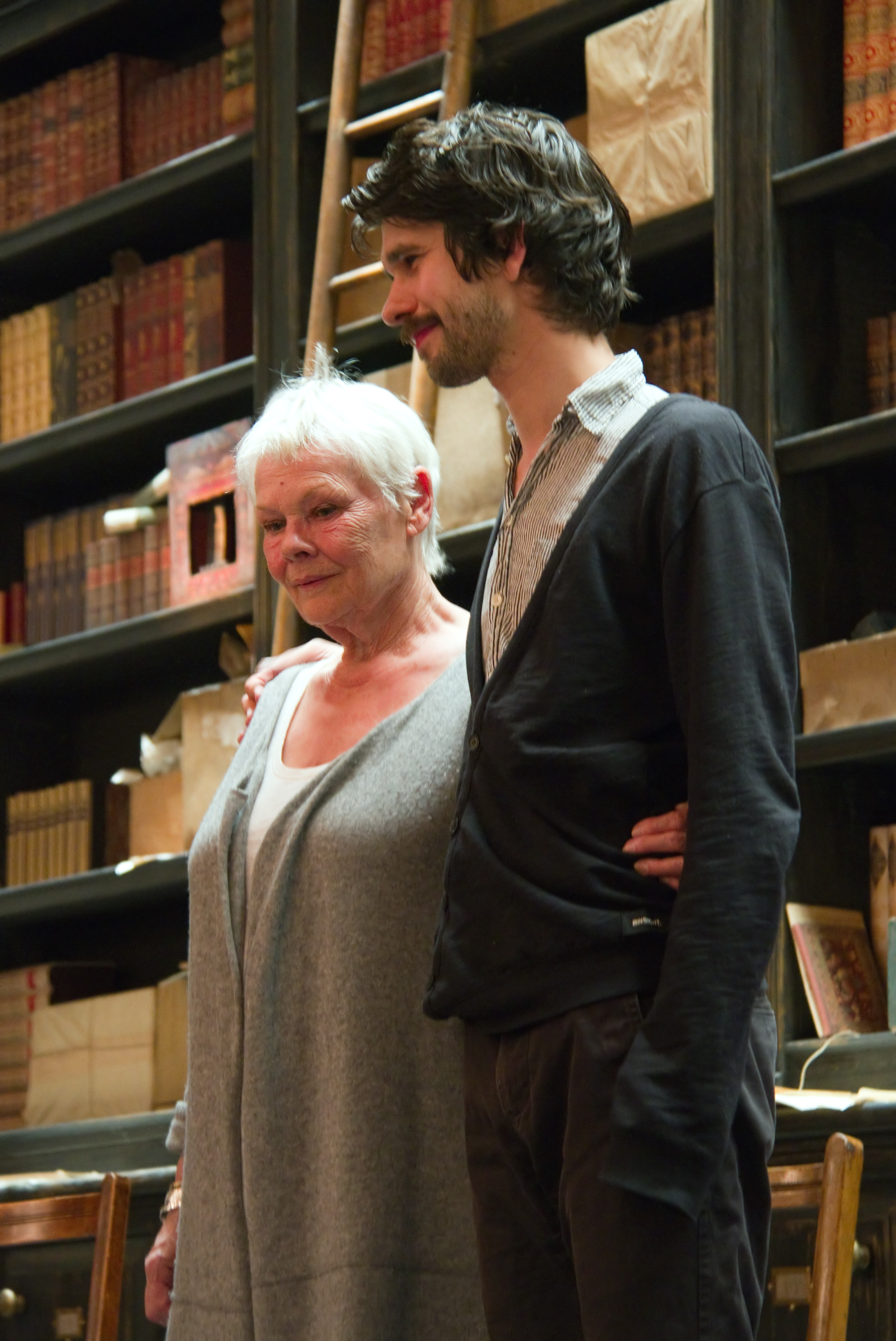
Whishaw with Judi Dench in Peter and Alice, at the Noël Coward Theatre in 2013

As the lead in Trevor Nunn's 2004 production of Hamlet at the Old Vic, Whishaw received highly favourable reviews, was nominated for the Olivier Award for Best Actor and received third prize at the Ian Charleson Awards. The role was shared with Al Weaver in an unusual arrangement. Whishaw played all nights except for Mondays and matinées. Nunn is reported to have made this arrangement due to the youth of the two actors playing the lead, to relieve some of the pressure on each.

His film and television credits include Layer Cake and Chris Morris's 2005 sitcom Nathan Barley, in which he played a character called Pingu. He was named "Most Promising Newcomer" at the 2001 British Independent Film Awards for My Brother Tom. In 2005 he was nominated as best actor in four award programs for his portrayal of Hamlet. He also played Keith Richards in the Brian Jones biopic Stoned. In the spring of 2005, Whishaw received much attention for his role as a drug dealer in the world premiere of Philip Ridley's controversial stage play Mercury Fur.

In the film Perfume (2006), Whishaw played Jean-Baptiste Grenouille, a perfume maker whose craft turns deadly. The film was released in Germany in September 2006 and in the United States in December 2006. In the same year, Whishaw worked on Paweł Pawlikowski's abandoned The Restraint of Beasts.

Whishaw appeared as one of the Bob Dylan reincarnations in the film I'm Not There in 2007, in the BBC's series Criminal Justice in 2008, in a new film adaptation of Brideshead Revisited, and in a stage adaptation of The Idiot at the National Theatre called ...some trace of her.

At the end of 2009, he starred in Cock, a new play by Mike Bartlett at the Royal Court Theatre, about a gay man who falls in love with a woman. In 2009 he also starred as the poet John Keats in the film Bright Star. In February 2010, Whishaw made a successful off-Broadway debut at MCC Theater in the American premiere of the awarding-winning play The Pride by Alexi Kaye Campbell. He played Ariel in Julie Taymor's 2010 film adaptation of The Tempest, and was featured in The Hour (2011), a BBC Two drama series.

In 2012, Whishaw appeared as Richard II in the television film Richard II, a part of the BBC Two series The Hollow Crown. He received the British Academy Television Award for Leading Actor. Also in 2012, he appeared as part of the ensemble cast of the science-fiction drama film Cloud Atlas, adapted from the novel of the same name by David Mitchell.

Whishaw appeared in the 23rd James Bond film, Skyfall, in the role of Q. He portrayed a younger Q than portrayed in previous films; Peter Burton and Desmond Llewelyn both received the role when they were in their forties, while Llewelyn and John Cleese played the role into their eighties and sixties, respectively. In addition, he was teamed a fourth time with Daniel Craig after they starred in the films The Trench, Enduring Love, and Layer Cake.

In spring 2013, Whishaw starred on stage alongside Judi Dench in the world premiere of Peter and Alice, a new play by John Logan, inspired by the lives of Alice Liddell and Peter Llewelyn Davies. From October 2013 to February 2014, Whishaw appeared on stage in the revival of Jez Butterworth's play Mojo, also starring Rupert Grint, Brendan Coyle, Daniel Mays and Colin Morgan. He was nominated for a WhatsOnStage Award for Best Actor for both roles. In the summer of 2015 he appeared as Dionysos in Euripides' tragedy Bakkhai at the Almeida Theatre in London.

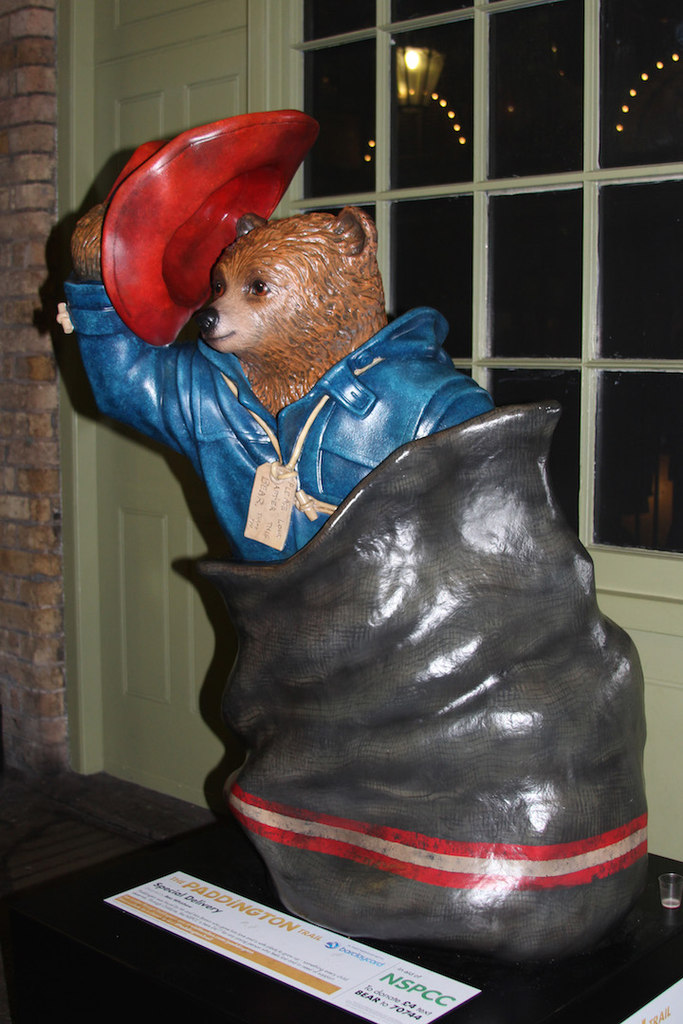
Whishaw's Paddington Bear designed statue—"Special Delivery"—in Covent Garden, London, auctioned to raise funds for the NSPCC

In 2014, Whishaw starred in the independent film Lilting, as well as voicing Paddington Bear in the film Paddington. In 2015, Whishaw co-starred in The Lobster, a romantic science fiction drama from Greek director Yorgos Lanthimos; appeared in Suffragette, a story of the early feminist movement written by Abi Morgan and also starring Carey Mulligan, Helena Bonham Carter, Meryl Streep and his The Hour co-star, Romola Garai; reprised his role of Q in Spectre, the 24th Bond film; and played author Herman Melville in Ron Howard's In the Heart of the Sea.

In 2017, Whishaw reprised his role as Paddington Bear in Paddington 2. In 2018, he portrayed Norman Scott in the BBC One miniseries A Very English Scandal, opposite Hugh Grant as parliamentarian Jeremy Thorpe, and also starred as Michael Banks in Mary Poppins Returns. In 2020, Whishaw had a lead role in the fourth season of the critically acclaimed FX black comedy crime drama Fargo, portraying Patrick "Rabbi" Milligan, alongside Chris Rock, Jason Schwartzman, Jessie Buckley and Jack Huston.

Whishaw reprised his role of Q in No Time to Die (2021), the 25th James Bond film. As of 2022, Whishaw stars in the BBC and AMC medical drama This Is Going to Hurt, an adaptation of comedian Adam Kay's memoir recalling his time in 2006 as a junior NHS doctor. Whishaw is also credited as an executive producer. Whishaw appeared in Sarah Polley's Women Talking, the film adaptation of Miriam Toews' novel of the same name, for which he was nominated for several acting awards for his performance. In 2023, he appeared in Passages, for which he received a nomination for Best Supporting Performance at the 39th Film Independent Spirit Awards.

He portrayed Russian writer and ultranationalist Eduard Limonov in the biopic Limonov: The Ballad (2024), directed by Kirill Serebrennikov; filming commenced in Moscow in 2021 but was halted by the Russian invasion of Ukraine. In late 2024, he starred with Keira Knightley in the Netflix spy thriller Black Doves, and headlined the West End revival of Waiting for Godot at the Theatre Royal Haymarket alongside Lucian Msamati.

In 2025, Whishaw was nominated for the Olivier Award for Best Actor in a Supporting Role for his performance in Bluets.

== Personal life ==
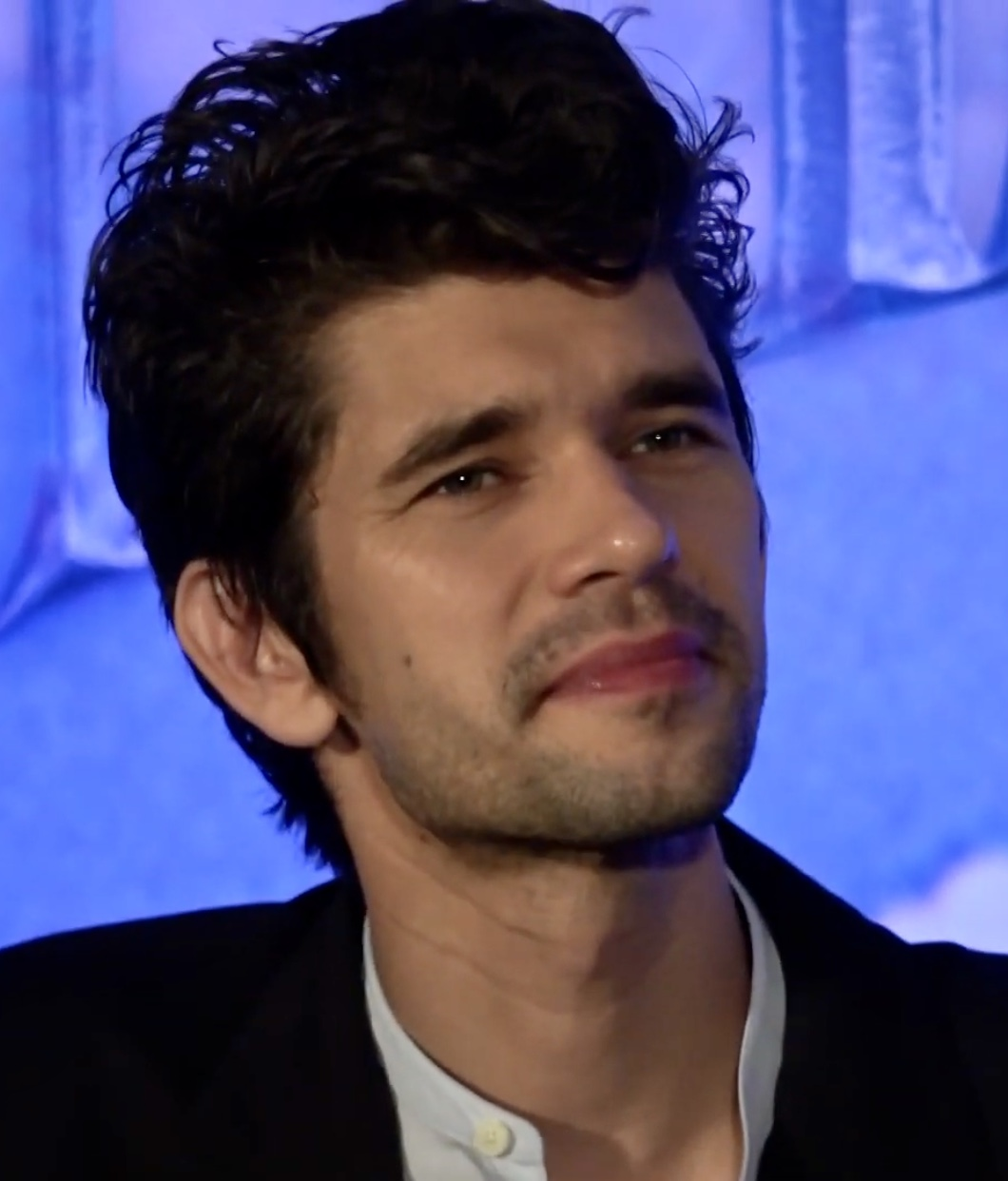
Whishaw in 2018

For several years, Whishaw refused to answer questions about his personal life, saying: "For me, it's important to keep a level of anonymity. As an actor, your job is to persuade people that you're someone else. So if you're constantly telling people about yourself, I think you're shooting yourself in the foot." In 2011, he told Out magazine: "As an actor you have total rights to privacy and mystery, whatever your sexuality, whatever you do. I don't see why that has to be something you discuss openly because you do something in the public eye. I have no understanding of why we turn actors into celebrities."

In August 2012, Whishaw entered into a civil partnership with Australian composer Mark Bradshaw, whom he had met in 2009. In 2014, he publicly discussed his coming out, saying that it was a tense experience for him but "everyone was surprisingly lovely". He split from Bradshaw in 2022.

== Acting credits ==
=== Film ===
Key
†	Denotes films that have not yet been released

Year	Title	Role	Notes
1999	The Trench	Pte. James Deamis	
1999	The Escort	Jay	French film (Mauvaise Passe)
2001	Baby	Little Joe	Short film
2001	My Brother Tom	Tom	
2002	Spiritual Rampage		Short film
2003	Ready When You Are Mr. McGill	Bruno	
2003	The Booze Cruise	Daniel	
2004	77 Beds	Ishmael	Short film
2004	Enduring Love	Spud	
2004	Layer Cake	Sidney	
2005	Stoned	Keith Richards	
2006	Perfume: The Story of a Murderer	Jean-Baptiste Grenouille	
2007	I'm Not There	Arthur	
2008	Brideshead Revisited	Sebastian Flyte	
2009	The International	Rene Antall	
2009	Bright Star	John Keats	
2009	Love Hate	Tom	Short film
2010	The Tempest	Ariel	
2011	The Prodigies	Gil Yepes	Irish and UK dub
2012	Skyfall	Q	
2012	Cloud Atlas	Cabin Boy / Robert Frobisher / Store Clerk / Georgette / Tribesman	
2013	Beat	Unknown	Short film
2013	The Zero Theorem	Doctor 3	
2013	Teenage	British Boy (voice)	Documentary
2013	Days and Nights	Eric	
2014	Lilting	Richard	
2014	Paddington	Paddington Bear	Voice and Facial Motion Capture
2015	The Muse	Edward Dunstan	Short film
2015	The Lobster	Limping Man	
2015	Unity	Narrator (voice)	Documentary
2015	Suffragette	Sonny	
2015	The Danish Girl	Henrik	
2015	Spectre	Q	
2015	In the Heart of the Sea	Herman Melville	
2016	A Hologram for the King	Dave	
2017	Paddington 2	Paddington Bear	Voice
2017	Family Happiness		Short film
2018	National Theatre Live: Julius Caesar	Brutus	
2018	Palo Santo	Palo Santo Hologram	Short film
2018	Mary Poppins Returns	Michael Banks	
2019	Little Joe	Chris	
2019	The Personal History of David Copperfield	Uriah Heep	
2020	Surge	Joseph	
2021	No Time to Die	Q	
2022	Women Talking	August Epp	
2023	Bad Behaviour	Elon Bello	
2023	Passages	Martin	French production
2023	Good Boy	Danny	Short film
2024	Limonov: The Ballad	Eduard Limonov	
2024	Paddington in Peru	Paddington Bear	Voice
2025	Peter Hujar's Day	Peter Hujar	
2028	Elden Ring †	TBA	Post-production

=== Television ===
Key
†	Denotes television productions that have not yet been released

Year	Title	Role	Notes
2000	Black Cab	Ryan	Episode: "Work"
2000	Other People's Children	Sully	4 episodes
2005	Nathan Barley	Pingu	6 episodes
2008	Criminal Justice	Ben Coulter	5 episodes
2011–2012	The Hour	Freddie Lyon	12 episodes
2012	Richard II	Richard II of England	First part of The Hollow Crown
2014	Playhouse Presents	Ezra	Episode: "Foxtrot"
2015	London Spy	Danny	Five-part TV series – lead role
2017	The Man on the Platform	Perce	First monologue in the Queers series
2018	A Very English Scandal	Norman Scott	Three-part series – lead role
2019–2025	The Adventures of Paddington	Paddington Bear	Voice
2020	Fargo	Rabbi Milligan	7 episodes
2022	This Is Going to Hurt	Adam Kay	7 episodes – lead role – also executive producer
2022	Platinum Party at the Palace	Paddington Bear	Queen Elizabeth II sketch
2024–present	Black Doves	Sam	Main role

=== Theatre ===
Year	Title	Role	Theatre	Notes
2003	His Dark Materials	Brother Jasper	Royal National Theatre	
2004	Hamlet	Hamlet	Old Vic	
2005	Mercury Fur	Elliot	Paines Plough at the Menier Chocolate Factory	
2006	The Seagull	Konstantin	Royal National Theatre	
2007	Leaves of Glass	Steven	Soho Theatre	
2008	...some trace of her	Prince Myshkin	Royal National Theatre	
2009	Cock	John	Royal Court Theatre	
2010	The Pride	Oliver	Lucille Lortel Theatre	
2013	Peter and Alice	Peter Llewelyn Davies	Noël Coward Theatre	
2013	Mojo	Baby	Harold Pinter Theatre	
2015	Bakkhai	Dionysus	Almeida Theatre	
2016	The Crucible	John Proctor	Walter Kerr Theatre	
2017	Against	Luke	Almeida Theatre	
2018	Julius Caesar	Brutus	Bridge Theatre	
2019	Norma Jeane Baker of Troy	Marilyn Monroe	The Shed	
2024	Bluets	A	Royal Court Theatre	
2024	Waiting for Godot	Vladimir	Theatre Royal Haymarket	
2026–2027	Eurotrash	TBA	Young Vic	

=== Radio ===
Year	Title	Role
2004	Arthur (Radio 4, six-part series of plays about Arthur, set in 5th-century Britain)	Arthur
2006	Look Back in Anger (Radio 4)	Jimmy Porter
2006	Radio 3 Wilfred Owen Season	Wilfred Owen's War Poems, read by Whishaw
2011	Cock (Radio 3)	John

Music Videos

Real – Years and Years (2014).

== See also ==
- List of British actors
- List of Royal National Theatre Company actors
- List of alumni of the Royal Academy of Dramatic Art
- List of International Emmy Award winners
- List of Primetime Emmy Award winners
- List of Golden Globe winners

Acting roles
Preceded by Frank MacCusker	Uriah Heep actor from David Copperfield; 2019	Most recent
Preceded by Matthew Garber	Michael Banks actor from Mary Poppins Returns; 2018	Most recent
Preceded by Jonathan Kydd	Paddington Bear actor 2014–present	Incumbent
Preceded by John Cleese	Q actor 2012–present	Incumbent
Preceded by Mark Rylance	Richard II actor 2012	Most recent
Preceded by Katrina Gourley	Ariel actor from The Tempest; 2010	Succeeded by Christopher Plummer
Preceded by Anthony Andrews	Sebastian Flyte actor from Brideshead Revisited; 2008	Most recent
New title	Daniel actor from The Booze Cruise; 2003	Succeeded by Tom Bennett
