= Independent Theatre (Adelaide) =

Amateur theatre company in Adelaide, Australia

Independent Theatre (IT) is an Australian theatre company based in Adelaide, South Australia. It has strong links to American theatre and culture, frequently producing plays by American playwrights, but also produces classical and contemporary theatre, as well as adaptations from novels.

Founded in 1983 by continuing artistic director Rob Croser, the company was the first non-professional company to be invited to perform in the Space Theatre at the Adelaide Festival Centre. Croser is assisted by David Roach, who has acted in several productions as well as designing sets for many. Independent Theatre has had a relationship with American playwright John Logan, who is a benefactor, since the 1990s, and has produced several of his plays. Logan's Peter and Alice was the company's hundredth production, staged in 2014. The company continues to produce three or four plays each year, usually staged at the Goodwood Institute or the Space.

== History ==
Independent Theatre (IT) was founded in 1983 by Rob Croser OAM (a lawyer in youth court), David Roach, Allen Munn, Pattie Atherton, and others. Croser became inaugural artistic director. The first performances were staged in 1984, and since then until at least 2022 the company has produced three or four plays every year, all but two directed by Croser.

Croser has collaborated with international theatre professionals, including Elaine Steinbeck, when preparing his adaptation of East of Eden for stage in 1998.

On Sunday 24 March 2019, the company threw a party at the Goodwood Institute to celebrate its 35th anniversary.

== Description ==
As of January 2023 the company was still being run by Rob Croser. Its major benefactor is American playwright and filmmaker John Logan.

The company has strong links to American theatre and culture, but also produces a variety of plays of many genres and types, including classical theatre such as Shakespearean drama.

== Venues ==
In the past, many of IT's productions have been staged at the Odeon Theatre in Norwood. Other venues have included Theatre 62, the Little Theatre, and, more recently, the Ukaria Cultural Centre.

As of 2023, most IT plays are performed at the Goodwood Institute, in the suburb of Goodwood, or at Space Theatre at the Adelaide Festival Centre.

== Selected productions ==
The company has staged productions of Hamlet twice - in 1999 and 2016. While the 1999 production featured an actor who was Hamlet's stated age in the play (30 years old), Nick Opolski, the 2016 production featured a much younger cast, with Will Cox playing Prince Hamlet as a teenager. Other Shakespearean plays performed by the company include Macbeth (2021) and Othello (1997, 2011, and 2022).

Jumping for Joy, a dark comedy by American playwright Jon Marans, had its Australian premiere at the Odeon Theatre in Norwood in an Independent Theatre production, directed by Croser, in 2003.

A production of Before the Party, a stage adaptation by Rodney Ackland of Somerset Maugham's short story "Before the Party", was staged in April 2017.

Chekhov's The Seagull was performed at the Little Theatre in early 2022.

Some Australian premiere productions of overseas works include:

- John Logan's Never the Sinner (1992, 1994, 2004); Hauptmann (1993); The View from Golgotha (1996); Red (2011; about artist Mark Rothko); Peter and Alice (2014)
- Helen Edmundson's Shared Experience production of War and Peace (2000)
- Roy Seargent's adaptation of the South African novel Cry the Beloved Country (2006, 2008)
- Samuel Adamson's adaptation of All About My Mother (2011)

== Achievements and recognition ==
Independent Theatre was the first non-professional company to be invited to perform in the Space Theatre, and to use the Festival Centre's theatres regularly afterwards.

It was the first company in Adelaide to cast Indian and African Australians in its productions, and the first company in Australia to cast an African actor as Othello, in the form of Shedrick Yarkpai, who is from Liberia.

It has had stronger links to American theatre and culture than other South Australian theatre companies.

=== Honours ===
- 2012: Rob Croser and David Roach, winners of the inaugural Richard Flynn Award, a lifetime achievement award given as part of the Adelaide Theatre Guide's Curtain Call awards, for "Sustained Excellence and Contribution to Theatre in South Australia"
- In 2013, Croser and Roach were both awarded Medals of the Order of Australia, for their contribution to the arts through amateur theatre.
- In the 2013 Governor's Multicultural Awards, Croser won the Arts and Culture Award "for an outstanding contribution through the arts and culture".
