= Adesola Osakalumi =

Adesola Osakalumi (born in The Bronx, New York) is an American actor, choreographer, singer, and dancer whose talents have garnered him successes in film, television, and stage.

== Early life ==
Adesola's fascination with dance began as a child. He was surrounded and heavily influenced by the art form at an early age. His mother was a principal dancer with Africa I Dance Theater, a touring company founded by his uncles and subsequently joined by his father. The company's mission was to perpetuate African dance and culture throughout the U.S. and beyond, and it would fuel the young Adesola's motivation to dance, choreograph, and teach. He studied briefly with the Dance Theater of Harlem and while there on a scholarship he learned to integrate his natural ability with routine and regiment and to master the many vocabularies of dance.

Growing up, Adesola was determined to be one of the best poppers and lockers on the scene (popping and locking are forms of "urban social dance" that originated from hip hop culture but have African roots). That wish came true when he was selected to be a part of Rhythm Technicians – a dance crew made up of some of hip hop's best-known B-Boys. The group gained great popularity in New York by performing regularly throughout the city.

The group later morphed into the GhettOriginals Productions Dance Company (GPDC), the pioneers of hip hop theater. As a co-founder of GPDC, Adesola helped hip-hop dance make a permanent impression on commercial theater. In addition to being the first hip-hop dance group to feature at the esteemed Colorado Dance Festival, GPDC also created the groundbreaking dance production, Jam on the Groove. The production premiered Off-Broadway at the Minetta Lane Theatre in November 1995 and won a Drama Desk Award nomination for Best Choreography. Jam on the Groove went on to tour the US, Europe, South America, and Asia to rave reviews.

In leadership, Adesola has served as artistic director for Hip Hop Kung Fu at The Asia Society (featuring hip hop artists from Japan, China, and the US), a board member of Dancing in the Streets, and is a choreographic mentor for Pentacle.

Adesola is best known for his roles in the award-winning Broadway musical FELA!, winning three Tony Awards for Best Choreography, Best Costume Design and Best Sound Design. In 2009, he joined the cast as both a dancer (Area Boy) in the ensemble and as the Fela Kuti understudy. In 2010, he played Fela Kuti four times on Broadway. In the 2011 national tour, he was promoted to play Fela as the alternate lead (playing the character on weekends and on some evenings). When the musical returned to Broadway in July 2012 for a limited engagement, Osakalumi became the main lead and went on to head the cast for the 2013 national tour and garnered rave reviews.

== Theater ==
- Fela!
- Equus
- Jam on the Groove

== Film ==
Year	Title	Role
1999	Double Platinum	Dancer
2003	Marci X	Associate Choreographer
2003	School of Rock	Choreographer
2006	Idlewild	Swop Dancer
2007	Across the Universe	Dancer
2007	Enchanted	Dancer
2008	The Accidental Husband	Didier
2008	Sex and the City 2	Nightclub DJ No. 1
2009	Ngwino Ubeho at The Sundance Theater Lab	Dancer
2010	Louis / The Great Observer	Dancer
2011	Crazy Beats Strong Every Time	Ade

== Choreography ==
Adesola has choreographed and danced in several commercials as well as upfronts for Target, American Express, Panasonic, PBS Kids, Old Navy, ESPN, Fox TV, Advil, Levi 501 Jeans, Halifax Bank, Merck, NV Energy, SAP, and several other companies all over the world. He served as Artistic Director / Co-Choreographer for Centrifugal Force at Lincoln Center's Out of Doors. He has choreographed for Eyewitness Blues for New York Theatre Workshop; Mister at the NY Fringe Festival and New York Theatre Workshop; and Hip Hop Wonderland with Bill Irwin at The New Victory Theatre.
