= Queen Mother Theatre =

Theatre in Hitchin

Coordinates: 51.94945°N 0.2739°W

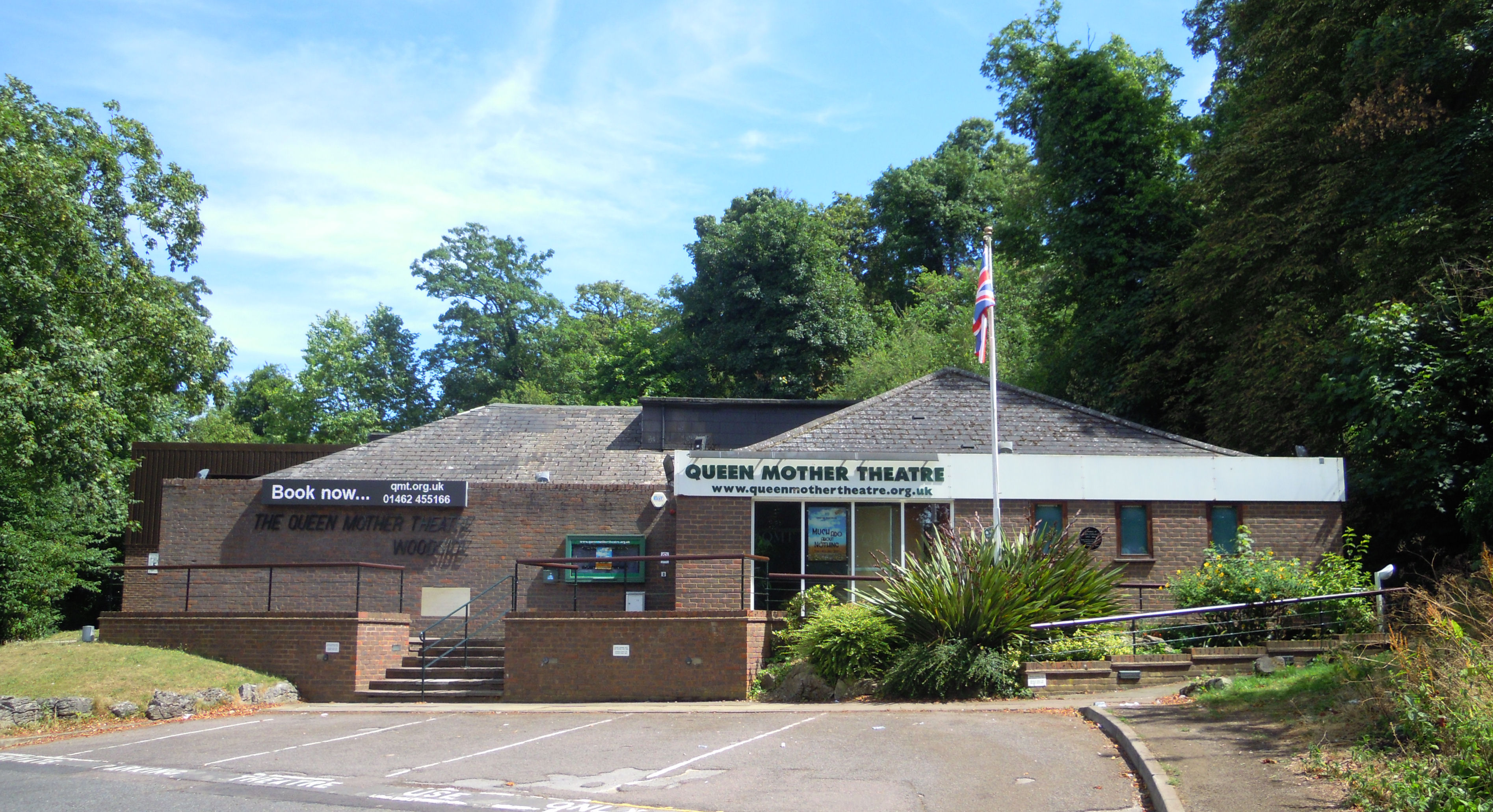
The Queen Mother Theatre in Hitchin

The Queen Mother Theatre is a modern purpose-built theatre located on Walsworth Road in Hitchin in Hertfordshire. Named after Queen Elizabeth The Queen Mother, the theatre offers a varied programme of amateur productions. It is the home of the local performing group the Bancroft Players and the critically acclaimed Big Spirit Youth Theatre founded in 1984 and which included the actor Ben Whishaw among its members.

In 1977 the Bancroft Players made plans for a purpose-built theatre in Hitchin and launched an appeal for £80,000 to begin work. At first the fundraising efforts were slow but by 1981 the group was able to make a start; however, the £8000 raised from the 1981-1982 season was insufficient to complete the build. In September 1982 the foundation stone was laid by Jimmy Hill, the President of the Appeal to raise the funds for the new theatre. At the same ceremony local resident Richard Whitmore told the assembled crowd that Queen Elizabeth The Queen Mother, who had connections with the area, had been approached for permission to name the theatre after her. It was suggested to her that the new theatre be named the Queen Elizabeth Theatre but instead she suggested the alternative name The Queen Mother Theatre. Thus the theatre has the distinction of being the United Kingdom's only theatre to carry this name.

The theatre finally opened in 1983 with a production of A Man for All Seasons. Since then the theatre has been extended to include a larger foyer and a new workshop and studio, now named the Richard Whitmore Studio. The actor Ben Whishaw was a member of the youth group Big Spirit Youth Theatre based at the theatre.
