= Fela! =

American Broadway musical

- Fela! logo
- Music: Fela Kuti
- Lyrics: Fela Kuti
- Book: Bill T. Jones; Jim Lewis
- Productions: 2008 Off-Broadway; 2009 Broadway; 2010 West End; 2011 World Tour; 2012 Broadway revival

Fela! is a jukebox musical with a book by Bill T. Jones and Jim Lewis, based on music and lyrics by the late Nigerian singer Fela Kuti, with additional music by Aaron Johnson and Jordan McLean and additional lyrics by Jim Lewis. The musical is based on events in the life of groundbreaking Nigerian composer and activist Fela Anikulapo Kuti. It portrays Kuti in the days when he was the target of 1,000 government soldiers assigned to end his public performances at the legendary Lagos nightclub The Shrine.

Fela! ran Off-Broadway for one month in 2008. It premiered on Broadway at the Eugene O'Neill Theatre on November 23, 2009, and ran until January 2011. The Off-Broadway production won the Lucille Lortel Awards for Best Musical, Outstanding Choreographer for Bill T. Jones, and Outstanding Costume Design for Marina Draghici. The Broadway production received eleven 2010 Tony Award nominations and won Best Choreography, Best Costume Design in a Musical, and Best Sound Design of a Musical. Alex Gibney's 2014 documentary film Finding Fela followed aspects of the Broadway musical, and drew heavily on interviews with Jones.

== Productions ==
Fela! opened at the Off-Broadway 37 Arts Theatre B on September 4, 2008, and closed on October 5, 2008. It was conceived by Bill T. Jones, Steve Hendel and Jim Lewis, directed and choreographed by Jones. The production was designed by Marina Draghici (scenery and costumes) Robert Wierzel (lighting), Peter Nigrini (projection), and Robert Kaplowitz (sound). The cast featured Sahr Ngaujah as Fela and Abena Koomson as Funmilayo, Fela's mother.

The Broadway production began previews at the Eugene O'Neill Theatre on October 19, 2009, and opened officially on November 23. Again directed and choreographed by Jones, the cast included Ngaujah and Kevin Mambo as Fela, Saycon Sengbloh and Michelle Williams as Sandra (Williams played Sandra in 2013) and Lillias White as Funmilayo. Patti LaBelle replaced Lillias White as Funmilayo on September 14, 2010. The production closed on January 2, 2011. The Broadway production received eleven Tony Award nominations, including one for Best Musical, the most of any production that season, along with the revival of La Cage aux Folles.

For both productions, Kuti's music was arranged and performed by the Brooklyn-based Antibalas, featuring the tenor saxophone soloist Stuart D. Bogie.

The London production, staged at the National Theatre's Olivier Theatre, began previews on November 6, 2010, with an opening night on November 16. It ran in repertoire with other National Theatre productions, and was simulcast internationally in 2011 as part of National Theatre Live. Sahr Ngaujah and Kevin Mambo appeared in the cast, as well as Dele Sosimi, Fela's former keyboard player, reprising his own role. In 2011, a production ran at Sadler's Wells Theatre in London's Islington.

Fela! toured in North America. Its opening performance was held in September 2011 at the Harman Center for the Arts in Washington, D.C. The production opened in Canada in October 2011 at the Canon Theatre in Toronto, starring Sahr Ngaujah and Adesola Osakalumi, with a scheduled run until November 2011. From November to December 2011, it played at the Curran Theatre in San Francisco. From December 2011 to January 2012, the production played in the Ahmanson Theatre of the Los Angeles Music Center, where it returned for a second run in April and May 2013. The musical had a limited return engagement on Broadway at the Al Hirschfeld Theatre from July 2012 to August 2012. The musical then continued on its world tour, playing in Australia, Japan, and a return to Africa, among other venues.

== Musical numbers ==
Act I

- "Everything Scatter" – Fela Anikulapo-Kuti and Company
- "Iba Orisa" (Traditional Yoruba chant) – Ismael, Fela Anikulapo-Kuti and Company
- "Hymn" – Company and Band
- "Medzi Medzi" – Company and Band
- "Manteca" – Company and Band
- "I Got the Feelin'" (James Brown) – Ismael and Company
- "The Clock/Originality" – Fela Anikulapo-Kuti and Company
- "Yellow Fever/Ikoyi Blindness" – Fela Anikulapo-Kuti and Company
- "Trouble Sleep" – Fela Anikulapo-Kuti, Funmilayo and Company
- "Teacher Don't Teach Me Nonsense" – Fela Anikulapo-Kuti, Funmilayo and Company
- "Lover" – Fela Anikulapo-Kuti and Sandra
- "Upside Down" – Fela Anikulapo-Kuti, Sandra and Company
- "Expensive Shit" – Fela Anikulapo-Kuti and Company
- "Pipeline" – Fela Anikulapo-Kuti and Company
- "I.T.T. (International Thief Thief)" – Fela Anikulapo-Kuti and Company
- "Kere Kay" – Fela Anikulapo-Kuti and Company

Act II

- "Water No Get Enemy" – Fela Anikulapo-Kuti, Sandra and Company
- "Egbe Mio" – Fela Anikulapo-Kuti, Queens and Funmilayo
- "Suffering and Smiling" – Fela Anikulapo-Kuti and Queens
- "Zombie" – Fela Anikulapo-Kuti and Company
- "Trouble Sleep" (Reprise) – Fela Anikulapo-Kuti, Funmilayo and Queens
- "Na Poi" – Fela Anikulapo-Kuti and Queens
- "Sorrow, Tears and Blood" – Fela Anikulapo-Kuti and Company
- "Iba Orisa/Shakara" – Company and Band
- "Rain" – Funmilayo and Company
- "Coffin for Head of State" – Fela Anikulapo-Kuti and Company
- "Kere Kay" (Reprise) – Fela Anikulapo-Kuti and Company

== Response ==
The 2008 Off-Broadway production received generally positive reviews. Ben Brantley of The New York Times observed:

This is music that gets into your bloodstream, setting off vibrations you'll live with for days to come.... If you set aside your basic nervous and circulatory systems, though, you might observe that by the standards of the well-made musical, Fela! leaves a lot to be desired. The structure of the book ... feels slapdash to the point of confusion. For all the impudence and exuberance of the wall-to-wall music ... a pious haze of hagiography hangs over the show, creating the blinkered view of a great man martyred. Yet the ascendancy of the music in Fela!, and the three-dimensional translation of it by Mr. Jones and his vibrant design team, makes such criticism irrelevant for as long as you're in your seat (or out of it, since the audience is regularly encouraged to stand and undulate). Mr. Jones and company have given us an African variation on the same theme [of the energetic rebel] that triumphantly stakes out its own pioneer territory in the expanding land of musicals.

David Rooney of Variety stated: "What it lacks in structure and concision [it] makes up for in heat, energy and sensuality. Like last season's Passing Strange and this summer's Hair revival, this dance-intensive bio-portrait aims to be less traditional musical theater than cathartic experience, lacing its communicative passion with infectious euphoria, rebellious anger and heartfelt despair." The review added: "There perhaps could be more texture in the central character portrait, providing deeper insight into the radical showman, and anyone expecting a detailed life story may be disappointed. Fela's questionable attitudes toward women are suggested rather than explored, and his later life, his ongoing political activity and death from AIDS-related illness in 1997 are absent. [The action] is deftly integrated with Peter Nigrini's video projections to create a show that's invigoratingly messy, visceral and transporting." Les Gutman of the internet magazine CurtainUp was even more enthusiastic, calling the musical "one of the most visually complete theatrical experiences imaginable" and a "true treasure".

The touring production received a positive review from The Globe and Mail′s J. Kelly Nestruck, who cited Sahr Ngaujah's performance for particular praise, as "channelling the life force of the titular singer" in a "sweat-soaked performance". Nestruck observed that

Lewis and Jones do focus on the more crowd-pleasing elements of Kuti's politics – his embrace of marijuana and attacks on militarism, corruption and corporate imperialism – while slightly brushing over the less palatable elements [...] His own sexually imperialist attitude toward women is underplayed in favour of an emphasis on his worship of his mother, an operatic, otherworldly presence voiced by Melanie Marshall.

== Disputes and lawsuits ==
In July 2010, New York photographer Marilyn Nance sought damages from the show, claiming the unauthorized use of one of her images.

In November 2010, writer and historian Carlos Moore, author of the 1982 authorized biography of Fela Kuti, Fela, Fela! This Bitch of a Life!, sued the producers of Fela! for copyright infringement, and asked the courts to close the show. In December 2011, the lawsuit was settled out of court, and it was agreed that all playbills and associated materials would henceforth bear an acknowledgement stating that the musical was inspired by Moore's book.

== Plot ==
Fela! takes place around 1977, at the height of Fela Kuti's influence as a composer and performer in Nigeria. Kuti was an originator of the Afrobeat sound, and the musical opens with him addressing the audience from a concert at his club, the Afrika Shrine in Nigeria's largest city, Lagos. Kuti indicates that the Afrika Shrine had become a hugely popular venue, and a gathering place for youth opposed to Nigeria's military dictatorship. As one critic describes much of the first half of the show:

It's part musicology lesson as Kuti explains how he discovered the Afrobeat sound by pulling together the drums from West African highlife and the ragged guitars from James Brown with traditional call-and-response vocals. As a front-man-in-training rambling around London in the early 1960s, he absorbed the influences of the two different shades of cool represented by Frank Sinatra and Miles Davis.

Kuti reveals how torn he is between his respect for the example set by his mother, Funmilayo, a teacher and Nigerian civil rights activist, and his quest for fame and sometimes hedonism. He gradually becomes more involved in open opposition to Nigeria's military regime, and his lyrics become overtly political. The regime responds to the provocation with increasingly violent retaliation. Kuti perseveres and releases Zombie, an international hit openly critical of the Nigerian government. The show depicts the army raid of Kuti's compound (a commune he called Kalakuta Republic), reportedly by 1000 soldiers, which followed the release of Zombie. The raid culminates with the torture of Kuti, his wives and other commune residents, and the murder of his mother. The show concludes with a protest staged by Kuti in October 1979, accompanied by his family and members of the Young African Pioneers. The protest was held on the day before General Olusegun Obasanjo was to retire from the Nigerian presidency for the first time. Kuti held Obasanjo responsible for his mother's death, and publicly defied the regime once again with his protest, leaving a symbolic coffin in front of Obasanjo's residence at the Dodan army barracks. The show concludes with symbolic coffins being laid on the stage to protest injustices suffered by the people of Nigeria and throughout Africa.

== Awards and nominations ==
=== Original Off-Broadway production ===
| Year | Award Ceremony | Category | Nominee | Result |
|---|---|---|---|---|
| 2009 | Drama Desk Award | Outstanding Musical | | Nominated |
| 2009 | Drama Desk Award | Outstanding Actor in a Musical | Sahr Ngaujah | Nominated |
| 2009 | Drama Desk Award | Outstanding Choreography | Bill T. Jones | Nominated |
| 2009 | Drama Desk Award | Outstanding Orchestrations | Aaron Johnson | Nominated |

=== Original Broadway production ===
| Year | Award Ceremony | Category | Nominee | Result |
|---|---|---|---|---|
| 2010 | Tony Award | Best Musical | | Nominated |
| 2010 | Tony Award | Best Book of a Musical | Bill T. Jones and Jim Lewis | Nominated |
| 2010 | Tony Award | Best Performance by a Leading Actor in a Musical | Sahr Ngaujah | Nominated |
| 2010 | Tony Award | Best Performance by a Featured Actress in a Musical | Lillias White | Nominated |
| 2010 | Tony Award | Best Direction of a Musical | Bill T. Jones | Nominated |
| 2010 | Tony Award | Best Choreography | Bill T. Jones | Won |
| 2010 | Tony Award | Best Orchestrations | Aaron Johnson | Nominated |
| 2010 | Tony Award | Best Scenic Design | Marina Draghici | Nominated |
| 2010 | Tony Award | Best Costume Design | Marina Draghici | Won |
| 2010 | Tony Award | Best Lighting Design | Robert Weirzel | Nominated |
| 2010 | Tony Award | Best Sound Design | Robert Kaplowitz | Won |
| 2011 | Grammy Award | Best Musical Show Album | | Nominated |

=== Original London production ===
| Year | Award Ceremony | Category | Nominee | Result |
|---|---|---|---|---|
| 2011 | Laurence Olivier Award | Best New Musical | | Nominated |
| 2011 | Laurence Olivier Award | Best Actor in a Musical | Sahr Ngaujah | Nominated |
| 2011 | Laurence Olivier Award | Best Theatre Choreographer | Bill T. Jones | Nominated |
