= Marina Draghici =

Romanian costume and set designer

- Marina Drăghici
- Born: Bucharest, Romania
- Education: Yale University (MFA)
- Occupations: Costume designer, set designer
- Website: marinadraghici.com

Marina Draghici is a Romanian costume and set designer best known for her work on Fela!.

== Early life and education ==
Draghici was born in Bucharest, Romania, and later emigrated to the United States. She graduated from Yale's David Geffen School of Drama in 1988.

== Career ==
Draghici's Off-Broadway credits include Mercedes (1991), Mad Forest (1991,1992), Woyzeck (1992), Henry V (1993), The Lights (1993), The Striker (1996), Cymbeline (1998), The Taming of the Shrew (1999), Hamlet (1999), Everything that Rises Must Converge (2001), Small Tragedy (2004), Richard III (2004), Mother Courage and Her Children (2006), and And Then There Were No More (2025). For Mad Forest, Draghici won an Obie Award for Sets and Costumes.

In 2008, Draghici designed the costumes and scenery for the Off-Broadway musical Fela!. At the 2009 Lucille Lortel Awards, Draghici was nominated for Outstanding Scenic Design and won for Outstanding Costume Design. In October, 2009, the production moved to Broadway's Eugene O'Neill Theatre. At the 64th Tony Awards, Draghici was nominated for Best Scenic Design of a Musical and won for Best Costume Design of a Musical.

Draghici has worked in costume design for film and television. For her work on Precious, she was nominated for the Costume Designers Guild Award for Excellence in Contemporary Film.
