= Peter and Alice =

Play by John Logan

- Original language: English
- Written by: John Logan
- Characters: Peter Llewelyn Davies, Alice Liddell Hargreaves
- Genre: Drama
- Setting: Bookshop, London

Premiere
- Date: 25 March 2013
- Place: Noël Coward Theatre, London

Peter and Alice is a play by American writer John Logan based on the meeting of 80-year-old Alice Liddell Hargreaves and Peter Llewelyn Davies, then in his thirties, in a London bookshop in 1932, at the opening of a Lewis Carroll exhibition. It was first staged in London in March 2013, directed by Michael Grandage. The portrayal of Carroll and Liddell in the play is very loosely inspired by Anne Clarke's 1981 biography The Real Alice.

== Synopsis ==
The play is based on a meeting between Alice Liddell Hargreaves, the woman who inspired Alice, and Peter Llewellyn Davies, one of the boys who inspired Peter Pan, at the opening of a Lewis Carroll exhibition in 1932. The play sees enchantment and reality collide as this brief encounter lays bare the lives of these two characters.

== Original production ==
The original production was directed by Michael Grandage, staged at the Noël Coward Theatre in London in March 2013 and starring Judi Dench as Alice and Ben Whishaw as Peter.

=== Cast ===
- Ben Whishaw as Peter Llewelyn Davies
- Judi Dench as Alice Liddell Hargreaves
- Nicholas Farrell as Lewis Carroll
- Derek Riddell as J.M. Barrie
- Olly Alexander as Peter Pan
- Ruby Bentall as Alice in Wonderland
- Stefano Braschi as Arthur Llewelyn Davies / Reginald Hargreaves / Michael Llewelyn Davies

Understudies included:

- Stefano Braschi for Peter Llewelyn Davies;
- Georgina Beedle for Alice in Wonderland;
- Henry Everett for both Lewis Carroll and J.M. Barrie;
- Christoper Leveaux for Peter Pan, Arthur Llewelyn Davies, Reginald Hargreaves and Michael Llewelyn Davies;
- Pamela Merrick for Alice Liddell Hargreaves.

=== Reception ===
Reviews for the production were positive for the play. Michael Billington in The Guardian wrote: "It's not a play that shocks or startles by its insights, but the reward lies in watching Dench and Whishaw recreate the agony and the ecstasy of inherited fame.". Charles Spencer in The Telegraph wrote: "It's a beautiful and searching play that will live long in the memory". Libby Purves in The Times wrote "A meeting of two childhood muses, played by Judi Dench and Ben Whishaw, breaks your heart open".

However, there was some criticism of the play. Henry Hitchings in The Evening Standard wrote: "this is a piece that uses lush language to compensate for its lack of real dynamism". Lewis Carroll scholar Franziska Kholt, in an article for The Lewis Carroll Review, criticised the portrayal of "Carroll as needy and creepy" and also criticised Logan's way of characterising events. "the inaccuracy of the events recalled... suggests either, that Logan thinks the characters actually lied about their own past, or, that Logan read Alice's biography, and (quite literally) "sexed it up"

== Other productions ==
Peter and Alice was staged by the small South Australian theatre company, Independent Theatre, which has an established relationship with Logan, in August 2014. Directed by Rob Croser, the production was staged at the Space Theatre at the Adelaide Festival Centre. It was the company's 100th production, in their 30th year of existence. The lead roles were performed by Pam O'Grady and William Cox. Reviews were generally good, with both the acting and Croser and David Roach's set design praised; however one reviewer found it "a bit too practiced".

== Awards and nominations ==
=== London production ===
Year	Award	Category	Nominee	Result	Ref
2014	Laurence Olivier Award	Best New Play		Nominated	
2014	Laurence Olivier Award	Best Actress	Judi Dench	Nominated	
