= John Logan (writer) =

American playwright and screenwriter (born 1961)

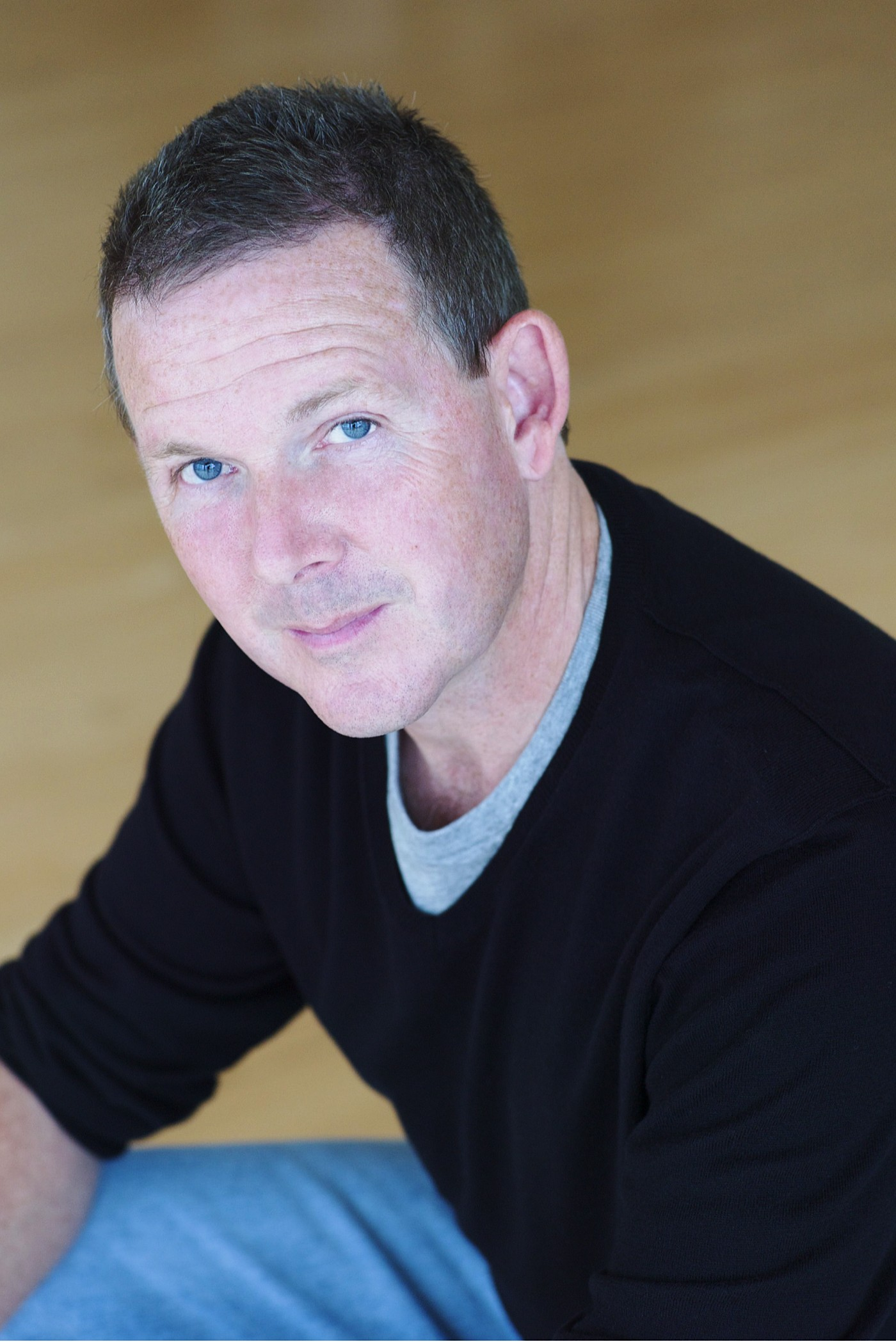
- Logan in 2009
- Born: John David Logan; September 24, 1961 (age 65)
- Education: Northwestern University
- Occupations: Playwright; screenwriter; producer
- Years active: 1985–present
- Awards: Full list

John David Logan (born September 24, 1961) is an American playwright, screenwriter, and producer. His film work includes Gladiator (2000), The Last Samurai (2003), Sweeney Todd: The Demon Barber of Fleet Street (2007), The Aviator (2004), Hugo (2011), James Bond films Skyfall (2012) and Spectre (2015), and Michael (2026). He has won a Tony Award, a WGA award and has been nominated for three Academy Awards and three British Academy Film Awards.

== Life and career ==
=== Early years and education ===
Logan's parents immigrated to the United States from Northern Ireland via Canada. The youngest of three children, he has an older brother and sister. Logan grew up in California and Millburn, New Jersey, where he graduated from Millburn High School in 1979. He moved to Chicago to attend Northwestern University, where he graduated in 1983.

=== Stage ===
Logan was a successful playwright in Chicago for many years before turning to screenwriting. His first play, Never the Sinner, tells the story of the infamous Leopold and Loeb case. Subsequent plays include Hauptmann, about the Lindbergh baby kidnapping, and Riverview, a musical melodrama set at Chicago's famed amusement park.

His play Red, about artist Mark Rothko, was produced by the Donmar Warehouse, London, in December 2009, and on Broadway in 2010, where it received six Tony Awards, the most of any play, including best play, best direction of a play for Michael Grandage and best featured actor in a play for Eddie Redmayne. Redmayne and Alfred Molina had originated their roles in London and also performed on Broadway, for a limited run ending in late June.

Two plays by Logan premiered in 2013; Peter and Alice, directed by Michael Grandage and starring Judi Dench and Ben Whishaw opened in London at the Noël Coward Theatre on March 25, 2013, and I'll Eat You Last: A Chat with Sue Mengers, directed by Joe Mantello and starring Bette Midler, opened on Broadway at the Booth Theatre on April 24, 2013.

Superhero, a musical by Logan and Tom Kitt, had its world premiere production Off-Broadway at Second Stage Theater, with an official opening night on February 28, 2019.

Swept Away, a musical by Logan, directed by Michael Mayer, and featuring music from The Avett Brothers, tells the story of four men shipwrecked in 1888, each facing questions of existentialism and morality. It opened at Peet's Theatre at Berkeley Repertory on January 9, 2022. It later moved to Broadway, opening at the Longacre Theatre on November 19, 2024.

Logan's play Double Feature, about filmmaking and the relationship between director and star, opened at the Hampstead Theatre, London, on February 8, 2024.

He also wrote the book for the Tony Award winning best musical Moulin Rouge, which opened on Broadway on July 25, 2019, and has been produced around the world.

=== Film and TV ===
Logan wrote the 1999 Oliver Stone sports drama Any Given Sunday, which "changed his life". He then wrote the television film RKO 281, a historical drama released in the same year.

He co-wrote Gladiator (2000), directed by Ridley Scott, followed by Star Trek: Nemesis and The Time Machine, both released in 2002. In 2003, he co-wrote The Last Samurai, directed by Edward Zwick, and wrote Sinbad: Legend of the Seven Seas. Logan later wrote The Aviator (2004), directed by Martin Scorsese, and Sweeney Todd: The Demon Barber of Fleet Street (2007), directed by Tim Burton.

Logan's feature films include three films released in 2011: Rango, an animated feature starring Johnny Depp and directed by Gore Verbinski; the film adaptation of Shakespeare's Coriolanus, directed by and starring Ralph Fiennes; and Hugo, an adaptation of the book The Invention of Hugo Cabret, directed by Martin Scorsese. He also wrote James Bond films Skyfall (2012) and Spectre (2015), along with Neal Purvis and Robert Wade.

Logan also created the 2014 television series Penny Dreadful starring Josh Hartnett, Eva Green and Timothy Dalton. The show aired on Showtime in United States and Sky Atlantic in United Kingdom. In November 2018, it was announced that Showtime would produce a follow-up to the series entitled Penny Dreadful: City of Angels, which takes place in Los Angeles in 1938. Logan was the creator and executive producer for the show, which premiered in 2020 and ran for one season, starring Daniel Zovatto, Nathan Lane, and Natalie Dormer.

In November 2015, Logan was reported to have rewritten the script for Alien: Covenant.

Logan made his feature directorial debut in 2022 with They/Them, a slasher film from Blumhouse Films released via the streaming service Peacock.

In November 2019, it was reported that Bohemian Rhapsody producer Graham King was planning to produce a Michael Jackson biopic, with the screenplay written by Logan. The film, Michael, directed by Antoine Fuqua, was released in 2026 and opened to a record-breaking box office debut, grossing approximately $97 million domestically and $217 million worldwide, the largest opening weekend for a musical biopic and one of the biggest debuts of the year.

== Personal life and other activities ==
Logan is openly gay. He is married to Irish choreographer Tommy Tonge. Logan is actively involved in philanthropic activities through his charitable foundation, which supports arts education, access to live theatre, and supporting environmental conservation.

He is a major benefactor of a small independent theatre company in Adelaide, South Australia, run by Rob Croser, called called Independent Theatre. Several of his plays have been produced there, including Never the Sinner (1992, 1994, 2004); Hauptmann (1993); The View from Golgotha (1996); Red (2011; about artist Mark Rothko); Peter and Alice (2014), and he has travelled to Adelaide several times to see his plays as well as work on other productions.

== Works ==
=== Selected plays ===
Logan's plays include:

- Never the Sinner (1985)
- Speaking in Tongues (1988)
- Hauptmann (1991)
- Riverview (1992)
- The View from Golgotha (1996)
- Red (2009)
- Peter and Alice (2013)
- I'll Eat You Last: A Chat with Sue Mengers (2013)
- The Last Ship (2014)
- Moulin Rouge! (2018)
- Superhero (2019)
- Swept Away (2022)
- Double Feature (2024)

=== Filmography ===
==== Film ====
Year	Title	Writer	Producer	Director
1999	Bats	Yes	Executive	Louis Morneau
1999	Any Given Sunday	Yes	No	Oliver Stone
2000	Gladiator	Yes	No	Ridley Scott
2002	The Time Machine	Yes	Co-producer	Simon Wells
2002	Star Trek: Nemesis	Yes	No	Stuart Baird
2003	Sinbad: Legend of the Seven Seas	Yes	No	Tim Johnson; Patrick Gilmore
2003	The Last Samurai	Yes	No	Edward Zwick
2004	The Aviator	Yes	No	Martin Scorsese
2007	Sweeney Todd: The Demon Barber of Fleet Street	Yes	Yes	Tim Burton
2011	Rango	Yes	No	Gore Verbinski
2011	Coriolanus	Yes	Yes	Ralph Fiennes
2011	Hugo	Yes	No	Martin Scorsese
2012	Skyfall	Yes	No	Sam Mendes
2014	Jamie Marks Is Dead	No	Executive	Carter Smith
2015	Spectre	Yes	No	Sam Mendes
2016	Genius	Yes	Yes	Michael Grandage
2017	Alien: Covenant	Yes	No	Ridley Scott
2022	They/Them	Yes	No	Himself
2026	Michael	Yes	No	Antoine Fuqua

==== Television ====
Year	Title	Creator	Writer	Executive producer	Notes
1996	Tornado!	No	Yes	No	Television film
1999	RKO 281	No	Yes	No	Television film
2014–2016	Penny Dreadful	Yes	Yes	Yes	Executive producer (27 episodes); writer (24 episodes)
2020	Penny Dreadful: City of Angels	Yes	Yes	Yes	Executive producer (10 episodes); writer (6 episodes)

== Accolades ==
- Primetime Emmy Award
  - Nominated, Outstanding Writing for a Miniseries or a Movie for RKO 281 (2000)
- Academy Awards:
  - Nominated, Best Original Screenplay for Gladiator (2000), co-written (with David Franzoni and William Nicholson)
  - Nominated, Best Original Screenplay, for The Aviator (2004)
  - Nominated, Best Adapted Screenplay, for Hugo (2011)
- Golden Globe Award
  - Nominated, Best Screenplay for The Aviator (2004)
- Tony Awards:
  - Winner, Best Play for Red (2010)
  - Nominated, Best Book of a Musical for Moulin Rouge! (2020)
