= List of Royal National Theatre Company actors =

This is a list of actors who have performed at the Royal National Theatre, which is based in London, England.

- Peggy Ashcroft
- Eileen Atkins
- Tom Baker
- Frank Barrie
- Simon Russell Beale
- Caroline Blakiston
- Michael Brandon
- Jeremy Brett
- Jim Broadbent
- Dora Bryan
- Michael Bryant
- Anna Calder-Marshall
- Simon Callow
- Michael Cashman
- John Challis
- Ian Charleson
- David Collings
- Rowena Cooper
- Brian Cox
- Felicity Dean
- Judi Dench
- Olympia Dukakis
- Christopher Eccleston
- Lynn Farleigh
- Albert Finney
- Ann Firbank
- Paul Freeman
- Michael Gambon
- John Gielgud
- Julian Glover
- Adam Godley
- Sheila Hancock
- Nigel Havers
- Ian Holm
- Anthony Hopkins
- Bernard Horsfall
- Derek Jacobi
- Louise Jameson
- Martin Jarvis
- Michael Jayston
- Caroline John
- Dinsdale Landen
- Adrian Lester
- Nigel Lindsay
- Maureen Lipman
- Helen McCrory
- Phelim McDermott
- Ian McKellen
- Mark McManus
- Lesley Manville
- Helen Mirren
- John Normington
- Tracy-Ann Oberman
- Laurence Olivier
- Trevor Peacock
- Ronald Pickup
- Joan Plowright
- Christopher Plummer
- Tim Preece
- Corin Redgrave
- Vanessa Redgrave
- Alan Rickman
- Diana Rigg
- Paul Scofield
- John Shrapnel
- Lee Simpson
- Maggie Smith
- Robert Stephens
- John Stride
- Catherine Tate
- David Tennant
- Christopher Timothy
- Frederick Treves
- Benjamin Whitrow
- Jodie Whittaker
- John Wood
- Peter Woodthorpe
- Adam Woodyatt

== See also ==
- List of people from London
- List of British actors
- Theatre of the United Kingdom
