= Michael Kuchwara =

American journalist

- Born: Michael Charlies Kuchwara; February 28, 1947; Scranton, Pennsylvania, United States
- Died: May 22, 2010 (aged 63); Manhattan, New York City, United States
- Education: Syracuse University; University of Missouri
- Occupations: Theater critic, journalist, writer

Michael Charlies Kuchwara (February 28, 1947 – May 22, 2010) was an American theater critic, columnist and journalist. Kuchwara worked as both a critic and journalist for the Associated Press for more than from 1984 until 2010, writing pieces that were read worldwide. Kuchwara, who was based in New York City, reviewed as many as 200 theater productions a year.

== Biography ==
=== Early life ===
Kuchwara was born on February 28, 1947, in Scranton, Pennsylvania. His father, a United States Air Force pilot, worked for the National Security Agency. Kuchwara's interest in theater and the entertainment industry began when he saw his first play during the late-1950s, the comedic Third Best Sport, by Leo G. Bayer and Eleanor Perry, at the Poconos Playhouse in Pennsylvania.

He received his bachelor's degree from Syracuse University and his master's degree from the University of Missouri.

=== Career ===
Kuchwara worked for the Associated Press for more than 40 years, first as a reporter and then as a theater critic. He began his career as a journalist for the Associated Press' bureau in Chicago, Illinois. He moved to New York City to work as an AP editor on the wire service's national desk.

In 1984, Kuchwara became the Associated Press chief theater critic, a position he held until his death in 2010.

Michael Kuchwara died at Beth Israel Hospital in Manhattan of idiopathic ischemic lung disease on May 22, 2010, at the age of 63. He is survived by his sister, Patricia Henley, and wife, Jonnie Kay Kitchen; the couple had been married since 1975.
