= Ruthie Henshall =

English entertainer (born 1967)

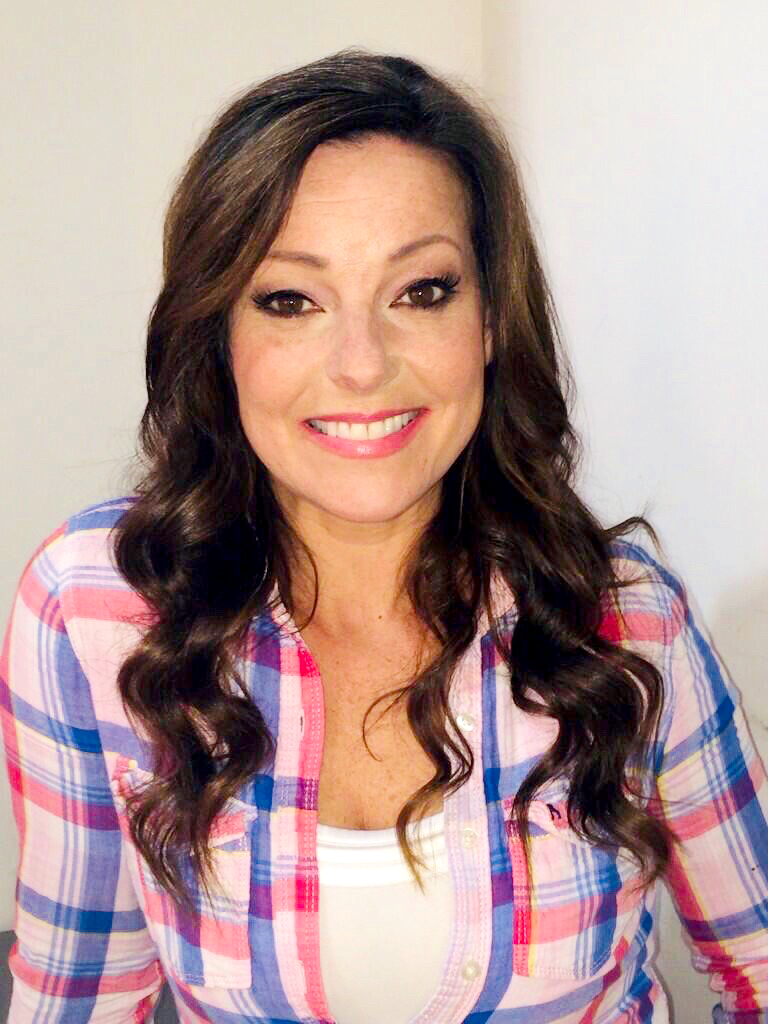
- Henshall in 2019
- Born: Valentine Ruth Henshall; 7 March 1967 (age 59); Orpington, London, England
- Occupations: Actress; singer; dancer
- Years active: 1986–present
- Spouse: Tim Howar (m. 2004; div. 2010)
- Children: 2
- Website: www.ruthiehenshall.com

Valentine Ruth Henshall (born 7 March 1967), known professionally as Ruthie Henshall, is an English actress, singer and dancer, known for her work in musical theatre. She began her professional stage career in 1986, before making her West End debut in Cats in 1987. A five-time Olivier Award nominee, she won the 1995 Olivier Award for Best Actress in a Musical for her role as Amalia Balash in the London revival of She Loves Me (1994).

Henshall's other Olivier nominated roles are Polly Baker in the original London production of Crazy for You (1993–1994), Roxie Hart in the revival of Chicago (1997–1998) and the title roles in the original productions of Peggy Sue Got Married (2001) and Marguerite (2008). She made her Broadway debut in 1999 as Velma Kelly in Chicago and returned to the Broadway production to play Roxie Hart in 2010. She also starred as Mrs Wilkinson for two years in the West End production of Billy Elliot the Musical (2014–2016). She returned to television acting in 2021 by appearing as Miranda Evans in the BBC soap opera Doctors.

== Early and personal life ==
Henshall was born on 7 March 1967 in Orpington, Kent. Her father, David, was a journalist, later the editor of the East Anglian Daily Times, a Suffolk morning newspaper. Henshall dated Prince Edward from 1988 to 1993 when both were in their twenties, before becoming engaged to actor John Gordon Sinclair. After she took the role of Velma Kelly in Chicago on Broadway, the relationship ended.

She met actor and singer Tim Howar, her male co-star lead in the West End production of Peggy Sue Got Married. The couple married in 2004 and have two daughters. The couple separated in August 2009 and later divorced in January 2010.

== Career ==
Prior to making her stage debut at the age of 19, Henshall trained at Laine Theatre Arts in Epsom, Surrey. Her debut performance was in the Cascade Revue at the West Cliff Theatre in Clacton-on-Sea. In the late 1980s and early 1990s, she took part in a touring production of A Chorus Line as Maggie. Her West End debut came shortly thereafter when she was cast in Cats, making appearances as Jemima, Demeter, Griddlebone and Grizabella.

In 1988, at the age of 21, Henshall was cast in Miss Saigon as one of the bar girls, showing at the Theatre Royal, Drury Lane. She later took over the role of Ellen, and later played Ellen on Broadway.

She then went on to originate the role of Aphra in Children of Eden at the Prince Edward Theatre. The summer of 1989 saw her at the Chichester Festival Theatre performing in plays by Shakespeare, Molière as well as a role in the musical Valentine's Day, based on You Can Never Tell by George Bernard Shaw.

In 1992, at the age of 25, Henshall was cast as Fantine in Les Misérables. Her first starring role came in the 1993 trans-Atlantic transfer of the Broadway production Crazy for You which opened at the Prince Edward Theatre. Her performance earned her the first of five Olivier Award nominations. In 1995, Henshall starred in She Loves Me, winning the Olivier as Best Actress in a Musical. That same year, she performed a concert of Gershwin songs at London's Royal Festival Hall. Later, in October, she recreated her role of Fantine for the 10th Anniversary Concert performance of Les Misérables at the Royal Albert Hall. In 1996, she took on the role of Nancy in producer Cameron Mackintosh's hit revival of Oliver! at the London Palladium. In 1997, Henshall originated the role of Roxie Hart in the West End transfer of the Broadway revival of Chicago. For this role, she received her third Olivier nomination for Best Actress in a Musical, which went to her co-star Ute Lemper.

Henshall was cast in the title role of the stage musical adaptation of the Francis Ford Coppola film Peggy Sue Got Married, which opened in London in August 2001 to mixed reviews. Although it closed after a run of just eight weeks, she was once again nominated for a Laurence Olivier Award for her performance.

Henshall has also appeared at the Chichester Festival Theatre, has toured Britain in the revue The Magnificent Musicals, and has performed in Hey, Mr. Producer!, a celebration of the works of Cameron Mackintosh. Her solo recordings include The Ruthie Henshall Album, Pilgrim, and Love Is Here to Stay, a collection of Gershwin tunes. She succeeded the role of Marian Halcombe from Maria Friedman in Andrew Lloyd Webber's The Woman in White, from July 2005 until February 2006. She was also cast in the title role in Marguerite, a new musical from the pens of Michel Legrand, Herbert Kretzmer, Alain Boublil and Claude-Michel Schönberg. The show opened on 7 May 2008 at the Theatre Royal Haymarket, London, but closed early on 13 September 2008.

Henshall's Broadway credits include Stephen Sondheim's Putting It Together, Chicago (as both Velma and Roxie), and off-Broadway The Vagina Monologues. In 2000 she guest-starred in an episode of Law & Order titled "Panic"; she played an author named P.K. Todd. Her first feature film, a musical version of A Christmas Carol with Kelsey Grammer, aired on NBC in the United States in November 2004 and was released as a commercial attraction to theatres in the UK and Europe. In January 2006 she appeared in the four-part BBC Television series The Sound of Musicals.

In 2008, Henshall replaced Natalia Bestemianova as a judge on the ITV1 show Dancing on Ice alongside Robin Cousins, Karen Barber, Nicky Slater and Jason Gardiner. Her appointment to The Ice Panel caused some controversy as she was the only judge with no experience in ice skating. She returned for a second series in 2009. Following the conclusion of the 2009 series, Henshall said on Angela and Friends the Sky1 TV programme that she was glad that she was away from Dancing on Ice. Her replacement for the 2010 series was Emma Bunton.

Henshall performed two evening concerts with Kim Criswell entitled From Broadway to Hollywood at London's Cadogan Hall in the summer of 2009.

She returned to the role of Roxie in Chicago at the Cambridge Theatre, London, on 14 December 2009 and completed her run on 24 April 2010. This was the second time Henshall played the role in London, having created it in 1997. She stated in an interview that she felt more comfortable in the part the second time around, being in her forties. She has stated that, "Anyone who plays the role of Roxie should be in their forties, as they have lived and learned". She has also recently played Roxie in the Broadway company of Chicago.

In March 2011, Henshall took the role of Elvira in the classic play Blithe Spirit in the West End, after playing the role in several regional theatre engagements.

In 2011 she also appeared as a theatre actor in an episode of the HBO comedy Curb Your Enthusiasm that aired 14 August, as well as a lawyer in The Case, a 5-part legal drama that aired from 31 October to 4 November on BBC One.

In February 2012 it was announced that Henshall will headline a concert of Side by Side by Sondheim in Australia. Henshall took a purely acting role as billionaire Stephanie Gaunt in the CBBC series Wizards vs Aliens in 2012. Henshall and Daniel Bowling (director of musicals) have written a book, So You Want to Be in Musicals?, published in 2012. In 2014, it was announced that she would play Mrs Wilkinson in Billy Elliot the Musical from 12 May. After two years in the production, she became the final actress to take on the role before the show's closure.

In 2020, it was confirmed that Henshall would be participating in the twentieth series of I'm a Celebrity...Get Me Out of Here. She was eliminated on 29 November, finishing in 11th place. In March 2021, she began appearing in the BBC soap opera Doctors as Miranda Evans.

In 2022, Henshall starred in the revival of Stephen Sondheim and James Lapine's musical Passion at the Hope Mill Theatre in Manchester, playing Fosca.

In September 2025, Henshall joined the revival of Cabaret in the West End as Fräulein Schneider.

== Filmography ==
Year	Title	Role	Notes
1992	Get Back	Rita Henderson	Series 1; Episode 2: "We Can Work It Out"
1994–1995	That's Showbusiness	Herself - Panellist	Series 6; Episode 25, and Series 7; Episodes 19 & 24
1995	Great Performances	Fantine	Series 24; Episode 10: "Les Misérables in Concert"
2000	Law & Order	P.K. Todd	Series 10; Episode 13: "Panic"
2001	Deadline	Sweeney	Episode 11: "Just Lie Back"
2001	Putting It Together: Direct from Broadway	The Young Woman	Television films
2004	A Christmas Carol: The Musical	Scrooge's Mother	Television films
2005	Celebrate 'Oliver!'	Nancy	Television films
2008–2009	Dancing on Ice	Herself - Judge	Series 3 & 4; 31 episodes
2009	All Star Family Fortunes	Herself - Contestant	Series 3; Episode 12: Ruthie Henshall vs Shane Lynch
2011	Curb Your Enthusiasm	Ally	Series 8; Episode 6: "The Hero"
2011	The Case	Valerie Mornay	Mini-series; Episodes 1–5
2012	Wizards vs Aliens	Stephanie Gaunt	Series 1; Episodes 7 & 8: "Friend or Foe, Parts 1 & 2"
2014	Billy Elliot the Musical Live	Mrs. Wilkinson	Video. Live recording of Billy Elliot the Musical
2018	Isabella	Amanda	Short film
2020	I'm a Celebrity...Get Me Out of Here!	Herself - Contestant	Series 20; 19 episodes
2021	Doctors	Miranda Evans	Recurring role. Series 22; 7 episodes
2021	Celebrity Chase	Herself - Contestant	Series 11; Episode 11: "Christmas Special"
2022	Olivier Awards	Herself - Guest Presenter	1 episode
2022	Celebrity Mastermind	Herself - Contestant	Series 20; Episode 2
2022	Shakespeare & Hathaway: Private Investigators	Beattie Delamar	Series 4; Episode 2: "If Music Be the Food of Love"
2023	Pointless Celebrities	Herself - Contestant	Series 15; Episode 19
2023–2024	Coronation Street	Estelle Harrington	Recurring role (4 episodes)
2024	Richard Osman's House of Games	Herself - Contestant	Series 8; Episodes 46–50 (Week 10)
2026	Dragon Striker	TBA	

== Stage credits ==
- A Chorus Line (UK tour, 1987) as Maggie
- Cats (London cast, 1987–1989) as Jemima, Demeter, Jellyorum, Griddlebone, Grizabella
- Bernadette (Concept album, 1989) Performer
- Miss Saigon (Original London cast, 1989–1990) as Bar Girl, Ellen
- Children of Eden (Original London cast, 1991) as Aphra
- Henry VIII (Chichester Festival Theater, 1991) as Lady in Waiting
- The Sisterhood (Chichester cast, 1991) as Martine
- Valentine's Day (Chichester cast, 1991) as Mabel
- Follow the Star (Chichester Festival Theatre, 1991–1992) as Mary
- Les Misérables (London cast, 1992) as Fantine
- Godspell (Studio cast, 1993) Performer
- Crazy for You (Original London cast, 1993–1994) as Polly Baker
- She Loves Me (London revival cast, 1994) as Amalia Balash
- Annie (Studio cast, 1995) Performer
- Miss Saigon (Studio cast, 1995) as Ellen
- Les Misérables (London concert cast, 1995) as Fantine
- Crazy for You (Toronto cast) as Polly Baker
- Oliver! (London cast, 1996) as Nancy
- Divorce Me, Darling! (Chichester Festival cast, 1997) as Polly Brockhurst
- Chicago (London and Broadway revival cast, 1997–1998, 1999, 2010) as Roxie Hart
- Ziegfeld Follies of 1936 (New York concert cast, 1999) Roles originated by Gertrude Niesen
- Chicago (Broadway cast, 1999) as Velma Kelly
- Putting It Together (Broadway revival, 1999) as The Younger Woman
- The Vagina Monologues (Original Off-Broadway production, 2000)
- Miss Saigon (Broadway cast), (Broadway cast replacement, 31 December 2000 – 28 January 2001) as Ellen
- Peggy Sue Got Married (Original London Production, 2001) as Peggy Sue
- The Vagina Monologues (London cast, 2001–2002)
- The Boy from Oz (New York workshop, 2002) as Liza Minnelli
- Chicago (London cast, 2003) Velma Kelly
- Fosse (UK Tour, 2003)
- The Woman in White (Original London production, 2004–2005) as Marian
- The Other Woman (Ensemble Studio Theatre, New York, 2006) as Emma
- Stairway to Paradise (New York City Center, 2007)
- Marguerite (Original London production, 2008) as Marguerite
- Chicago (Cambridge Theatre, 2009) as Roxie Hart
- Blithe Spirit (Apollo Theatre, 2011) as Elvira
- Side by Side by Sondheim (Theatre Royal, Sydney, 2012) Headliner
- Guys and Dolls (Concert version, Cadogan Hall, 2012) as Adelaide
- Billy Elliot (West End cast, Victoria Palace Theatre, 2014–2016) as Mrs.Wilkinson
- Chicago (West End revival, Phoenix Theatre, 2018) as Mama Morton
- Children Of Eden (30th anniversary concert, Cadogan Hall, 2021) as The Snake
- Passion (Hope Mill Theatre, revival, 2022) as Fosca
- 42nd Street (West End revival, 2023–2024) as Dorothy Brock
- Cabaret (West End revival, 2025-2026) as Fräulein Schneider

== Olivier nominations ==
Henshall has been nominated five times for the UK's most prestigious theatre award, the Laurence Olivier Award, winning once.

- 1993 Best Actress in a Musical for Crazy for You – nominated
- 1995 Best Actress in a Musical for She Loves Me – won
- 1998 Best Actress in a Musical for Chicago – nominated
- 2002 Best Actress in a Musical for Peggy Sue Got Married – nominated
- 2009 Best Actress in a Musical for Marguerite – nominated

== Publications ==
- Henshall, Ruthie; Bowling, Daniel (2012). So You Want to Be in Musicals?. London: Nick Hern Books. ISBN 9781848421509.

== Discography ==
Year	Title	Role	Notes
1990	The Making of Miss Saigon	Ellen	
1995	Les Misérables: The Dream Cast in Concert	Fantine	
1998	Hey, Mr. Producer!	Herself	
2001	Putting It Together: Direct from Broadway	The Young Woman	Final performance
2003	Some Enchanted Evening: Richard Rodgers Tribute Gala	Herself	
2004	Broadway – The Golden Age, By the Legends Who Were There	Herself	
2004	A Christmas Carol	Mrs. Scrooge (Scrooge's Mother)	
2005	Voices For Darfur	Herself	Charitable performance
2006	Lesley Garrett: Music from the Movies	Herself	

== Solo albums ==
- I've Loved these Days
- The Ruthie Henshall Album
- Pilgrim
- Ruthie Henshall Sings Gershwin

== Guest vocals and compilations ==
- I Love Musicals
- Sondheim – The Stephen Sondheim Album
- Showstoppers: Dudu Fisher
- Brent Barrett: The Kander and Ebb Album

== Cast recordings ==
- 1991: Children of Eden (Original London cast)
- 1993: Crazy for You (Original London cast)
- 1994: She Loves Me (1994 London revival cast)
- 1995: Miss Saigon (1995 studio cast)
- 1995: Les Misérables 10th Anniversary Concert
- 1997: Godspell (1993 London studio cast)
- 1998: She Loves Me (1994 London cast)
- 1998: Divorce Me, Darling! (1997 Chichester cast)
- 1998: Annie (London studio cast)
- 1998: Chicago – The Musical (1998 London cast)
- 1998: Hey, Mr. Producer!
- 1999: Miss Saigon (1995 studio cast – highlights)
- 2001: Ziegfeld Follies of 1936
- 2004: A Christmas Carol (Original soundtrack from the Hallmark TV production)
- 2008: Marguerite (Original London cast recording)
