= Michael Ball stage credits =

This article includes the stage credits of Michael Ball. Listed are all theatre roles and special events in chronological order.

== Theatre ==
Theatre
Year	Title	Role	Notes
1984	Godspell	John the Baptist / Judas Iscariot	Aberystwyth Arts Centre, Wales; 14 July 1984 – 25 August 1984
1985	The Pirates of Penzance	Frederick, the Pirate Apprentice	Manchester Opera House; Summer Season 1985
1985	Les Misérables	Marius Pontmercy	Barbican Arts Centre, London; 8 October 1985 – December 1985
1985-1986	Les Misérables	Marius Pontmercy	Palace Theatre, London; 4 December 1985 – October 1986
1987-1988	The Phantom of the Opera	Raoul, Vicomte de Chagny	Her Majesty's Theatre, London; 12 October 1987 – 10 October 1988
1989-1990	Aspects of Love	Alex Dillingham	Prince of Wales Theatre, London; 17 April 1989 – January 1990
1990	Aspects of Love	Alex Dillingham	Broadhurst Theatre, Broadway; 8 April – 29 September 1990
1991	Sunset Boulevard	Joe Gillis	Sydmonton Court; 1991
1995	Les Misérables: The Dream Cast in Concert	Marius Pontmercy	Royal Albert Hall; October 1995
1996	Passion	Giorgio Bachetti	Theatre Royal, Plymouth; 17–24 February 1996; Palace Theatre, Manchester; 27 February – 2 March 1996; Theatre Royal, Nottingham; 4–9 March 1996
1996	Passion	Giorgio Bachetti	Queen's Theatre, London; 13 March – 28 September 1996
1997	Passion	Giorgio Bachetti	Golders Green Hippodrome, London; 12–15 June 1997
2001	Alone Together – One man show	The Performer	Donmar Warehouse, London; 17–29 September 2001
2002-2003	Chitty Chitty Bang Bang	Caractacus Potts	London Palladium, London; 19 March 2002 – 19 July 2003
2004	Sunset Boulevard	Joe Gillis	Cork Opera House, Ireland; April 2004
2004	Alone Together – One man show	The Performer	Theatre Royal Haymarket, London; 27 September – 9 October 2004
2004	Les Misérables – Concert	Jean Valjean	Windsor Castle, Berkshire; 18 November 2004
2005	The Woman in White	Count Fosco	Palace Theatre, London; 10 February – 30 April 2005
2005	Patience	Reginald Bunthorne	New York City Opera, New York City; 10 September – 5 October 2005
2005-2006	The Woman in White	Count Fosco	Marquis Theatre, Broadway; 28 October – 19 February 2006
2006	The Rocky Horror Show	Frank-N-Furter	Royal Court Theatre, London; 3 May 2006
2007	Kismet	Haji / The Poet	London Coliseum ENO, London; 25 June – 14 July 2007
2007-2009	Hairspray	Edna Turnblad	Shaftesbury Theatre, London; 11 October 2007 – 25 July 2009
2010-2011	Hairspray – UK Tour	Edna Turnblad	Wales Millennium Centre, Cardiff; 30 March – 24 April 2010; Clyde Auditorium, Glasgow; 28 April – 8 May 2010; Mayflower Theatre, Southampton; 11–29 May 2010; Manchester Opera House; 13–31 July 2010; Grand Canal Theatre, Dublin; 16–27 November 2010; Edinburgh Playhouse; 14 December 2010 – 9 January 2011; New Wimbledon Theatre, London; 15–26 March 2011; Bristol Hippodrome; 12–30 April 2011
2011	Sweeney Todd: The Demon Barber of Fleet Street	Sweeney Todd	Chichester Festival Theatre, West Sussex; 24 September 2011 – 5 November 2011
2012	Sweeney Todd: The Demon Barber of Fleet Street	Sweeney Todd	Adelphi Theatre, London; 10 March – 22 September 2012
2015	Mack and Mabel	Mack Sennett	Chichester Festival Theatre, West Sussex; 13 July – 5 September 2015
2015	Mack and Mabel – UK Tour	Mack Sennett	Theatre Royal, Plymouth; 1 October 2015 – 10 October 2015; Manchester Opera House; 12–24 October 2015; Bord Gáis Energy Theatre, Dublin; 27 October – 7 November 2015; Edinburgh Playhouse; 10 November 2015 – 21 November 2015; Theatre Royal, Nottingham; 23–28 November 2015; Wales Millennium Centre, Cardiff; 1–6 December 2015
2018	Chess	Anatoly Sergievsky	London Coliseum ENO, London; 26 April – 2 June 2018
2019	Les Misérables – The All-Star Staged Concert	Inspector Javert	Gielgud Theatre, London; 10 August – 30 November 2019
2020	Les Misérables – The All-Star Staged Concert	Inspector Javert	Sondheim Theatre, London; 5–16 December 2020
2021	Hairspray	Edna Turnblad	London Coliseum, London; 22 June – 29 September 2021
2023	Aspects of Love	Sir George Dillingham	Lyric Theatre, London; 12 May - 19 August 2023
2024-2025	Les Misérables – The Arena Spectacular World Tour	Inspector Javert	SSE Arena Belfast; 19–28 September 2024; SSE Hydro Arena; 3–6 October 2024; Sheffield Arena; 10–13 October 2024; P & J Live Arena; 17–19 October 2024; Manchester Arena; 27–29 December 2024; Newcastle Arena; 2–5 January 2025; International Convention Centre Sydney; 30 April - 11 May 2025; Rod Laver Arena; 14–25 May 2025; Brisbane Entertainment Centre; 28 May - 1 June 2025
2026	Jesus Christ Superstar	King Herod	Theatre Royal, Drury Lane; 23 November – 5 December 2026
2027	Charlie and the Chocolate Factory	Willy Wonka	London Coliseum, London; 4 June – 18 September 2027

== Special Events ==
Special Events
Year	Title	Role	Theatre and date	Notes
1988	Aspects of Love Preview	Alex Dillingham	Sydmonton Festival, Hampshire; 9 July 1988	Preview
1988	The Phantom of the Opera Charity Gala	Raoul, Vicomte de Chagny	Her Majesty's Theatre, London; 31 July 1988	Charity Gala
1989	Aspects of Love Charity Gala	Alex Dillingham	Prince of Wales Theatre, London; 5 April 1989	Charity Gala Premiere
1989	Celebrating Sondheim	Performer – Sweeney Todd: The Demon Barber of Fleet Street & Follies	Royal Festival Hall, London; 17 September 1989	Available on CD
1989	Royal Variety Performance	Performer – Aspects of Love	London Palladium, London; 20 November 1989	TV broadcast
1991	Sunset Boulevard Preview	Joe Gillis	Sydmonton Festival, Hampshire; Summer 1991	Preview
1991	Royal Variety Performance	Performer – Les Misérables & The Phantom of the Opera	Victoria Palace Theatre, London; 30 November 1991	TV broadcast
1992	Royal Variety Performance	Performer	Dominion Theatre, London; 7 December 1992	TV broadcast
1993	Michael Ball – ROC Charity Concert	Principal performer	Dominion Theatre, London; 26 September 1993	Charity Concert in aid of ROC: Research into Ovarian Cancer
1995	The Music and Songs of Andrew Lloyd Webber	Host & Performer	National Indoor Arena, Birmingham; 27 May 1995	BBC Radio 2 broadcast
1995	Les Misérables – 10th Anniversary Concert	Marius Pontmercy	Royal Albert Hall, London; 8 October 1995	Available on CD & DVD
1995	Michael Ball – ROC Charity Concert	Principal performer	Theatre Royal Haymarket, London; 26 November 1995	Charity Concert in aid of ROC: Research into Ovarian Cancer
1997	Royal Variety Performance	Performer	Victoria Palace Theatre, London; 1 December 1997	TV broadcast
1998	Andrew Lloyd Webber: The Royal Albert Hall Celebration	Performer – Jesus Christ Superstar, The Phantom of the Opera, Whistle Down the Wind & Aspects of Love	Royal Albert Hall, London; 7 April 1998	Available on DVD
1998	Sondheim Tonight	Performer – Follies & Passion	Barbican Arts Centre, London; 17 May 1998	Available on CD
1998	Hey, Mr. Producer!	Performer – Follies, The Phantom of the Opera & Les Misérables	Lyceum Theatre, London; 7 & 8 June 1998	Available on CD & DVD
1998	Michael Ball – ROC Charity Concert	Principal performer	Theatre Royal, Drury Lane, London; 22 November 1998	Charity Concert in aid of ROC: Research into Ovarian Cancer
2001	Rhapsody in Rock	Guest performer	Royal Albert Hall, London; 11 November 2001	
2002	Chitty Chitty Bang Bang Charity Gala	Caractacus Potts	London Palladium, London; 9 April 2002	Charity Gala Premiere
2002	Michael Ball at The London Palladium	Principal performer	London Palladium, London; 1 September 2002	Charity Concert in aid of ROC: Research into Ovarian Cancer
2004	Sunset Boulevard – In Concert	Joe Gillis	Cork Opera House, Ireland; 23 & 24 April 2004	BBC Radio 2 broadcast
2004	Les Misérables – Royal Command Performance	Jean Valjean	Windsor Castle, Berkshire; 18 November 2004	Royal Command Performance
2004	Opening of Wales Millennium Centre Gala	Performer – Mack & Mabel & More	Wales Millennium Centre, Cardiff; 28 November 2004	TV broadcast
2005	Night of 1000 Voices	Performer	Royal Albert Hall, London; 5 May 2005	Charity concert in aid of the Caron Keating Foundation and the Alan Jay Lerner Fund For Cancer Research.
2006	The Rocky Horror Show Tribute Show	Frank-N-Furter	Royal Court Theatre, London; 3 May 2006	Available on DVD
2006	Michael Ball Celebrates Anthony Newley	Host & Performer	Hackney Empire, London; 31 August 2006	BBC Radio 2 broadcast
2006	Les Misérables – 21st Anniversary Celebration	Original Cast – Marius Pontmercy	Queen's Theatre, London; 7 October 2006	
2007	Prom 58: An Evening with Michael Ball	Principal performer	Royal Albert Hall, London; 28 August 2007	BBC Proms Concert; TV and BBC Radio 3 broadcast
2007	Royal Variety Performance	Performer – Hairspray	Liverpool Empire Theatre; 3 December 2007	TV broadcast
2009	The South Bank Show Awards	Performer	The Dorchester Hotel, London; 20 January 2009	TV broadcast
2010	Elvis Forever	Performer	Hyde Park, London; 12 September 2010	BBC Radio 2 broadcast
2010	Les Misérables – 25th Anniversary Concert	Original Cast – Marius Pontmercy	The O2 Arena; 3 October 2010	Available on DVD
2010	An Evening with Michael Ball and Friends	Principal performer	Prince of Wales Theatre, London; 10 October 2010	Charity concert in aid of the Shooting Star Children's Hospice
2011	The Laurence Olivier Awards	Host	Theatre Royal, Drury Lane, London; 13 March 2011	TV and BBC Radio 2 broadcast
2012	The Laurence Olivier Awards	Host	Royal Opera House, Covent Garden, London; 15 April 2012	TV and BBC Radio 2 broadcast
2012	Les Misérables red carpet event	Host	Leicester Square, London; 5 December 2012	TV broadcast
2013	不说再见 See You Soon Gala Concert	Performer	Shanghai Grand Theatre, Shanghai; 14 February 2013	TV broadcast
2013	Andrew Lloyd Webber – 40 Musical Years	Host & Performer	London; 16 March&17, 2013	TV broadcast
2013	The Laurence Olivier Awards	Performer & Award Winner	Royal Opera House, Covent Garden, London; 28 April 2013	TV and BBC Radio 2 broadcast
2013	Diamonds Are Forever: The Don Black Songbook	Performer	Royal Festival Hall, London; 3 October 2013	TV broadcast
2013	Michael Ball and Friends in Concert	Principal Performer	Phoenix Theatre, London; 8 December 2013	Charity concert in aid of the Shooting Star Children's Hospice
2016	The Laurence Olivier Awards	Host & Performer	Royal Opera House, Covent Garden, London; 3 April 2016	TV broadcast
