= Marriott Theatre =

Theatre in Lincolnshire, Illinois, United States

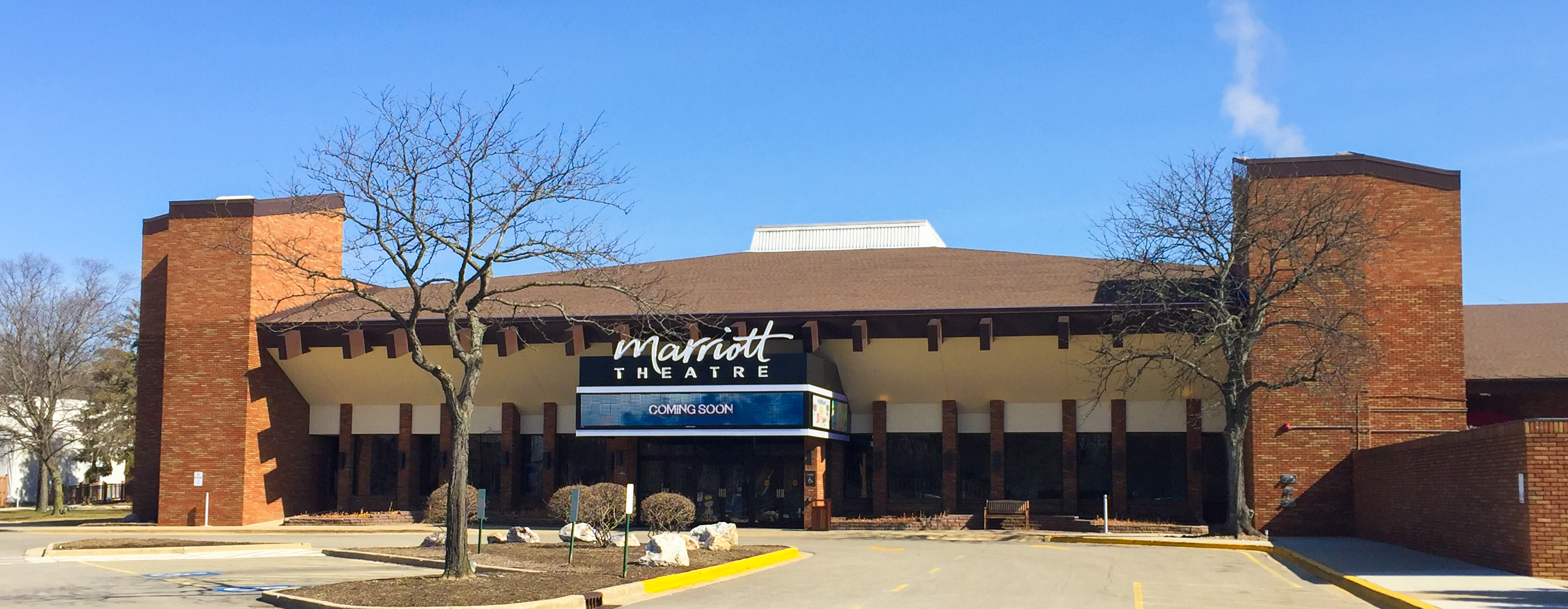
- Marriott Theatre, April 2018
- Interactive map of Marriott Theatre
- Former names: Drury Lane North Theatre
- Location: 10 Marriott Dr, Lincolnshire, Illinois 60069
- Coordinates: 42.194°N 87.928°W
- Owner: Marriott International, Inc.
- Capacity: 838
- Event: Theatre

Construction
- Opened: April 1, 1975

Website
- www.marriotttheatre.com

The Marriott Theatre is a regional theatre in Lincolnshire, Illinois, outside of Chicago. Attached to the Marriott Lincolnshire Resort, the theatre produces an average of five musicals each year, presented in the round, as well as productions aimed at younger audiences. A small, live orchestra provides accompaniment.

== History ==
Founded in December 1975, The Marriott Theatre has presented more than 170 musicals and is currently led by Executive Producer Peter Blair and Artistic Director Peter Marston Sullivan. It is the most subscribed musical theatre in the country.

The original executive producer, Tony DeSantis, viewed the venue as a place for star performers. When Kary Walker took over in 1979, he switched to producing musicals, which have been the primary productions of the theatre ever since.

The Marriott Theatre has presented more than 3,000 professional actors in classic American musical theatre, new musicals, and "re-thought" musicals. Broadway has long considered The Marriott Theatre a prime venue for launching shows into the regional market with premiere productions of A Chorus Line, Chess, Baby, Grand Hotel, They're Playing Our Song, The Goodbye Girl, The First, Miss Saigon, Cats, Sunset Boulevard, Beauty and the Beast, Thoroughly Modern Millie, The Producers and Little Women.

A founding member of the National Alliance for Musical Theatre, The Marriott Theatre fosters artists in creating new works for the stage. The result has been a string of American and World Premieres including Matador, which subsequently played London's West End; Annie Warbucks, launching a national tour and opening off-Broadway in New York to rave reviews; Phantom of the Country Palace, Grover's Corners, Maury Yeston's History Loves Company (1991), Windy City, The New Yorkers, Queen of the Stardust Ballroom, Peggy Sue Got Married, Once Upon a Time in New Jersey, The All Night Strut, A Fascinatin' Rhythm, Married Alive, The Bowery Boys, For The Boys, and Hero.

Marriott's Theatre for Young Audiences has presented numerous original works as well as classic fairy tales. To date, Marriott's Theatre for Young Audiences has presented more than 45 productions. Every year, these musicals introduce more than 100,000 children to live theatre. In all, The Marriott Theatre attracts more than 400,000 people to Lincolnshire each year.

== Shows ==
1980

- Barbara Eden
- Phyllis Diller
- Rodgers & Hart
- The Sound of Music
- Hay Fever
- Cabaret
- Kiss Me, Kate
- Oliver!

1981

- Man of La Mancha
- A Little Night Music
- South Pacific
- They're Playing Our Song world premiere

1982

- Fiddler on the Roof
- Kismet
- Little Me world premiere
- Brigadoon

1983

- Shenandoah
- Give My Regards to Broadway world premiere
- Chicago
- Gypsy: A Musical Fable

1984

- Windy City
- The Boys from Syracuse
- A Day in Hollywood / A Night in the Ukraine
- Carousel

1985

- Joseph and the Amazing Technicolor Dreamcoat
- Startime world premiere
- A Chorus Line
- Hello, Dolly!

1986

- Camelot
- Baby world premiere
- The King and I

1987

- The Wiz
- 1776
- Grover's Corners world premiere
- My Fair Lady

1988

- Evita
- Do Black Patent Leather Shoes Really Reflect Up?
- Cabaret
- West Side Story
- Peter Pan

1989

- Big River
- 70, Girls, 70
- Matador world premiere
- Grease
- Funny Girl

1990

- Chess, a new version. Directed by David H. Bell and starring Susie McMonagle, David Studwell and Kim Strauss, it featured a reworking of Richard Nelson's New York script. Bell's version has since been performed in Sacramento and Atlanta as well.
- Into the Woods
- Pump Boys and Dinettes
- South Pacific
- Me and My Girl

1991

- Encore world premiere
- Brigadoon
- Sweet Charity
- History Loves Company world premiere
- Anything Goes

1992

- Annie Warbucks premiere
- Little Shop of Horrors
- Arthur premiere
- Grand Hotel
- The Sound of Music

1993

- The First: A Musical premiere
- Oklahoma!
- Hot Mikado special presentation
- Sweeney Todd
- 42nd Street

1994

- Windy City encore presentation
- Phantom of the Country Palace premiere
- The Goodbye Girl special presentation
- La Cage aux Folles
- The Music Man

1995

- Hello, Dolly!
- Ms. Cinderella premiere
- Dreamgirls
- Heartbeats premiere
- Eleanor premiere

1996

- And the World Goes 'Round
- The New Yorkers
- The Best Little Whorehouse in Texas
- How to Succeed in Business Without Really Trying
- Singin' in the Rain

1997

- The Will Rogers Follies
- Kismet
- Nunsense
- Baby
- Guys & Dolls

1998

- Elmer Gantry premiere
- Gypsy
- I Love You, You're Perfect, Now Change
- Queen/Stardust Ballroom premiere
- Finian's Rainbow
- The Wizard of Oz

1999

- Do Black Patent Leather Shoes Really Reflect Up?
- Victor/Victoria
- Houdini premiere
- Peggy Sue Got Married premiere
- Phantom

2000

- Joseph and the Amazing Technicolor Dreamcoat
- The Pirates of Penzance
- Pump Boys & Dinettes
- Evita
- The King & I

2001

- Big River
- Mame
- The Taffetas
- Miss Saigon special presentation
- Bye Bye Birdie

2002

- Honk!
- Damn Yankees
- 1776
- Carousel
- Funny Girl

2003

- Cats special presentation
- Hot Mikado encore presentation
- Forever Plaid
- Show Boat
- Annie Get Your Gun

2004

- West Side Story
- The Pajama Game
- Ain't Misbehavin'
- Sunset Boulevard special presentation
- Beauty and the Beast special presentation

2005

- Swing!
- Brigadoon
- A Funny Thing Happened on the Way to the Forum
- Footloose
- Oliver!

2006

- Thoroughly Modern Millie
- State Fair
- Once Upon a Time in New Jersey premiere
- Into the Woods
- All Night Strut premiere

2007

- Grease
- Shenandoah special presentation
- Married Alive_{^{premiere}}
- The Producers
- Little Women

2008

- Les Misérables
- Nunsense
- The Full Monty
- All Shook Up special presentation
- The Bowery Boys ^{_{world premiere}}

2009

- Joseph and the Amazing Technicolor Dreamcoat
- The 25th Annual Putnam County Spelling Bee
- The Light in the Piazza
- Hairspray
- My Fair Lady

2010

- Fiddler on the Roof
- The Drowsy Chaperone
- Once on This Island
- A Chorus Line
- The Music Man

2011

- Guys and Dolls
- 42nd Street
- SHOUT! The Mod Musical
- For the Boys world premiere
- White Christmas

2012

- Legally Blonde: The Musical
- The Pirates of Penzance
- Hero world premiere
- Dreamgirls
- My One and Only

2013

- Now and Forever: The Music of Andrew Lloyd Webber
- South Pacific
- I Love You, You're Perfect, Now Change
- 9 to 5: The Musical
- Mary Poppins

2014

- Cabaret
- Cats
- Godspell
- On the Town
- The King and I

2015

- La Cage aux Folles
- Anything Goes
- City of Angels
- October Sky
- Elf: The Musical

2016

- Sister Act
- Evita
- Man of La Mancha
- How to Succeed in Business Without Really Trying
- Singin' in the Rain

2017

- Mamma Mia!
- She Loves Me
- The Bridges of Madison County
- Honeymoon in Vegas
- Newsies

2018

- Ragtime!
- Oklahoma!
- Murder for Two
- Sweet Charity
- Irving Berlin's Holiday Inn

2019

- Million Dollar Quartet
- Footloose
- Darling Grenadine
- Something Rotten!
- Oliver!

2020 The 2020 season was interrupted by the COVID-19 pandemic and continued once it was determined to be safe to congregate.

- Grease

2021 (A continuation of the announced 2020 season)

- Kiss Me, Kate
- And the World Goes 'Round

2022 (A continuation of the announced 2020 season with two additional shows)

- West Side Story
- The Sound of Music
- Hello, Dolly!
- A Christmas Story: The Musical

2023

- Big Fish
- Damn Yankees
- Buddy: The Buddy Holly Story
- Gypsy
- Beautiful: The Carole King Musical

2024

- In the Heights
- The Music Man
- Beehive: The 60's Musical
- 1776
- White Christmas

2025

- Joseph and the Amazing Technicolor Dreamcoat
- Titanic
- Always Something There world premiere
- Catch Me If You Can
- Million Dollar Quartet Christmas

2026

- Little Shop of Horrors
- Heartbreak Hotel
- A Little Night Music
- Come from Away
- Frozen

2027

- Pippin
- A Gentleman's Guide to Love and Murder
- Almost Heaven
- Les Misérables
- The Wiz
