= Philip Quast =

Australian actor, singer (born 1957)

Philip Quast AM
- Born: Philip Mark Quast; 30 July 1957 (age 69); Tamworth, New South Wales, Australia
- Education: National Institute of Dramatic Art (BFA)
- Occupations: Actor; singer
- Years active: 1981–present
- Notable work: Les Misérables; Play School; Young Doctors; Sons and Daughters; Sunday in the Park with George
- Spouse: Carol Quast (m. 1981)
- Children: 3

Philip Mark Quast AM (born 30 July 1957) is an Australian actor and Baritone singer. He has won the Laurence Olivier Award for Best Actor in a Musical three times, making him the first actor to have three wins in that category. He is perhaps best known for his role as Inspector Javert in the stage musical Les Misérables and in the Les Misérables: The Dream Cast in Concert.

He is also well-known for numerous other theatre roles, notable ones being Georges Seurat/George in Sunday in the Park with George (which won him a Laurence Olivier Award), Archibald Craven and Dr. Neville Craven in The Secret Garden, Judge Turpin in Sweeney Todd: The Demon Barber of Fleet Street, George Banks in Mary Poppins, Georges in La Cage aux Folles, Juan Peron in Evita, Fred Anderson in A Christmas Carol, and The Wolf and Cinderella's Prince in Into the Woods. He returned to Les Misérables as The Bishop of Digne at Radio City Music Hall in July and August 2026.

He is also known for appearances in film and for his roles in television shows such as Ultraviolet, Brides of Christ, and Play School.

== Early life and education ==
Quast, one of three children, was born in 1957 in Tamworth, New South Wales. His family lived and worked on a mixed, but predominantly turkey, farm. He graduated from the National Institute of Dramatic Art in 1979.

== Acting career ==
=== 1980s ===
==== Theatre ====
After graduating from NIDA in 1979 Quast began his career in the resident acting company of the State Theatre Company of South Australia. In the early 1980s he appeared in plays such as The Mystery Plays of Wakefield, Three Sisters, On the Wallaby, Pericles, A Month in the Country, As You Like It, Pygmalion, A Hard God, No End of Blame, The Threepenny Opera, Shark Infested Waters, Candide with Nimrod Theatre Company, and a musical adaption of Carmen which he debuted with the Melbourne Theatre Company.

==== Les Misérables ====
Quast shot to prominence in 1987 as Javert in the original Australian production of Les Misérables, winning him a Sydney Critic Award and a Mo Award. In 1989, he traveled to London to reprise the role on the West End stage. Quast never expected to gain such a prominent role, going to the auditions hoping simply for a place in the chorus. Unable to sight-read music, he walked off the stage at the audition but was called back by Claude-Michel Schönberg and eventually given the part as Javert.

Quast credits much of his success as Javert to stage director Trevor Nunn. "Javert for me is not the Wicked Witch of the West," Quast has said. "In fact, there is very little material to work with in the script. Trevor would say things in passing like 'Have you read the Ten Commandments recently?' That's all he would say. If you're thirsty enough, you can follow it up ... there was the whole basis of our legal system and the explanation for the whole of Les Mis. For me, that's inspired directing. That's why he's such an awesome man."

When playing Javert, Quast gained a reputation as a perfectionist and began experiencing intense bouts of stagefright. "I had a terrible time," he said. "It took me a month to get over it. At one stage I wasn't sleeping at all but lying awake planning speeches to the audience about being sorry and could I start again."

==== Film and television ====
In 1981, Quast began appearing as a presenter on the Australian children's show Play School, a program he would return to on-and-off again for 17 years.

From 1982 to 1983, he appeared in a recurring role as Dr Rod Hawkins in Australian medical soap opera The Young Doctors for 20 episodes. From 1984 to 1985, he had another recurring role as Bob 'Mitch' Mitchell in Australian drama soap opera Sons and Daughters for 30 episodes. Quast appeared in several miniseries including Colour in the Creek (1985), Flight into Hell, Fields of Fire (both 1987) and Cassidy (1989). He also made guest appearances in Patrol Boat, A Country Practice and Special Squad.

Quast also appeared in several Australian films including Emoh Ruo (1985), Army Wives (1986, TV movie), Around the World in Eighty Ways, To Market To Market (both 1987) and The First Kangaroos (1988).

=== 1990s ===
==== Theatre ====
Quast's stage success continued as he won the coveted role of Georges Seurat and his act 2 counterpart George in the original London production of Stephen Sondheim's Sunday in the Park with George for the Royal National Theatre.

In 1991 he won his first Laurence Olivier Award for Best Actor in a Musical as Georges Seurat / George. Quast was under a large amount of stress when preparing for Sunday in the Park with George, as he struggled to master Sondheim's complicated musical scores (Sondheim told him: "you don't play tennis against people you can beat."), learn to paint and sketch for the play, all while awaiting the birth of his first son, who was due five days after opening night.

In 1993 he returned to Australia to play in Sydney Theatre Company productions of William Shakespeare's Coriolanus and Sondheim's Into the Woods, in which he played The Wolf/Cinderella's Prince. He then played Dunois in Bernard Shaw’s Saint Joan in the West End and on a UK tour in 1994. In 1994–96 he spent two seasons with the Royal Shakespeare Company, performing as Fred/Chorus in A Christmas Carol, and King of Navarre in Shakespeare's Love's Labour's Lost, as well as Lodovico in The White Devil, Banquo in Macbeth, and Achilles in Troilus and Cressida. Before returning for a second season with the RSC, he spent some time back in Australia, performing in the national tour of The Secret Garden as Dr. Neville Craven – along with Anthony Warlow and Marina Prior.

==== Film and television ====
Quast continued to appear in both Australian and British television roles throughout the 1990s. In 1995 he starred in the miniseries The Damnation of Harvey McHugh as The Minister, Michael Muldoon for 13 episodes. From 1995 to 1996 he appeared as Simon Lennox in British drama series The Governor for 4 episodes, and in 1998 he played Father Pearse J. Harman in 6 episodes of Ultraviolet. In 1999 he played Cornelius in a 1999 miniseries adaptation of Cleopatra. He also had guest roles in Police Rescue, the miniseries Brides of Christ, Crime Story and Inspector Morse.

He had a sole film role in the 1990s, playing Bradley in 1999 thriller The Fall.

=== 2000s ===
==== Musical theatre ====
Quast played the part of Javert on the Les Misérables Complete Symphonic Recording, and in Hey, Mr. Producer, a concert in honour of Sir Cameron Mackintosh.

Though mainly a baritone, Quast has played some roles written for tenors, namely George (see above), Candide, and Archibald Craven in The Secret Garden. Although he is known for his serious roles, he has also performed comedic parts, such as his 2004 appearance as the pompous Miles Gloriosus in a limited run revival of A Funny Thing Happened on the Way to the Forum at the Royal National Theatre.

Quast more recently played the supporting role of Juan Peron in Andrew Lloyd Webber's 2006 production of Evita at the Adelphi Theatre in London. He was nominated for an Olivier award for this role. In July 2007, Quast performed the role of Judge Turpin in a concert version of Sweeney Todd at London's Royal Festival Hall.

He was most recently in the Menier Chocolate Factory production of Jerry Herman's La Cage aux Folles as Georges. Quast rejoined the cast of La Cage on 4 May 2009 with Roger Allam. Coincidentally, both actors have performed in the role of Javert in Les Misérables. From July 2010, he played Mr. Banks in the Australian premiere production of Mary Poppins at Melbourne's Her Majesty’s Theatre, a part Cameron Mackintosh offered to him in the bathroom of The Ivy in London. He won the 2010 Victorian Green Room Award (Melbourne's top theatre awards) for Best Supporting Actor in a Musical for his performance. He also won the 2011 Helpmann Award for Best Featured Actor in a Musical for Mary Poppins.

In March 2014, New York audiences were treated to a special limited engagement of Sweeney Todd at Lincoln Center's Avery Fisher Hall. Quast, in his New York stage debut, performed as Judge Turpin, with Bryn Terfel as Sweeney Todd and Emma Thompson as Mrs. Lovett. The show was scheduled to be broadcast as part of Live at Lincoln Center's television special in September 2014.

In July and August 2026, Quast joined the world concert tour of Les Misérables as The Bishop of Digne which included performing at Radio City Music Hall. In July 2026, he performed in an encore performance of the song "Stars" along fellow past and current Javert actors Jordan Donica, Bradley Jaden, and Jeremy Secomb after a performance of Les Misérables.

==== Theatre ====
In 2003, Quast appeared as Antonio in Shakespeare's The Merchant of Venice, directed by Gale Edwards and as Trigorin in Chekhov's The Seagull, directed by Steven Pimlott, both at the Chichester Festival Theatre. In 2012, he played the role of Sir Humphrey Appleby in an Australian production of Yes, Prime Minister. In August/September 2012, he performed the role of Walter Burns in Melbourne Theatre Company’s production of His Girl Friday. In November 2013 he joined Hugo Weaving and Richard Roxburgh in Sydney Theatre Company’s production of Samuel Beckett's Waiting For Godot. In May/June 2014, Quast played the role of Pastor Manders in Henrik Ibsen’s play Ghosts at the Melbourne Theatre Company directed by Gale Edwards.

==== Film and television ====
Quast has appeared in numerous television roles throughout the 2000s. In 2001 he played Michael Fielding MP in Australian satirical comedy series Corridors of Power and Tim Price in 7 episodes of Australian comedy/drama series Bed of Roses in 2010. In 2016 he played the role of Senior Constable Gordon in superhero parody series The Justice Lease as well as Lincoln Priest in legal series Janet King. In 2018 Quast appeared as Arthur Appleyard in the miniseries reimagining of the 1975 Australian Peter Weir classic Picnic at Hanging Rock. In 2020, he had two further television roles – as Professor Quentin Ratchett in comedy/drama series Operation Buffalo and as Phillip Walford in Between Two Worlds. Since 2024 he has been playing Dr Sandy Green in Australian-Indian romance/drama series Four Years Later.

He also guested in several British series including medical drama Holby City, murder mystery series Midsomer Murders, and crime drama series Silent Witness. He also had a guest role in Australian TV drama Miss Fisher’s Murder Mysteries.

Quast appeared in several 2000s film roles. He played Richard (opposite Caroline Goodall) in British film Me & Mrs Jones (2002). He appeared as Carl alongside Wendy Hughes and Susie Porter in The Caterpillar Wish (2006), and the following year played Ronnie opposite Rebecca Gibney in Clubland. He portrayed Saddam Hussein in 2011 internationally released film The Devil's Double (alongside Dominic Cooper). Quast was in the 2015 political newsroom drama Truth playing real life politician Ben Barnes, alongside an all-star cast including Cate Blanchett and Robert Redford. He also had a part in the 2016 Mel Gibson-directed war biopic Hacksaw Ridge as Judge, which also starred Andrew Garfield, Sam Worthington, Hugo Weaving and Rachel Griffiths. In 2022 he played Tanner Blue in Dark Noise.

While Quast has expressed a desire to continue working in TV and film, and teach acting, he no longer intends to act in plays or musicals, because of the heavy schedule involved.

== Personal life ==
Quast and his wife Carol have three sons (Edwin, Harry and Toby). He also teaches at the National Institute of Dramatic Art in Sydney, Australia. During the COVID-19 pandemic, Quast continued teaching through Zoom calls.

Quast married Carol in 1981 and they were married for almost ten years before having the first of their three sons. He has been noted for his humble nature, stating he doesn't seek after fame and is concerned that success is measured by notoriety instead of the respect of one's peers. He doesn't keep any of his awards, instead sending them to his parents' home in Australia.

Quast was named as one of the 25 Most Beautiful People for 1996 in Who Weekly magazine. In an article for the magazine he said, "The problem with this business is that you have to supposedly look as good as you can all the time. And I hate that. My idea of doing my hair is sticking it out of the window of a car when it's wet."

A baritone, Quast has been universally applauded by critics for his singing voice, which has been described as "warm", and "glorious." He was named by British newspaper The Stage as "one of the most notable singing actors to come along in years".

Quast has a strong passion for fishing, and he spent his time during the COVID-19 pandemic fishing, cooking, pickling and preserving.

== Awards ==
Year	Work	Award	Category	Result
1988	Philip Quast	Mo Awards	Male Musical Theatre Performer of the Year	Won
1988	Les Misérables	Sydney Theatre Critics Awards	Best Actor of the Year	Won
1991	Sunday in the Park with George	1991 Laurence Olivier Awards	Best Actor in a Musical	Won
1993	Into the Woods	Sydney Theatre Critics Awards	Best Actor in a Leading Role	Won
1993	Philip Quast	Mo Awards	Male Musical Theatre Performer of the Year	Won
1993	Philip Quast	Mo Awards	Musical Theatre Performer of the Year	Won
1998	The Fix	1998 Laurence Olivier Awards	Best Actor in a Musical	Won
2002	South Pacific	2002 Laurence Olivier Awards	Best Actor in a Musical	Won
2011	Mary Poppins	Green Room Awards	Male Artist in a Featured Role	Won
2011	Mary Poppins	Helpmann Awards	Best Actor in a Supporting Role in a Musical	Won
2022	Philip Quast	2022 Queen's Birthday Honours	Member of the Order of Australia for Significant service to the arts as a performer, mentor and educator	Honoured

== Musical cast recordings ==
Year	Title	Notes
1989	Les Misérables: The Complete Symphonic Recording	
1990	Paris	Studio Cast Recording
1995	The Secret Garden	Original Australian Cast Recording
1995	Les Misérables: The Dream Cast in Concert	
1997	The Fix	Original London Cast Recording
2001	South Pacific	Royal National Theatre Production – London Cast
2001	The Secret Garden	Original London Cast Recording
2002	Live at the Donmar	Philip Quast
2006	Evita	London Cast Recording
2011	Mary Poppins	Original Australian Cast Recording

== Filmography ==
=== Film ===
Year	Title	Role	Type
1985	Emoh Ruo	Les Tunkley	Feature film
1986	Army Wives	Peter	TV movie
1987	Around the World in Eighty Ways	Wally Davis	Feature film
1987	To Market To Market	Edward	Feature film
1988	The First Kangaroos	Alex 'Bluey' Burdon	Feature film
1995	Napoleon	Birdo (voice)	Feature film
1999	The Fall	Bradley	Feature film
2002	Me & Mrs Jones	Richard Bowden	TV movie
2006	The Caterpillar Wish	Carl Roberts	Feature film
2007	Clubland	Ronnie Stubbs	Feature film
2011	The Devil's Double	Saddam Hussein / Faoaz	Feature film
2015	Truth	Ben Barnes	Feature film
2016	Hacksaw Ridge	Judge	Feature film
2017	National Theatre Live: Follies	Benjamin Stone	TV movie
2022	Dark Noise	Tanner Blue	Feature film

=== Television ===
Year	Title	Role	Type
1981–96	Play School	Presenter	TV series, 2164 episodes
1982–83	The Young Doctors	Dr Rod Hawkins	TV series, 20 episodes
1983	Patrol Boat	Smith	TV series, season 2, episode 2: "Tango Victor"
1984	A Country Practice	Billy Webb	TV series, season 4, 2 episodes
1984	Special Squad	Jaeger	TV series, episode 8: "The Würzburg Link"
1984–85	Sons and Daughters	Bob 'Mitch' Mitchell	TV series, 30 episodes
1985	Colour in the Creek	Barney	Miniseries, 8 episodes
1987	Flight into Hell	Chris Gordon	Miniseries
1987	Fields of Fire	Albie	Miniseries, 2 episodes
1989	Cassidy	Sam East	Miniseries, 2 episodes
1991	Police Rescue	Bob Harrison	TV series, season 1, episode 1: "Mates"
1991	Brides of Christ	Ian McGregor	Miniseries, episode 3: "Ambrose"
1992	Crime Story	Terry Clark	TV series, episode 1: "All Good Friends - The Case of the Handless Corpse"
1995	The Damnation of Harvey McHugh	The Minister, Michael Muldoon	Miniseries, 13 episodes
1995	Great Performances	Javert	TV series, season 24, episode 10: "Les Misérables in Concert"
1995–96	The Governor	Simon Lennox	TV series, seasons 1–2, 4 episodes
1998	Ultraviolet	Father Pearse J. Harman	TV series, season 1, 6 episodes
1998	Inspector Morse	Mr Benfield	TV series, season 8, episode 4: "The Wench is Dead"
1999	Cleopatra	Cornelius	Miniseries, 2 episodes
2001	Corridors of Power	Michael Fielding MP	TV series, 6 episodes
2004	Midsomer Murders	Ross Villiers	TV series, season 7, episode 7: "Ghosts of Christmas Past"
2006	Holby City	Clayton Jones	TV series, season 8, episode 13: "Pride Before a Fall"
2008	Silent Witness	Leonid Polyak	TV series, season 12, 2 episodes
2010	Bed of Roses	Tim Price	TV series, season 2, 7 episodes
2014	Live from Lincoln Center	Judge Turpin	TV series, season 40, episode 1: "Sweeney Todd: The Demon Barber of Fleet Street - In Concert with the New York Philharmonic"
2015	Miss Fisher's Murder Mysteries	Dr. Hayden Samuels	TV series, season 3, episode 5: "Death & Hysteria"
2016	The Justice Lease	Senior Constable Gordon	TV series, season 2, 4 episodes
2016	Janet King	Lincoln Priest	TV series, season 2, 5 episodes
2018	Picnic at Hanging Rock	Arthur Appleyard	Miniseries, 6 episodes
2020	Operation Buffalo	Professor Quentin Ratchett	TV series, season 1, 4 episodes
2020	Between Two Worlds	Phillip Walford	TV series, season 1, 10 episodes
2024–	Four Years Later	Dr Sandy Green	TV series, season 1, 3 episodes

== Stage ==
Year	Title	Role	Theatre
1979	The Seagull		NIDA Theatre, Sydney
1979	The Beggar's Opera		NIDA Theatre, Sydney, Playhouse, Canberra
1979	The Ballad of the Sad Café	Circus Style Performer	NIDA Theatre, Sydney
1980	The Ship's Whistle	Hank / Governor's Aide / Lt Armstrong / Professor Kemp / Francis Jeffrey Dickens	Playhouse, Adelaide with Magpie Theatre Company
1980	The Mystery Plays of Wakefield		Playhouse, Adelaide with STCSA
1980	The Three Sisters	A Maid / Officers / Soldiers / Servants / Villagers / Wandering musicians	Playhouse, Adelaide with STCSA
1980	On the Wallaby	Jim / Boxcar Harry	Playhouse, Adelaide with STCSA
1980	Pericles, Prince of Tyre		Theatre 62, Adelaide with STCSA
1980	A Month in the Country	Aleksei Belyayev / Matvei	Playhouse, Adelaide with STCSA
1981	A Hard God	Jack	Playhouse, Adelaide with STCSA
1981	Buckley's!	Cop	Playhouse, Adelaide with STCSA
1981	Pygmalion	Freddie Eynsford-Hill	Playhouse, Adelaide with STCSA
1981	As You Like It	Charles / Jacques de Boys / Orlando / Sir Oliver Martext / Hymen	Theatre 62, Adelaide with STCSA
1981	The Revenger’s Tragedy	Hippolito	Playhouse, Adelaide with STCSA
1982	Candide	Candide	Seymour Centre, Sydney, Melbourne with Nimrod Theatre Company
1983	Song of the Seals	Jonah Fyshe	Playhouse, Adelaide with Magpie Theatre Company
1984	Carmen - Another Perspective		Russell Street Theatre, Melbourne with MTC
1985; 1987; 1989	Les Misérables	Inspector Javert	Theatre Royal, Sydney, Palace Theatre, West End
1986	The Marriage		Sydney Opera House, Space Theatre, Adelaide with Thalia Theatre Company
1986	Hamlet		Sydney Opera House, Space Theatre, Adelaide with Thalia Theatre Company
1988	A Stephen Sondheim Evening	Actor / Singer	Theatre Royal Sydney with Cameron Mackintosh
1990	Sunday in the Park with George	Georges Seurat / George	Royal National Theatre, West End
1990	Love Letters	Andrew Makepeace III	Sydney Opera House
1990	The Hunting of the Snark	The Bellman	The Hills Centre, Sydney with Jackson-Mayo Productions
1991; 1992	Les Misérables	Inspector Javert	Festival Theatre, Adelaide, Aotea Centre, Auckland, Palace Theatre, Manchester, U.K. tour
1993	Coriolanus	Aufidus	Sydney Opera House with STC
1993	Into the Woods	The Wolf / Cinderella's Prince	Sydney Opera House with STC
1994	Saint Joan	Dunois	West End / U.K. tour
1994; 1995; 1996	A Christmas Carol	Fred Anderson	Royal Shakespeare Company
1995	The Secret Garden	Dr. Neville Craven	Lyric Theatre, Brisbane, State Theatre, Sydney, State Theatre, Melbourne
1995	Les Misérables: The Dream Cast in Concert	Inspector Javert	Royal Albert Hall, 10th Anniversary concert
1995	Love's Labour's Lost	King of Navarre	Japan tour with Royal Shakespeare Company
1996	Macbeth	Banquo	Royal Shakespeare Company
1996	The White Devil	Lododvico	Swan Theatre
1996	Troilus and Cressida	Achilles	Royal Shakespeare Company
1996	Lift Off Live		Sydney Opera House with Australian Children's Television Foundation for Sydney Festival
1997	The Fix	Grahame Chandler	Donmar Warehouse, West End
1998	Hey, Mr. Producer!		Lyceum Theatre, London – Royal Gala Performance
2001	The Secret Garden	Lord Archibald Craven	Olivier Theatre, West End with RSC, West End
2002	South Pacific	Emile de Becque	Royal National Theatre, West End
2003	The Goat, or Who Is Sylvia?	Martin Gray	Fairfax Studio, Melbourne with MTC
2004	A Funny Thing Happened on the Way to the Forum	Miles Gloriosus	Royal National Theatre, West End
2005	The Cherry Orchard	Lopakhin	Wharf Theatre with STC & Australian tour
2005	Democracy	Willy Brandt	Sydney Theatre
2006	Evita	Juan Peron	Adelphi Theatre, West End
2007	Sweeney Todd: The Demon Barber of Fleet Street	Judge Turpin	Royal Festival Hall
2007–2008; 2009	La Cage aux Folles	Georges	Menier Chocolate Factory, Off West End, Playhouse Theatre, West End
2010	Hats Off!		National Theatre, Melbourne
2010; 2011	Mary Poppins	George Banks	Her Majesty's Theatre, Melbourne, Capitol Theatre, Sydney
2012	Yes, Prime Minister		Comedy Theatre, Melbourne, Canberra Theatre, Sydney Theatre, Gold Coast Arts Centre, Her Majesty's Theatre, Adelaide, His Majesty's Theatre, Perth, Playhouse, Brisbane with YPM International
2012	His Girl Friday	Walter Burns	Playhouse, Melbourne with MTC
2013	Waiting for Godot	Pozzo	STC
2014	Sweeney Todd: The Demon Barber of Fleet Street	Judge Turpin	Concert at Lincoln Center (New York debut)
2015	Sweeney Todd: The Demon Barber of Fleet Street	Judge Turpin	Concert at English National Opera
2014–2015	Ghosts	Pastor Manders	Southbank Theatre with MTC
2016; 2017–18	Follies	Benjamin Stone	Concert at Melbourne Recital Centre, Royal National Theatre, West End
2019	Philip Quast Uncut	Himself	Dunstan Playhouse, Adelaide
2021	Philip Quast: Is This All Then?	Himself	Seymour Centre, Sydney
2021	Death of a Salesman	Ben	Roslyn Packer Theatre with STC
2022	Moments in the Woods: Songs & Stories of Sondheim		The Famous Spiegeltent at Adelaide Cabaret Festival
2023	Do Not Go Gentle...	Robert Scott	Roslyn Packer Theatre with STC
2024	Cost of Living	Eddie	Bille Brown Theatre with Queensland Theatre, Wharf Theatre with STC
2026	Les Miserables	The Bishop of Digne	Radio City Music Hall / International Arena Concert Tour
