= Les Misérables: The Dream Cast in Concert =

Les Miśerables - The Dream Cast in Concert
- Directed by: Gavin Taylor; Paul Kafno
- Written by: Alain Boublil; Herbert Kretzmer; Claude-Michel Schönberg
- Produced by: Cameron Mackintosh
- Starring: Colm Wilkinson; Philip Quast; Michael Ball; Judy Kuhn; Lea Salonga; Ruthie Henshall; Michael Maguire; Alun Armstrong; Jenny Galloway; Anthony Crivello
- Edited by: Nigel Cattle
- Music by: Claude-Michel Schönberg
- Production companies: Cameron Mackintosh Limited; HD Thames
- Distributed by: Video Collection International
- Release date: 20 November 1995
- Running time: 148 minutes
- Country: United Kingdom
- Language: English

Les Misérables: The Dream Cast in Concert (1995), also titled Les Misérables in Concert, is a concert version of the 1980 musical Les Misérables, which was based on Victor Hugo's 1862 novel, produced to celebrate the 10th anniversary of the West End production. It was filmed in October 1995 at the Royal Albert Hall and was shortly afterwards released on VHS in the United Kingdom in November by Video Collection International. The concert was released on DVD, VHS and LD in North America by Columbia TriStar Home Video in 1998, and re-released on DVD in North America in 2008. The latest DVD presents the concert in its original 16x9 ratio.

Although filmed with HD cameras, a Blu-ray edition has not been released yet. The 10th Anniversary cast stars Colm Wilkinson as Jean Valjean, Philip Quast as Inspector Javert, Michael Ball as Marius Pontmercy, Lea Salonga as Éponine, Judy Kuhn as Cosette, Ruthie Henshall as Fantine, Michael Maguire as Enjolras, Anthony Crivello as Grantaire, Alun Armstrong as Thénardier, Jenny Galloway as Madame Thénardier, Adam Searles as Gavroche, Hannah Chick as Young Cosette, and several others, and was directed by John Caird. The performers were chosen from the London, Broadway and Australian productions of the show and the Royal Philharmonic Orchestra was conducted by David Charles Abell. It also aired on PBS as part of the Great Performances series.

== Production ==
The 10th anniversary concert of Les Misérables is known as the "Dream Cast in Concert" because Mackintosh hand-selected the cast. Colm Wilkinson reprised his role as Valjean after starring in the original West End and Broadway productions. Philip Quast was cast as Inspector Javert after the producers of the show witnessed his performance in a musical production in his home country of Australia. Wilkinson and Quast are widely recognized as the "Dream Casting" of the idolized roles of Valjean and Javert. Lea Salonga is the only non-white performer in the main cast. Her participation has been credited by many stage musical enthusiasts of breaking down racial barriers for future castings of the live show.

This presentation uses a "modernised" and more heavily orchestrated score than that of the original musical. It follows the traditional "musicals-in-concert" format with the cast lined up against a set of microphones with the orchestra and chorus behind them. The entire company wear costumes and use only necessary props (such as Javert's baton, Thénardier's notebook, etc.). Apart from minor movement on the concert stage, the performers do not participate in major action scenes. Where necessary, the video switches to action from the stage production.

A few action-based scenes from the musical are not included in the concert – such as the street brawl broken up by Javert, Gavroche's death, and the confrontation between Marius and Thénardier at the wedding feast. Some musical numbers, such as "At the End of the Day", "Lovely Ladies", "The Runaway Cart", "In My Life", and "Turning" were also shortened.

== Notable events ==
During the performance of "Castle on a Cloud", as Hannah Chick sang the line "Crying at all is not allowed", a loud pop was heard – the popping of a balloon, one of many stored in the ceiling for release at the end of the show. It visibly startled her (as seen by her sudden flinch), but she recovered immediately and continued the song with no delay in the delivery.

The five international, English-speaking Valjean's featured in the encore song, also played the convicts in the opening number "Look Down".

== Encore ==
The programme ends with an encore in which seventeen international actors who portray Jean Valjean in their respective countries join Wilkinson on stage to each sing a few bars of "Do You Hear the People Sing?" in their native languages. They are then joined by the entire cast and choir to sing the last verse of "One Day More", receiving a standing ovation. Red, white, and blue balloons, as well as confetti, fall from the ceiling; sparklers erupt on stage as the show finishes.

== Cast ==
=== Main performers ===
Actor	Role	Previous performance
Colm Wilkinson	Jean Valjean	Original London Cast; Original Broadway Cast
Philip Quast	Javert	Original Australian Cast; Complete Symphonic Recording
Ruthie Henshall	Fantine	Replacement London Cast
Michael Ball	Marius Pontmercy	Original London Cast; Complete Symphonic Recording
Judy Kuhn	Cosette	Original Broadway Cast
Lea Salonga	Éponine	Replacement Broadway Cast
Michael Maguire	Enjolras	Original Broadway Cast
Alun Armstrong	Monsieur Thénardier	Original London Cast
Jenny Galloway	Madame Thénardier	Replacement London Cast
Anthony Crivello	Grantaire	Original Broadway Cast
Adam Searles	Gavroche	Replacement London Cast
Hannah Chick	Young Cosette	new
Paul Monaghan	The Bishop of Digne	new
Jérôme Pradon	Courfeyrac	Replacement London Cast; 1991 Paris Cast
Peter Polycarpou	Jean Prouvaire	Original London Cast
Matthew Cammelle	Feuilly	Replacement London Cast
Darryl Knock	Joly	Replacement London Cast
David Bardsley	Combeferre	Replacement London Cast
Gareth Snook	Bamatabois	Replacement London Cast
Michael McCarthy	Factory Foreman	Replacement London Cast
Jackie Marks	Factory Girl	Original London Cast
Beverly Klein	Crone	Original London Cast

=== The seventeen Valjeans ===
The following are the seventeen Valjeans who participated in the second encore (in order):

Country	Actor
United Kingdom	Phil Cavill
France	Robert Marien
Germany	Jerzy Jeszke
Japan	Takeshi Kaga
Hungary	Gyula Vikidál
Sweden	Tommy Körberg
Poland	Krzysztof Stasierowski
Netherlands	Henk Poort
Canada	Michael Burgess
Austria	Reinhard Brussmann
Australia	Rob Guest
Norway	Øystein Wiik
Czech Republic	Jan Ježek
Denmark	Kurt Ravn
Ireland	Jeff Leyton
Iceland	Egill Ólafsson
United States	Craig Schulman

The five English speaking Valjeans (Cavill, Burgess, Guest, Leyton and Schulman) appear as the five principal convicts in "Look Down" at the beginning of Act 1.

== DVD release ==
The DVD was released by Columbia TriStar Home Video on 17 November 1998. This Region 1 fullscreen DVD is now out of print. It has a run time of 159 minutes.

A two-disc widescreen collector's edition was released by BBC Video in Region 1 territories on 19 February 2008. Viewers have reported that a segment of "Little People" is inexplicably removed. This release also does not contain the speeches. The second disc contains Les Misérables: Stage by Stage, a documentary from 1989.

Recent versions of the DVD include the missing segment of Little People.

A remastered special edition DVD of the concert was released on November 20, 2012.

== Soundtrack ==
Disc 1

1. Prologue (Look Down)
2. On Parole/The Bishop
3. Valjean's Soliloquy
4. At the End of the Day
5. I Dreamed a Dream
6. Lovely Ladies
7. Fantine's Arrest
8. The Runaway Cart
9. Who Am I? - The Trial
10. Fantine's Death
11. The Confrontation
12. Castle on a Cloud
13. Master of the House
14. The Bargain-Waltz of Treachery
15. Look Down
16. Stars
17. ABC Café/Red and Black
18. Do You Hear the People Sing?
19. Rue Plumet - In My Life
20. A Heart Full of Love

Disc 2

1. The Attack on Rue Plumet
2. One Day More!
3. Building the Barricade/On My Own
4. Back at the Barricade
5. Javert's Arrival/Little People
6. A Little Fall of Rain
7. Night of Anguish
8. First Attack
9. Drink with Me
10. Bring Him Home
11. Second Attack/The Final Battle
12. The Sewers
13. Dog Eats Dog
14. Javert's Suicide
15. Turning
16. Empty Chairs at Empty Tables
17. Every Day/A Heart Full of Love (Reprise)
18. The Wedding Chorale/Beggars at the Feast
19. Epilogue (Finale)
20. Encore 1: Entrance of International Valjeans
21. Encore 2: Do You Hear the People Sing?/One Day More!

== See also ==
- Les Misérables (musical)
- Les Misérables in Concert: The 25th Anniversary (2010)
- Les Misérables: The Staged Concert (2019)
- Adaptations of Les Misérables
