= La Révolution française =

La révolution française may refer to:

- La Révolution française (film), 1989
- La Révolution Française, a 1973 rock opera
- French Revolution, a period in French history
