= To Market to Market (film) =

To Market To Market
- Directed by: Virginia Rouse
- Written by: Virginia Rouse
- Produced by: Virginia Rouse
- Starring: Philip Quast; Maureen Edwards
- Cinematography: Jaems Grant
- Edited by: Tony Paterson
- Distributed by: Goosey Limited
- Release date: 1987
- Running time: 82 minutes
- Country: Australia
- Language: English
- Budget: A$600,000

To Market To Market is a 1987 Australian political film directed by Virginia Rouse, who was once an assistant to Paul Cox, and starring Philip Quast.

The film was made with funding from the Australian Film Commission and Film Victoria.

== Cast ==
- Philip Quast
- Maureen Edwards as Valerie
- Nina Landis as Samantha
