= Putting It Together: Direct from Broadway =

2001 film by Don Roy King

- DVD Cover Art
- Directed by: Don Roy King
- Based on: Putting It Together by Stephen Sondheim; Julia McKenzie
- Starring: Carol Burnett; George Hearn; John Barrowman; Bronson Pinchot; Ruthie Henshall
- Music by: Stephen Sondheim
- Distributed by: Broadway Worldwide
- Release date: October 14, 2001
- Running time: 105 minutes
- Country: United States
- Language: English

Putting It Together: Direct from Broadway is a 2001 film of the Broadway production of the musical revue Putting It Together as captured live in performance on Broadway featuring the show's original Broadway cast. The show was captured at Broadway's Ethel Barrymore Theatre in New York City February 20, 2000, utilizing multiple high-definition cameras by Broadway Worldwide.

The film was released October 14, 2001, on cable and satellite pay-per-view channels in the U.S., Canada, and Latin America. The program was released on DVD and VHS February 26, 2002, by Good Times Video, with a DVD re-release December 12, 2006, by Image Entertainment. HBO bought the program in December 2002 for a two-year contract on the network.

== Cast ==
- Carol Burnett as The Wife
- George Hearn as The Husband
- Ruthie Henshall as The Young Woman
- John Barrowman as The Young Man
- Bronson Pinchot as The Narrator

== Musical numbers ==
For a complete list of the songs performed and the shows in which they appeared, go to https://www.imdb.com/title/tt0260305/soundtrack?ref_=tt_trv_snd
