= Crime Story (British TV series) =

British true crime drama television series

- Genre: True crime
- Theme music composer: Dan Jones
- Country of origin: United Kingdom
- Original language: English
- No. of series: 2
- No. of episodes: 15

Production
- Executive producers: Robert Love; Christine Benson
- Producers: Bill Jones; Alan Macmillan; Jeff Pope
- Cinematography: Lawrence Jones; Alan Pyrah
- Running time: 60 minutes
- Production companies: Carlton Television (commissioned by); Blue Heaven Productions; Central Independent Television; Granada Television; HTV West; London Weekend Television; Scottish Television; Tyne Tees Television; Yorkshire Television

Original release
- Network: ITV
- Release: 18 September 1992 – 8 February 1995

Crime Story is a British true crime drama anthology television series, first broadcast on 18 September 1992 on ITV. Two series were produced between 1992 and 1995, containing a total of fifteen episodes. Each episode depicts the events leading up to and encompassing a notable true crime, including cases such as the Erwin Van Haarlem mystery and the Teacup Poisoner murders.

The series is notable for including the first television script written by BAFTA-award-winning writer Jeff Pope. Neither series has been released on DVD. In 2024, the show began airing on Talking Pictures TV.

== Episodes ==
Note: The 15 episodes are numbered differently on IMDb.com (below) vs. Britbox streaming channel

=== Series 1 (1992) ===
| No. overall | No. in series | Title | Directed by | Written by | Original release date |
|---|---|---|---|---|---|
| 1 | 1 | "All Good Friends" | Julian Jarrold | Frank Cottrell Boyce | 18 September 1992 |
The Case of the Handless Corpse: The murder of drug world figure Martin Johnstone, a crime spanning three continents and resulting in the conviction of five men. Cast: Peter O'Brien, Suzanne Packer, Philip Quast and Victor McGuire
| 2 | 2 | "Gone Too Far" | Simon Massey | Glenn Chandler | 25 September 1992 |
The Mystery of Mrs. Muriel McKay: A twisty tale involving kidnapping, the media and the police. Cast: Anne Reid, Jimmi Harkishin, Kulvinder Ghir, Ed Devereaux, Dicken Ashworth and Malcolm Tierney
| 3 | 3 | "Wallpaper Warrior" | Tony Kysh | Steve Chambers | 2 October 1992 |
Eddie Horner, a factory worker active in union politics, is radicalised to commit murder. Cast: Derek Walmsley, Jonathan Copestake, Tony Caunter and Jack Watling
| 4 | 4 | "Deadly Obsession" | Pennant Roberts | Rosemary Mason | 16 October 1992 |
The conviction of businesswoman Kathleen Calhaem, who was drawn to murder by unrequited love, jealousy, and blackmail. Cast: Janet Henfrey, David Hargreaves, Steven O'Donnell, Jeremy Nicholas and Victor Winding
| 5 | 5 | "The Britoil Affair" | Alan Macmillan | Stuart Hepburn | 6 November 1992 |
A cunning plan to defraud one of the world's largest oil companies of more than £20 million. Cast: Edita Brychta, Bill Murdoch, Vivienne Brown and Peter D'Souza
| 6 | 6 | "A Question of Identity" | Nigel Miller | Jeff Pope | 13 November 1992 |
The story of Erwin van Haarlem, a Dutch art dealer spying for Czechoslovakia with a mission to track down supporters of the dissident group, Chapter 77. Cast: Bernard Hill, Bob Mason, Shirley Cain, Tomek Bork, Simon Jessop and Sidney Kean
| 7 | 7 | "Dear Roy, Love Gillian" | Graham Theakston | Peter Brooks | 21 November 1992 |
A 16-year-old girl becomes a pen pal to an incarcerated convict, and her subsequent murder may or may not be linked to their on-paper romance. Cast: John McEnery, Julia Booth, Eamonn Clarke and Bernard Merrick

=== Series 2 (1993–1995) ===
| No. overall | No. in series | Title | Directed by | Written by | Original release date |
|---|---|---|---|---|---|
| 8 | 1 | "The Prince" | Unknown | Unknown | 22 September 1993 |
The Life and Crimes of Darius Guppy: A businessman stages a robbery at a jewellers in an attempt to reclaim the insurance money. Cast: James Purefoy, Jo Stone-Fewings, Christine Ashe, Peter Hilton and Stevan Rimkus
| 9 | 2 | "When the Lies Run Out" | Paul Greengrass | Paul Greengrass | 29 September 1993 |
The Ian Spiro Story: Following the murders of his wife and children, a CIA-Contracted intelligence operative is found dead in a suspected cyanide poisoning. Cast: Alfred Molina, Lesley Manville, Amir Morangy and Louise Hunt
| 10 | 3 | "Terrible Coldness" | Richard Signy | Unknown | 6 October 1993 |
Graham Young: The workplace murders committed by Graham Young, a young man previously convicted of death by poison. Cast: Mark Womack, Trevor Peacock, Arthur Cox, John Middleton and Chrissie Cotterill
| 11 | 4 | "The Yugoslav Hitman" | Alan Macmillan | Stuart Hepburn | 8 December 1993 |
Stedul: Nikola Stedul, a former Yugoslavian Freedom Fighter, tries to avoid a gun-man who is sent to the quiet Scottish town where he lives to assassinate him. Cast: Derek Lord, Simone Lahbib, John Stahl and Sandy West
| 12 | 5 | "The Stonehouse Affair" | Alan Macmillan | Don Shaw | 15 December 1993 |
Following a period of deceptive creative accounting, a British Labour MP tries to fake his own death. Cast: Tony Anholt, Estrid Barton, Peter O'Brien, Juliet Cadzow and Ahmed Khalil
| 13 | 6 | "The Whitehouse Farm Murders" | Mike Cocker | Unknown | 22 December 1993 |
When a married couple and three of their children are shot dead inside an isolated farmhouse one summer's night, their adopted son, Jeremy, becomes prime suspect. Cast: Neil Roberts, Diane Keen, Fiona Dolman, Jerome Willis, Jonathan Wrather and Davyd Harries
| 14 | 7 | "The Ladies' Man" | Simon Massey | Peter Whalley | 29 April 1994 |
Archibald Hall: The story of a Scottish serial killer committing crimes while working in service to members of the British aristocracy. Cast: John Shrapnel, Mark McGann and Freda Dowie
| 15 | 8 | "Hot Dog Wars" | Alan Bell | John Milne | 8 February 1995 |
A row between rival Hot Dog vendors over a backfired armed robbery results in a double murder. Cast: Stephen Marcus, Nicola Duffett, Paul Kynman and Danny Cerqueira
