= La Révolution Française =

1973 French rock opera

La Révolution Française is a French rock opera by Claude-Michel Schönberg and Raymond Jeannot, book by Alain Boublil and Jean-Max Rivière, created in 1973. The show premiered at the Palais des Sports de Paris.

== Synopsis ==
With the French Revolution as its background, we see the fictional story unfold of the impossible love between Charles Gauthier and Isabelle de Montmorency. Gauthier is the son of a shopkeeper who becomes a member of the Tiers-État, while Isabelle is an aristocrat who is forced to flee with the royal family.

== Creative team ==
- Book and Lyrics: Alain Boublil and Jean-Max Rivière
- Music: Claude-Michel Schönberg and Raymond Jeannot
- Arrangements: Jean-Claude Petit and Martin Circus

== Original cast ==
- Antoine : Général Bonaparte
- Cyril Azzam: General Kellermann
- Alain Bashung: Robespierre
- Jean Bentho: M. de La Fayette, Counsellor to the King
- Les Enfants de Bondy : The Children of the King (Louis and Marie-Thérèse)
- Françoise Boublil: Charlotte Corday
- Gérard Rinaldi: Talleyrand
- Les Charlots: Priests
- Noëlle Cordier : Isabelle de Montmorency
- Mario d'Alba: King's Counsellor/Newspaper Seller/Prison Guard
- Franca di Rienzo : Marie-Antoinette
- Raymond Jeannot: Newspaper Seller
- Gérard Layani : La Terreur (Soloist)
- Gérard Blanc: Danton
- Martin Circus: Members of the Tiers-État
- Jean-François Michael : Les Chouans (Soloist)
- Jean-Max Rivière: Marat
- Jean-Pierre Savelli: Charles Gauthier
- Claude-Michel Schönberg: Louis XVI
- Jean Schultheis: Antoine Fouquier-Tinville
- Élisabeth Vigna: Madame Sans-Gêne
- Système Crapoutchick: La Noblesse, La Terreur

== Discography ==
There are two versions of this work available: the original double album as well as the triple, expanded album of the presentation at the Theatre Mogador.

=== First version ===
The recording was released as a double-vinyl album from Vogue in 1973. This release contained a 16-page booklet, 12 pages of which featured cartoons incorporating the words of the songs. The disk has been re-edited several times since, in 1989, for example, to celebrate the bicentennial of the French Revolution.

==== Songlist ====
1. Ouverture - Choir
2. Les États généraux (5 mai 1789) :
  Le Roi - Louis XVI (The King)
  La Noblesse - Choir (The Nobility)
  Le Clergé - Choir (Clergy)
  Le Tiers-État - The Members of the Tiers-État
3. Charles Gauthier (mai 1789) - Charles Gauthier
4. À Versailles (14 juillet 1789) - The King's children and Louis XVI ("At Versaille", 14 July 1789)
5. Retour de la Bastille : Français, Français - Robespierre and Choir ("The Return of the Bastille; Frenchmen, Frenchmen")
6. Il s'appelle Charles Gauthier - Isabelle de Montmorency ("He is Called Charles Gauthier")
7. À bas tous les privilèges (nuit du 4 août 1789) - Choir ("Down With all Privileges", night of 4 August 1789)
8. Déclaration des droits de l'homme et du citoyen (26 août 1789) - Charles Gauthier ("Declaration of the Rights of Man and of the Citizen", 26 August 1789)
9. Ça ira, ça ira ! (5-6 octobre 1789) - Louis XVI, La Fayette, a counsellor and Choir ("It'll Be Fine, It'll Be Fine!", 5–6 October 1789)
10. Quatre saisons pour un amour - Isabelle de Montmorency ("Four Seasons for a Love")
11. Serment de Talleyrand (12 juillet 1789) / Fête de la Fédération (14 juillet 1790) - Talleyrand and Choir ("Oath of Talleyrand", 12 July 1789) / "Festival of the Federation", 14 July 1790)
12. Crieurs de journaux (21 juin 1791) / La patrie est en danger (11 juillet 1792) - Danton and Choir ("Newspaper Sellers", 21 June 1791 / "The Fatherland is in Danger", 11 July 1792)
13. L'Exil (10 août 1792) - Charles Gauthier and Isabelle de Montmorency ("Exile", 10 August 1792)
14. Valmy (20 septembre 1792) / Proclamation de la République (21 septembre 1792) - General Kellermann and Choir ("Valmy", 20 September 1792 / "Proclamation of the Republic", 21 September 1792)
15. C'est du beau linge, mon général - Madame Sans-Gêne, General Bonaparte and Choir ("They're Beautiful Clothes, My General")
16. Le Procès de Louis XVI : Réquisitoire (10 décembre 1792) - Fouquier-Tinville ("The Trial of Louis XVI: Indictment", 10 December 1792)
17. Louis XVI / Exécution (21 janvier 1793) - Louis XVI and Choir ("Louis XVI" / "Execution", 21 January 1793)
18. Chouans, en avant ! (juin 1793) - Les Chouans ("Chouans, Forward!", June 1793)
19. La terreur est en nous - Choir ("Terror is in Us")
20. L'Horrible Assassinat du citoyen Marat par la perfide Charlotte Corday (13 juillet 1793) - Marat and Charlotte Corday ("The Horrible Assassination of Citizen Marat by the Perfidious Charlotte Corday", 13 July 1793)
21. Fouquier-Tinville
22. Au petit matin (25 vendémiaire an II / 16 octobre 1793) - Marie-Antoinette ("Early Morning", 25 Vendémiaire Year II / 16 October 1793)
23. Que j'aie tort ou que j'aie raison (16 germinal an II / 5 avril 1794) - Robespierre and Choir ("Whether I'm Wrong or Right", 16 Germinal Year II / 5 April 1794)
24. La Fête de l'Être suprême (20 prairial an II / 8 juin 1794)- Robespierre and Choir ("The Festival of the Supreme Being", 20 Prairial Year II / 8 June 1794)
25. La Prison - The Prison Guard and Isabelle
26. Révolution (final) - Charles and Isabelle

The songs were distributed on the original double album as follows:

- 1-5 : Disc 1, side 1
- 6-10 : Disc 2, side 1 (2)
- 11-16 : Disc 2, side 2 (3)
- 17-25 : Disc 1, side 2 (4)

=== 1977 version ===
- The passage concerned with Charlotte Corday's assassination of Jean-Paul Marat was totally rewritten. While only a small intermezzo in the first version, it becomes an opera trio between Charlotte, Marat (who sings with a dagger in his heart) and his servant.
- One new scene was added : a confrontational dialogue between Charles Gauthier and Robespierre, each verse of which is a retort of the other character.

=== Recordings ===
- 1973 : Double album (LDM 30166 or LD 30166 / VG 308 430166 without booklet)
- 1977 : 3 disc box set (VG603 or C.V.U. 316)
- 1987 : First reissue on CD of 24 titres originaux (VG 651-600 146)
- 1989 : Special reissue for bicentennial of the French Revolution (PM 524 310 296 without booklet)
- 2000 : Reissue in standard and luxury editions (Anthology's B00004ZBMN)
