= Adam Searles =

British actor

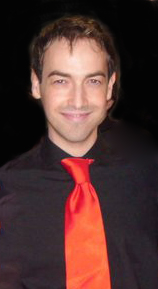
- Searles in 2010
- Born: 1 June 1981 (age 45); Lewisham, London
- Occupations: Actor, singer
- Years active: 1987–present
- Website: www.adamsearles.co.uk

Adam Searles (born 1 June 1981) is a British stage, film, and television actor. He has portrayed Gavroche in Les Misérables at the Palace Theatre, London, and played the original Artful Dodger in Cameron Mackintosh's 1994 production of Oliver! at the London Palladium. Searles opened the show in 1994 with Jonathan Pryce in the role of Fagin and was requested to close the show in 1998 with Jim Dale as Fagin.

Searles studied at the Sylvia Young Theatre School in London and appeared in the original performance of Andrew Lloyd Webber's musical Whistle Down The Wind at the Sydmonton Festival held at Lloyd Webber's country house, Sydmonton Court, in 1995. He also featured in the Cameron Mackintosh's Gala Concert. Hey Mr Producer and was part of the dream cast for Cameron Mackintosh's 10th Anniversary Concert of Les Misérables.

He has since gone on to television work and in 2007 he appeared in Pantomime with Henry Winkler.

In 2011, Searles graduated from the Royal Academy of Music's Musical Theatre course. He was also one of the 2010 recipients of the BBC Musical Theatre Bursary Award.

Searles appeared in the film version of Les Misérables, released in 2012.

== Recognition ==
Of Searles' opening night performance as the Artful Dodger in Cameron Mackintosh's 1994 production of Oliver!, the Toronto Star wrote "Adam Searles lit up the stage with his cocky, swaggering performance as Fagin's chief sidekick", while Matt Wolf of Variety wrote "Artful Dodger for opening night, Adam Searles, had Cockney panache and charm to spare," and the Guinness Encyclopedia of Popular Music wrote that Searle's performance "almost stole the show."

== Discography ==
- Hey Mr Producer
- Oliver: 1994 Original London Cast Recording
- Les Miserables: 10th Anniversary Concert

== Filmography ==
- London's Burning (TV)
- Dodgem (3 episodes, 1991) (TV)
- B&B (1992)
- Great Performances (1 episode, 1995) (TV)
- Noel's House Party (1 episode, 1997) (TV)
- Hey Mr Producer (1998) (TV)
- Sex 'n' Death (1999) (TV)
- Topsy-Turvy (1999) (Film)
- Casualty (1 episode, 2001) (TV)
- Teachers (1 episode, 2001) (TV)
- The Bill (2 episodes, 2000–2001) (TV)
- Goodbye, Mr Steadman (2001) (TV)
- Les Misérables (2012) (Film)
