= Marguerite (musical) =

- Music: Michel Legrand
- Lyrics: Alain Boublil; Herbert Kretzmer
- Book: Alain Boublil; Claude-Michel Schönberg; Jonathan Kent
- Basis: La Dame aux Camélias by Alexandre Dumas, fils
- Productions: 2008 West End; 2009 Japan; 2010 Czech Republic; 2012 London Revival

Marguerite is a musical with a book by Alain Boublil, Claude-Michel Schönberg and Jonathan Kent, lyrics by Alain Boublil and Herbert Kretzmer, and music by Michel Legrand, with original French lyrics by Boublil. Based on the romantic novel La Dame aux Camélias by Alexandre Dumas, fils, the musical updates the story to 1940s German-occupied Paris. It tells the tale of a 40-year-old ex-singer and her affair with a young musician who is mixed up with the French Resistance, whilst she is the mistress of a Nazi officer.

== Productions ==
It began previews at the Theatre Royal Haymarket in London on 7 May 2008 and had its press night on 20 May 2008. Co-authors and producers Alain Boublil and Claude-Michel Schönberg announced an early closing date of 13 September 2008 (it had been scheduled to run through 1 November 2008).

A new production of Marguerite opened on 2 December 2010 in Ostrava, Czech Republic. This production was entirely different from the original staging in London, completely rewritten book and lyrics by Alain Boublil and his wife Marie Zamora. New musical numbers were written by Michel Legrand and completely new orchestration added by William David Brohn. This new version was produced by the National Moravian-Silesian Theatre in Czech, with lyrics by Michael Prostejovsky. The Czech creative team was led by director Gabriela Haukvicová. The main actress Hana Fialová in the leading role was nominated for the Thalie Award in the category "operetta, musical and other musical-dramatic genres" for outstanding female stage performance.

The original version of the show had one of its first 'Out of London' stagings at The Mill Studio in Guildford from 12 to 15 January 2011, by PH Productions, featuring Becky Van-Orden as Marguerite and Oliver Trumble as Armand, supported by a cast of 16.

The first London revival of Marguerite was staged by Alex Parker Productions from 3-28 October 2012 at the Tabard Theatre, having undergone extensive reworking. Whilst the concept hadn't changed significantly, the featured songs were a hybrid of the Theatre Royal Haymarket production and the Ostrava, Czech Republic production. It featured a totally new book with revised plot by Alain Boublil and Director Guy Unsworth. The score received a rigorous re-working by Jude Obermüller, featuring a new 7-piece orchestration and additional lyrics by Callum McIntyre.

== Synopsis ==
=== Prologue ===
August 25, 1944. The citizens of Paris sing about Marguerite, who was once a well-known lady of Parisian society ("Come One Come All") but who is now the lover of a German officer.

=== Act I ===
March 3, 1942. It is Marguerite's 40th birthday and she is celebrating with her friends, who are living in blissful ignorance of the war ("Let the World Turn"). As dinner is served, Marguerite's former talent agent, Georges, brings a band in. The band consists of Armand, his sister Annette, her boyfriend Lucien and their friend Pierrot. Annette, Lucien and Pierrot are members of the resistance. Armand recalls seeing Marguerite sing years before, and being captivated. Marguerite is delighted to learn that they are a swing band and encourages everyone to leave the table and dance while Annette sings "Jazz Time". Marguerite becomes flirtatious with all of the men, which enrages her lover, Otto. Armand attempts to calm the situation by playing "China Doll," Marguerite's biggest hit, and Marguerite is persuaded to sing.

An air raid siren sounds and a distant explosion shakes the room. Everyone runs off to the shelter except for Marguerite. Armand is the last to leave and the two are left alone. Armand tells Marguerite that he knows that she only pretends to be happy, and Marguerite confesses that she does not love Otto. As they move towards each other, a bomb shatters the French windows and the electricity goes out. Marguerite and Armand share a passionate kiss as the all-clear siren sounds ("China Doll (Reprise)"). The guests return, shaken but unharmed. Armand leaves, and Marguerite promises to meet him the next day.

In her bedroom, Marguerite reflects on her feelings for Armand ("The Face I See"). Otto enters and tries to confess his love for her, but she changes the subject. Otto becomes enraged and reminds her that even if she doesn't love him, she is still his mistress.

The next day, the band members reflect on the changing state of Paris, while Armand sings of his new passion for Marguerite ("Time Was When"). A Nazi band is playing at the same bandstand and the crowd joins in ("The World Begins Today"). Armand waits for Marguerite ("Waiting") but when she does arrive it is only to tell him that their relationship can never be.

Lucien and Annette are at home listening to coded radio messages when they hear that the French government will force Jews to wear an identifying mark. This worries Lucien as he is Jewish. Annette says she will speak to her resistance contact about leaving Paris. Pierrot arrives, carrying various food items that he had stolen from the party. When Pierrot leaves, he is stopped by the police. They discover the stolen food in his bag and send him away to a concentration camp.

Armand sings of his love for Marguerite ("Intoxication"). The song becomes a trio between Armand, Marguerite and Otto.

At the concentration camp, Pierrot is tortured ("Day by Day (Part One)"). He manages to buy his way out of trouble by giving the Nazis the name and address of a Jew – Lucien.

Annette goes to see Armand. She has train tickets and wants him to leave Paris with her. Lucien bursts in and explains the situation - he must leave Paris at once. While Armand packs his bags, Marguerite comes to his flat and they make love ("I Am Here").

That night, Annette and Lucien wait for Armand at the train station. Lucien leaves, but Annette stays behind, promising to join him later ("Take Good Care of Yourself").

=== Act II ===
Marguerite and Armand meet in a park, as the crowd sing of change ("Day by Day (Part Two)"). Otto calls upon Hermann, a fellow Nazi officer, to have Marguerite followed. Marguerite goes to see Armand ("Dreams Shining Dreams"). She tells him that she must leave early because Otto has invited guests. He becomes angry and throws her love letters all over his flat. They reconcile and plan to leave Paris. Marguerite leaves to go home to grab her belongings.

Annette meets her resistance contact, Saurel, who gives her a briefcase full of documents and tells her to smuggle them out of Paris. He warns her that Armand is having an affair with a Nazi officer's lover, making him a danger to her and himself. This worries Annette ("Take Good Care of Yourself (Reprise)"). Annette goes to Armand's flat, arriving at the same time as Hermann, who captures her after finding incriminating documents in her bag.

Otto is sitting in a darkened room with Marguerite's love letters, singing about his feelings ("I Hate the Very Thought of Women"). When Marguerite arrives home, he confronts her with the letters. Hermann brings in Annette, who is covered in cuts and bruises. Otto promises to stop torturing Annette if Marguerite writes a letter to Armand saying that she will never see him again. Marguerite complies, hoping that Armand will understand ("The Letter"). Armand reads the letter and is distraught ("What’s Left of Love"). Pierrot arrives with an undercover Lucien. Lucien, furious at Armand for putting Annette in danger, enlists him to take a new job that Saurel has arranged from an unknown contact: the assassination of Otto.

There is a big New Year's Eve masquerade party and the chanteuse sings ("Paris"). Marguerite accompanies Otto, against her will. Armand, Lucien and Pierrot attend, disguising themselves as the band. As the fireworks ring in the new year, Armand shoots Otto dead. The crowd sing of change again ("Day by Day (Part Three)").

Without Otto to support her, Marguerite visits Georges and asks him to help her find work as a singer, but he refuses. He confesses that he had only pretended to be her friend so that he could mingle with the upper class. Distraught, Marguerite leaves ("How Did I Get to Where I Am?").

Paris is liberated ("Day by Day (Part Four)"), and the French turn on the Nazi sympathizers. Armand, Lucien and Pierrot watch as the crowds celebrate their newly liberated city. The boys tell Armand that Annette has been freed and is recovering. They reveal to him that Marguerite made a bargain with Otto in order to save Annette and Armand's lives...and that she was the one who tipped the Resistance off that Otto would be at the New Year's Eve party. Realizing the letter she sent was a means to save him and understanding the danger she is in at the hands of the French people, he runs to find her.

The collaborators attack Marguerite in her home, humiliating the woman who slept with the enemy: "(Come One Come All (Reprise)"). Armand, Annette, Lucien and Pierrot rush in and break up the mob. Armand sends Pierrot to find a doctor. He tells her that Lucien explained the circumstances under which Marguerite wrote that the letter, and forgives her. They profess their love for each other, but it is too late, and Marguerite dies in Armand's arms ("Finale"). He picks her up and carries her off.

== Original London principal cast ==
- Marguerite — Ruthie Henshall
- Armand — Julian Ovenden
- Otto — Alexander Hanson
- Lucien — Simon Thomas
- Annette — Annalene Beechey
- Pierrot — Matt Cross
- Georges — Andrew C Wadsworth
- Chanteuse — Gay Soper
- Hermann — Keiron Crook

== Song list ==
Act I

- "Come One Come All" – Ensemble
- "Let the World Turn" – Marguerite, Georges and Ensemble
- "Jazz Time" – Annette, Armand, Lucien, Pierrot and Ensemble
- "China Doll" – Marguerite
- "China Doll" (Reprise) – Armand and Marguerite
- "The Face I See" – Marguerite
- "Time Was When" – Lucien, Annette, Pierrot and Armand
- "The World Begins Today" – Ensemble
- "Waiting" – Armand and Marguerite
- "Intoxication" – Armand, Marguerite and Otto
- "Day by Day (Part One)" – Ensemble
- "I Am Here" – Marguerite and Armand
- "Take Good Care of Yourself" – Annette and Lucien

Act II

- "Day by Day (Part Two)" – Marguerite, Armand, Otto and Ensemble
- "Dreams Shining Dreams" – Marguerite and Armand
- "Take Good Care of Yourself" (Reprise) – Annette
- "I Hate the Very Thought of Women" – Otto
- "The Letter" – Marguerite and Otto
- "What's Left of Love" – Armand
- "Paris" – Chanteuse, Marguerite, Otto, Armand, Pierrot and Lucien
- "Day by Day (Part Three)" – Ensemble
- "How Did I Get to Where I Am?" – Marguerite
- "Day by Day (Part Four)" – Ensemble
- "Come One Come All (Reprise)" – Ensemble
- "Finale" – Marguerite and Armand

== Awards and nominations ==
=== Original London production ===
Year	Award	Category	Nominee	Result
2009	Laurence Olivier Award	Best Actress in a Musical	Ruthie Henshall	Nominated
2009	Laurence Olivier Award	Best Performance in a Supporting Role in a Musical	Alexander Hanson	Nominated
2009	Laurence Olivier Award	Best Set Design	Paul Brown	Nominated

== Footage ==
- Footage of the Press Launch Day of the Original London production. Musical extracts and interviews with the cast and talent plus the only interview with Michel Legrand. Filmed by Sean James Cameron with Interviews by Glenn Rice
