= Putting It Together =

- 1999 Broadway production windowcard
- Music: Stephen Sondheim
- Lyrics: Stephen Sondheim
- Book: Stephen Sondheim; Julia McKenzie
- Productions: 1992 Oxford; 1993 Off-Broadway; 1998 Los Angeles; 1999 Broadway; 2015 Ireland

Putting it Together is a musical revue showcasing the songs of Stephen Sondheim. Drawing its title from a song in Sunday in the Park with George, it was devised by Sondheim and Julia McKenzie. The revue has received several productions, beginning with its premiere in England in 1992, Off-Broadway in 1993, Broadway in 1999 and the West End in 2014.

== Production history ==
=== Original UK production (1992) ===
The revue came about due to many requests for an update to Side by Side by Sondheim (1976). Having resisted a new show, he was finally convinced by producer Cameron Mackintosh, and Julia McKenzie was brought in to assist.

Putting It Together was first performed on January 27, 1992 at the Old Fire Station Theatre in Oxford, England, where it ran for 24 performances. Directed by Julia McKenzie and produced by Cameron Mackintosh, the cast included Diana Rigg, Clive Carter, Claire Moore, Clarke Peters, and Kit Hesketh-Harvey.

=== Original US production (1993) ===
The Manhattan Theatre Club production opened Off-Broadway on April 1, 1993 at New York City Center, where it ran for 59 performances and 37 previews. It was directed by McKenzie and choreographed by Bob Avian, with scenery by Robin Wagner, costumes by Theoni V. Aldredge, and lighting by Tharon Musser. The cast included Stephen Collins, Christopher Durang, Michael Rupert, Rachel York, and Julie Andrews, making her return to the New York City stage after an absence of more than 30 years.

The markedly revised revue now had a slight plot: At an all-night, black-tie party in a penthouse. The hosts, an older couple (Andrews and Collins) face their disillusions and marital troubles; a younger, less jaundiced couple (Rupert and York) struggle with their feelings and desires, and a commentator (Durang) oversees and influences the action. The spouses deal with infidelity and divorce but finally reconcile before dawn. A cast recording was released by RCA Records.

=== Broadway production (1999) ===
A production at the Mark Taper Forum (Los Angeles) transferred to Broadway the following year, opening November 21, 1999 at the Ethel Barrymore Theatre, where it ran for 101 performances and 22 previews. Directed by Eric D. Schaeffer and choreographed by Bob Avian, the Broadway cast included Carol Burnett (Wife), George Hearn (Husband), Ruthie Henshall (Young Woman), John Barrowman (Young Man), and Bronson Pinchot (Observer). Kathie Lee Gifford replaced Burnett at some performances. The production marked the return of Burnett to the Broadway stage after performing in Moon Over Buffalo in 1995. Hearn was nominated for the Tony Award for Best Actor in a Musical.

A video recording of the Broadway production (directed by Don Roy King) was released for television and home media as Putting It Together: Direct from Broadway. The DVD release includes blooper footage of Burnett's skirt falling down during the opening of the second act.

=== West End production (2014) ===
The revue received its West End premiere in January 2014 at St. James Theatre, London with a cast that included Janie Dee, David Bedella, Damian Humbley, Caroline Sheen, and Daniel Crossley. It was directed by Alastair Knights, with choreography by Matthew Rowland and Musical Supervision by Alex Parker. It ran for a strictly limited 3-week run, closing on the 1st February 2014.

=== Original Northern Ireland production (2015) ===
The revue received its Northern Irish premiere in December 2015 at Lyric Theatre, Belfast with Fra Fee, Carol Starks, Nicholas Pound, Christina Tedders, and Brad Clapson, directed by Stephen Whitson, and musical supervision by Alex Parker.

=== Sydney production (2026) ===
The revue will receive its Australian premiere in January 2026 at the Foundry Theatre in Pyrmont, with performers including Caroline O'Connor, Michael Cormick, Nigel Huckle, Bert LaBonté and Stefanie Caccamo.

== Songs ==
=== Original production ===
Act I

- Invocation and Instructions (The Frogs)
- Putting It Together (Sunday in the Park with George)
- Rich and Happy (Merrily We Roll Along)
- Merrily We Roll Along (Merrily We Roll Along)
- Lovely (A Funny Thing Happened on the Way to the Forum)
- Everybody Ought to Have a Maid (A Funny Thing Happened on the Way to the Forum)
- Sequence:
  - "Sooner or Later" (Dick Tracy)
  - I'm Calm (A Funny Thing Happened on the Way to the Forum)
  - Impossible (A Funny Thing Happened on the Way to the Forum)
  - Ah, But Underneath ...! (Follies - London)
- Hello Little Girl (Into the Woods)
- My Husband the Pig/ Every Day a Little Death (A Little Night Music)
- Have I Got a Girl for You (Company)
- Pretty Women (Sweeney Todd)
- Now (A Little Night Music)
- Bang! (A Little Night Music)
- Country House (Follies - London)
- "Could I Leave You?" (Follies)

Act II

- Entr'acte/ Back in Business (Dick Tracy)
- Rich and Happy (Merrily We Roll Along)
- Night Waltzes (A Little Night Music-stage and film)
- Gun Song (Assassins)
- The Miller's Son (A Little Night Music)
- Live Alone and Like It (Dick Tracy)
- Sorry-Grateful (Company)
- Sweet Polly Plunkett (Sweeney Todd)
- I Could Drive a Person Crazy (Company)
- Marry Me a Little (Company)
- "Getting Married Today" (Company)
- "Being Alive" (Company)
- Like It Was (Merrily We Roll Along)
- Old Friends (Merrily We Roll Along)

=== Broadway production (1999) ===
Act I

- Invocation and Instructions to the Audience (from The Frogs) — The Observer
- Putting It Together (from Sunday in the Park with George) —The Company
- Rich and Happy (from Merrily We Roll Along) — The Company
- Do I Hear a Waltz? (from an abandoned project prior to collaboration with Richard Rodgers) — The Wife, The Husband
- Merrily We Roll Along #1 (from Merrily We Roll Along) — The Observer
- Lovely (from A Funny Thing Happened on the Way to the Forum) — The Younger Woman, The Wife
- Hello Little Girl (from Into the Woods) — The Husband, The Younger Woman
- My Husband the Pig (from A Little Night Music) — The Wife
- Everyday a Little Death (from A Little Night Music) — The Wife, The Younger Woman
- Everybody Ought to Have a Maid (from A Funny Thing Happened On The Way to the Forum) — The Wife, The Observer
- Have I Got a Girl for You (from Company) — The Younger Man, The Husband
- Pretty Women (from Sweeney Todd) — The Younger Man, The Husband
- "Sooner or Later" (from Dick Tracy) — The Younger Woman
- Bang! (from A Little Night Music) — The Younger Man, The Observer, The Younger Woman
- Country House (from Follies) — The Wife, The Husband
- Unworthy of Your Love (from Assassins) — The Younger Man, The Younger Woman
- Merrily We Roll Along #2 (from Merrily We Roll Along) — The Observer
- "Could I Leave You?" (from Follies) — The Wife
- Rich and Happy (Reprise) — The Company

Act II

- Back in Business (from Dick Tracy) — The Company
- It's Hot Up Here (from Sunday in the Park with George) — The Company
- "The Ladies Who Lunch" (from Company) — The Wife
- The Road You Didn't Take (from Follies) — The Husband
- Live Alone and Like It (from Dick Tracy) — The Younger Man
- More (from Dick Tracy) — The Younger Woman
- There's Always a Woman (from Anyone Can Whistle) — The Wife, The Younger Woman
- Buddy's Blues (from Follies) — The Observer
- Good Thing Going (from Merrily We Roll Along) — The Husband
- Marry Me a Little ( from Company) — The Younger Man
- Not Getting Married Today (from Company) — The Wife
- Merrily We Roll Along #3 (from Merrily We Roll Along) — The Company
- "Being Alive" (from Company) — The Company
- Like It Was (from Merrily We Roll Along) — The Wife
- Old Friends (from Merrily We Roll Along) — The Company

== Awards and nominations ==
=== Original Broadway production ===
| Year | Award ceremony | Category | Nominee | Result |
|---|---|---|---|---|
| 2000 | Tony Award | Best Performance by a Leading Actor in a Musical | George Hearn | Nominated |
| 2000 | Drama Desk Award | Outstanding Revival of a Musical | | Nominated |

== See also ==
- Side by Side by Sondheim
- Sondheim on Sondheim
