= Michael Maguire (actor) =

American actor (born 1955)

- Born: Michael L. Maguire; February 20, 1955 (age 71); Newport News, Virginia, U.S.
- Education: University of Michigan; Southwestern Law School
- Occupations: Actor, singer
- Years active: 1987–2000
- Spouse(s): Marita Geraghty (m. 1991; div. 2001); 2 daughters Shelley Smith (m. 2005; died 2023)
- Children: 2

Michael L. Maguire (born February 20, 1955) is an American lawyer and former actor and singer, best known for his role as Enjolras in the original Broadway production of the musical Les Misérables. This role won him a Tony Award in 1987. It also won him a Drama Desk Award and a Theatre World Award. In 1995, he was chosen to reprise the role in Les Misérables: The Dream Cast in Concert at the Royal Albert Hall in London, produced to celebrate the musical's 10th anniversary. His voice type is baritone.

== Biography ==
Maguire was born on February 20, 1955, in Newport News, Virginia, and as a teenager, worked as a strolling troubadour in Williamsburg, Virginia, before going on to study opera at the Oberlin Conservatory and the University of Michigan. He worked as a stockbroker for several years before making his Broadway debut in 1987 with Les Misérables. He appeared in the films L.A. Pictures, Cadillac, Go Fish, The Deep End of the Ocean, Busted, and Where The Day Takes You, as well as in a variety of television shows.

Before making his Broadway debut, he starred in Kismet in 1986 as the Caliph at the Royal Alexandra Theatre. In 1990, he performed at the New York City Opera in their production of A Little Night Music as Count Carl-Magnus Malcolm. The next year he appeared as Gaylord Ravenal in Show Boat at the Raymond Theatre. In 1998 and 1999, he reprised his role of Enjolras in the United States tour of Les Misérables. In 2001, he was featured in Freud Playhouse’s production of Strike up the Band as Jim Townsend.

In 2008, he received a Juris Doctor degree from Southwestern Law School in Los Angeles. He now practices family law in Beverly Hills and is founder of a specialized consulting company, Marital Dispute Advisors, Inc.
