= Peggy Sue Got Married (musical) =

Musical

- Promotional poster
- Music: Bob Gaudio
- Lyrics: Jerry Leichtling
- Book: Arlene Sarner; Jerry Leichtling
- Basis: Peggy Sue Got Married
- Productions: 2001 West End

Peggy Sue Got Married is a 2001 musical adapted from the 1986 film directed by Francis Ford Coppola. The musical shares the same storyline as the movie, following a 42-year-old woman as she travels back in time to relive certain high school experiences.

The book was written by Arlene Sarner and Jerry Leichtling, with music composed by Bob Gaudio, and lyrics by Jerry Leichtling. The musical opened in the West End theatres of London in August 2001, with Ruthie Henshall starring as Peggy Sue; other actors included Tim Howar, Gavin Lee, and Andrew Kennedy. Ruthie Henshall received an Olivier Award nomination for Best Actress in a Musical in the role of Peggy Sue. The production runs for two hours and thirty minutes, with one intermission.

== Storyline ==
Peggy Sue is reevaluating her life at 42 years old due to an awaiting divorce with her cheating husband, who she has been with since he got her pregnant in high school. Upon going to a 25 year high school reunion, she travels back in time to 1960, when she was 17. Even though she is back in her 17-year-old body, she still has her 42-year-old mind, memories, and maturity. She takes this opportunity to relive her youth and do all the things she regrets not doing. She parties, tells her parents that she loves them, and talks to the school geek about his future success in life. Ultimately, she must choose to either go down the same path, or pursue her high school heart throb, Michael.

== Production ==
The musical opened in the West End at the Shaftesbury Theatre on August 20, 2001, and closed on October 13, 2001. The mostly positive reviews praised Henshall's performance. Its early closing has been attributed to the reduced numbers of people visiting London after the events of 9/11; during the time, many theatrical shows in West End also performed poorly.

== Cast and characters ==
=== Main characters ===
| Character | Role | Actor/Actress |
|---|---|---|
| Peggy Sue | Main Character | Ruthie Henshall |
| Charlie | Peggy Sue's Husband | Andrew Kennedy |
| Michael | High School Heartthrob | Tim Howar |
| Richard | High School Nerd | Gavin Lee |
| Evelyn | | Sara Weymouth |
| Doug | | Gerard Bentall |
| Delores | | Melanie Marcus |

=== Other characters ===
Miss Grano, Danny, Arthur, Mr. Kalodney, Walter, Joe, Linda, Maddy, Carol, School Nurse, and Jack.

=== Other cast ===
Gerard Bentall, Verity Bentham, Dawn Buckland, Chris Crompton, Samuel James, Melanie Marcus, Dean Maynard, Melitsa Nicola, Stuart Nurse, Paul Peacock, Richard Peakman, Wayne Perrey, Andrew Playfoot, Neil Reynolds, Tanya Robb, Vicki Simon, Donna Steele, Scarlett Strallen, Sam Strasfeld, Lucy Moorby, Pippa Gebette, Shirley Hafey, Terence Hillyer, Ian Waller, Francesca Newitt.

Design: Ruari Murchison

Lighting Design: Mark Jonathan

Sound: Rick Clarke

Musical Arrangements: Gary Hind

Casting Director: Anne Vosser

Choreographer: Sergio Trujillo

== Songs ==
Act one

- "You Still Sing to Me"
- "Yesterday Tonight"
- "Crown of Love"
- "One of the Guys"
- "When You Get a Girl Alone"
- "This Time Around"
- "New Car Smell"
- "Like An Angel"
- "It's Gotta Be Now"
- "The Truth of Youth"
- "Raw Youth"
- "I Can't See Myself Without You"
- "Two Kinds of Fire"

Act two

- "Bad Girls Do (What Good Girls Won't)"
- "I've Done Nothing But Love You"
- "When You Get a Girl Alone (reprise)"
- "Bongo Beat"
- "Did Ya Do It"
- "You're Carrying My Dreams"
- "Nights Like This"
- Finale: "Crown of Love" - "All That Love Can Do" - "I Can't See Myself Without You"
