= Jean-Max Rivière =

French singer-songwriter (1937–2025)

Jean-Max Rivière (19 October 1937 – 15 November 2025) was a French singer-songwriter. He died on 15 November 2025, at the age of 88.
