= Javier Arroyuelo =

Argentine writer (born 1949)

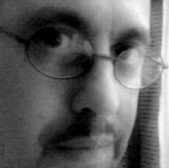
Javier Arroyuelo

Javier Arroyuelo is a French-Argentine author and journalist.

Born in Avellaneda, Buenos Aires, in 1949. he has lived in Paris (1969-2006) then in Buenos Aires since 2006.

== Career ==
=== Journalism ===
His first contribution to Vogue Paris in collaboration with Rafael López Sánchez was a piece for Marlene Dietrich's special 1975 Christmas issue. As a regular contributor of Vogue Paris he wrote about the cultural scene in Paris and New York, the theatre and the arts, and worked with photographers such as Horst, Hurrell and Helmut Newton. His column, Oh, les beaux mondes, ran in the magazine until 1980.

In the 1980s, his monthly column Out in Paris, also in collaboration with López Sánchez, ran in Andy Warhol's Interview Magazine.

His work, mainly long pieces on fashion, style, decoration, the arts- has also appeared in Vanity Fair, and the American editions of Vogue, and House and Garden, as well as in Italy's Vanity Fair.

From 1988 to 2016 he was a regular contributor of Vogue Italia and L'Uomo Vogue. His journalistic work focuses on the analysis and commentary of social trends and popular culture, fashion and consumerism. In 2002 he published Roberto Cavalli and contributed to kARTell. Since 2014 he writes a column for La Nación Revista, the Sunday magazine of La Nación, one of Argentina's leading newspapers.

=== Other work ===
His texts for the theater include Goddess and, with Rafael López Sánchez, L'Histoire du Théâtre, Comédie Policière, and Futura, some of which they also directed -L'Interprétation, and Succès. In the 1980s and '90s he worked for the Paloma Picasso brand, most particularly the fragrance, cosmetics and accessories lines. In 1968, associated with Rafael López Sánchez, Pedro Pujó and Jorge Alvarez, he created Mandioca, la madre de los chicos, an artistic venture centered on rock and roll recordings and shows.
