= Alain Boublil =

French musical theatre lyricist and librettist (born 1941)

Alain Boublil (born 5 March 1941) is a French national musical theatre lyricist and librettist, best known for his collaborations with the composer Claude-Michel Schönberg for musicals on Broadway and London's West End. These include La Révolution Française (1973), Les Misérables (1980), Miss Saigon (1989), Martin Guerre (1996), The Pirate Queen (2006), and Marguerite (2008).

== Life and career ==
Boublil was born in Tunisia, to a Sephardic Jewish family. Boublil's first musical, La Révolution Française, was the first-ever staged French rock opera. It was conceived by Boublil in 1973 after he watched the premiere of Jesus Christ Superstar in New York. The composer was Claude-Michel Schönberg, with whom Boublil has since collaborated on a number of successful projects, including Les Misérables and Miss Saigon. Les Misérables first opened in Paris in 1980.

On 8 October 1985, an English-language production of Les Misérables produced by Cameron Mackintosh and directed by Trevor Nunn and John Caird premiered in London at The Royal Shakespeare Company's Barbican Theatre. The show transferred to the West End's Palace Theatre on 4 December 1985. It is the longest-running musical in West End history.

=== Les Misérables ===
Productions based on the Nunn/Mackintosh staging of Les Misérables have been staged all over the world, including a second French production which opened in Paris in 1991. Worldwide, Les Misérables has been seen by over 50 million people, with a total box office gross of over $1.8 billion.

=== Miss Saigon ===
Miss Saigon opened in London on 20 September 1989 where it played for 10 consecutive successful years at the Drury Lane Theatre. It spawned two US touring companies, a Toronto production and has been seen by more than 13.2 million people in North America for a gross of $612 million.

=== Other works ===
With Javier Arroyuelo and Rafael Lopez Sanchez, Boublil worked on the French translation of The Rocky Horror Show for its French premiere in 1975.

Alain and Daniel Boublil created Abbacadabra, a French children's musical based on songs from the pop group ABBA, for French television in 1983.

Martin Guerre reached the West End in 1996 and won the 1997 Olivier Award for Best Musical. Productions on tour in the UK, the US, and Europe followed, but the show failed to repeat the success of its two predecessors.

Boublil also wrote the play Le Journal d'Adam et Eve, based on two short stories by Mark Twain. It premiered in Paris in 1994 at Le Petit Montparnasse.

He has worked on the stage adaptation of Jacques Demy's Les Demoiselles de Rochefort, together with composer Michel Legrand, that opened at Le Palais des Congrès in 2003.

Boublil and Schönberg's The Pirate Queen—a musical about the 16th century Irish pirate, chieftain, and adventuress Grace O'Malley—debuted at Chicago's Cadillac Palace Theatre in fall 2006. It then moved to Broadway, where it closed in 2007. The musical starred Stephanie J. Block as Grace and Hadley Fraser as Tiernan.

The musical Marguerite is by Alain Boublil and Claude-Michel Schönberg, and includes music by Michel Legrand and lyrics by Herbert Kretzmer. Set during World War II in occupied Paris and inspired by the romantic novel The Lady of the Camellias (by Alexandre Dumas, fils), Marguerite is about the mistress of a high-ranking German officer who attracts the love of a pianist half her age. The musical premiered on 6 May 2008 at the Royal Haymarket Theatre in London. Marguerite received its London revival at the Tabard Theatre, Chiswick in October 2012. Staged by Alex Parker Productions, the revised show had a new book by Boublil and Guy Unsworth, and a reworked score (adaptation, orchestration and arrangement) by Jude Obermüller.

He was nominated for Best Original Song at the 70th Golden Globe Awards for the song "Suddenly" from the 2012 film version of Les Misérables.
