= Hey, Mr. Producer! =

1998 Concert

Hey, Mr Producer!
- Hey, Mr Producer! album cover

Hey, Mr. Producer! was a concert honoring theatre producer Cameron Mackintosh, performed in June 1998 as a benefit for the Royal National Institute of the Blind (RNIB) and the Combined Theatrical Charities.

Staged by Bob Avian, it was presented at the Lyceum Theatre in London on 7 – 8 June 1998, with the latter being a Royal Charity Gala in the presence of Queen Elizabeth II and the Duke of Edinburgh.

It featured performances from many of the hit musicals that Mackintosh has produced, including My Fair Lady, Oliver!, Little Shop of Horrors, The Fix, Godspell, Anything Goes, Song and Dance, The Boy Friend, Lauder, Five Guys Named Moe, Martin Guerre, Miss Saigon, The Phantom of the Opera, Follies, Oklahoma!, Carousel, Tom Foolery, Cats and Les Misérables, as well as a segment devoted to the work of Stephen Sondheim.

The show was hosted by Julie Andrews and the all-star cast performing these numbers included Tal Landsman, Liz Robertson, Jonathan Pryce, John Barrowman, Ellen Greene, Julian Lloyd Webber, Bernadette Peters, Russ Abbot, Sonia Swaby, David Campbell, Maria Friedman, Lea Salonga, Lisa Vroman, Colm Wilkinson, Michael Ball, Julia McKenzie, Hugh Jackman, Joanna Riding, Millicent Martin, David Kernan, Ruthie Henshall, Judi Dench, Tom Lehrer, Hal Fowler, Elaine Paige, Brian Blessed, Philip Quast, Adam Searles, Tee Jaye Jenkins, Trent Kendall, Monroe Kent III, Jason Pennycooke, Maria Charles, Richard D. Sharp and Feruma Williams. There was also a special performance by Stephen Sondheim and Andrew Lloyd Webber, who spoofed their own songs. Some of the songs from less successful Mackintosh shows were also a part of the performance, but not contained in the DVD or CD of the event, including songs from Moby Dick! The Musical.

The concert was filmed and recorded and has been released on CD, DVD and videotape.

== Song list ==
Act One

1. We Said We Wouldn't Look Back (from "Salad Days")
2. Overture (from "Cats")
3. Food Glorious Food (from "Oliver!")
4. My Fair Lady: Wouldn't It Be Loverly
5. Quit Professor Higgins
6. The Rain in Spain
7. Get Me to the Church On Time
8. I've Grown Accustomed to Her Face
9. Introduction (Julie Andrews)
10. One Two Three (from "The Fix")
11. Little Shop of Horrors (from "Little Shop Of Horrors")
12. Somewhere That's Green (from "Little Shop Of Horrors")
13. Suddenly Seymour (from "Little Shop Of Horrors")
14. Day by Day (from "Godspell")
15. I Get a Kick Out of You (from "Anything Goes")
16. Variations (from "Song & Dance")
17. Unexpected Song (from "Song & Dance")
18. Nicer in Nice (from "The Boy Friend")
19. I Love a Lassie (from "Lauder")
20. Five Guys Named Moe / Is You Is Or Is You Ain't My Baby?
21. Oliver!: Pick a Pocket
22. As Long as He Needs Me
23. Introduction (Julie Andrews)
24. Martin Guerre: I'm Martin Guerre
25. How Many Tears?
26. Miss Saigon: The Heat Is On in Saigon
27. The Wedding
28. The Last Night of the World
29. This Is the Hour
30. American Dream
31. The Phantom of the Opera: The Phantom of the Opera
32. Music of the Night
33. All I Ask of You (Reprise)

Act Two

1. Broadway Baby (from "Follies")
2. Oh, What a Beautiful Mornin' (from "Oklahoma!")
3. Carousel: Carousel Waltz / Ballet
4. Porch Scene
5. You'll Never Walk Alone
6. Introduction to the Sondheim section (Ned Sherrin)
7. Company: Side by Side
8. You Could Drive a Person Crazy
9. Send in the Clowns (from "A Little Night Music")
10. Losing My Mind (from "Follies")
11. Being Alive (from "Company")
12. You've Gotta Have a Gimmick (from "Gypsy")
13. Introduction (Stephen Sondheim)
14. Duelling Pianos - Sondheim and Lloyd Webber
15. Poisoning Pigeons in the Park (from "Tom Foolery")
16. Cats: Jellicle Songs
17. Memory
18. Les Misérables: At the End of the Day
19. I Dreamed a Dream
20. Stars
21. Do You Hear the People Sing?
22. On My Own
23. Bring Him Home
24. One Day More
25. Finale - Old Friends (from Merrily We Roll Along) Entire Company
