= Claude-Michel Schönberg =

French musical theatre composer (born 1944)

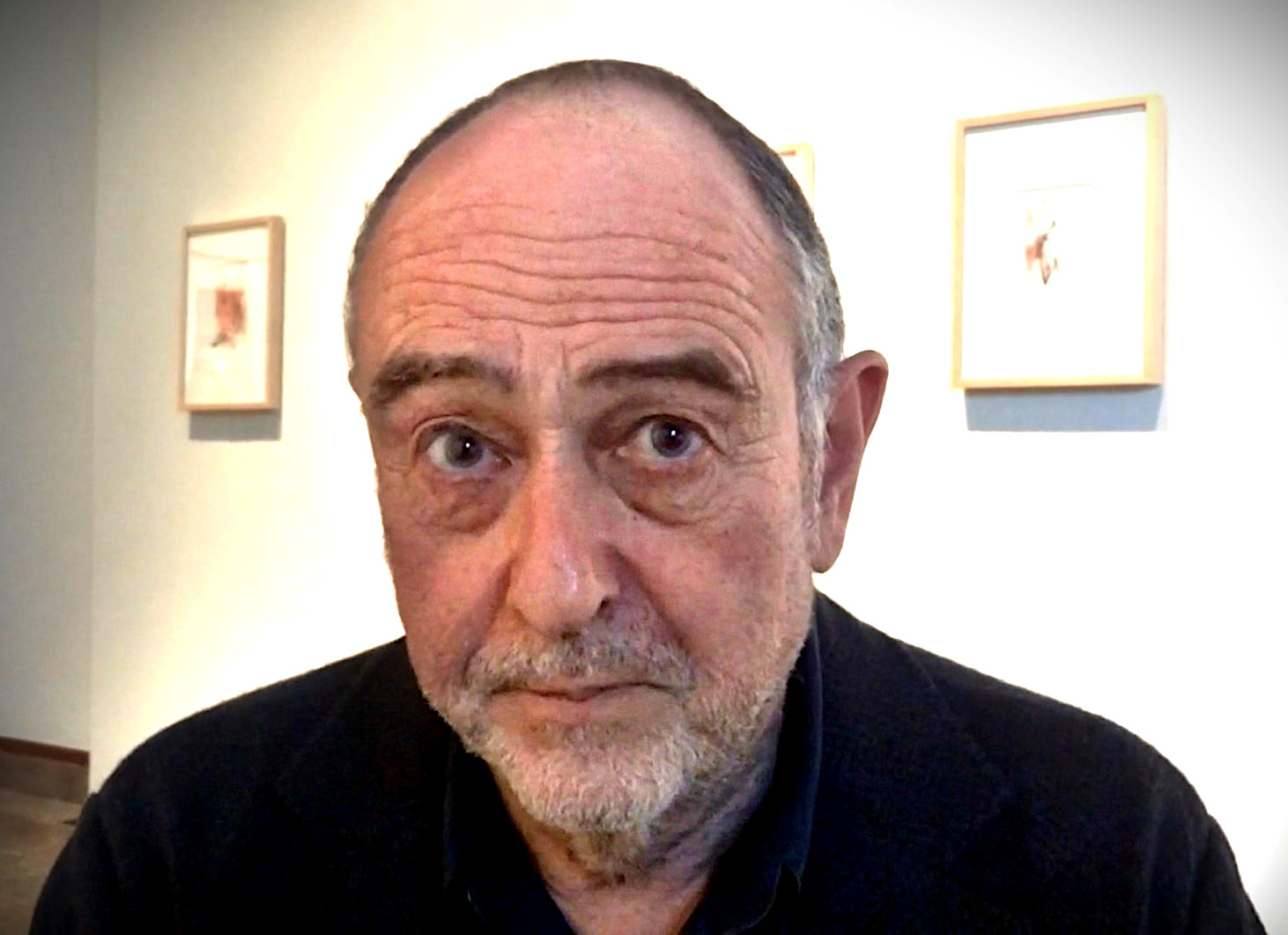
Schönberg in 2012

Claude-Michel Schönberg (born 6 July 1944) is a French record producer, actor, singer, songwriter, and musical theatre composer, best known for his collaborations with lyricist Alain Boublil. Major works include La Révolution Française (1973), Les Misérables (1980), Miss Saigon (1989), Martin Guerre (1996), The Pirate Queen (2006), and Marguerite (2008).

== Early life ==
Schönberg was born in Vannes, France, to Hungarian Jewish parents. His father was an organ repairer and his mother was a piano tuner.

== Career ==
=== Early career ===
Schönberg began his career as a record producer and a singer. He wrote most of the music for the French musical and rock opera La Révolution Française, France's first rock opera, in 1973. He played the role of King Louis XVI in the show's production that year.

In 1974 he wrote the music and the lyrics of the song "Le Premier Pas", which became the number one hit in France that year, selling over one million copies. "Le Premier Pas" was produced by Franck Pourcel. That year he also wrote a French version of the ABBA song "Waterloo", which was recorded by the group.

Schönberg then made an album in which he sang his own compositions. In 1978 he dedicated his attention to musicals when he and Alain Boublil conceived the idea for a stage musical version of Victor Hugo's Les Misérables. The original production was staged at the Palais de Sports in Paris in 1980. In 1985 and 1987 respectively, the musical opened in London and on Broadway, to acclaim in each instance. The Broadway production was nominated for twelve Tony Awards in 1987 and won eight, including Best Musical and Best Original Score.

In 1989, Schönberg and Boublil produced the London showing of the musical Miss Saigon, which starred Lea Salonga and Jonathan Pryce. In its transition to Broadway, the show broke advance-ticket sales, earning $24 million before its premiere on 11 April 1991. The show was nominated for ten Tony awards, including Best Musical and Best Original Score.

In 1997 Schönberg and Boublil premiered a new musical, Martin Guerre, at the Prince Edward Theatre in London. The musical won the 1997 Olivier Award and went on to tour the UK and the United States.

=== 2000 to present ===
In 2001, Schönberg composed his first ballet score, Wuthering Heights. This production was performed by the United Kingdom's Northern Ballet Theatre Company in September 2002.

Schönberg's next project with Boublil was The Pirate Queen, a musical about the 16th-century Irish pirate, chieftain and adventuress Grace O'Malley. The Pirate Queen completed its eight-week pre-Broadway tryout at Chicago's Cadillac Palace Theatre on 26 November 2006, and underwent further development in preparation for Broadway at the Hilton Theater in March 2007. The Broadway opening date was 5 April 2007. Miss Saigon co-lyricist Richard Maltby Jr. worked with Boublil on revisions to the book and lyrics, and Graciela Daniele worked on the musical staging.

Following a critical savaging and poor ticket sales, The Pirate Queen closed on 17 June 2007 after 85 performances and 32 previews, resulting in a loss of almost $18 million, ranking it among the largest commercial flops in Broadway history.

Les Misérables celebrated its twentieth anniversary in London on 8 October 2005. The Broadway production closed on 18 May 2003, making it the third-longest-running Broadway musical, following Cats and The Phantom of the Opera. Schönberg oversaw the production of Les Misérables that returned to Broadway for an intended six-month engagement at the Broadhurst Theatre on 9 November 2006, although it later extended its run.

Schönberg's Marguerite includes music by Michel Legrand and lyrics by Herbert Kretzmer. Set during World War II in occupied Paris, and inspired by the romantic novel La Dame aux camélias by Alexandre Dumas, fils, Marguerite is about the mistress of a high-ranking German officer who attracts the love of a musician half her age.

In 2011, Schönberg created the musical score for the ballet Cleopatra for the Northern Ballet, based in Leeds. Choreography is by the Ballet's artistic director David Nixon. The show toured the UK throughout 2011.

Schönberg was nominated for Best Original Song at the 70th Golden Globe Awards and in the same category at the 85th Academy Awards for the song "Suddenly" from the 2012 film version of Les Miserables.

== Personal life ==
He was formerly married to evening news anchor Béatrice Schönberg, with whom he has two children. In 2003, he married Charlotte Talbot, an English ballerina, with whom he has a daughter.

== Broadway productions ==
- The Pirate Queen: music, book, 5 April 2007 – 17 June 2007
- Les Misérables: music, book, 9 November 2006 – 6 January 2008
- Miss Saigon: music, book, 11 April 1991 – 28 January 2001
- Les Misérables: music, book, 12 March 1987 – 18 May 2003

== Awards ==
- 1987 Tony Award

== Decorations ==
- Officer of the Order of Arts and Letters (2016)
- Knight of the Legion of Honour (2024)
