= Daniel Lewis (choreographer) =

American choreographer and author (born 1944)

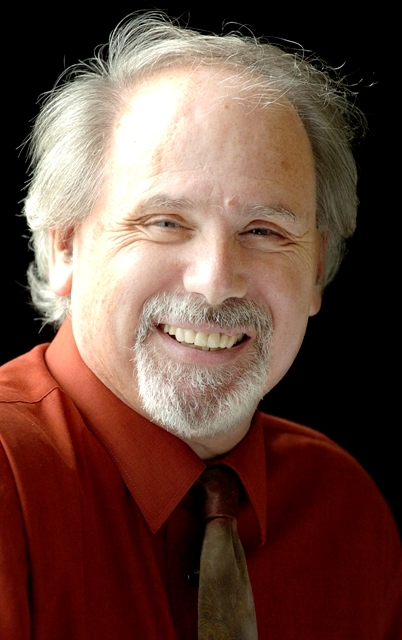
Daniel Lewis

Daniel Lewis (born July 12, 1944) is a U.S. choreographer and dance teacher, currently the Dean of Dance at the New World School of the Arts.

== Career ==
Lewis was born in Brooklyn, New York and graduated from the Fiorello H. LaGuardia High School of Music & Art and Performing Arts. Beginning in 1962, Lewis danced with the José Limón Dance Company for 12 years, originating many roles. As Limón's assistant, Lewis completed the choreography of the Waldstein Sonata. In addition, Lewis danced with the companies of Ruth Currier, Felix Fibich, Stuart Hodes, Sofie Maslow, David Wood, Norman Walker, Matthew Diamond, Charles Weidman, Anna Sokolow, the American Dance Theater, the Juilliard Dance Ensemble, Contemporary Dance System, and Daniel Lewis Dance.

In 1960 he worked a follow spot in the lighting at the East 74th Street Theater for George Gershwin's Oh, Kay! (with Linda Lavin, Penny Fuller, and Marti Stevens appearing as actors).

He danced in the Yiddish Theatre from 1960 to 1964. He danced in the CBS Productions of And David Wept (choreography by José Limón), Dreams (choreography by Anna Sokolow), Lamp Unto My Feet, and Camera Three, along with many PBS and WNET (NYC) programs.

Lewis joined the dance faculty of the Juilliard School in 1967, and was assistant to the school's Director of Dance, Martha Hill, between 1984 and 1987. He also served as an adjunct professor at New York University and a professor at Amherst College for six years. In 1987, Lewis joined the New World School of the Arts of the Miami Dade College as founding Dean of the Dance Department. Lewis established the dance division's eight-year Bachelor of Fine Arts (BFA) program. In 1988, he formed Miami Dance Futures, Inc., a production company for the Miami Balanchine Conference, the Dance History Scholars’ Conference, the National High School Dance Festival and the Daniel Lewis Dance Sampler.

In 2012, Lewis received an Honorary Doctor of Fine Arts Degree from the University of Florida.

== Published works ==
- Daniel Lewis, A Life in Choreography and the Art of Dance, McFarland & Company Publishers, ISBN 978-1-4766-8191-7 05/30/2020
- The Illustrated Dance Technique of Jose Limon, Princeton Book Company Publishers, ISBN 0-87127-209-1(also translated in German, Spanish and Japanese)
- Dance in Hispanic Cultures, M.E. Sharpe (June 1, 1994) ISBN 3-7186-5534-9
- Daniel Lewis: A life in Choreography and the Art of Dance, McFarland Publishers (May 30, 2020) ISBN 978-1-4766-8191-7
