= Omnium Gatherum (disambiguation) =

"Omnium gatherum" is a pseudo-Latin phrase meaning a miscellaneous collection of things or persons. It is also the title of a number of books.

Omnium Gatherum are a Finnish melodic death metal band.

Omnium Gatherum may also refer to:

- Omnium Gatherum (play), by Theresa Rebeck, 2003
- Omnium Gatherum (album), by King Gizzard & the Lizard Wizard, 2022
