= Alexandra Gersten-Vassilaros =

American playwright and actress (born 1960)

- Citizenship: American
- Education: New York University (MFA)
- Notable work: Omnium Gatherum

Alexandra I. Gersten-Vassilaros is an American playwright and actress. With Theresa Rebeck, she co-authored Omnium Gatherum, which was a finalist for the 2004 Pulitzer Prize for Drama.

Gersten-Vassilaros graduate from New York University's Tisch School of the Arts. She is a member of Actors Studio and HB Playwrights Foundation. She is a niece of theatrical producer Bernard Gersten.

== Selected works ==
=== As playwright ===
- My Thing of Love 1995
- Supple in Combat 1996
- The Airport Play 1999
- Mother Of Invention 2003
- Omnium Gatherum (co-author) 2003
- The Wedding Play 2004
- The Argument 2005
- Big Sky 2016

=== As actress ===
- Alone Together by Lawrence Roman, Music Box Theatre, 1984
- Loose Ends by Michael Weller, McGinn-Cazale Theatre, 1988
- Ladies by Eve Ensler, Theater at St. Clement's Church, 1989
- Fear, Anxiety & Depression written and directed by Todd Solondz, (Film), 1989
- Lusting After Pipino's Wife by Sam Henry Kass, Primary Stages, 1990
- Beautiful Child by Nicky Silver, Vineyard Theatre, 2004
