= The Elephant Man (play) =

1977 play by Bernard Pomerance

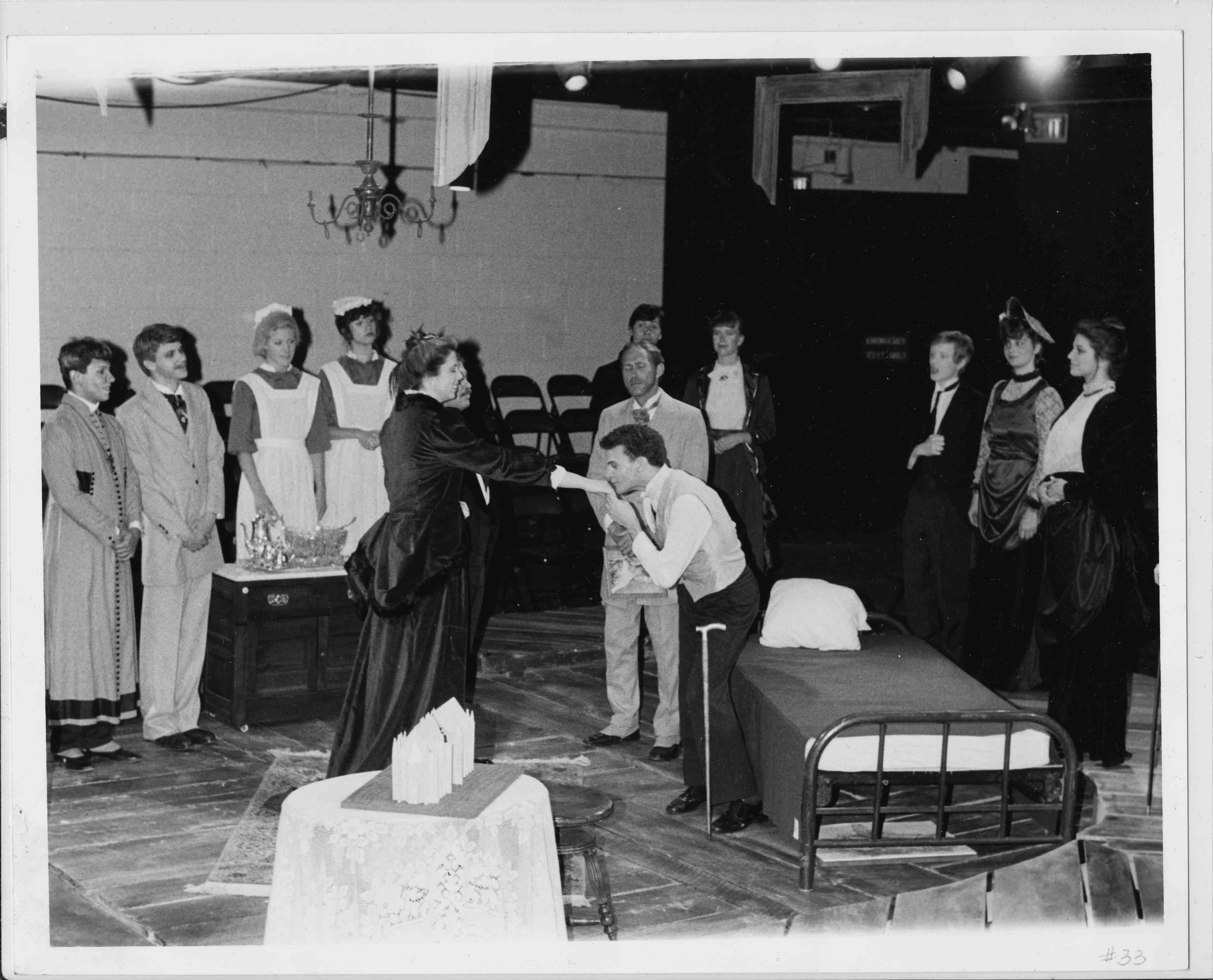
- The play performed at Otterbein University
- Original language: English
- Written by: Bernard Pomerance
- Characters: John Merrick; Frederick Treves; Mrs. Kendal; Carr Gomm; Orderly; Pinhead; Cellist
- Genre: Drama, tragedy
- Setting: Late 19th century; London, England

Premiere
- Date: 7 November 1977
- Place: Hampstead Theatre

The Elephant Man is a play by Bernard Pomerance. Originally co-produced by Hampstead Theatre under Artistic Director Michael Rudman and Foco Novo under Roland Rees, the play premiered at Nuffield Studio, Lancaster, 24 October 1977 and transferred to Hampstead the following month, opening in London 7 November 1977. Rees directed. The play was remounted in 1980 with Rees directing and some of the original cast reprising their roles at the National Theatre. The Elephant Man began its New York career off-Broadway at The Theatre of St. Peter's, moving to Broadway at the Booth Theatre in 1979, produced by Richmond Crinkley and Nelle Nugent and directed by Jack Hofsiss. David Bowie took over the lead as Merrick for several months in late 1980. The play closed in 1981 after eight previews and 916 regular performances, with revivals in 2002 and 2014.

The story is based on the life of Joseph Merrick, referred to in the script as John Merrick, who lived in Victorian London and is known for the extreme deformity of his body. The lead role of Merrick was originated by David Schofield, in a definitive performance. Subsequent productions starred actors including Philip Anglim, David Bowie, Mark Hamill, Bruce Davison, and Bradley Cooper.

== Plot ==
The Elephant Man opens with Frederick Treves, an up-and-coming surgeon, meeting his new employer Francis Carr-Gomm, the administrator of the London Hospital.

Ross, the manager of a freak show, invites a crowd on Whitechapel Road to come view John Merrick, the Elephant Man. Treves happens upon the freak show and is intrigued by Merrick's disorder. He insists that he must study Merrick further; Ross agrees, for a fee. Ross then gives a lecture on Merrick's anatomy, making Merrick stand on display while Treves describes his condition to the audience.

The freak show travels to Brussels after being driven out of London by the police. Merrick tries to converse with three freak show "pinheads", or people suffering from microcephaly and mental retardation. The "pinheads" go onstage to sing "We Are the Queens of the Congo", but the police will not allow Merrick to perform, because they consider his condition "indecent". Ross decides that Merrick is more trouble than he is worth, steals his savings, and sends him back to London.

When Merrick arrives in London, his appearance incites a crowd to riot. The train's conductor and a policeman are able to fetch Treves to calm the situation. Treves takes Merrick to the London Hospital and interviews a woman, Nurse Sandwich, for the position of Merrick's caretaker. Sandwich assures Treves that she has cared for lepers in Africa and is quite prepared for anything. However, when she sees Merrick taking a bath, she bolts from the room and refuses to take the job.

Bishop How visits Merrick and declares him a "true Christian in the rough". He tells Treves he would like to educate Merrick in religion. Carr-Gomm argues with Bishop How about the importance of science versus the importance of religion. Carr-Gomm announces that, due to a letter he had printed in The Times, the people of London have donated enough money to allow Merrick to live at the hospital for life. Treves tells Gomm that he is glad Merrick now has a place where he can stay without being stared at, and is determined that Merrick should lead a normal life.

When two attendants, Will and Snork, are caught peeking into Merrick's room, Will is fired and Snork is given a severe warning. Treves believes that it is important to enforce these rules, but Merrick worries what will happen to Will and his family. Merrick grew up in the workhouses, and wishes that no one had to suffer that fate. Treves says that it is just the way things are.

John Merrick has a visitor by the name of Madge Kendal, an actress who came across Carr-Gomm's section in the newspaper. When Mrs. Kendal meets Merrick, she requires all of her self-control in order to disguise her horror at Merrick’s appearance. After several minutes of strained conversation, Merrick mentions he is reading Romeo and Juliet, and Mrs. Kendal shares her experience in the role of Juliet. Merrick amazes Mrs. Kendal with his thoughtful and sensitive views on Romeo and the nature of love. Mrs. Kendal says that she will bring some of her friends to meet Merrick, then shakes his hand and tells him how truly pleased she is to meet him. Merrick dissolves into tears as Treves tells Mrs. Kendal that it is the first time a woman has ever shaken his hand.

Mrs. Kendal's high society friends visit Merrick and bring him gifts while he builds a model of St. Phillip's church with his one good hand. He tells Mrs. Kendal that St. Phillip’s Church is an imitation of grace, and his model is therefore an imitation of an imitation. When Treves comments that all of humanity is a mere illusion of heaven, Merrick says that God should have used both hands. Merrick's new friends—Bishop How, Gomm, the Duchess, Princess Alexandra, Treves, and Mrs. Kendal—all comment upon how, in different ways, they see themselves reflected in him. However, Treves notes that even though Merrick has become popular, his condition is worsening with time.

Merrick tells Mrs. Kendal that he needs a mistress and suggests that he would like her to do that for him. Mrs. Kendal listens compassionately, but she tells Merrick that it is unlikely that he will ever have a mistress. Merrick admits that he has never even seen a naked woman. Mrs. Kendal is flattered by his show of trust in her, and she realizes that she has come to trust him. She undresses and allows him to see her naked body. Treves enters and is shocked, sending Mrs. Kendal away.

Ross comes to the hospital to ask Merrick to rejoin the freak show. Ross's health has drastically worsened, and he tells Merrick that without help he is doomed to a painful death. He tries to convince Merrick to charge the society members who visit him. Merrick refuses to help Ross, finally standing up to him after suffering years of abuse at his hands. Ross makes one final pathetic plea to Merrick, who refuses him, saying that's just the way things are.

Merrick asks Treves what he believes about God and heaven. Then he confronts Treves, criticizing what he did to Mrs. Kendal and the rigid standards by which he judges everybody. Treves realizes that he has been too harsh with Merrick and tells him that although he will write to Mrs. Kendal, he does not believe she will return. After Merrick leaves the room, Treves says that it is because he does not want her to see Merrick die.

Treves has a nightmare that he has been put on display while Merrick delivers a lecture about his terrifying normality, his rigidity, and the acts of cruelty he can commit upon others "for their own good".

Carr-Gomm and Treves discuss Merrick's impending death. Treves displays frustration at the fact that the more normal Merrick pretends to be, the worse his condition becomes. He confronts Bishop How, telling him that he believes Merrick’s faith is merely another attempt to emulate others. It comes out that the real source of his frustrations is the chaos of the world around him, with his patients seemingly doing everything they can to shorten their own lives. No matter how hard he tries he cannot help them, just as he cannot help Merrick. He finally begs for the bishop to help him.

Merrick finishes his model of the church. As usual, he goes to sleep while sitting, a posture which he must adopt due to the weight of his head. As he sleeps he sees visions of the pinheads, now singing that they are the Queens of the Cosmos. They lay him down to sleep normally, and he dies. Snork discovers his body and runs out screaming that the Elephant Man is dead.

In the final scene, Carr-Gomm reads a letter he has written to The Times, outlining Merrick’s stay at the hospital, his death and his plans for the remaining funds donated for Merrick's care. When he asks Treves if he has anything else to add, a distressed Treves says he does not and leaves. As Carr-Gomm finishes the letter Treves rushes back in, saying that he’s thought of something. Carr-Gomm tells the doctor that it is too late: it is done.

== Original Cast, Hampstead Theatre, London, 1977 ==
- David Schofield as John Merrick
- David Allister as Dr Treves, Belgian Policeman
- Arthur Blake as Bishop Walsham Howe, Ross, Snork
- William Hoyland as Francis Carr-Gomm
- Pat Arrowsmith as Cellist
- Jennie Stoller as Countess, Mrs Kendal, Pinhead
- Judy Bridgland as Duchess, Princess Alexandra, Jelly Willow, Nurse Sandwich, Pinhead
- Ken Drury, England Policeman, Lord John, Manager of Pinheads, Porter, Willow

== Broadway production, New York, 1979 ==
- Philip Anglim as John Merrick
- JoAnne Belanger as Orderly (understudy), Princess Alexandra (understudy), Pinhead (understudy), Countess (understudy), Miss Sandwich (understudy)
- Richard Clarke as Francis Carr-Gomm, Conductor
- Kevin Conway as Frederick Treves, Belgian Policeman
- Dennis Creaghan as Orderly, London Policeman (understudy), Lord John (understudy), Will (understudy), Earl (understudy), Pinhead Manager (understudy)
- Michael Goldschlager as Cellist (standby)
- Cordis Heard as Miss Sandwich, Princess Alexandra, Pinhead, Countess, Mrs. Kendal (understudy)
- David Heiss as Cellist
- I. M. Hobson as Bishop Walsham How, Ross, Snork
- John Neville-Andrews as Pinhead Manager, London Policeman, Lord John, Will, Earl, Frederick Treves (understudy), Belgian Policeman (understudy)
- Carole Shelley as Pinhead, Mrs. Kendal
- Jack Wetherall as John Merrick (standby)

== National Theatre, London, 1980 ==
The Hampstead production was remounted on the Lyttelton stage with some members of the original cast including David Schofield, Arthur Blake, and Jennie Stoller reprising their roles. Treves was played by Peter McEnery followed by Nicky Henson. Roland Rees directed again. The run was just under a year. Schofield was nominated for an Olivier Award as Actor of the Year in a New Play.

== 2002 revival, New York ==
A revival of the production was staged at the Royale Theatre on Broadway in April 2002, running for 57 performances, and closed on 2 June 2002. It was directed by Sean Mathias and starred Billy Crudup, Rupert Graves and Kate Burton in the leading roles and James Riordan and Jack Gilpin portraying several supporting roles each. Crudup (Best Actor in a Play) and Burton (Best Featured Actress in a Play) each received nominations at the 56th Tony Awards.

== 2014–15 revival, New York and London ==
A 2014 revival, starring Bradley Cooper, Patricia Clarkson, and Alessandro Nivola, opened at the Booth Theatre on 7 December for a 13-week engagement (through 15 February 2015). Cooper, who appeared as Merrick in a revival at the 2012 Williamstown Theatre Festival, reprised his role. Scott Ellis, who directed the Williamstown production, also staged the Broadway return. In May 2015, the production, again starring Cooper, Clarkson, and Nivola, opened at London's Theatre Royal Haymarket for a limited 12-week run from 19 May until 8 August.

== Adaptations ==
The play was adapted for television by Steve Lawson and broadcast in 1982 on ABC. Philip Anglim reprised his Broadway performance and Hofsiss returned to direct. At the 34th Primetime Emmy Awards, the production was nominated for Outstanding Drama Special, while Anglim was nominated for Outstanding Lead Actor in a Limited Series or a Special and Penny Fuller, for her performance as Mrs. Kendal, won for Outstanding Supporting Actress in a Limited Series or a Special.

A radio drama adaptation by the BBC World Service was broadcast in 1988. It was directed by David Hitchenson and starred Gerard Murphy as John Merrick the elephant man; Jeremy Clyde as Frederick Treves the doctor; Anna Massey as actress Mrs. Kendal.

In May 2025, a new feature film adaptation of the play was announced, with filming scheduled to begin in spring 2026. Written by playwright Bernard Pomerance's son Moby Pomerance, the film will star Adam Pearson as Joseph Merrick. Pearson will be the first disabled actor to play this role.

== Awards and nominations ==
=== Off-Broadway Production (1979) ===
The first New York City production was off-Broadway, from January to March 1979 (73 shows). It transferred to Broadway in April 1979.

| Year | Award | Category | Nominee | Result |
|---|---|---|---|---|
| 1979 | Obie Award | Playwriting | Bernard Pomerance | Won |
| 1979 | Obie Award | Direction | Jack Hofsiss | Won |
| 1979 | Obie Award | Outstanding Actor in a Play | Philip Anglim | Won |

=== Original Broadway Production (1979) ===
| Year | Award | Category | Nominee | Result |
|---|---|---|---|---|
| 1979 | New York Drama Critics' Circle Awards | Best Play | | Won |
| 1979 | Drama Desk Awards | Outstanding New Play | | Won |
| 1979 | Drama Desk Awards | Outstanding Director of a Play | Jack Hofsiss | Won |
| 1979 | Drama Desk Awards | Outstanding Actor in a Play | Philip Anglim | Won |
| 1979 | Drama Desk Awards | Outstanding Actress in a Play | Carole Shelley (Note: Tied with Constance Cummings for Wings.) | Won |
| 1979 | Drama Desk Awards | Outstanding Featured Actor in a Play | I.M. Hobson | Nominated |
| 1979 | Drama Desk Awards | Outstanding Costume Design | Julie Weiss | Nominated |
| 1979 | Drama Desk Awards | Outstanding Lighting Design | Beverly Emmons | Nominated |
| 1979 | Tony Awards | Best Play | | Won |
| 1979 | Tony Awards | Best Direction of a Play | Jack Hofsiss | Won |
| 1979 | Tony Awards | Best Performance by a Leading Actor in a Play | Philip Anglim | Nominated |
| 1979 | Tony Awards | Best Performance by a Leading Actress in a Play | Carole Shelley (Note: Tied with Constance Cummings for Wings.) | Won |
| 1979 | Tony Awards | Best Scenic Design | David Jenkins | Nominated |
| 1979 | Tony Awards | Best Costume Design | Julie Weiss | Nominated |

Honor

- 1979 Selection, The Burns Mantle Theater Yearbook, The Best Plays of 1978-1979

=== 2002 Broadway Revival ===
| Year | Award | Category | Nominee | Result |
|---|---|---|---|---|
| 2002 | Tony Awards | Best Performance by a Leading Actor in a Play | Billy Crudup | Nominated |
| 2002 | Tony Awards | Best Performance by a Featured Actress in a Play | Kate Burton | Nominated |

=== 2014 Broadway Revival ===
| Year | Award | Category | Nominee | Result |
|---|---|---|---|---|
| 2015 | Tony Awards | Best Revival of a Play | | Nominated |
| 2015 | Tony Awards | Best Performance by a Leading Actor in a Play | Bradley Cooper | Nominated |
| 2015 | Tony Awards | Best Performance by a Featured Actor in a Play | Alessandro Nivola | Nominated |
| 2015 | Tony Awards | Best Performance by a Featured Actress in a Play | Patricia Clarkson | Nominated |
