= Lisa Lyons (disambiguation) =

Lisa Lyon or Lyons may refer to:

- Lisa Posthumus Lyons (born 1980), American politician
- Lisa Lyon (born 1953), American bodybuilder
- Lisa Lyons, a fictional character in the 2011 play The Lyons
