= Take Me to the World: A Sondheim 90th Birthday Celebration =

Virtual concert in 2020

- Genre: Musical benefit concert
- Directed by: Paul Wontorek
- Opening theme: "Prologue" from Follies
- Ending theme: "I'm Still Here" from Follies
- Composer: Stephen Sondheim
- Country of origin: United States
- Original language: English

Production
- Executive producers: Mary-Mitchell Campbell; Bill Curran; Raúl Esparza; Paul Wontorek
- Producer: Raúl Esparza
- Production location: Virtual
- Animator: Ryan Casey
- Editors: Jim Cocoliato; Alexander Goyco; Mike Karns; Nick Shakra; Ryan Simmons
- Camera setup: Single-camera
- Running time: 143 minutes
- Production company: Broadway.com

Original release
- Network: Syndication
- Release: April 26, 2020

Take Me to the World: A Sondheim 90th Birthday Celebration was a virtual concert celebrating the 90th birthday of Broadway composer Stephen Sondheim. The event also served as a fundraiser for Artists Striving to End Poverty (ASTEP).

Hosted by Raúl Esparza, whose appearances were curtailed due to technical difficulties, the concert featured many celebrities with ties to Sondheim singing his songs, alongside others offering birthday greetings between performances.

== Context and timing ==
The April 26, 2020 livestream date coincided with the 50th anniversary of the opening night of the original Broadway production of Company. The 2020 Broadway revival of that show, originally slated to open March 22 on Sondheim's birthday proper, had been scuttled by the closure of all Broadway productions due to the coronavirus pandemic.

== Performances ==
In order of appearance

| Performer(s) | Song | Show | Significance |
|---|---|---|---|
| Stephen Schwartz | "Prologue" | Follies | Fellow Broadway composer |
| Broadway musicians | "Overture" | Merrily We Roll Along | —N/a |
| Sutton Foster | "There Won't Be Trumpets" | Anyone Can Whistle | Nurse Fay Apple in the Encores! concert of Anyone Can Whistle; The Baker's Wife in Into the Woods at the Hollywood Bowl |
| Neil Patrick Harris | "Prologue" (The Witch's rap) | Into the Woods | Lee Harvey Oswald / The Balladeer in the original Broadway production of Assassins; Bobby in the 2011 New York Philharmonic concert of Company; Tobias Ragg in the San Francisco Symphony Orchestra concert of Sweeney Todd: The Demon Barber of Fleet Street; Charles in the 2001 recording of Evening Primrose |
| Kelli O'Hara | "What More Do I Need?" | Saturday Night | Young Hattie/Ensemble in the Broadway revival production of Follies |
| Judy Kuhn | "What Can You Lose?" | Dick Tracy (film) | Fosca in the Off-Broadway production of Passion |
| Katrina Lenk | "Johanna" | Sweeney Todd: The Demon Barber of Fleet Street | Bobbie in the third Broadway revival production of Company |
| Aaron Tveit | "Marry Me a Little" | Company | John Wilkes Booth in the West End revival production of Assassins; Bobby in the Barrington Stage Company production of Company |
| Beanie Feldstein and Ben Platt | "It Takes Two" | Into the Woods | Mary Flynn and Charley Kringas respectively in the upcoming film adaptation of Merrily We Roll Along |
| Brandon Uranowitz | "With So Little to Be Sure Of" | Anyone Can Whistle | Addison Mizner in the Encores! concert of Road Show |
| Melissa Errico | "Children and Art" | Sunday in the Park with George | Dot/Marie in the Washington, D.C. production of Sunday in the Park with George; Clara in the Off-Broadway production of Passion; Leona Samish in Encores! concert of Do I Hear a Waltz? Her 2018 recording Sondheim Sublime |
| Randy Rainbow | "By the Sea" | Sweeney Todd: The Demon Barber of Fleet Street | Adapted musical parodies of Into the Woods "Prologue" and Follies "God-Why-Don't-You-Love-Me Blues" for political satire |
| Elizabeth Stanley | "The Miller's Son" | A Little Night Music | April in the second Broadway revival of Company; Gussie Carnegie in the Encores! concert of Merrily We Roll Along |
| Mandy Patinkin | "Lesson #8" | Sunday in the Park with George | Georges Seurat/George in the original Broadway production of Sunday in the Park with George; Buddy Plummer in Lincoln Center's Follies in Concert |
| Maria Friedman | "Broadway Baby" | Follies | Dot/Marie in the original West End production of Sunday in the Park with George; Fosca in the original West End production of Passion; Mary Flynn in a London production of Merrily We Roll Along; Directed the West End revival of Merrily We Roll Along |
| Lin-Manuel Miranda | "Giants in the Sky" | Into the Woods | Fellow Broadway composer Charley Kringas in the Encores! concert of Merrily We Roll Along |
| Lea Salonga | "Loving You" | Passion | The Witch in the Singaporean production of Into the Woods; Mrs. Lovett in the Philippines production of Sweeney Todd: The Demon Barber of Fleet Street |
| Laura Benanti | "I Remember" | Evening Primrose | Cinderella in the Broadway revival production of Into the Woods; Louise in the fourth Broadway revival of Gypsy; Anne in the Los Angeles Opera production of A Little Night Music |
| Chip Zien | "No More" | Into the Woods | The Baker in the original Broadway production of Into the Woods; The Mysterious Man in the Central Park production of Into the Woods |
| Josh Groban | "Children Will Listen" / "Not While I'm Around" | Into the Woods / Sweeney Todd: The Demon Barber of Fleet Street | Covered the aforementioned songs on his album Stages |
| Brian Stokes Mitchell | "The Flag Song" | Assassins (cut song) | Sweeney Todd in the Encores! concert of Sweeney Todd: The Demon Barber of Fleet Street; Cast member in Library of Congress concert version of The Frogs |
| Michael Cerveris | "Finishing the Hat" | Sunday in the Park with George | John Wilkes Booth in the original Broadway production of Assassins; Sweeney Todd in the second Broadway revival of Sweeney Todd: The Demon Barber of Fleet Street; Wilson Mizner in the Off-Broadway production of Road Show |
| Linda Lavin | "The Boy From..." | The Mad Show | Cast member of The Mad Show; Rose (replacement) in the second Broadway revival of Gypsy; Hattie Walker in Kennedy Center production of Follies |
| Alexander Gemignani | "Buddy's Blues" | Follies | John Hinckley in the original Broadway production of Assassins; Beadle Bamford in the second Broadway revival of Sweeney Todd: The Demon Barber of Fleet Street; Addison Mizner in the Off-Broadway production of Road Show |
| Ann Harada, Austin Ku, Kelvin Moon Loh, and Thom Sesma | "Someone In a Tree" | Pacific Overtures | Cast members of the Off-Broadway revival cast of Pacific Overtures |
| Raúl Esparza | "Take Me to the World" | Evening Primrose | Georges Seurat/George in the Sondheim Celebration production of Sunday in the Park with George; Charley Kringas in the Sondheim Celebration production of Merrily We Roll Along; Bobby in the second Broadway revival production of Company; Hapgood in the Encores! concert of Anyone Can Whistle; Wilson Mizner in the Encores! concert of Road Show |
| Donna Murphy | "Send In the Clowns" | A Little Night Music | Fosca in the original Broadway production of Passion; Phyllis Rogers Stone in the Encores! concert of Follies; Mayoress in the Encores! concert of Anyone Can Whistle; The Witch in the Central Park production of Into the Woods |
| Christine Baranski, Meryl Streep, and Audra McDonald | "The Ladies Who Lunch" | Company | Baranski: Clarisse in the original Off-Broadway production of Sunday in the Park with George; Mrs. Lovett in the Sondheim Celebration production of Sweeney Todd: The Demon Barber of Fleet Street; Cinderella's Stepmother in the film adaptation of Into the Woods; Phyllis in the London production of Follies; Carlotta Campion in the Encores! concert of Follies; Streep: The Witch in the film adaptation of Into the Woods, Ensemble member in original production of The Frogs; McDonald: Clara in the Live from Lincoln Center production of Passion; Beggar Woman in the Live from Lincoln Center production and New York Philharmonic concert of Sweeney Todd: The Demon Barber of Fleet Street; Clara and Nurse Fay Apple at the Ravinia Festival Concerts of Passion and Anyone Can Whistle respectively |
| Jake Gyllenhaal and Annaleigh Ashford | "Move On" | Sunday in the Park with George | Georges Seurat/George and Dot/Marie, respectively, in the second Broadway revival of Sunday in the Park with George |
| Patti LuPone | "Anyone Can Whistle" | Anyone Can Whistle | Mrs. Lovett in the New York Philharmonic concert and third Broadway revival of Sweeney Todd: The Demon Barber of Fleet Street; Fosca in the Live from Lincoln Center production of Passion; Rose in the fourth Broadway revival of Gypsy; Joanne in the New York Philharmonic concert, second West End, and third Broadway revivals of Company; Mrs. Lovett, Desiree Armfeldt, Fosca, Yvonne, Cora Hoover Hooper, and Rose in the Ravinia Festival concerts of Sweeney Todd: The Demon Barber of Fleet Street, A Little Night Music, Passion, Sunday in the Park with George, Anyone Can Whistle, and Gypsy respectively |
| Bernadette Peters | "No One Is Alone" | Into the Woods | Dot/Marie in the original Broadway production of Sunday in the Park with George; The Witch in the original Broadway production of Into the Woods; Fay in the 1995 Carnegie Hall concert of Anyone Can Whistle; Rose in the third Broadway revival of Gypsy; Desiree (second replacement) in the second Broadway revival of A Little Night Music; Sally in the third Broadway revival of Follies; Recorded the albums Sondheim, Etc. – Bernadette Peters Live At Carnegie Hall and Sondheim Etc., Etc. Live At Carnegie Hall: The Rest of It |
| Company | "I'm Still Here" | Follies | —N/a |

== Other appearances ==
In order of first appearance

| Individual | Significance | Notes |
|---|---|---|
| Emily Dale Griffin | Sutton Foster's daughter | |
| Gideon Scott Burtka-Harris | Neil Patrick Harris's son | Featured in The Witch's rap |
| Harper Grace Burtka-Harris | Neil Patrick Harris's daughter | Featured in The Witch's rap |
| Victor Garber | Anthony Hope in original Broadway production of Sweeney Todd: The Demon Barber of Fleet Street; John Wilkes Booth in the original Off-Broadway production of Assassins; Ben Stone in the Encores! concert of Follies | |
| Iain Armitage | —N/a | |
| Steven Spielberg | Director of film adaptation of West Side Story | |
| Lonny Price | Charley Kringas in the original Broadway production of Merrily We Roll Along; Director of productions of Sweeney Todd, Company, Passion, Sunday in the Park with George, and Anyone Can Whistle | |
| Joanna Gleason | Baker's Wife in original Broadway production of Into the Woods | |
| John Weidman | Librettist of Pacific Overtures, Assassins, and Road Show | |
| Jason Alexander | Joe Josephson in original Broadway production of Merrily We Roll Along | |
| Nathan Lane | Co-librettist of and Dionysus in The Frogs, Pseudolus in the Broadway revival of A Funny Thing Happened on the Way to the Forum | |
