= Linda Lavin =

American actress and singer (1937–2024)

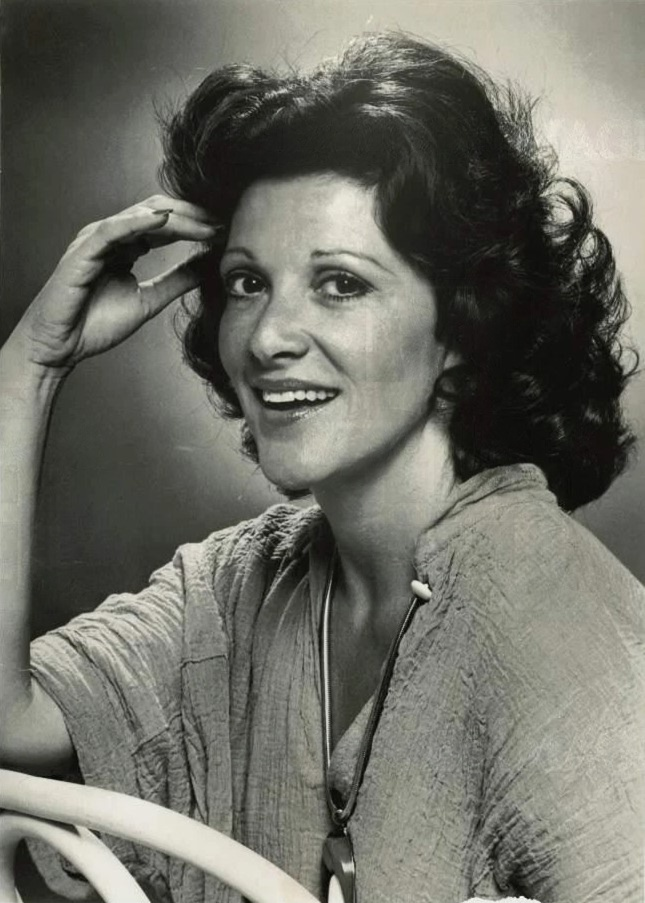
- Lavin in a publicity photo of Alice (1976)
- Born: October 15, 1937; Portland, Maine, U.S.
- Died: December 29, 2024 (aged 87); Los Angeles, California, U.S.
- Education: College of William & Mary; HB Studio
- Occupations: Actress; singer
- Years active: 1958–2024
- Known for: Alice; Broadway Bound; Barney Miller
- Spouses: Ron Leibman (m. 1969; div. 1981) Kip Niven (m. 1982; div. 1992) Steve Bakunas (m. 2005)
- Awards: American Theater Hall of Fame

Linda Lavin (/ˈlævɪn/; October 15, 1937 – December 29, 2024) was an American actress and singer. Known for her roles on stage and screen, she received several awards including three Drama Desk Awards, two Golden Globe Awards, two Obie Awards, and a Tony Award, as well as nominations for a Daytime Emmy Award and a Primetime Emmy Award. She was inducted into the American Theater Hall of Fame in 2010.

After acting as a child, Lavin joined the Compass Players in the late 1950s. She had a guest role role in Rhoda, and had a recurring role in Barney Miller (1975–1976). She gained fame for playing the title role of a waitress at a roadside diner in the CBS sitcom Alice (1976–1985), a role for which she was nominated for the Primetime Emmy Award for Outstanding Lead Actress in a Comedy Series and won two consecutive Golden Globe Awards for Best Actress in a Television Series – Musical or Comedy. She later starred in NBC's sitcom Sean Saves the World and the CBS sitcom 9JKL and took recurring roles in the legal drama The Good Wife (2014–2015) and the sitcom B Positive (2020–2022).

On stage, she won the Tony Award for Best Actress in a Play playing a strong-willed mother in the Neil Simon play Broadway Bound (1987). She was Tony-nominated for her roles in Last of the Red Hot Lovers (1970), The Diary of Anne Frank (1998), The Tale of the Allergist's Wife (2001), Collected Stories (2010), and The Lyons (2012). She is also known for acting in It's a Bird... It's a Plane... It's Superman (1966), On a Clear Day You Can See Forever (1967), Gypsy (1990), The Sisters Rosensweig (1993), and Follies (2011). She made her film debut in The Muppets Take Manhattan (1984), and later had roles in I Want to Go Home (1989), See You in the Morning (1989) and Being the Ricardos (2021).

== Early life, family and education ==
Lavin was born in Portland, Maine, the younger daughter of David Joseph Lavin, a businessman, and Lucille Dorothy (née Potter), an opera singer. The Lavin family were active members of the local Jewish community. Both sets of grandparents emigrated from Russia. Her family was musically talented, and Lavin was on stage from the age of five.

She attended Waynflete School and Deering High School before enrolling in the College of William & Mary.

She studied acting at HB Studio in New York City.

== Career ==
=== Early years ===
In the summer of 1958, she played one of the leads in The Common Glory, an outdoor drama written by Paul Green and staged at an amphitheater on campus. Upon her graduation from college, she had already received her Actors' Equity Association card. She was a member of the Compass Players in the late 1950s.

=== Theater ===
In 1960 Lavin appeared at the East 74th Street Theater in George Gershwin's Oh, Kay!, with Penny Fuller and Marti Stevens.

Lavin began her career with Broadway appearances in the musical A Family Affair (1962) and plays such as The Riot Act (1963) and Carl Reiner's Something Different (1967). In his New York Times review of John Guare's two one-act plays, Cop-Out (1969), Clive Barnes wrote: "Miss Lavin...carries versatility almost to the point of paranoia, and camps up a storm."

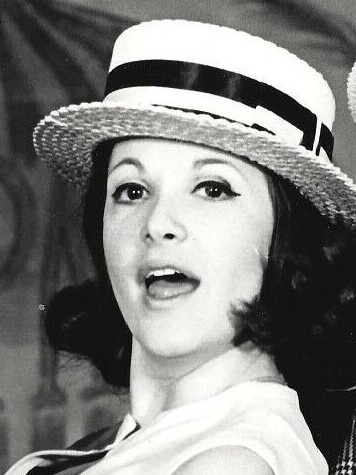
Lavin in a publicity photo in 1965

Lavin also appeared in numerous Off-Broadway productions, including the revue Wet Paint (1965), the musical The Mad Show (1966) (in which she introduced the cabaret standard "The Boy From...", written by Stephen Sondheim and Mary Rodgers), and Little Murders (1969). Lavin won the Theatre World Award for Wet Paint and a Drama Desk Award for Little Murders. In 1975, she appeared in the Shakespeare in the Park production of The Comedy of Errors at the Delacorte Theater.

She "arrived at showbiz stardom with a featured role" in the musical It's a Bird...It's a Plane...It's Superman (1966). She received her first Tony Award nomination in 1970, for her role in the Neil Simon play Last of the Red Hot Lovers (1969). Clive Barnes, in his review for The New York Times, wrote: "Linda Lavin, eyebrows, [sic] flaunting like telegraphed messages, mouth twitching and pouting, voice as dry as thunder and with a cough like electric static, is beautiful as Elaine, the sex cat feeling coolly kittenish and looking for a safe tin roof." Lavin's last Broadway credit before she moved to Hollywood was in Paul Sills' Story Theatre in 1971.

In 1984, Lavin played the character of "The Mother" in Luigi Pirandello's Six Characters in Search of an Author in a production directed by Robert Brustein at the American Repertory Theatre in Cambridge, Massachusetts.

After more than a decade away, Lavin returned to the Broadway stage in 1987, winning a Tony Award for Best Actress in a Play and her second Drama Desk Award for her role as Kate in Simon's play Broadway Bound. In his review in The New York Times, Frank Rich wrote: "One only wishes that Ms. Lavin, whose touching performance is of the same high integrity as the writing, could stay in the role forever." Theatre critic Charles McNulty wrote of her performance that it "is widely considered one of the most memorable in contemporary Broadway history, winning not just awards but praise approaching the level of myth. The theater critic Gordon Rogoff, extolling 'the power available only to an actor at the height of her own command of detail,' went so far as to describe Lavin's portrayal as 'one of those textbook lessons in great acting...' "

She then starred on Broadway in Gypsy as Mama Rose Hovick, replacing Tyne Daly in July 1990. June Havoc saw Lavin's performance in Gypsy and sent Lavin a photo of Havoc's mother, the real Rose Hovick, with a note of appreciation for Lavin's portrayal of the character.

Her subsequent Broadway roles included The Sisters Rosensweig, as a replacement Gorgeous Teitelbaum starting in September 1993 and Mrs. Van Daan in The Diary of Anne Frank (1997–1998), opposite Natalie Portman, for which she garnered a Tony nomination as Featured Actress in a Play. In 1995 she appeared in the Off-Broadway Death-Defying Acts, which consists of three one-act plays; Lavin performed in the Elaine May (Hotline) and Woody Allen plays (Central Park West). She was nominated for a Drama Desk Award (Outstanding Actress – Play) and won an Obie Award (Performance) and the Lucille Lortel Award. She also directed theater during this period.

She played Marjorie in The Tale of the Allergist's Wife (2000–2001), co-starring Tony Roberts and Michele Lee, for which she was nominated for a Tony Award, Leading Actress in a Play, and Drama Desk Award, and "nanny" for Helen (young Carol Burnett, played by Sara Niemietz and Donna Lynne Champlin) in Hollywood Arms in Chicago and on Broadway in 2002.

In 2010, Lavin appeared as Ruth Steiner in a Broadway revival of the play Collected Stories opposite Sarah Paulson as her student, reprising her role for a PBS production of the play, and received a fifth Tony nomination for the role. She appeared in a new play by Jon Robin Baitz, Other Desert Cities, Off-Broadway at the Mitzi Newhouse Theater at Lincoln Center, beginning in previews in December 2010, closing February 27, 2011. Lavin was featured in the Kennedy Center (Washington, DC) production of the musical Follies, from May 2011 to June 2011, as Hattie Walker.

She appeared in the premiere of the Nicky Silver play The Lyons at the Off-Broadway Vineyard Theatre, beginning in September 2011, through November 11. Ben Brantley, The New York Times reviewer, commented: "Watching Ms. Lavin, I found myself thinking of Nora from Ibsen's Doll's House – well, a pursed-lipped, lemony-sour, older Nora in pseudo-Chanel, one who's never at a loss for what to say and when to say it. Rita may be a little behind schedule in discovering herself, but no one can fault the hair-trigger timing of the actress playing her or the surprising dimensions she finds within one-liners." She reprised her role in the Broadway production, which opened at the Cort Theatre on April 23, 2012, and closed on July 1, 2012.

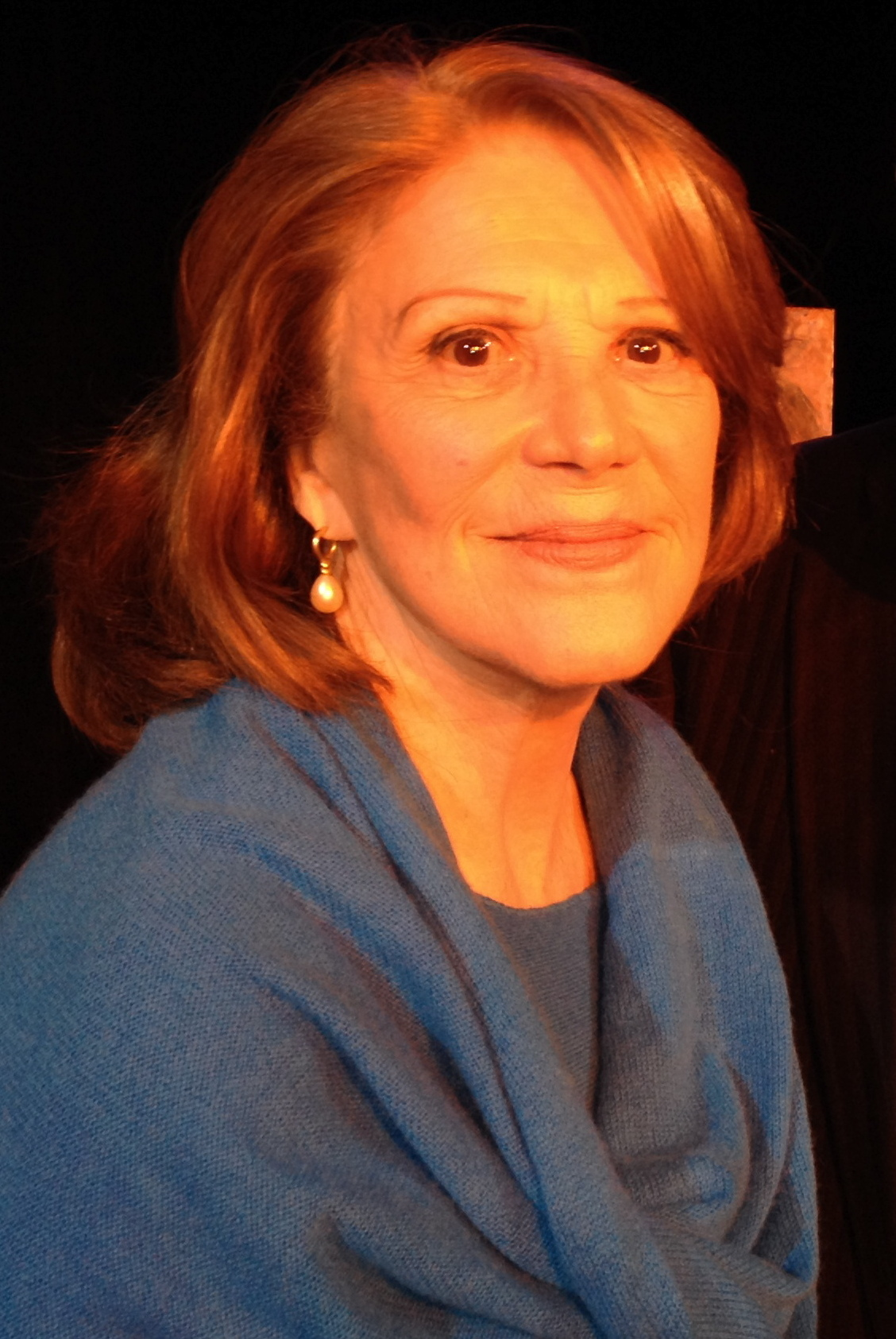
Lavin in 2014

Lavin appeared in the Nicky Silver play Too Much Sun, which opened Off-Broadway at the Vineyard Theatre on May 18, 2014. Ben Brantley, in his review for The New York Times wrote: "And it's an unconditional treat to witness an actress like Ms. Lavin tuned so precisely into the writer's wavelength that script and performance become a marriage of true minds."

Lavin appeared in 2015/16 on Broadway at the Samuel J. Friedman Theatre in a Manhattan Theatre Club production of Richard Greenberg's Our Mother's Brief Affair.

In January 2017, Lavin appeared in New York City Opera's production of Leonard Bernstein's Candide at the Rose Theatre at Lincoln Center in the role of The Old Lady.

In 2020, Lavin performed "The Boy From..." as part of Take Me to the World: A Sondheim 90th Birthday Celebration. Writing in The New York Times, critic Ben Brantley called her performance of the song "deliciously undersold," and noted that she had introduced it 54 years earlier.

=== Cabaret and recording ===
She appeared on the 1966 cast recordings of The Mad Show performing Stephen Sondheim's "The Boy From...". From It's a Bird...It's a Plane...It's Superman, one of her numbers, "You've Got Possibilities", was the album's best-received song and was called "The one memorable song...flirty, syncopated" by the Dallas Observer.

Lavin appeared in cabaret and concert performances. In 2005 she appeared at the Empire Plush Room in San Francisco, accompanied by Billy Stritch and her husband, Steve Bakunas. The Talkin' Broadway reviewer summed up her performance: "Linda Lavin is funny, warm and full of personality." In April 2006 she performed at Birdland (New York) "with her critically acclaimed cabaret act The Song Remembers When", with Billy Stritch. She performed with the Wilmington Symphony (Wilmington, North Carolina) in March 2012.

Her recording Possibilities was released by Ghostlight Records in 2012. Steven Suskin wrote: "There is still that sweet, friendly sound of long ago (and 'sweet' and 'friendly' are not words you'd use to describe Lavin-the-actress)."

=== Television ===
In 1967, Lavin made an appearance as Gloria Thorpe in a television version of the baseball musical Damn Yankees with Phil Silvers. In 1969, Lavin married actor Ron Leibman, and by 1973, the couple had moved to Hollywood, California. After various guest appearances on episodic television series such as The Nurses, Rhoda, Harry O, and Kaz, Lavin landed a recurring role as Detective Janice Wentworth on Barney Miller during the first and second seasons (1975–1976).

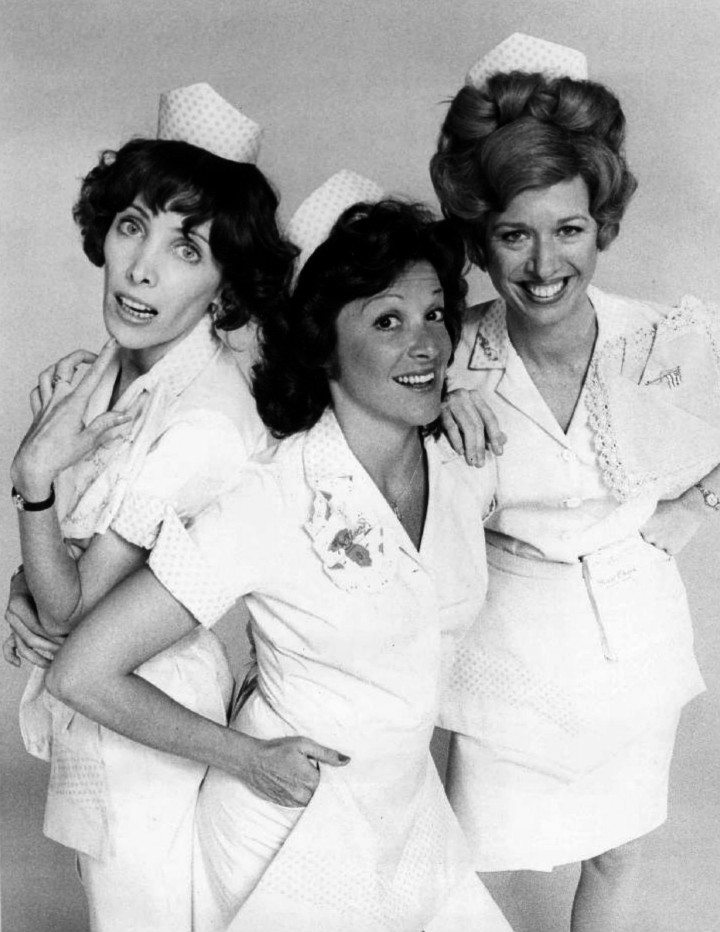
Beth Howland as Vera, Linda Lavin as Alice, and Polly Holliday as Flo on Alice (1976)

She left Barney Miller to star in the lead role in Alice, which was a sitcom success that ran from 1976 to 1985 on the CBS network. The series was based on the Martin Scorsese–directed Ellen Burstyn film Alice Doesn't Live Here Anymore. Lavin portrayed Alice Hyatt, a waitress and aspiring singer, the character that Burstyn had played. Lavin performed the series' theme song, "There's a New Girl in Town," which was written by David Shire and Alan and Marilyn Bergman and was updated for each of the first six seasons. During the series' nine-season run, Lavin won two Golden Globe Awards and received a Primetime Emmy Award nomination, and gained experience directing, especially during the later seasons. Lavin also played a dual role in Alice, as Debbie Walden, the wizened and former landlady of the character Vera Louise Gorman-Novak. Lavin also made numerous television appearances outside of Alice, including hosting her own holiday special for CBS, Linda in Wonderland (1980). She acted in two sitcoms, Room for Two (1992–93) and 1998's Conrad Bloom. In Room for Two, she played a mother who moved in with her daughter, played by Patricia Heaton, who has a show on a local television station. The daughter gives Lavin's character her own segment, called "Just a Thought", at the end of her program.

She made numerous television guest appearances, including roles on The Muppet Show (1979), Law & Order: Criminal Intent, The O.C., Touched by an Angel (1999), and HBO's The Sopranos (2002).

She also appeared in many other telefilms between 1967 and 1998, including: Sadbird, The Morning After, Jerry, Like Mom, Like Me, The $5.20 an Hour Dream, Another Woman's Child, Maricela, Lena: My 100 Children, Whitewash, A Dream is a Wish Your Heart Makes: The Annette Funicello Story, Stolen Memories: Secrets from the Rose Garden, For the Future: The Irvine Fertility Scandal, The Ring, and Best Friends for Life. Lavin produced and starred in A Matter of Life and Death, the 1981 telefilm based on the work of nurse thanatologist Joy Ufema. She directed the 1990 telefilm Flour Babies.

Lavin provided the voice of the Mother Vulture in the animated series Courage the Cowardly Dog for the episode "Watch The Birdies".

After working in theater for many years, Lavin was cast in the NBC television sitcom Sean Saves the World (2013–14) playing Sean Hayes' pushy, meddling mother Lorna. The Los Angeles Times interviewer noted: "A highlight of the show is the wonderful chemistry between Lavin and Hayes, who exchange repartee and quips with breezy ease. And the cast seems smitten with her."

In 2015, she guest starred as a judge approached to stop an execution in the episode of Bones titled "The Verdict in the Victims".

Lavin in 2012 guest starred on 2 episodes of the CBS series "Mom", "Kreplach and a tiny tush" and Mahjong Sally & the Ecstasy" as Violet's Fiancée's Jewish Mother.

Lavin played Judy Roberts in the CBS sitcom 9JKL (2017–18) alongside Mark Feuerstein and Elliott Gould. In 2019, Lavin joined the cast of the Netflix comedy/horror Santa Clarita Diet, starring Drew Barrymore and Timothy Olyphant. In 2020, Lavin performed the song "The Boy From..." from The Mad Show in Take Me to the World: A Sondheim 90th Birthday Celebration. Lavin appeared in the CBS comedy B Positive, which aired from 2020 to 2022, in a recurring role as Norma, one of the senior citizens at a local retirement home.

In June 2024, it was announced that Max Mutchnick and David Kohan had created a The Golden Girls-like TV series set in Palm Springs, with Matt Bomer, Nathan Lee Graham and Nathan Lane as Bunny Schneiderman. Lavin played Lane's mother, Sybil Schneiderman. The series, Mid-Century Modern streams on Hulu. At the time of her death, seven of ten episodes of the series had been filmed, and Lavin's character was subsequently written out of the series in the episode "Here's To You Mrs. Schneiderman."

=== Directing and teaching ===
While residing in Wilmington, North Carolina, Lavin worked as a stage director. One of her directorial credits was a 1998 production of William Shakespeare's As You Like It, updated to a Brazilian jazz style. In both Wilmington and New York City, she taught master classes in acting and singing.

=== Film ===
Lavin made her feature film debut in The Muppets Take Manhattan (1984). Her other feature film appearances include See You in the Morning, starring Jeff Bridges; Alain Resnais's I Want to Go Home, opposite Gérard Depardieu (both 1989); and The Back-up Plan (2010).

== Personal life ==
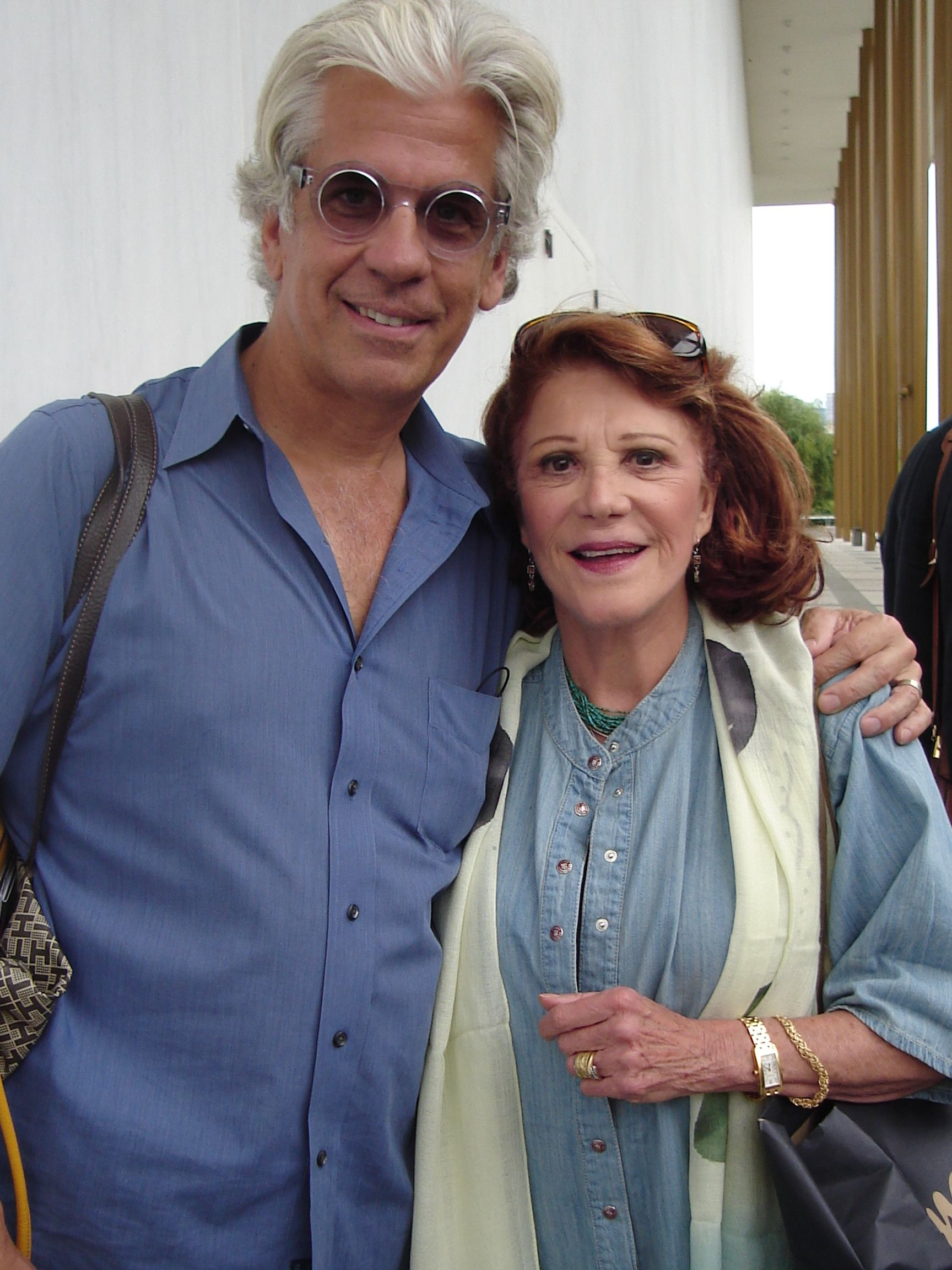
Lavin and her husband Steve Bakunas at the Kennedy Center, 2011

Lavin was married three times. Her first marriage to actor Ron Leibman ended in divorce in 1981. Her second marriage, to actor Kip Niven, whom she met on the set of Alice, ended in a bitter divorce in 1992. While Lavin had no biological children, she was a stepmother during her second and third marriages. She married Steve Bakunas in 2005. The couple resided in Wilmington, North Carolina, where they were committed community members who were working together to rehabilitate impoverished neighborhoods including renovating many homes, donating a park to the city and creating a community theater, the Red Barn Studio. In 1997, Lavin founded The Linda Lavin Arts Foundation in Wilmington, "to promote and foster the advancement of the performing and visual arts, with special emphasis on arts in education. Her foundation has created a theater program called Girl Friends, whose purpose is to raise the self-esteem of at-risk teenage girls of the inner city."

In September 2012, Lavin announced that she intended to sell her home in Wilmington and return to New York City. Lavin and Bakunas thereafter resided in New York City until her death. She continued to work in California as well.

Lavin continued performing after being diagnosed with lung cancer. She died from cardiopulmonary arrest due to complications of the disease in Los Angeles on December 29, 2024, aged 87.

== Acting credits ==
=== Film ===
Year	Title	Role	Notes
1967	Damn Yankees!	Gloria Thorpe	
1974	The Morning After	Toni	
1978	Like Mom, Like Me	Althea Gruen	
1980	The $5.20 an Hour Dream	Ellen Lissick	
1981	A Matter of Life and Death	Nurse Joy Ufema	
1984	The Muppets Take Manhattan	Kermit's Doctor	
1986	Maricela	Mrs. Gannett	
1987	A Place to Call Home	Liz Gavin	
1987	Lena: My 100 Children	Lena Kuchler-Silberman	
1989	See You in the Morning	Aunt Sidney	
1989	I Want to Go Home	Lena Apthrop	
1995	A Dream Is a Wish Your Heart Makes: The Annette Funicello Story	Virginia Funicello	
1996	Stolen Memories: Secrets from the Rose Garden	Earline	
1996	The Ring	Ruth Liebman	
1996	For the Future: The Irvine Fertility Scandal	Marilyn Killane	
1998	Best Friends for Life	Sarah "Coop" Cooper	
2002	Collected Stories	Ruth Steiner	
2010	The Back-up Plan	Nana	
2012	Wanderlust	Shari	
2013	A Short History of Decay	Sandy Fisher	
2015	The Intern	Patty	
2016	Manhattan Night	Norma Segal	
2016	Bakery in Brooklyn	Isabelle	
2017	How to Be a Latin Lover	Millicent Dupont	
2019	Nancy Drew and the Hidden Staircase	Flora	
2021	Naked Singularity	Judge Cymbeline	
2021	Being the Ricardos	Older Madelyn Pugh	
2022	Diary of a Wimpy Kid: Rodrick Rules	Barb (voice)	
2025	One Big Happy Family	Lenore	Posthumous release

=== Television ===
Year	Title	Role	Notes
1974	Rhoda	Linda Monroe	Episode: "The Shower"
1975	Harry O	Alice	Episode: "Group Terror"
1975–1976	Barney Miller	Det. Janice Wentworth	Recurring role, 5 episodes
1976	Phyllis	Margaret Gates	Episode: "Widows, Merry and Otherwise"
1976–1985	Alice	Alice Hyatt	Main role, 202 episodes
1977	Family	Annie Laurie	Episode: "Annie Laurie"
1978	The Hanna-Barbera Happy Hour	Herself	Episode #1.3
1979	Kaz	Helen 'Frenchy' Russo	Episode: "A Fool for a Client"
1979	The Mary Tyler Moore Hour	Herself	Episode #1.9
1979	The Muppet Show	Herself	Episode: "Linda Lavin"
1980	Linda in Wonderland	Hostess, herself	Musical variety television special
1982	Lily for President?	Alice Hyatt	TV special
1983	Another Woman's Child	Terry DeBray	
1992–1993	Room for Two	Edie Kurland	Main role, 26 episodes
1994	Whitewash	Mrs. Steunberg (voice)	TV special
1998	Conrad Bloom	Florie Bloom	Main role, 13 episodes
1999	Touched by an Angel	Amanda Randolph	Episode: "Jagged Edges"
2002	The Sopranos	Dr. Wendi Kobler	Episode: "No Show"
2002	Courage the Cowardly Dog	Mama Bird (voice)	Episode: "Watch the Birdies"
2002	Law & Order: Criminal Intent	Ursula Sussman	Episode: "Shandeh"
2004–2005	The O.C.	Sophie Cohen	3 episodes
2013, 2023	Bob's Burgers	Helen / Gertie (voice)	Episodes: "It Snakes a Village", "Radio No You Didn't"
2013–2014	Sean Saves the World	Lorna Harrison	Main role, 15 episodes
2014–2015	The Good Wife	Joy Grubick	3 episodes
2015	Bones	Judge Michael	Episode: "The Verdict in the Victims"
2016	Mom	Phyllis	2 episodes
2017–2018	9JKL	Judy Roberts	Main role, 16 episodes
2018	Madam Secretary	June O'Callaghan	Episode: "E Pluribus Unum"
2019	Santa Clarita Diet	Jean	Recurring role, 4 episodes
2019	Brockmire	Lorraine	Episode: "Banned for Life"
2020	Yvette Slosch, Agent	Yvette Slosch	Main role, 13 episodes
2020	Room 104	Enid	Episode: "No Dice"
2020–2022	B Positive	Norma Goldman	Recurring and main role, 32 episodes
2024	Elsbeth	Gloria Blecher	Episode: "A Classic New York Character"
2024	No Good Deed	Phyllis Adelman	3 episodes
2025	Mid-Century Modern	Sybil Schneiderman	Main role, 8 episodes (posthumous release)
2025	Criminal Minds: Evolution	Connie LaMontagne	Episode: "Time to Say Goodbye" (posthumous release)

=== Theater ===
Year	Title	Role
1962	A Family Affair	Various
1963	The Riot Act	Barbara
1964–1965	Wet Paint	Performer
1966	It's a Bird...It's a Plane...It's Superman	Sydney
1966	The Mad Show	Performer
1967	On a Clear Day You Can See Forever	Daisy Gamble, Melinda Welles
1967	Something Different	Beth Nemerov
1967	Little Murders	Patsy Newquist
1969	Cop-Out	Performer
1969–1970	Last of the Red Hot Lovers	Elaine Navazio
1970	Paul Sills' Story Theater	Various
1973	The Enemy is Dead	Leah
1974	Rich and Famous	Performer
1986–1987	Broadway Bound	Kate
1990	Gypsy	Rose Thompson Hovick
1993	The Sisters Rosensweig	Gorgeous Teitelbaum
1995	Death Defying Acts	Dorothy/Carol
1996	Cakewalk	Lillian Hellman
1998	The Diary of Anne Frank	Mrs. Van Daan
2000–2001	The Tale of the Allergist's Wife	Marjorie
2002	Hollywood Arms	Nanny
2004	Finishing the Picture	Flora Fassinger
2008	The New Century	Helene Nadler
2010	Collected Stories	Ruth Steiner
2010-2011	Other Desert Cities	Silda Grauman
2011	Follies	Hattie Walker
2011–2012	The Lyons	Rita Lyons
2014	Too Much Sun	Audrey Langham
2016	Our Mother's Brief Affair	Anna
2017	Candide	Old Lady
2022	You Will Get Sick	#2

== Awards and nominations ==
Year	Award	Category	Nominated work	Result	Ref.
2010	American Theater Hall of Fame		—N/a	Inducted	
2015	Critics' Choice Television Awards	Best Guest Performer in a Drama Series	The Good Wife	Nominated	
1990	Daytime Emmy Awards	Outstanding Children's Special	CBS Schoolbreak Special (for "Flour Babies")	Nominated	
1969	Drama Desk Awards	Outstanding Performance	Little Murders	Won	
1987	Drama Desk Awards	Outstanding Actress in a Play	Broadway Bound	Won	
1995	Drama Desk Awards	Outstanding Actress in a Play	Death Defying Acts	Nominated	
1998	Drama Desk Awards	Outstanding Featured Actress in a Play	The Diary of Anne Frank	Nominated	
2000	Drama Desk Awards	Outstanding Actress in a Play	The Tale of the Allergist's Wife	Nominated	
2008	Drama Desk Awards	Outstanding Featured Actress in a Play	The New Century	Won	
2011	Drama Desk Awards	Outstanding Featured Actress in a Play	Other Desert Cities	Nominated	
2012	Drama Desk Awards	Outstanding Actress in a Play	The Lyons	Nominated	
1978	Golden Globe Awards	Best Actress in a Television Series – Musical or Comedy	Alice	Won	
1979	Golden Globe Awards	Best Actress in a Television Series – Musical or Comedy	Alice	Won	
1980	Golden Globe Awards	Best Actress in a Television Series – Musical or Comedy	Alice	Nominated	
1995	Obie Awards	Distinguished Performance by an Actress	Death Defying Acts	Won	
2012	Obie Awards	Distinguished Performance by an Actress	The Lyons	Won	
1979	Primetime Emmy Awards	Outstanding Lead Actress in a Comedy Series	Alice	Nominated	
1965	Theatre World Awards	Distinguished Performer	Wet Paint	Won	
1970	Tony Awards	Best Featured Actress in a Play	Last of the Red Hot Lovers	Nominated	
1987	Tony Awards	Best Leading Actress in a Play	Broadway Bound	Won	
1998	Tony Awards	Best Featured Actress in a Play	The Diary of Anne Frank	Nominated	
2001	Tony Awards	Best Leading Actress in a Play	The Tale of the Allergist's Wife	Nominated	
2010	Tony Awards	Best Leading Actress in a Play	Collected Stories	Nominated	
2012	Tony Awards	Best Leading Actress in a Play	The Lyons	Nominated	
2007	TV Land Awards	Favorite Working Mom	Alice	Won	
