= Joy Ufema =

American nurse

- Born: Joy K. Counsel; 1942 (age 82–83); Altoona, Pennsylvania
- Other names: Joy (Ufema) Counsel
- Citizenship: United States
- Education: B.S. and M.S., Columbia Pacific University
- Occupation: Nurse
- Known for: First nurse-thanatologist in U.S.
- Notable work: Brief Companions; Insights on Death & Dying
- Board member of: Pennsylvania Hospice Network Executive Committee
- Partner: Linda Lighty

Joy Ufema, also known as Joy Counsel (born 1942), is a retired American nurse and thanatologist. She is noted for her work with terminally ill people in the U.S. state of Pennsylvania, and was the first nurse-thanatologist in the country. Ufema garnered national attention after 60 Minutes aired a segment about her. Ufema was Clinical Specialist in Thanatology for Upper Chesapeake Medical Center/Harford Memorial Hospital. Linda Lavin Played the role of Ufema in a 1981 television film, A Matter of Life and Death.

== Early life and education ==
Her mother was Cecelia Counsel (1916–1984) from Eldorado, Pennsylvania, and her father Ernest Victor Counsel (1917–1965) was a machinist for the Pennsylvania Railroad in Altoona. After leaving high school, Ufema failed her training as a nurse at Altoona Hospital School of Nursing in 1961. Following a stint working at Warren State Hospital as a psychiatric aide, she returned to Harrisburg to complete her nurse's training at Harrisburg Community College. Ufema earned both B.S. and M.S. degrees at Columbia Pacific University.

== Career ==
Ufema's interest in helping dying patients began when she was working as a urology nurse in 1972. She persuaded the hospital to allow her to tend to terminal patients after hearing a speech by psychiatrist Elisabeth Kübler-Ross. Ufema cited Kübler-Ross' book On Death and Dying as an influence. In her job, she granted several last wishes to her patients, which prompted complaints from her fellow nurses that she had been given too much autonomy.

She garnered national attention after a 14-minute segment about her was aired on the CBS television program 60 Minutes in January 1977. As a result, Ufema received more referrals from physicians. The segment impressed actress Linda Lavin, who made a telephone call to Ufema to talk to her about producing a film about her life. However, the extra publicity Ufema received meant there were conflicts between her and the hospital administration, and she resigned her post in 1978. The film about Ufema, A Matter of Life and Death, was broadcast on television on CBS on January 13, 1981.

One of Ufema's early publications was an article called "What to Say to Members After a Family Death". Ufema has also authored articles for American Journal of Hospice Care. She has served as guest lecturer and consultant for several schools and medical facilities. In 1984, she wrote Brief Companions, describing her work as a nurse thanatologist at Harrisburg Hospital. She was featured in a 1991 video, Dealing with Death and Dying. In 2007, she published Insights on Death & Dying, a collection of her columns since 1987 for a nursing journal. She has held memberships in the Institute of Society, Ethics, and the Life Sciences, the Forum of Death Education and Counseling, and the Pennsylvania Hospice Network Executive Committee.

Ufema founded a private death-counseling practice in Harrisburg which closed after one year of operation because of financial difficulty. She opened the counseling center, Hospice of Lancaster County, in March 1980. She interviewed patients and established a team of medical and other personnel who oversaw volunteers and directed support groups for the patients' families. Ufema's work nationally took time away from her work in Lancaster, and she was asked to resign her position in October 1982. She acquired the York House Hospice for terminally ill patients with AIDS in June 1991 which began operating six months later. Following a recommendation made by Ufema, the hospice was closed on November 22, 1996, after it suffered from financial difficulties. She worked for Upper Chesapeake Medical Center/Harford Memorial Hospital as their Clinical Specialist in Thanatology before her retirement.

Many medical volunteers have stated Ufema influenced them to work in the sector. Ufema asked her patients what it was like to be seriously ill and encouraged them to take control over the remainder of their lives. She was the first nurse-thanatologist in the United States.

== Honors ==
Ufema was honored with the Distinguished Pennsylvanian award in 1980, and was named as a Distinguished Alumni Award winner by the Altoona Area School District Foundation in 2004.

== See also ==
- Hospice care in the United States
