= Dorothy Rodgers =

American writer, inventor, businesswoman, and philanthropist (1909–1992)

Dorothy Rodgers (née Feiner; 1909–1992) was an American writer, inventor, businesswoman, and philanthropist. She was married to the Broadway composer Richard Rodgers, of the famous duo Rodgers and Hammerstein.

== Life ==
Born in New York City to a Jewish family, Rodgers attended the Horace Mann School and Wellesley College in the late 1920s, where she studied art and interior design. She married Richard Rodgers in 1930.

She started her own business, Repairs Inc. in 1935 before she invented the Jonny Mop in 1945. Rodgers was also the creator of the Basically Yours dress pattern and the Ideal Toy Company's Turn and Learn storybooks.

She is the author of several books focusing on interior design and entertaining at home such as 1967's The House in My Head. In 1970, Rodgers also co-wrote a self-help book with her daughter Mary Rodgers Guettel about mother-daughter relationships and housekeeping called A Word to the Wives. This spawned a related radio show and a regular magazine column for McCall's Magazine, "Of Two Minds."

Rodgers was also known as an activist, writing letters against antisemitism. She likewise was a noted philanthropist who supported several Jewish cultural organizations.

Dorothy Rodgers was portrayed by Janet Leigh in the 1948 Metro-Goldwyn-Mayer film Words and Music, a semi-fictionalized depiction of the partnership of Richard Rodgers and Lorenz Hart.

== Death ==
Rodgers died in her Manhattan home at the age of 83 in August 1992. She was survived by her two daughters, Mary and Linda.
