= The Elephant Man (1982 film) =

- Genre: Biography; Drama
- Written by: Steve Lawson; Bernard Pomerance (play)
- Directed by: Jack Hofsiss
- Starring: Philip Anglim; Kevin Conway
- Country of origin: United States
- Original language: English

Production
- Executive producer: Martin Starger
- Producer: Richmond Crinkley
- Editors: Max K. Curtis; Gary Princz
- Running time: 90 minutes
- Production company: Marble Arch Productions

Original release
- Network: ABC
- Release: January 4, 1982

The Elephant Man is a 1982 American biographical television film directed by Jack Hofsiss loosely based on the 19th-century Englishman Joseph Merrick (known in this film as John Merrick). The script was adapted by Steve Lawson from the 1977 play of the same name by Bernard Pomerance. It was first broadcast by the American Broadcasting Company (ABC) on January 4, 1982.

Playwright Pomerance's Broadway debut of The Elephant Man in 1977 was directed by Hofsiss, who became the youngest ever winner of a Tony Award for directing the play. In the film, Philip Anglim and Kevin Conway reprised their roles from the play as John Merrick and Frederick Treves, respectively.

The film received four Emmy Award nominations in 1982; Penny Fuller won the award for 'Outstanding Supporting Actress in a Limited Series or a Special'. At the 40th Golden Globe Awards, Philip Anglim was nominated for the Golden Globe Award for Best Actor – Miniseries or Television Film. Jack Hofsiss was nominated for a Directors Guild of America Award for 'Outstanding Directorial Achievement in Dramatic Specials'.

== Cast ==
- Philip Anglim as John Merrick
- Kevin Conway as Frederick Treves
- Penny Fuller as Mrs. Kendal
- Glenn Close as Princess Alexandra
