= Beautiful Child (play) =

Beautiful Child is a drama by American playwright Nicky Silver. It premiered Off-Broadway in 2004.

== Production ==
Beautiful Child premiered at the Vineyard Theatre in New York on February 24, 2004 (previews from February 6) and ran to March 28. Directed by Terry Kinney the cast featured George Grizzard, Alexandra Gersten-Vassilaros, and Penny Fuller.

== Plot ==
Harry and Nan, a middle-aged couple, are constantly at odds. Harry is having an affair with his emotionally unstable secretary. "Your secretary, Harry?" snipes Nan. "You're past cliché and into archetype." This tone of acid comedy is replaced, however, by deep anguish, when their adult son, Isaac, announces that he has fallen in love with a child. He wants to return home and live with his parents, who have to struggle between their love for him and their guilt and horror at his transgression. They finally come to a compromise, which is almost as shocking as Isaac's offense: he can live with them, but must be blinded first, to keep him from ever being attracted to another boy.

== Critical response ==
Reviews were mixed. Most reviewers were struck by its similarity to Edward Albee's recent international success, The Goat, or Who is Sylvia?, and indeed, The Goat and Beautiful Child are similar in their explorations of sexual transgression in affluent domestic settings, as well as their edgy amalgams of comedy and horror. Some critics, like Adrienne Onofri, dismissed Silver's play as a poor imitation of Albee Others, like Simon Stoltzman, acknowledged the similarity to Albee's work, but found Silver's approach distinctive.

Penny Fuller and George Grizzard were widely praised for their performances. Reviewer Dan Bacalzo observed, "Grizzard has the uncanny ability to convey volumes with a murmured word or dismissive gesture."

Ben Brantley in his New York Times review called the play a "grim comic drama", and wrote: "Swerving from the brittle, accusatory dialogue of a bitterly married couple to a scene of ritualistic sacrifice à la Sophocles, Mr. Silver has composed an ambitious but ungainly answer to Edward Albee's plays of domestic existentialism, works like 'A Delicate Balance' and 'All Over.' Ultimately 'Beautiful Child' isn't much more than ersatz Albee."
