= Oh, Kay! =

- 1955 Studio Cast Recording
- Music: George Gershwin
- Lyrics: Ira Gershwin
- Book: Guy Bolton; P. G. Wodehouse
- Basis: play La Presidente
- Productions: 1926 Broadway; 1927 West End; 1928 Broadway revival 1928 Film; 1960 off-Broadway revival 1990 Broadway revival

Oh, Kay! is a musical with music by George Gershwin, lyrics by Ira Gershwin, and a book by Guy Bolton and P. G. Wodehouse. It is based on the play La Présidente by Maurice Hennequin and Pierre Veber. The plot revolves around the adventures of the Duke of Durham and his sister, Lady Kay, English bootleggers in Prohibition Era America. Kay finds herself falling in love with a man who seems unavailable. The show is remembered for its enduring song, "Someone to Watch Over Me".

The musical opened on Broadway in 1926, starring Gertrude Lawrence and Victor Moore, and ran for 256 performances. The musical then opened in London's West End in 1927, starring Lawrence and John Kirby, where it ran for 213 performances.

== Background ==
Producers Alex A. Aarons and Vinton Freedley imagined Oh, Kay! as a Princess Theatre-style show, with a contemporary setting, simple sets, and a farcical story. Gertrude Lawrence, who had been featured in the André Charlot revues of 1924 and 1925, was chosen as the star before the songs or story had been written. In accordance with the typical creative process for early American musicals, George and Ira Gershwin wrote the score to Oh, Kay! before the librettists, Bolton and Wodehouse, began work on the book. When the book was completed, eight songs from the Gershwins' score were cut because they could not be easily inserted into the libretto. The show's Philadelphia previews ran more than three hours, and so the producers cut the prologue (where the leading lady was introduced), thus losing the first 4 songs, and also the Act II "Finaletto", which became obsolete in the reshuffling. This highlighted the farcical elements of the plot at the expense of the romantic ones, since the title character does not appear until 40 minutes into the show.

The story aptly captured the spirit of the Roaring Twenties, featuring settings and characters familiar to theatre audiences: an opulent Long Island mansion and notorious (but comic) bootleggers. During rehearsals, George Gershwin purchased a rag doll in a Philadelphia toy store. The ballad, "Someone to Watch Over Me", was staged with Lawrence alone on stage, clutching the doll and singing to it. It was the hit song of the show and became a Gershwin standard.

== Synopsis ==
=== Act I ===
It is 1926, the Jazz Age and the era of Prohibition. Jimmy Winter is very popular among the young ladies, and they are cleaning the living room of his Long Island, New York, estate, declaring that "The Woman's Touch" is exactly what his home needs. Jimmy has been away but is coming home that evening. In his absence, some English bootleggers, the Duke of Durham, his sister, Lady Kay, and their thick-headed American assistants, "Shorty" McGee and Larry Potter, have stashed their illegal booze in Jimmy's house. When they hear that Jimmy is returning, the Duke cancels that night's rum run and plans to remove their hundreds of cases of liquor from the cellar. Dolly and Phyllis Ruxton, two of the young ladies, happen to be identical twins. They join Larry in an extemporaneous song and dance ("Don't Ask").

Revenue Officer Jansen arrives, convinced that a crime is in progress, but departs when Jimmy returns home. Jimmy is accompanied by his serious and overbearing second wife, Constance, to whom he has just been married. His first marriage followed a drunken college prank, and the couple has now been separated for many years. He applied for an annulment so he could marry Constance. Shorty passes himself off as the new butler, having sent away the butler and maid that Jimmy had ordered. As butler, Shorty can make sure the rum in the basement is safe.

Jimmy receives a telegram from his lawyer saying that the annulment has not been completed, so Jimmy and Constance are illegally married. Constance furiously leaves for the nearest inn. Jimmy tells Shorty about a beautiful girl who saved him from drowning last summer. He is interrupted when the young ladies who cleaned his house return to welcome him home. He declares that each is a "Dear Little Girl". They leave, and Jimmy prepares for bed as a storm rages outside. Lady Kay, clad in oilskin and clutching a revolver, enters pursued by revenue officers. She turns out to be the girl who rescued Jimmy the previous summer. Jimmy hides her in his bedroom when Officer Jansen arrives at the house to question Jimmy. Jansen leaves but then returns and sees Kay and Jimmy together. Kay says she is Jimmy's wife, and since the just-married suitcases are still scattered around the living room, the revenue officer believes her and leaves. Kay cannot go out in the terrible storm, so she will have to stay the night in Jimmy's room ("Maybe").

The Duke and Larry arrive at Jimmy's house the next morning searching frantically for Kay. The pretty girls also drop in, and Larry leads a minstrel-style song and dance ("Clap Yo' Hands") to cheer up the Duke. Kay hides in Jimmy's bedroom until all the guests leave. The revenue officer returns, and Jimmy and Kay pretend to be newlyweds ("Do, Do, Do"). The Duke, Constance and Constance's father, Judge Appleton, all show up, and Kay hides in the bedroom again. Now that Jimmy's annulment is final, the Judge plans to preside over an official marriage ceremony that afternoon. Constance hears noises from the bedroom and opens the door. Kay, now dressed as an English maid, introduces herself as Jane, wife of Shorty the butler. Kay realizes she is in love with Jimmy and resolves to prevent his marriage to Constance.

=== Act II ===
Wedding photographs of the "Bride and Groom" are being taken, and Kay, still disguised as a maid, tries to convince Jimmy that she would be a better wife than fussy Constance. She tells her rag doll that she needs "Someone to Watch Over Me". Larry is supposed to be ferrying the booze out of the cellar, but he ends up demonstrating the dancing ability of his "Fidgety Feet" instead. The revenue officer shows up briefly and is confused when Kay is introduced as Shorty's wife, not Jimmy's wife. The Judge and Constance demand lunch, and Shorty and Kay must serve them. The meal becomes increasingly chaotic, and the Judge and Constance are severely offended and leave. Jimmy declares that spending time with the lovely ladies who frequent his house is "Heaven on Earth".

The revenue officer returns and is shocked to hear that Jimmy is getting married that afternoon, since he saw him with his wife the previous night. Kay is trying on one of Constance's gowns, and, since she does not look like a maid anymore, she and Shorty convince the revenue officer that she is Jimmy's wife. She just looks like Jane the maid; Dolly and Phyllis demonstrate that two people can look alike.

Kay and Shorty plot to stop the wedding. When Jimmy sees Kay in Constance's dress, she is so beautiful that he kisses her. The wedding begins, and as the Judge reads the service, he is interrupted by Shorty, disguised as a revenue agent, who is executing Kay's plan. He says that Jimmy is under arrest for hiding alcohol in his house. The real revenue officer arrives, arrests the Duke and Kay, and charges Jimmy with harboring a criminal. He reveals that he found Kay in Jimmy's pajamas the night before masquerading as Jimmy's wife. The bootleggers and Jimmy are placed under arrest and locked in the cellar as the booze is trucked away. They soon discover, however, that the basement has been left unlocked, and they can leave.

That night, Jimmy gives a party for his friends and the bootleggers. His friends all praise Kay, declaring "Oh, Kay, You're OK with Me". The revenue officer arrives and confesses that he is really the Blackbird, a famous pirate, and he has just stolen all their liquor! But it turns out that the truck drivers were working for Shorty and Larry. Blackbird swears that he will have his revenge. Since he thinks Kay does not have a United States visa, he wants her deported. However, Jimmy arrives with their new marriage license, proving that Kay is a U.S. citizen.

== Productions and recordings ==
Oh, Kay! premiered on November 8, 1926, at the Imperial Theatre on Broadway, starring Gertrude Lawrence and Victor Moore, and ran for 256 performances. In London, it played at His Majesty's Theatre, opening on September 21, 1927, and ran for 213 performances, starring Lawrence and John Kirby. The musical was revived at the Century Theatre in 1928.

In 1955 Barbara Ruick, Jack Cassidy and Allen Case headlined the first LP studio cast album which was released by Columbia Records, conducted by Lehman Engel.

An off-Broadway production in 1960 at the East 74th Street Theater starred Linda Lavin, Penny Fuller and David Daniels, with Eddie Phillips, Bernie West, Murray Matheson and Marti Stevens; high school student Daniel Lewis worked a follow spot. The revival, with interpolated songs and new lyrics by Wodehouse, was recorded in 1960. The premiere and 1960 revival used a two-piano team for the pit orchestra, occasionally augmented by a percussionist, as intended by the composer. Later productions used a typical Broadway pit orchestra.

A 1990 revival by David Merrick played at the Richard Rodgers Theatre and the Lunt-Fontanne Theatre with an all-black cast, including Brian Stokes Mitchell. In 1997 a Discovering Lost Musicals concert version played at the Barbican Centre in London, using the original script (with Louise Gold in the title role). There have been other British productions, including a 1984 production at Chichester, directed by Ian Judge and starring Jane Carr as Kay and Michael Siberry as Jimmy. Jane How, Edward Hibbert and Gareth Valentine were also featured. Ohio Light Opera produced "Oh, Kay!" in 2015, directed by Ted Christopher.

The musical was made into a silent film of the same name in 1928 A recording of the musical made in 1995, with Dawn Upshaw, restored the songs The Moon Is On the Sea, When Our Ship Comes Sailing In and Ain't It Romantic, cut from the original production, and returned Someone to Watch Over Me to its original position, early in Act I.

== Roles and original Broadway cast ==
- Kay – Gertrude Lawrence
- "Shorty" McGee – Victor Moore
- Jimmy Winter – Oscar Shaw
- Constance Appleton – Sascha Beaumont
- Mae – Constance Carpenter
- Molly Morse – Betty Compton
- Larry Potter – Harland Dixon
- Dolly Ruxton – Madeleine Fairbanks
- Phil Ruxton – Marion Fairbanks
- Judge Appleton – Frank Gardiner
- Peggy – Janette Gilmore
- Revenue Officer Jansen – Harry T. Shannon
- The Duke – Gerald Oliver Smith
- Daisy – Paulette Winston

== Songs ==
Act I

- The Woman's Touch – Molly Morse, Mae and Ensemble
- Don't Ask – Larry Potter, Phyllis Ruxton and Dolly Ruxton
- Dear Little Girl – Jimmy Winter and Girls
- Maybe – Jimmy and Kay
- Clap Yo' Hands – Larry, Molly, Daisy, Mae, Peggy and Ensemble
- Do, Do, Do – Jimmy and Kay

Act II

- Bride and Groom – Constance Appleton, Jimmy, Judge Appleton and Guests
- Someone to Watch Over Me – Kay
- Fidgety Feet – Larry, Phyllis and Ensemble
- Heaven on Earth – Jimmy, Molly, Mae and Ensemble
- Oh, Kay! – Kay and Boys
