= Baby Snatcher =

- Genre: Drama
- Written by: Scott Dawson
- Directed by: Joyce Chopra
- Starring: Veronica Hamel; Nancy McKeon; Michael Madsen; David Duchovny; Penny Fuller
- Theme music composer: Paul Chihara
- Country of origin: United States
- Original language: English

Production
- Executive producers: Jennifer Alward; Veronica Hamel
- Producers: Carol Dunn Trussell; Celeste Fremon
- Cinematography: James Glennon
- Running time: 93 minutes
- Production companies: Hearst Entertainment Productions; Morgan Hill Films

Original release
- Network: CBS
- Release: May 3, 1992

Baby Snatcher is a 1992 American made-for-television drama film directed by Joyce Chopra, starring Veronica Hamel and Nancy McKeon. It tells the true story of the abduction of Rachael Ann White from her grandmother's home on February 19, 1988, in Colorado Springs, Colorado, and her recovery four days later.

The film premiered in the United States on May 3, 1992, in the Netherlands on September 28, 1994, and in the United Kingdom on March 16, 1995.

== Plot ==
Karen Williams (Nancy McKeon) has to return to work at the end of her maternity leave. Her mother, Ruth (Penny Fuller), is looking after the baby for her. Ruth is also interviewing people to find a babysitter for all of Karen's children, including Rachael Ann White, a daughter by a married man, David Anderson (David Duchovny), who used to be Karen's boss.

Another couple, Bianca Hudson (Veronica Hamel) and her husband Cal Hudson (Michael Madsen), are experiencing marital problems. He informs her that he has filed for divorce. Bianca tells her husband she's pregnant as he leaves the house. However, she has to undergo an abortion a few months into the pregnancy due to medical reasons. Bianca fakes the pregnancy, and when it is time for the imaginary baby to be born, she goes out to look for a baby to steal.

Disguised, Bianca shows up for an interview for the position of babysitter for Karen's children. When Karen's mother, Ruth, steps into another room, Bianca walks out with the baby. Bianca takes the child home and tells her husband that she went into labor, went to a local hospital, had the baby, and returned home, all in one day.

Karen decides that the best way to find her daughter is to appeal to the media and put out flyers. Cal's boss and wife make a surprise visit to the Hudson home, where they plainly see that the baby is much older than four days, and they alert the authorities. Police arrive, arrest Bianca and Cal, and return the baby to its rightful home.

== Cast ==
- Veronica Hamel as Bianca Hudson
- Nancy McKeon as Karen Williams
- Michael Madsen as Cal Hudson
- David Duchovny as David Anderson
- Penny Fuller as Ruth Benson

== Ratings ==
When the movie first aired May 3, 1992, on CBS from 9:00 until 10:30 pm, the movie followed 60 minutes and Murder, She Wrote, receiving a 16.3 rating and a 26 share. This beat ABC, FOX, and NBC for the time-slot.
