= Paul Harris (actor) =

American actor (1917–1985)

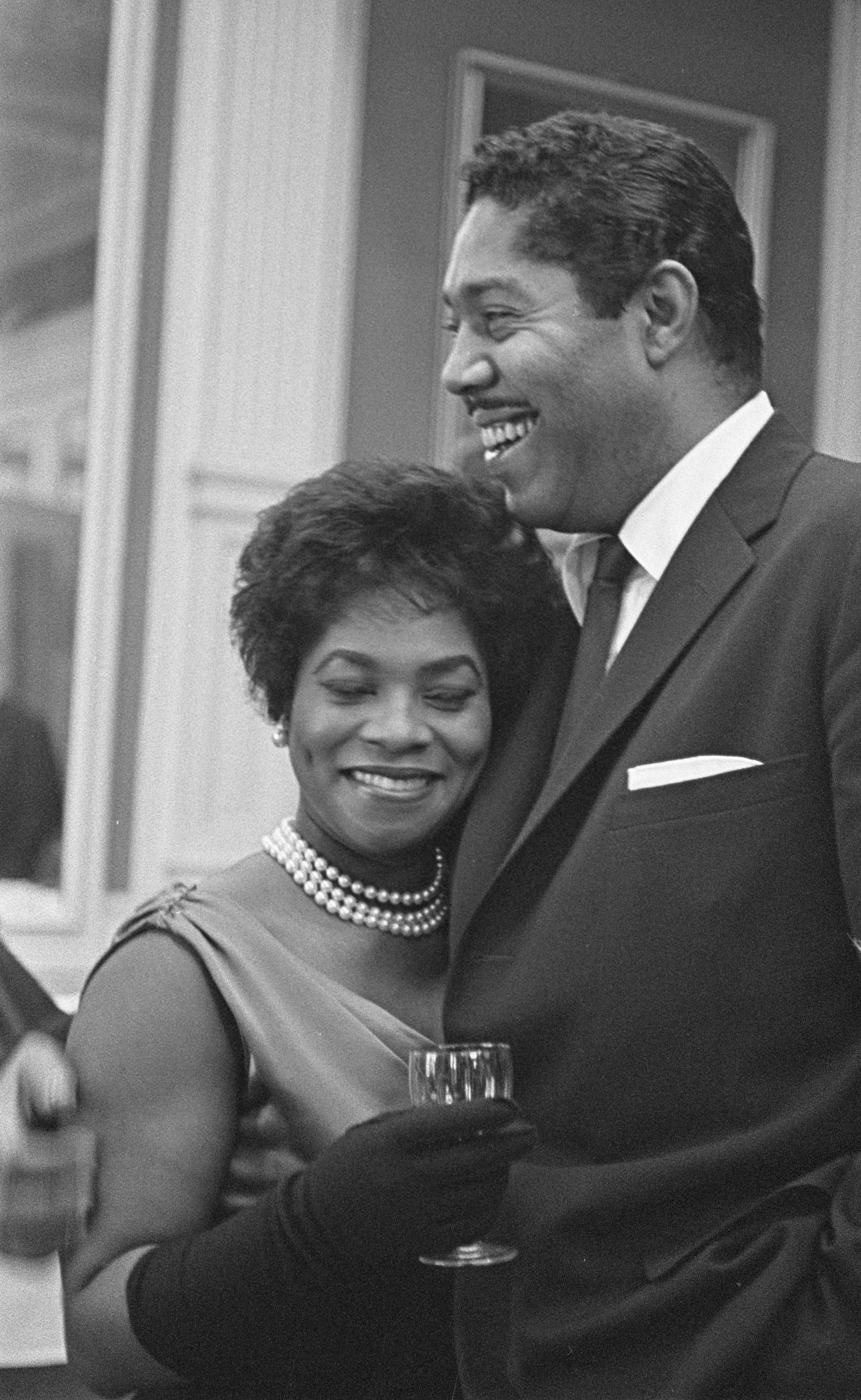
- Paul Harris and Martha Flower (1959)
- Born: Paul Elwood Harris; September 15, 1917; Los Angeles County, California, U.S.
- Died: August 25, 1985 (aged 67); Los Angeles County, California, U.S.
- Other name: Paul E. Harris
- Occupations: Actor, singer, composer
- Years active: 1950s - 1980s

Paul Harris (September 15, 1917 – August 25, 1985) was an American actor. He had roles in films such as All Night Long, Across 110th Street, The Slams, and Truck Turner.

== Background ==
Harris was born and raised in Pasadena, California. At the age of sixteen, he became interested in entertainment and the theatrical world. He decided to study professionally at the Hebert Wall School of Music and The Actors Laboratory, both in Hollywood. He was chosen to study and appear in plays at the Pasadena Community Playhouse.

He became one of the first known black actors and singers, appearing with such renowned organizations as the “George Garner Community Sing Association”, “The DePaur Infantry Chorus”, which took him to New York where he studied at the American Theatre Wing. Harris traveled the U.S. with the touring company of the Broadway hit Show Boat for over a year. He also traveled the world with George Gershwin's company of Porgy & Bess which was supported by the United States and sponsored by the State Department. This exposure propelled him to become involved in theatrical enterprises in such European countries as England, Italy, France, and Germany.

Harris at one time was engaged to Danish model Maud Berthelsen, who later became an actress.

Harris died of cancer in Los Angeles, California, on 25 August 1985.

== Career ==
=== Stage ===
Harris was a singer, stage, film and television actor. He had appeared on Broadway and had been part of international theater tours. In 1949, he played the part of the doorman in the musical comedy Show Boat which was playing at Los Angeles's Greek Theater. The following month he was in the musical Annie, Get Your Gun as Major Domo.

=== Film and television ===
In the late 1950s, looking for work, he left the United States for Europe. He came to Paris with the cast of Free and Easy. In England he secured a starring role in the 1962 film All Night Long. In it he played piano player Aurelius Rex, an Othello-like character plotted against by his devious and sinister drummer Johnny Cousin, played by Patrick McGoohan. He is almost driven into an act of violence against his partner, singer Delia, played by Marti Stevens. In 1966, he had a part in an episode of The Baron which starred Steve Forrest, episode: There's Someone Close Behind You as Wayne. In 1974, he had a role in the film Truck Turner that starred Isaac Hayes. He played the part of a mean and ruthless pimp, Gator Johnson. In 1974, Harris got a leading role as Pasha in the low-budget film Jive Turkey aka Baby Needs a New Pair of Shoes. The film also starred Frank deKova.

== Stage and musical appearances ==
Plays and musicals
Title	Role #	Director	Venue	Year	Notes #
Show Boat	Doorman	Edward Reveaux	Greek Theater, Los Angeles	1949	Opened July 4
Annie, Get Your Gun	Major Domo	Edward Reveaux	Greek Theater, Los Angeles	1949	Opened July 4
Blues Opera / Free And Easy		Robert Breen	Carré Theater, Amsterdam	1959	Produced at the Carré Theater, Amsterdam, December 17, 1959, to its close at the Alhambra, Paris, January 15, 1960

== Filmography ==
Film
Title	Role	Director	Year	Notes #
All Night Long	Aurelius Rex	Basil Dearden	1962	Central role
For Love of Ivy	Dealer	Daniel Mann	1968	
Star!	Soldier	Robert Wise	1968	Uncredited
Across 110th Street	Mr. C	Barry Shear	1972	
The Mack	Blind Man	Michael Campus	1973	
The Slams	Jackson Barney	Jonathan Kaplan	1973	as Paul E. Harris
Truck Turner	Richard Leroy 'Gator' Johnson	Jonathan Kaplan	1974	
Uptown Saturday Night	Police officer	Sidney Poitier	1974	Uncredited
Baby Needs a New Pair of Shoes	Pasha	Bill Brame	1974	Main starring role. Film aka Jive Turkey
Let's Do It Again	Jody Tipps	Sidney Poitier	1975	as Paul E. Harris
Donny's House		Michael Albanese	1987	TV movie, (final film role)

Television
Title	Episode #	Role	Director	Year	Notes #
The Baron	There's Someone Close Behind You	Wayne	Roy Ward Baker	1966	Season 1, Episode 14
The Silent Force	In by Nine, Out by Five	Saul		1970	Season 1, Episode 9
Sanford and Son	Fred, the Reluctant Fingerman	Daniel Tracy	Jack Shea	1973	Season 3, Episode 3. Uncredited role
Sanford and Son	The Oddfather	Daniel Tracy	James Sheldon	1976	Season 5, Episode 13
Sanford	Freeway	Corban Hills Man #1	Jim Drake	1981	
