= The Boy From... =

Song by Linda Lavin
- Released: 1966
- Genre: Bossa nova; Parody; Musical
- Songwriters: Stephen Sondheim; Mary Rodgers

"The Boy From..." is a song with lyrics by Stephen Sondheim and music by Mary Rodgers, originally performed by Linda Lavin in the 1966 Off-Broadway revue The Mad Show.

== Synopsis ==
The song is essentially a parody of "The Girl from Ipanema" and bossa nova style in general. The melody and lyrics are relatively close to the original, and Lavin's original delivery of the song was reminiscent of Astrud Gilberto's simple, breathy style.

The song's context differs from the original in that it is sung in reference to a male character. Though both songs are about unrequited desire for the title character, the humor of "The Boy From..." stems partly from the fact that the narrator is completely oblivious to her would-be crush's blatant homosexuality, as, for example, illustrated in the song's second bridge: "Why are his trousers vermilion? / Why does he claim he's Castilian? / Why do his friends call him Lillian? / And I hear at the end of the week, / he's leaving to start a boutique."

The other humorous aspect of the song comes from the fact that every verse ends with a repetition of the extremely long name of the title character's hometown (hence the title), a fictional village called "Tacarembo la Tumba del Fuego Santa Malipas Zacatecas la Junta del Sol y Cruz" ("Cruz" pronounced as "cruth" with distinción): with the narrator becoming slightly more out-of-breath with each verse. This is only enhanced by the ending, where the narrator laments that her beloved is "moving to Wales / to live in Llanfairpwllgwyngyllgogerychwyrndrobwllllantysiliogogogoch."

Sondheim wrote the song's lyrics under the pseudonym of "Esteban Ria Nido", which Sondheim described as "a part-translation and part-transliteration of my name." In The Mad Show's playbill, the lyrics were credited to "Nom de Plume".

== Other performances ==
"The Boy From..." was also featured in the 1976 revue Side by Side by Sondheim, performed by Millicent Martin.

In 2020, 54 years after she debuted the song, Linda Lavin performed it again as part of Take Me to the World: A Sondheim 90th Birthday Celebration.

The song was included in the 2022 revue Stephen Sondheim's Old Friends.
