= The Shoemaker and the Peddler =

1960 musical by Armand Aulicino and Frank Fields

- Original language: English
- Written by: Armand Aulicino
- Music by: Frank Fields
- Lyrics by: Armand Aulicino

Premiere
- Date: October 13, 1960
- Place: East 74th Street Theater, New York
- Directed by: Lee Nemetz

The Shoemaker and the Peddler is a 1960 musical based on the story of Sacco and Vanzetti written by Armand Aulicino with music by Frank Fields.

The play had 43 performances at the East 74th Street Theater.

== Bibliography ==
- Crist, Judith (October 9, 1960). "Off-Broadway Scoop: Home-Grown Musicals". New York Herald Tribune. ProQuest 1336364111.
- "Fields Has Fine Score For Off-Bway Musical". New York Amsterdam News. New York, N.Y., United States. November 5, 1960. p. 16. ProQuest 225482919.
- "Legitimate: Off-Broadway Reviews - The Shoemakter and the Peddler". Variety. Vol. 220, no. 9. October 26, 1960. pp. 73, 78. ISSN 0042-2738. ProQuest 1014815843.
- Morgenstern, Joseph (October 15, 1960). "'The Shoemaker and the Peddler'". New York Herald Tribune. p. 6. ProQuest 1327670185.
- Taubman, Howard (October 15, 1960). "Theatre: Sacco and Vanzetti Drama; The Shoemaker and the Peddler' Opens Musical Version Fails to Achieve Its Aims". The New York Times. ISSN 0362-4331.
- Thompson, Howard (February 9, 1969). "Stage: A Sacco-Vanzetti Music Drama; Equity Library Offers Fine Show Uptown". The New York Times. ISSN 0362-4331.
- "The Shoemaker and the Peddler". The Best Plays of 1960–1961. Dodd, Mead, & Co. 1961. pp. 352–353.
