= All Night Long (1962 film) =

British drama by Basil Dearden

- Directed by: Basil Dearden
- Written by: Nel King; Paul Jarrico
- Based on: Othello by William Shakespeare
- Produced by: Michael Relph
- Starring: Patrick McGoohan; Keith Michell; Betsy Blair; Paul Harris; Marti Stevens; Richard Attenborough
- Cinematography: Edward Scaife
- Edited by: John D. Guthridge
- Music by: Philip Green (Musical Director)
- Production company: Rank Organisation
- Distributed by: J. Arthur Rank
- Release date: 6 February 1962
- Running time: 91 minutes
- Country: United Kingdom
- Language: English

All Night Long (also known as Night People) is a 1962 British neo noir drama film directed by Basil Dearden and starring Patrick McGoohan, Keith Michell, Betsy Blair, Paul Harris, Marti Stevens, and Richard Attenborough. The story by Nel King and Paul Jarrico (who wrote under the pseudonym "Peter Achilles") is an updated version of William Shakespeare's Othello, set in the London jazz scene of the 1960s. The action takes place in a single evening, during an anniversary party. The black-and-white film features performances by several prominent British jazz musicians – among them John Dankworth and Tubby Hayes – as well as the Americans Dave Brubeck and Charles Mingus, who were in the UK in 1961 when filming took place and were recruited to participate.

== Plot ==
Rod Hamilton, a wealthy jazz aficionado, throws a big one-year wedding anniversary party for Aurelius Rex, a bandleader and pianist, and Delia Lane, a retired singer, in a Thames-side warehouse in London that he remodeled to create a space for all-night parties and jam sessions, which he cannot hold at his house in upscale Mayfair. Johnny Cousin, Rex's drummer, has been trying to start his own band. He has arranged for Rod to fund the venture, and also has interested Lou Berger, a powerful booking agent, but the support of both men is dependent on the truth of Johnny's claim that Delia will be his vocalist. When Delia tells Johnny at the party that she has decided not to come out of retirement because she fears it will cause tension in her marriage, Johnny initiates a complex series of machinations intended to break up her and Rex.

Johnny decides to try to make Rex believe that Delia is having an affair with her friend Cass Michaels, an alto sax player in Rex's band and Rex's road manager. Knowing that Cass is a recovered drug addict, Johnny gets him to smoke marijuana, and then tells him that Berger does not think he should be managing Rex's tour, which results in Cass blowing up at Berger and Rex firing him. Then, Johnny uses Rod's recording equipment to record Cass talking with him and then Delia, and edits the tape to make the conversations – which are about how Cass feels about his girlfriend Benny and how Delia will try to get Rex to forgive Cass – seem as though they are about Cass and Delia's affair. He drops hints to Rex that play on Rex's fears of losing Delia, and Delia's performance of a song, rehearsed solely for the party as a surprise for Rex, furthers Rex's suspicions that she is unhappy at home.

Finally, Rex decides to listen to Johnny's doctored tape. He attacks Delia, strangling her, and then assaults Cass when he tries to intervene, sending him over the railing of a balcony in the warehouse. In front of the whole party, Rex accuses Delia and Cass of infidelity. When Emily, Johnny's long-suffering wife, asks Rex why he is behaving this way, Rex tells her to ask Johnny, and Emily breaks down and emotionally proclaims that Johnny is "a liar. He never told the truth in his whole life." Rex mentions the tape, and Benny figures out that Cass was talking about her, not Delia, which the seriously-injured Cass verifies.

His plot exposed, Johnny runs out of the room, pursued by Rex, who is kept from strangling Johnny to death by the appearance of the bruised – but alive – Delia. Rex slowly walks back to Cass, who assures him that "Everything's cool", and then leaves the warehouse. Delia runs after Rex, and he stops, but when he sees the marks of his fingers on her neck, he continues to walk away. As an ambulance arrives, Delia chases him down again, and he stops once more.

Cass is loaded into the ambulance and Benny goes with him. All of the other guests leave, but Johnny stays behind, noodling on the drums. Emily tells him it is time to go and says, "I love you", to which he replies: "Don't you understand, I don't want to be loved...I love nobody. Don't even love Johnny...Go find somebody else to love." As Emily, and then Rod, exit, leaving Johnny alone in the nearly-dark warehouse playing a frantic solo on the drums, outside, Rex and Delia walk along the embankment, their arms around each other's shoulders.

== Cast ==
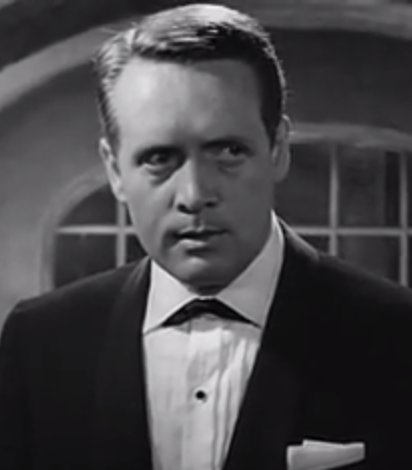
Patrick McGoohan as Johnny Cousin

- Patrick McGoohan as Johnny Cousin, Rex's ambitious drummer
- Keith Michell as Cass Michaels, an alto sax player in Rex's band, Rex's road manager, and Delia's friend
- Betsy Blair as Emily Cousin, Johnny's wife
- Paul Harris as Aurelius Rex, a bandleader, a pianist, and Delia's husband
- Marti Stevens as Delia Lane, a retired singer and Rex's wife
- Richard Attenborough as Rod Hamilton, a wealthy British jazz aficionado
- Bernard Braden as Lou Berger, a powerful booking agent
- Harry Towb as Sam Phales, Berger's toady
- María Velasco as Benny, Rex's vocalist and Cass' girlfriend
- Michael Anthony as the caterer (uncredited)
- Nick Edmett as Tuttle, the young waiter (uncredited)

Musicians appearing as themselves:

- Dave Brubeck – piano
- John Dankworth – alto sax
- Charles Mingus – bass
- Bert Courtley – trumpet
- Keith Christie – trombone
- Ray Dempsey – guitar
- Allan Ganley – drums
- Tubby Hayes – tenor sax and vibes
- Barry Morgan – bongos (Morgan plays a South American named Paco O'Toole)
- Kenny Napper – bass
- Colin Purbrook – piano
- John Scott – alto sax and flute
- Harry Beckett – trumpet (uncredited)

== Production ==
Screenwriter Paul Jarrico, who had been blacklisted, was credited as "Peter Achilles" in the film's credits. The Writers Guild of America West restored Jarrico's credit for this film and three others in 1998. Betsy Blair, who plays Emily, also fell prey to the House UnAmerican Activities Committee. Gene Kelly, her husband at the time, intervened to get her the part in Marty (1955) for which she earned an Academy Award nomination, but she eventually had to move to Europe to pursue her career.

On the soundtrack, drummer Allan Ganley is heard performing Patrick McGoohan's drum parts, though McGoohan did learn to play the drums for the film.

=== Music ===
The film features "new musical numbers by":

- Philip Green – several pieces
- Dave Brubeck – a new version of "It's a Raggy Waltz"
- John Dankworth – "Fall Guy"
- Tubby Hayes – "The Chase"
- Charles Mingus (with Brubeck) – the improvised composition "Non-Sectarian Blues" (as it is titled on Columbia Records releases)
- Kenny Napper – "Sax Reference"
- John Scott – "Scott-Free"

== Reception ==
The Monthly Film Bulletin wrote: "To combine an all-star jazz jamboree and a modern idiom version of Othello in one film is to make sure that no one is satisfied. Jazz fans will hear too little of their favourites – though Brubeck and Dankworth get reasonably clear runs – and may well be distracted by the excessive number of crane and tracking-shots. Anyone looking for straight drama will find the narrative with its doped cigarettes, tape-recorder stratagems, copious intrigues, corny jazz jargon spoken in mid-Atlantic accents, and more or less happy ending, both unconvincing and wearying."

David Meeker, author of Jazz in the Movies (1982), described the film as a "ludicrous combination of Othello and jazz jamboree that falls flat on both counts".

Jeff Stafford of TCM.com, on the other hand, wrote that "the film was unfairly maligned by many British critics who were Shakespeare purists and dismissed [it] as a travesty of the original with a 'happy' ending – sacrilege! – and the added gimmick of featuring such well known jazz artists as Charles Mingus, Dave Brubeck and John Dankworth. Gimmick or not, the movie is worth a look if only for the exhilarating musical numbers and a rare look at Mingus and Brubeck in their only appearance in a dramatic film. Even more compelling is Patrick McGoohan's frenzied, hyperactive performance as the scheming sociopath Johnnie Cousin."

In his November 11, 1962, "British Film Scene" column in The New York Times, Stephen Watts included a piece about Patrick McGoohan, titled "On the Ascendant", in which he noted that the actor "has been well received here for his appearance as the somewhat neurotic jazz drummer in All Night Long."

Filmink argued "the public didn’t much like this film – for one thing, it has a happy ending and we’re not sure that Othello works with a happy ending – but it is endlessly fascinating and has been critically rediscovered in recent years."

== Home media ==
The film was released on DVD in the UK by Network in 2007, and in the US by The Criterion Collection in January 2011 as part of their "Eclipse Series" box set "Basil Dearden's London Underground". A Blu-ray edition of the film was released by Network in 2016.
