= Penny Fuller =

American actress and singer

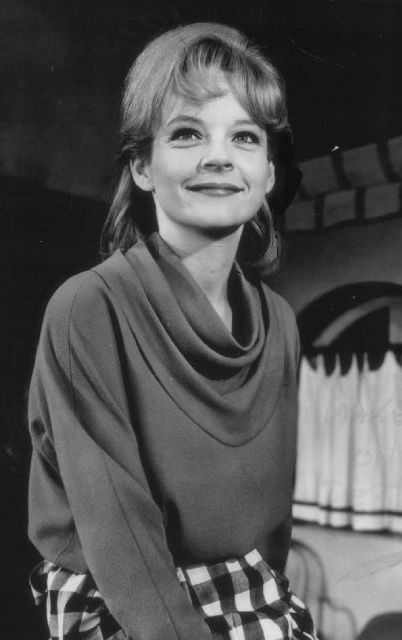
- Fuller in Barefoot in the Park in 1964
- Born: Durham, North Carolina, U.S.
- Education: Northwestern University
- Occupation: Actress
- Years active: 1960–present
- Spouse: Knox Kinlaw (m. 1977)
- Children: 1

Penny Fuller is an American actress. She received two Tony Award nominations for her performances on Broadway stage: for Applause (1970), and The Dinner Party (2001). For her television performances, Fuller received six Emmy Award nominations, winning once, in 1982, for playing Madge Kendal in The Elephant Man.

== Early life and family ==
Fuller was born in Durham, North Carolina. She moved to Lumberton when she was a teenager with her mother Helen and her stepfather, Andy Roundtree. She attended Lumberton High School and Northwestern University, where her teachers included Alvina Krause.

== Career ==
Fuller moved to New York City, and in 1960 appeared at the East 74th Street Theater in George Gershwin's Oh, Kay!, with Linda Lavin and Marti Stevens. She made her Broadway debut in The Moon Besieged (1962); she appeared as a replacement in the original productions of Barefoot in the Park (1963) and Cabaret (1966).

After a handful of Shakespearean productions, Fuller gained notice on Broadway for her portrayal of the outwardly sweet but subtly undermining Eve Harrington in Applause (1970–1972), the musical version of All About Eve with Lauren Bacall as Margo Channing. She started in Richard Rodgers' 1976 flop about Henry VIII, Rex, in which she appeared opposite Nicol Williamson and Glenn Close. Fuller continued to work in musicals, including the original production of William Finn's A New Brain and a 1999 revival of Rodgers' Do I Hear a Waltz? at New Jersey's George Street Playhouse. In later years, Fuller was also on Broadway in the original productions of Wendy Wasserstein's An American Daughter (1997) and Neil Simon's The Dinner Party (2000); she was Tony-nominated for the latter. Off-Broadway appearances have included Three Viewings (1995) and Nicky Silver's Beautiful Child. Most recently, appeared as the Old Lady/Blair Daniels in the 2017 revival of Sunday in the Park with George and as the Dowager Empress in Anastasia.

Fuller has extensive television work to her credit, including an Emmy-winning performance as Mrs. Kendal in the TV version of Bernard Pomerance's play The Elephant Man (1982) and Cat on a Hot Tin Roof (1984) by Tennessee Williams, in which she played Mae (a.k.a. Sister Woman). In 1992 she played Nancy McKeon's mother Ruth Benson in the CBS movie Baby Snatcher.

Fuller portrayed Amanda Harding in the ABC crime drama Fortune Dane (1986). She also appeared in dozens of other TV series, including The Edge of Night (1964), Love, American Style (1969), The Bob Newhart Show (1972), The F.B.I. (1972), Banacek (1973), The Six Million Dollar Man (1974), Barnaby Jones (1975), Family (1977), Trapper John, M.D. (1979 and 1981), One Day at a Time (1983), The Love Boat (1983 and 1985), Matlock (1988), L.A. Law (1988), Murder, She Wrote (1988 and 1993), China Beach (1989–90), Columbo (1990), Quantum Leap (1992), NYPD Blue (1994), Mad About You (1994–95), Melrose Place (1994–95), ER (1995), Law & Order (1998) and Judging Amy (2002 and 2005).

Her film work includes All the President's Men (1976) and The Beverly Hillbillies (1993).

== Personal life ==
Fuller married Knox Kinlaw, an Atlanta doctor, in 1977. They had a daughter that same year.

== Filmography ==
- Women in Chains (1972, TV movie) as Helen Anderson
- The Bob Newhart Show (1972, TV series) as Nancy, episode "Goodbye Nancy"
- Applause (1973, TV movie) as Eve Harrington
- Banacek (1973, TV series) as Gloria Hamilton, episode "The Greatest Collection of Them All"
- Chopper One (1974, TV series) as Laura Burnett, M.D., episode "Deadly Carrier"
- The Six Million Dollar Man (1974, TV series) as Dr. Chris Forbes, episode "Population: Zero"
- All the President's Men (1976) as Sally Aiken
- Amber Waves (1980, TV movie) as Fern Jensen
- The Elephant Man (1982, TV movie) as Mrs. Kendal
- A Piano for Mrs. Cimino (1982, TV movie) as Mrs. Polanski
- Lois Gibbs and the Love Canal (1982, TV movie) as Jeannie Kolchak
- Intimate Agony (1983, TV movie) as Joanna
- Quantum Leap (1992, TV Series) as Jane Lindhurst, episode "The Play's the Thing"
- License to Kill (1984, TV movie) as Judith Peterson
- Cat on a Hot Tin Roof (1984, TV movie) as Mae
- As Summers Die (1986, TV movie) as Marci Holt
- George Washington II: The Forging of a Nation (1986, TV movie) as Elizabeth Willing Powel
- The Two Mrs. Grenvilles (1987, TV mini-series) as Cordelia Grenville Hardington
- Fire and Rain (1989, TV movie) as Mrs. Hamilton
- Lies Before Kisses (1991, TV movie) as Katherine
- False Arrest (1991, TV movie) as Marilyn Redmond
- Miss Rose White (1992, TV movie) as Kate Ryan
- Baby Snatcher (1992, TV movie) as Ruth Benson
- Rio Shannon (1993, TV movie) as Beatrice Minister
- Star (1993, TV movie) as Olivia Wyatt
- The Beverly Hillbillies (1993) as Mrs. Margaret Drysdale
- Melrose Place (1993–94) as Marilyn Carter
- Mad About You (1993-1995) as Theresa Stemple
- The Gift of Love(1994, TV movie) as Leora
- All My Children (1995–96) as Lois (Erika Kane's rehab roommate)
- Shadow Conspiracy (1997) as Dr. Olson
- The Color of Love: Jacey's Story (2000, TV movie) as Madeleine Porter
- King of the Corner (2004) as Mrs. Hargrove
- James McNeill Whistler and the Case for Beauty (2014) as Anna Whistler (voice)
- Strawberry Mansion (2021) as Arabella Isadora
