= East 74th Street Theater =

Theater in Manhattan, New York

- Interactive map of East 74th Street Theater
- Address: 334 East 74th Street; Manhattan, New York City, New York; United States
- Coordinates: 40°46′10″N 73°57′22″W
- Capacity: 199-204 seats

Construction
- Opened: 1959
- Architect: Barrie B. Greenbie

The East 74th Street Theater, sometimes spelled as the East 74th Street Theatre, was an Off-Broadway theater at 334 East 74th Street in Manhattan, New York City, United States.

== History ==
Frank Day Tuttle, a theatrical and radio producer and director, purchased, renovated, and converted the Bohemian Club into the East 74th Street Theater. Barrie B. Greenbie designed the theater in 1959.

The Off-Broadway theater was located at 334 East 74th Street, between First Avenue and Second Avenue, on the Upper East Side in Manhattan, New York City. It had 199-204 seats. Its stage was described as "miniscule [sic]." The Players Magazine described it in 1959 as "small and attractive."

In 1961, the Phoenix Theatre rented the theater for 30 weeks, during which time it called it the Phoenix 74th Street.

== Performances ==
In 1959, the theater put on the comedy The Tempest by William Shakespeare.

Among the other plays presented at the theater were The Crystal Heart (1960; with Mildred Dunnock, and Virginia Vestoff in her first professional appearance, with top seats selling for $4.96 ($53.98 in current dollar terms), George Gershwin's Oh, Kay! (1960; with Linda Lavin, Penny Fuller, and Marti Stevens, and with high school student Daniel Lewis working a follow spot in the lighting), The Shoemaker and the Peddler (1960), One Way Pendulum by N. F. Simpson (1961), Hotel Passionato (1965), The Bernard Shaw Story (1965-66), Jean Erdman's The Coach with the Six Insides (1967), Stephen D. (1967; with Roy Scheider), and The Victims (1968).

In the fall of 1965, Jack Moore and Jeff Duncan formed the Dance Theater Workshop, and produced a series of Monday evening concerts at the theater. In 1966, the theater hosted a subscription series devoted to modern and ethnic dance.
