= Marti Stevens (actress) =

American actress and singer

- Born: Martha Schenk; New York City, United States
- Occupations: Actress, singer
- Years active: 1950s to 1980s

Marti Stevens (née Martha Schenk; born New York City) is a retired American singer and actress. She appeared in television shows such as It Takes a Thief, The Love Boat and Stagecoach West. She appeared in an Australian production of the play Forty Carats and in High Spirits, the musical version of Blithe Spirit, in London's West End in 1964. She also had a starring role in the 1962 film, All Night Long.

== Early life ==
Born Martha Schenk, she was the daughter of American film studio executive, Nicholas Schenck. She was a close friend of actresses Marlene Dietrich and Rachel Roberts.

In 1963, she had a surprise visit from a queen. Queen Frederika and Princess Irene of Greece were being chased down the road by protestors and were ringing door bells looking for refuge. Stevens heard the bell ring and came to the door dressed in a bath towel. She let them in and gave them both a scotch.

== Music career ==
=== Clubs ===
In late November 1959, she began a two-week engagement at the Ankara club. It was reported in the Pittsburgh Post-Gazette (December 6, 1959) that she, along with the Chandra Kaly Dancers, were to stay on an extra week.

=== Other events ===
In January 2016, it was announced that Stevens, along with Barbara Cook, Billy Porter, Lea Salonga, De'Adre Aziza, Amanda Green, Emmy Raver-Lampman, Lindsay Mendez, Rebecca Naomi Jones, Telly Leung, and others were to perform at a benefit concert connected with the late Lena Horne. The event was to take place at New York City's Symphony Space on January 11, 2016.

== Stage ==
In 1960, Stevens appeared at the East 74th Street Theater in George Gershwin's Oh, Kay!, with Penny Fuller and Linda Lavin.

In March 1970, having been brought to Australia by Philip Productions, she was appearing at the Anthenaeum theater in Melbourne with Tony Hanlon in the James Burrows directed Forty Carats.

== Film and television roles ==
In 1962, she had a role in the film All Night Long, a film with the British jazz-scene as its backdrop, based on Shakespeare's Othello. She played the role of Delia Lane, wife of a black musician, Aurelius Rex, played by Paul Harris. They become victim to the devious and sinister meddling by musician Johnny Cousin, played by Patrick McGoohan. Stevens sings two songs in the film.

== Filmography ==
Film
Title	Role	Director	Year	Notes
Abdulla the Great	Singer	Gregory Ratoff	1955	
Frische Brise	Singer	Ruprecht Essberger	1955	TV movie
All Night Long	Delia Lane	Basil Dearden	1962	Film, based on Othello
Ziegfeld: The Man and His Women	Blanche Burke	Buzz Kulik	1978	TV movie
The Choice	Marie	David Greene	1981	TV movie
The Day the Bubble Burst	Role	Joseph Hardy	1982	TV movie

Television
Title	Episode #	Role	Director	Year	Notes #
M Squad	Contraband	Eve Parker	Don Medford	1958	Season 2, episode 13
Stagecoach West	The Saga of Jeremy Boone	Felicia Sparks	Thomas Carr	1960	Season 1, episode 8
Emergency-Ward 10	Episode #1.729	Barbara Dodge	Alastair Reid	1964	Season 1, episode 729
Emergency-Ward 10	Episode #1.730	Barbara Dodge	Alastair Reid	1964	Season 1, episode 730
Emergency-Ward 10	Episode #1.732	Barbara Dodge	Cecil Petty	1964	Season 1, episode 732
Emergency-Ward 10	Episode #1.733	Barbara Dodge	Shaun O'Riordan	1964	Season 1, episode 733
Emergency-Ward 10	Episode #1.735	Barbara Dodge	Alastair Reid	1964	Season 1, episode 735
Emergency-Ward 10	Episode #1.737	Barbara Dodge	Shaun O'Riordan	1964	Season 1, episode 737
Emergency-Ward 10	Episode #1.738	Barbara Dodge	Cecil Petty	1964	Season 1, episode 738
Emergency-Ward 10	Episode #1.739	Barbara Dodge	Shaun O'Riordan	1964	Season 1, episode 739
Emergency-Ward 10	Episode #1.740	Barbara Dodge	Josephine Douglas	1964	Season 1, episode 740
It Takes a Thief	Locked in the Cradle of the Keep	Commissar Malenska	Leonard Horn	1968	Season 1, episode 14
Mannix	End of the Rainbow	Mrs. O'Farrell	Robert L. Friend	1968	Season 2, episode 5
Kojak	Mouse	Beth Avild	Harvey S. Laidman	1978	Season 5, episode 14
Hart to Hart	This Lady Is Murder	Althea Prinz	Earl Bellamy	1980	Season 2, episode 3
The Love Boat	The Lady from Laramie/Vicki Swings/Phantom Bride	Miss Singleton	Jack Arnold	1981	Season 5, episode 7
