= The Lyons =

- Original language: English
- Written by: Nicky Silver
- Characters: Ben Lyons; Rita Lyons; Curtis Lyons; Lisa Lyons
- Genre: Drama/Comedy
- Setting: A hospital room

Premiere
- Date: October 11, 2011 (Off-Broadway); April 23, 2012 (Broadway)
- Place: Vineyard Theatre; New York City

The Lyons is a play by Nicky Silver. The play first ran Off-Broadway in 2011 and then premiered on Broadway in 2012. This marks the Broadway debut of a Nicky Silver play. The setting is mainly in a hospital where Ben, the husband and father, is dying from cancer.

== Productions ==
The Lyons opened at the Vineyard Theatre on September 22, 2011 (in previews) and closed on November 20, 2011. Directed by Mark Brokaw, the cast featured Linda Lavin (Rita Lyons), Dick Latessa (Ben Lyons), Michael Esper (Curtis Lyons), Kate Jennings Grant (Lisa Lyons), Gregory Wooddell (Brian) and Brenda Pressley (A Nurse). Scenic design was by Allen Moyer, lighting by David Lander, costumes by Michael Krass and the original music and sound design by David Van Tieghem.

The Lyons premiered on Broadway at the Cort Theatre on April 23, 2012, after previews from April 5. The Off-Broadway cast and creative team continued. The play closed on July 1, 2012 after 80 performances and 21 previews.

The play opened in London at the Menier Chocolate Factory on September 19, 2013 running to November 16, 2013. Mark Brokaw directed with a cast that featured Tom Ellis as Curtis. Other actors included Charlotte Randle (Lisa), Katy Secombe and Ben Aldridge.

== Plot ==
Ben Lyons is in a hospital where he is dying from cancer. His family gathers around him. They are his wife, Rita, and grown children, Curtis Lyons and Lisa Lyons. Also present is his nurse. Ben is no longer constrained by manners and says whatever he wishes, including expletives. Rita, trapped in a 40-year loveless marriage, now thinks of the future without Ben and plans to re-decorate. Lisa is an alcoholic, who has left an abusive marriage; Curtis, homosexual, has had little to do with his father, who is homophobic. In a getaway from the hospital, Curtis looks at an apartment with the help of an actor moonlighting as a real estate agent.

== Reception ==
In its review of the Off-Broadway production, the Variety reviewer wrote: "The basic joke of Silver's savage comedy is that the characters are given license to speak their private thoughts out loud ... As amazing as Lavin is at playing Rita's ferocious lust for life, she's surprisingly touching when Rita speaks with quiet dread of the lonely life she sees ahead of her. As monsters go, she's rather endearing ... the two Lyons offspring, who fuss and fight but remain one-note characters."

Michael Feingold, reviewing the Off-Broadway production for The Village Voice, noted "The Lyons family seems to be the standard-issue dysfunctional middle-class Jewish-suburban family of several thousand previous Broadway and Off-Broadway dramas with comic relief, or comedies with poignant relief ... But this is the Nicky Silver edition of such a play; the expected things happen here, but happen quite differently ... Lavin's performance might be what holds these contradictory elements in perfect balance. Blessed with the magic power to make every moment onstage embody truth, she's a purveyor of gigantic nuances, comic or tragic as needed: Her tiniest gestures seem epic; her minutest shifts of vocal tone ring out grandly."

In reviewing the Broadway production, theatermania.com called the play "deliciously dark and hilarious." The reviewer goes on to write "Silver's ability to find both the humor and pain in this ghoulish scenario proves to be a hallmark of the piece, which can also find the funny in alcoholism and spousal abuse."

== Awards and nominations ==
The play received nominations for the Drama League Award for Distinguished Production Of A Play and Distinguished Performance Award, Linda Lavin.

The play received nominations for the Outer Critics Circle Award for Outstanding New Broadway Play; Mark Brokaw (Outstanding Director of a Play); and Linda Lavin (Outstanding Actress in a Play).

Nominations for the Drama Desk Award include: Outstanding Play and Outstanding Actress in a Play, Linda Lavin.

Linda Lavin received a nomination for the 2012 Tony Award, Best Performance by an Actress in a Leading Role in a Play.

== See also ==
- Theater of the United States
