= Omnium Gatherum (play) =

Omnium Gatherum is a play written in 2003 by Theresa Rebeck and Alexandra Gersten-Vassilaros. It was one of three finalists for the 2004 Pulitzer Prize for Drama.

== Productions ==
Omnium Gatherum premiered in March 2003 at the Humana Festival in Louisville, Kentucky.

The play opened Off-Broadway at the Variety Arts Theatre on September 9, 2003 in previews and closed on November 30, 2003. Directed by Will Frears, the cast featured Amir Arison, Jenny Bacon, Phillip Clark (Roger), Melanna Gray (Julia), Edward A. Hajj, Kristine Nielsen (Suzie), Dean Nolen (Terence), and Joseph Lyle Taylor.

The play had its West Coast premiere at ACT Theatre in Seattle, Washington in October 2003.

=== Background ===
"The origins of the play date to the morning of September 11, 2001." Rebeck: "We [Gersten-Vassilaros] were on the phone with each other during the catastrophe, then the phones all went out and we couldn't talk for days... And when we reconnected after 9-11 we both felt right away that we wanted to engage in it as writers." The two finally decided that a dinner party "would be the best vehicle for the play's commentary about the world after Sept. 11." Gersten-Vassilaros: "You have people arguing with each other, but they all must eat food together."

== Plot summary ==
A sophisticated and sometimes surreal dinner party in Manhattan becomes a sounding board for a variety of cultural icons as they pontificate and argue about capitalism, terrorism, popular culture, feminism, food, wealth, heroism, morality, Eastern meditation, Star Trek, and justice. The evening is hosted by Suzie, a former caterer, in her beautiful dining room. She has invited Terence, a British journalist, Roger, an American writer, and Julia, an African-American, among others. The conversation veers from comedy to realism to satire and ends in chaos. Over it all hangs the shadow of the 9/11 terrorist attacks.

== Critical response ==
Ben Brantley in his review in The New York Times wrote: "It is indeed a comédie à clef of sorts, with characters inspired by Martha Stewart, the journalist Christopher Hitchens, the novelist Tom Clancy and Edward Said... What makes the play sing and sting is its radical yet perfectly organic shifts in tone. Tragedy and triviality, ponderousness and pettiness are mixed into a salad so deliriously tossed that you can't separate the individual ingredients."

Charles Isherwood, reviewing for Variety, wrote: "They and their sharp cast deliver a bubbly 90 minutes of entertainment as the play skillfully spices its middlebrow TV-chat-show essence with infusions of boldly orchestrated comedy."
