= Mary Rodgers =

American composer, author and screenwriter (1931–2014)

- Born: January 11, 1931; New York City, U.S.
- Died: June 26, 2014 (aged 83); New York City, U.S.
- Education: Wellesley College
- Occupations: Composer, screenwriter, children's fiction writer
- Years active: 1959–2014
- Spouses: Julian B. Beaty Jr. (m. 1951; div. 1957) Henry Guettel (m. 1961; died 2013)
- Children: 6, including Adam Guettel
- Parents: Richard Rodgers (father); Dorothy Feiner (mother)

Mary Rodgers (January 11, 1931 – June 26, 2014) was an American composer, screenwriter, and author. She wrote the 1972 novel Freaky Friday, which served as the basis of a 1976 film starring Jodie Foster, for which she wrote the screenplay, as well as three other versions. Her best-known musicals were Once Upon a Mattress and The Mad Show, and she contributed songs to Marlo Thomas' successful 1972 children's album Free to Be... You and Me.

== Early life ==
Rodgers, who was of Jewish heritage, was born in New York City. She was a daughter of composer Richard Rodgers and his wife, Dorothy Belle (née Feiner). She had a sister, Mrs. Linda Emory. She attended the Brearley School in Manhattan, and majored in music at Wellesley College.

She began writing music at the age of 16 and her professional career began with writing songs for Little Golden Records, which were albums for children with three-minute songs. One of these recordings, "Ali Baba and the 40 Thieves", which was released in 1957, featured performances by Bing Crosby of songs Mary Rodgers wrote with lyricist Sammy Cahn. She also composed music for television, including the jingle for the Prince Spaghetti commercial.

== Career ==
Her first full-length musical, Once Upon a Mattress, which was also her first collaboration with lyricist Marshall Barer (with whom she continued to write songs for nearly a decade), opened Off Broadway in May 1959 and moved to Broadway later in the year. Following the show's initial run of 244 performances, there were a US tour (in 1960), a production in London's West End (also 1960), three televised productions (in 1964, 1972, and 2005), and a Broadway revival (1996). Cast albums were released for the original Broadway production, the original London production, and the Broadway revival. To this day, the show is frequently performed by community and school groups across the United States.

Another significant compositional project for Rodgers was The Mad Show, a musical revue based on Mad magazine which opened Off Broadway in January 1966 and ran for a total of 871 performances. An original cast album, produced by Goddard Lieberson, was released on Columbia Masterworks. Although the show also began as a collaboration with Barer, he quit before the project was completed and the show's remaining songs feature lyrics by Larry Siegel (co-author of the show's book with Jay Thompson and Dean Fuller and a prolific Mad magazine movie and television parody writer), Steven Vinaver, and Stephen Sondheim, who contributed the lyrics to a parody of "The Girl from Ipanema" called "The Boy From..." under the pseudonym Esteban Ria Nido.

None of her other shows had the same level of success, but Rodgers also wrote music for musicals and revues, the first on Broadway being Davy Jones' Locker with Bil Baird's marionettes, which had a two-week run at the Morosco Theatre from March 28 to April 11, 1959. (She also wrote the lyrics.) Others included From A to Z (1960), Hot Spot (1963), Working (1978), and Phyllis Newman's one-woman show The Madwoman of Central Park West (1979). A revue of Rodgers's music titled Hey, Love, conceived and directed by Richard Maltby Jr. ran in June 1993 at Eighty-Eight's in New York City.

She later wrote children's books, most notably the popular Freaky Friday (1972), which was made into a 1976 feature film, for which she wrote the screenplay, and was remade for television in 1995, and again for cinemas in 2003, screenplay by Heather Hach and Leslie Dixon "based on the book by Mary Rodgers", followed by a 2025 sequel, story by Elyse Hollander and Jordan Weiss "based on the book by Mary Rodgers".

One of the inspirations for Freaky Friday was a novel by Thorne Smith called Turnabout. As Rodgers was considering a new children's book, following several picture books for young children, she remembered "that when I was fourteen, I'd read and loved a novel called Turnabout, by Thorne Smith. Vicious and hilarious, it was something I thought I could emulate in children's fiction ... for teens."

Rodgers' other children's books include The Rotten Book (1969), A Billion for Boris (1974, later republished under the title ESP TV), and Summer Switch (1982), and she contributed songs to the landmark children's album Free to Be... You and Me. She also wrote the screenplay for the 1981 fantasy-comedy The Devil and Max Devlin. Rodgers made a few brief forays back into writing for musical theater, including an adaptation of her book Freaky Friday (featuring music and lyrics by John Forster), which was presented by Theatreworks/USA in 1991, and The Griffin and the Minor Canon, which was produced by Music Theatre Group, but after the latter show she never composed another note of music and never even played the piano again. She later explained, "I had a pleasant talent but not an incredible talent ... I was not my father or my son. And you have to abandon all kinds of things."

In 2022, eight years after she died, Rodgers' memoirs were published in Shy: The Alarmingly Outspoken Memoirs of Mary Rodgers, co-authored by Jesse Green.

== Personal life ==
Her first husband, whom she married in December 1951, was lawyer Julian B. Beaty, Jr.; they had three children. This marriage ended in 1957. She and her second husband, film executive Henry Guettel, had three sons, including Adam, a Tony Award-winning musical theater composer. Henry died in October 2013 at the age of 85.

Mary Rodgers was a director of the Rodgers and Hammerstein Organization and a board member of ASCAP. She also served for several years as chairman of the Juilliard School.

She died from heart failure at her home in Manhattan on June 26, 2014.

== Publications ==
- Rodgers, Mary; Green, Jesse (2022). Shy: the alarmingly outspoken memoirs of Mary Rodgers. New York, NY: Farrar, Straus and Giroux. ISBN 978-0-374-29862-3. OCLC 1313444633.
