= The Mad Show =

- Music: Mary Rodgers
- Lyrics: Marshall Barer; Steven Vinaver; Stephen Sondheim
- Book: Larry Siegel; Stan Hart
- Basis: Mad magazine
- Productions: 1966 Off-Broadway

The Mad Show is an Off-Broadway musical revue based on Mad magazine, with music by Mary Rodgers and a book by Larry Siegel and Stan Hart. The show's various lyricists include Siegel, Marshall Barer, Steven Vinaver, and Stephen Sondheim. Actors who appeared in The Mad Show include Dorothy Emmerson, Carol Morley, and MacIntyre Dixon.

== Production ==
The revue opened on January 9, 1966, at the New Theatre, New York City, and ran for 871 performances. The original cast included Linda Lavin, Jo Anne Worley, Paul Sand, Richard Libertini, and MacIntyre Dixon. Sam Pottle conducted the music.

Joe Raposo, who later became music director for Sesame Street (a job held still later by Pottle), performed onstage as the Piano Player, who was shot during the course of each performance. He was also bludgeoned with a rubber chicken. The band's drummer was Danny Epstein, who later became Sesame Street's music coordinator from 1969 to 2009.

== Musical numbers ==
Act I

- "Overture"
- "Academy Awards for Parents"
- "Eccch!"
- "The Boy From..."
- "Well It Ain't"
- "Misery Is"
- "Handle With Care"
- "Hate Song"

Act II

- "Entr'acte"
- "You Can Never Tell"
- "Real Thing"
- "Looking for Someone"
- "Kiddie TV"
- "Gift of Maggie (And Others)"
- "Football in Depth"
- "Finale"

Additional sketches, including "Saboteurs", "Babysitter", "Hollywood Surplus", "Zoom", and "Snappy Answers", and the song "Hey, Sweet Momma" appeared during earlier versions of the production.

The lyrics of "The Boy From...", a parody of "The Girl from Ipanema", were semi-anonymously written by Stephen Sondheim. The official songwriting credit went to the pseudonym "Esteban Ria Nido", which Sondheim described as "a part-translation and part-transliteration of my name." In the show's playbill, the lyrics were credited to "Nom de Plume".

== Critical reception ==
The production got generally favorable reviews. The New York Times' Stanley Kaufmann wrote, "It asks for our imaginative support and (for a change) stimulates and deserves it ... it is always amusing." Kaufmann described cast member Libertini as "a bewigged insane beanpole", and Lavin as "an elfin hipster, pretty, delicately caustic, with fine timing and a face that is a kaleidoscope of the kooky." Life magazine described the show's freewheeling style: "The Mad Show, which is based more or less on Mad magazine and uses the magazine's grinning idiot symbol as a backdrop, is an explosion of insanity, a carnival of caterwauling idiots in fright wigs who sing and scream utterly ridiculous things. But they also make an unsettling amount of sense. They attack parents who devour their children, or children who devour their parents. They sing The Hate Song in which do-gooders vow to stamp out hate and conclude by stamping out one another. They attack TV coverage of pro-football with instant-split-second-ago playbacks while, for Pete's sake, you're missing the touchdown... the show's theme song is "Eccch!" – not a word, but a kind of Bronx cheer, which is how the Mad people feel about the way things are going."

== Recording ==
The original cast recording LP was released in 1966 by Columbia Masterworks (OL 2930 - mono / OS 2930 - stereo) and re-released on CD, February 22, 2005, by DRG Theater.
