= Bernard Pomerance =

American playwright

Bernard Pomerance (September 23, 1940 – August 26, 2017) was an American playwright and poet whose best known work is the play The Elephant Man.

== Career ==
Bernard Pomerance studied English and Philosophy at the University of Chicago and moved to London in 1968 as an aspiring novelist. In London he fell into the growing Fringe theatre scene, seduced by its experimentation and narrative freedom.

His first production was a trilogy of plays about the Vietnam War. High in Vietnam, Hot Damn was directed by Roland Rees and performed at several fringe venues, including Ed Berman's Ambience Theater, the London Polytechnic Festival, and Inter-action at the Almost Free Theatre. In 1972 Rees, David Aukin, and Pomerance founded the theatre company Foco Novo. The name was taken from Pomerance's play of the same title, the company's inaugural production.

For Foco Novo he adapted a new version of A Man’s a Man by Bertold Brecht, and it was there he wrote The Elephant Man. The story of John Merrick, which inspired the play, was passed on to Pomerance by his brother after a visit to a London medical museum. Hampstead Theatre under artistic director Michael Rudman co-produced the first production of The Elephant Man with Foco Novo and opened the play on tour at Nuffield Studio, Lancaster 24 October 1977 starring David Schofield as John Merrick. The play moved to its London premiere at Hampstead Theatre and eventually to the Lyttelton stage at the National Theatre. In New York the play was performed on and off Broadway, winning three 1979 Tony Awards including for Best Play and three Drama Desk Awards. The Elephant Man ran for 916 performances at The Booth Theatre and was made into a film for television with the original American cast. In 2013 Williamstown Theater Festival produced a revival of The Elephant Man, which starred Bradley Cooper, Patricia Clarkson and Alessandro Nivola. The play transferred to the Booth Theater on Broadway in Winter 2014, where it played to sold-out houses. It transferred to the Haymarket Theater, London, in Spring 2015 with the same cast.

The Hollywood film of the same name, directed by David Lynch, was not an adaptation of the play. Pomerance and the play's producers attempted to block the film's use of the title by suing the producers of the film, citing the shared title and subject matter.

Two of Pomerance's last plays take on politically weighted subjects of American history, Quantrill in Lawrence set during the Civil War and Melons, a play about an aged Native American man who confronts his old adversary, a cavalryman. Both plays were produced by the Royal Shakespeare Company, with Ben Kingsley playing the lead in Melons and his wife Alison Sutcliffe directing. Melons made its American debut at Yale Repertory Theatre in 1987, starring Carlos Montezuma, Tino Juarez Stolsky, and Earl Hindman. In 2020 an online / zoom performance of Melons starring Raoul Trujillo and Kiowa Gordon benefited Dr Michelle Toms and the United Natives Navajo COVID-19 project. Pomerance was inspired to write plays by the work of Eugene O’Neill, having seen the original production of Long Day's Journey into Night in 1956.

== Personal life ==
Bernard Kline Pomerance was born 23 September 1940 in Brooklyn, New York to Leon and Harriet Pomerance. His father was a business executive and amateur archeologist whose financial contributions made possible the rediscovery of an important Bronze Age palace at Crete. Pomerance's parents had a notable collection of classical antiquities, which after their deaths ended up distributed among other collectors and major U. S. museums.

Pomerance himself had a great interest in Native American cultures and artifacts and was close to many in the Native community. After his first marriage to British writer Sally Belfrage ended in 1983, he made his way to New Mexico, influenced by his friend, writer N. Scott Momaday. Pomerance settled in the village of Galisteo in a home once owned by the artist Judy Chicago. A novel in verse and prose, We Need to Dream All This Again: An Account of Crazy Horse, Custer, and the Battle of Black Hills, was published in 1987 to mixed reviews. He wrote a Western novella, The Ghost Wrestlers, which was inspired by Galisteo but never published.

In 1996 he was featured in Galisteo neighbor Bruce Nauman's installation piece, World Peace (Received), in which five video monitors project different speakers whose words form a pattern. Another important New Mexico friendship was with Jim "Little Wolf" Wilson, a musician and music producer who helped pioneer the sounds of both New Native and Worldbeat music. Pomerance appears on Wilson's album Tulku - A Universe to Come performing spoken word on the track, I Am.

In 2008 Pomerance married Evelyne Franceschi (1963–2015), a French woman he met through Jim Wilson and his wife Corrine. Franceschi died in 2015, and Pomerance died on August 26, 2017, both as a result of cancer. Pomerance was 76. He was survived by two children, Moby and Eve, from his first marriage and two grandchildren. A new film version of The Elephant Man with a screenplay written by Moby Pomerance is scheduled to begin shooting in 2026 and will star disability advocate and actor Adam Pearson.

== Published Work ==
- Break on Through to the Other Side: The War Crimes Trial of General Nelson Miles Held by the Dead. CONJUNCTIONS. No. 53. 2009.
- The Collected Plays of Bernard Pomerance. Grove Press. 2001.
- We Need to Dream All This Again : An Account of Crazy Horse, Custer and the Battle of the Black Hills. Viking. 1987.
- The Elephant Man. Grove Press. 1979.

== Sources ==
- Roland Rees, Fringe First: Pioneers of the New Theatre on Record, Oberon Books, 1996.
- I Am, A Universe to Come, TULKU (2002). Jim Wilson, producer. Bernard Pomerance performing spoken word. Verses from the ancient Coptic poem, The Thunder, Perfect Mind.
