= Nicky Silver =

American playwright

Nicky Silver is an American playwright. Formerly of Philadelphia, he resides in London. Many of his plays have been produced off-Broadway, and also at the Woolly Mammoth Theatre Company in Washington, D.C.

== Biography ==
=== Early life ===
Silver was born in 1960 in Philadelphia and as teen, attended Stagedoor Manor Performing Arts Training Center in upstate New York. He graduated from the New York University (NYU) Tisch School of the Arts.

=== Career ===
Many of his early plays were originally produced off-off-Broadway at the Vortex Theatre in New York. Later, his plays premiered at Off-Broadway venues such as the Vineyard Theatre and Playwrights Horizons. Silver noted: "My first real break came when the artistic director of the Woolly Mammoth Theatre in Washington, D.C. happened to walk in and saw, 'Fat Man in Skirts.'" Several of his plays received premieres at the Woolly Mammoth Theatre Company in Washington, DC, including Fat Men in Skirts (1991), Free Will and Wanton Lust (January 1993) and The Food Chain (1993–94 season). In her review of Fat Men in Skirts at Woolly Mammoth Theatre for The Washington Post, Lloyd Rose wrote: "Silver is a modern American absurdist in the tradition of John Guare or Harry Kondoleon, but more of a lowbrow. His go-for-the-laugh instincts are as naked as any sitcom writer's. The dizzying, rather wonderful thing about "Fat Men in Skirts" is that such a shallow technique is made to serve such a deep and anguished vision. Silver never met a pain he couldn't laugh at."

Pterodactyls was produced Off-Broadway at the Vineyard Theatre in October 1993. Ben Brantley wrote in his New York Times review: "His grimly witty play 'Pterodactyls' recycles all the cliches of the unraveling all-American family and scales them up to the point that they become poignantly grotesque symbols of a species on the verge of extinction... staged with firecracker snap by David Warren and illuminated by several incandescent performances, 'Pterodactyls' offers, for its first three-quarters, as much antic fizz as any comedy in town." Pterodactyls gained additional recognition in the media because the play was produced with large dinosaurs by sculptor Jim Gary in its sets. Raised in Captivity was produced at the Vineyard Theater in March 1995. Ben Brantley wrote in his New York Times review: "The roads to alienation, as modern literature can testify, are many and varied. But they have seldom been mapped out with the fearless combination of comic artifice and heart-wrenching empathy that Mr. Silver brings to them. 'Raised in Captivity' is about guilt, redemption and self-punishment, and against all odds, it is also very funny."

His plays Pterodactyls and Raised in Captivity received back-to-back Drama Desk Award nominations for Outstanding Play in 1994 and 1995, respectively.

His play The Food Chain ran Off-Broadway at the Westside Theatre in August 1995 to June 1996, (initially produced at the Woolly Mammoth Theatre) with direction by Robert Falls and a cast that featured Hope Davis, Patrick Fabian and Phyllis Newman. Ben Brantley in his New York Times review wrote: "In 'The Food Chain,' Nicky Silver's toxic, fractured tale of sex, loneliness and the importance of being thin, the pursuit of love is an even more convoluted process than usual. It's hard, after all, to forge a relationship when all you can really hear is the sound of your own voice. For the poisonously funny, image-obsessed Manhattanites in the play, all the world's a mirror. It's no accident that much of this breathless comedy of neuroses at the Westside Theater is made up of monologues, even though there are nearly always at least two people onstage." The play was nominated for the Outer Critics Circle Award as Outstanding Off-Broadway Play, and won the Obie Award, Performance for Tom McGowan.

Silver wrote the new book for the Broadway revival of the Rodgers and Hart musical, The Boys from Syracuse, produced by the Roundabout Theater Company in 2002.

The Lyons, opened on Broadway in April 2012, after an Off-Broadway run at the Vineyard Theater in 2011. It was his first play to be produced on Broadway. The play starred Linda Lavin and Dick Latessa.

His play Too Much Sun premiered Off-Broadway at the Vineyard Theatre on May 1, 2014, in previews, officially on May 18, with direction by Mark Brokaw and starring Linda Lavin and Jennifer Westfeldt.

This Day Forward premiered Off-Broadway on November 21, 2016, at the Vineyard Theatre. The play, a comedy, is directed by Mark Brokaw and features Holley Fain and Michael Crane.

== Original plays (select) ==
- Fat Men in Skirts 1989 (Vortex Theatre); 1991 (Woolly Mammoth)
- Pterodactyls - 1993
- Free Will and Wanton Lust - 1993
- Raised in Captivity - 1995
- The Food Chain - 1995
- Fit to be Tied - 1996
- The Maiden's Prayer - 1998
- The Eros Trilogy, consisting of Claire, Philip and Roger and Miriam - 1999
- The Altruists - 2000
- Beautiful Child - 2004
- The Agony and the Agony - 2006
- Three Changes - 2008
- The Lyons - 2011
- Too Much Sun - 2014
- This Day Forward – 2016

== Critical analysis ==
In the preface to his interview with Silver, David Savran locates Silver's work in the tradition of dark farce created by gay playwrights such as Oscar Wilde, Joe Orton, and Christopher Durang. Theatre scholar Jordan Schildcrout has noted the recurring theme of the prodigal son in Silver's plays, and sees Todd in Pterodactyls as a symbolic figure who challenges and subverts homophobic stereotypes used to vilify gay men during the AIDS crisis.

== Awards and honors ==
- 1994 - Pterodactyls - nominated for Outstanding Play, Drama Desk Awards
- 1995 - Raised in Captivity - nominated for Outstanding Play, Drama Desk Awards
- 2012 - The Lyons - nominated for Outstanding New Broadway Play; Mark Brokaw (Outstanding Director of a Play); and Linda Lavin (Outstanding Actress in a Play), Outer Critics Circle Award
