= Jack Koenig =

American actor

Jack Koenig (born May 14, 1959, in Rockville Centre, New York) is an American actor best known for his work in theatre and television. He is most familiar to audiences for playing Michael Conway on Sex and The City, Dr. Levin in The Blacklist, Ronald Danzer in Gotham, Defense Attorney Swift in Law & Order, and Grant Ward in Madoff. For his work in the Off-Broadway production Tabletop, he was awarded the 2001 Drama Desk Award for Outstanding Ensemble Performance.

== Early life ==
Born in Rockville Centre and raised in Baldwin, New York, Koenig attended Columbia University where he majored in English because the university did not offer an undergraduate degree in theatre at the time. Nevertheless, he studied with Estelle Parsons and Robert Neff Williams, whom Koenig credits as the best teacher he ever had. While enrolled at Columbia, he starred in the school's production of Macbeth as the eponymous character and as The Boy in The Fantasticks through a special arrangement with the Off-Broadway production which was then in its 17th year.

== Career ==
After graduating, Koenig began his acting career performing in regional theatre, appearing in Philocetetes at Delaware Theatre Company, A Quiet End with Jack Kenny at The Repertory Theatre of St. Louis, Rough Crossing – Tom Stoppard's adaptation of Ferenc Molnár's The Play's The Thing – at Westport Country Playhouse, and as a member of the first season of Michael Kahn's The Shakespeare Theatre in Mandragola. The following year he appeared in Julie Taymor's production of Taming of the Shrew for Theatre for a New Audience at North Shore Music Theatre, an episode of Monsters, and won three episodes of Jeopardy!.

Continuing to work Off-Broadway through the 1990s, he performed in a variety of productions including Grand Finale at Ubu Repertory Theatre, Herb Gardner's I'm With Ya Duke with David Margulies at Ensemble Studio Theatre, The Voysey Inheritance at The Mint, Misalliance and Cymbeline at Pearl Theatre, and John Guare's Marco Polo Sings a Solo with Bruce Norris and Polly Holliday at Signature Theatre Company, co-starred in My Girlfriend's Boyfriend with Deborah Gibson, Chris Bruno, and Valerie Perrine, appeared in I.Q. and The Proprietor, and guest-starred across television on Law & Order, The Cosby Mysteries, Now and Again, Sex and The City, and As The World Turns. Koenig's career began to kick off after winning the 2001 Drama Desk Award for Rob Ackerman's hit play, Tabletop, which was met with unanimous critical praise. Soon afterwards he appeared at Manhattan Theatre Club in Cary Churchill's Mad Forest and Richard Greenberg's The American Plan and Three Days of Rain – with Patricia Clarkson, John Slattery, and Bradley Whitford – in Richard Greenberg's Everett Beekin and A.R. Gurney's Big Bill at Lincoln Center, and as the young Charles Carrol in National Treasure.

The following year he made his Broadway premiere in The Lion King as Scar. His theatre work continued with acclaimed original runs in Dan Dietz's Clementine in the Lower 9, The Flag Maker of Market Street and Blood Divided at Alabama Shakespeare Festival, in revivals of David Mamet's Race, A Moon for the Misbegotten at Virginia Stage Company, Absurd Person Singular, The Christmas Story, Laughing Stock, A Doll's House, Heartbreak House, The Seagull, An Inspector Calls, Present Laughter, and a return to the Shakespeare Theatre to work with Michael Kahn again, 32 years after his debut, in Harold Pinter's The Collection. Off-Broadway his work has continued with The Actors Company Theatre in The Cocktail Party and Incident at Vichy, in staged readings at The Players Club with David Staller's Gingold Theatrical Group in The Apple Cart, Saint Joan, Caesar and Cleopatra, and In Good King Charles' Golden Days, in Perfect Crime with Catherine Russell, and in A.R. Gurney's The Grand Manner with Kate Burton at the Mitzi Newhouse Theatre. On Broadway he has performed in the Tony Award-winning play Oslo directed by Bartlett Sher, Accent on Youth with David Hyde Pierce, and The Pitmen Painters. Recently he joined the cast of Harry Potter and the Cursed Child; Parts One and Two on Broadway at The Lyric Theatre.

Koenig's television guest appearances have increased to include Law & Order as the recurring character Defense Attorney Swift, Law & Order SVU, and Law & Order: Criminal Intent, The Good Wife, Zero Hour, Forever, Unforgettable, Boardwalk Empire, Madoff, Power, Pose, Gotham, and The Blacklist.

== Personal life ==
Koenig has two children, a daughter and son. He lives in Manhattan.

== Filmography ==
=== Film ===
Year	Title	Role	Notes
1994	I.Q.	First Reporter	
1996	The Proprietor	Apartment Doorman	
1999	My Girlfriend's Boyfriend	Wes	
2003	Marci X	Reporter	
2010	Ceremony	Party Guest No. 5	
2021	Clean	Priest	

=== Television ===
Year	Title	Role	Notes
1988	Monsters	Jack Avery	Episode: "The Vampire Hunter"
1994	The Cosby Mysteries	Richard Blume	Episode: "Only You"
1998	Sex and the City	Michael Conway	Episode: "The Monogamists"
1998–2006	Law & Order	Various roles	4 episodes
1999	Now and Again	Government Agent No. 2	Episode: "Over Easy"
1999–2010	As the World Turns	Dr. Ripley / Sheriff Dooley	3 episodes
2001	The Education of Max Bickford	Steve Bettis	Episode: "Herding Cats"
2002, 2006	Law & Order: Criminal Intent	Attorney Javits / Ron Sherwood	2 episodes
2005	Law & Order: SVU	Edgar Hamill	Episode: "Alien"
2012	The Good Wife	Arnold Wyatt	Episode: "A Defense of Marriage"
2013	Zero Hour	SS Officer	Episode: "Chain"
2014	Gotham	Ronald Danzer	Episode: "The Balloonman"
2014	Boardwalk Empire	Agent No. 6	Episode: "Eldorado"
2014, 2015	Forever	Captain	2 episodes
2015	The Blacklist	Dr. Levin	3 episodes
2016	Unforgettable	Brian Fenton	Episode: "Paranoid Android"
2016	Madoff	Grant Ward	4 episodes
2017	Power	Marvin Miller	Episode: "Things Are Going to Get Worse"
2018	Pose	Joe Bockol	Episode: "Pink Slip"
