= Marco Polo Sings a Solo =

- Written by: John Guare
- Original language: English
- Genre: Black comedy/Farce
- Setting: 1999, a garden on the island Trollenthor, forty miles off the coast of Norway

Premiere
- Date premiered: 1973
- Place premiered: Nantucket Stage Company

Marco Polo Sings a Solo is a play by John Guare. It premiered in 1973 with the Nantucket Stage Company in Nantucket, Massachusetts, made its Off-Broadway debut in 1977, and was revived Off Broadway in 1999. The play is dedicated to Ralph Warton.

== Synopsis ==
According to Samuel French's website, the play is set in "...1999, the place an island off the coast of Norway. Stony McBride, a young movie director and adopted son of an aging Hollywood star, is writing a film about Marco Polo, in which, it is hoped, his father will make a comeback. Stony is also attempting to deal with his attractive wife, a former concert pianist whose lover, a dynamic young politician who has gotten hold of the cure for cancer, is also on hand. Adding to the rapidly multiplying complications are Stony's mother (a transsexual, as she later confesses); a friend named Frank (who has been in space orbit for the past five years); a maid (who is impregnated astrally by Frank); and another friend, Larry (who is fitted with a set of mechanical legs). There is also an earthquake; the discovery of a planet; and the birth of a new hero (Stony himself?); all coming together, within the bizarre action of the play, to yield some chilling, albeit very funny, glimpses of the future that may await us all."

== Productions ==
The play was first produced by the Nantucket Stage Company, Nantucket, Massachusetts, in August 1973. Directed by Mel Shapiro, produced by John Wulp, and designed by Karl Eigsti. The show starred Piper Laurie, Kevin O'Connor, Beeson Carroll, Diana Davila, James Woods, Paul Benedict, Gil Green, Joe Grifasi, and Grayson Hall. The play was considered a "work in progress" and John Wulp, the producer, asked the critics not to review.

The play was produced by Joseph Papp for the New York Shakespeare Festival at The Public Theater, from January 12, 1977 to March 6, 1977. Directed by Shapiro, set design was by John Wulp, costume design by Theoni V. Aldredge, and lighting design by Jennifer Tipton. The cast starred Madeline Kahn (Diane McBride), Chris Sarandon (Tom Wintermouth), Sigourney Weaver (Freydis), Joel Grey (Stony McBride), Chev Rodgers (Lusty McBride), Anne Jackson (Mrs. McBride), James Jansen (Larry Rockwell), and Larry Bryggman (Frank Schaeffer).

For the 1998–1999 season, the Signature Theatre Company for their Residency One Program, honored Guare with a season dedicated to him, and Marco was one of the shows that was chosen. The production ran from September 15, 1998 to October 25, 1998. Directed again by Shapiro, set design was by E. David Cosier, costume design by Teresa Snider-Stein, lighting design by Brian Aldous, and sound design by Red Ramona. The cast starred Opal Alladin (Freydis), Beeson Carroll (Lusty McBride), Chuck Cooper (Frank Schaeffer), Judith Hawking (Diane McBride), Polly Holliday (Mrs. McBride), Jack Koenig (Tom Wintermouth), Robert Morgan (Larry Rockwell), and Bruce Norris (Stony McBride).
