= Harvey Wang =

American photographer

Harvey Wang is an American photographer based in New York City. He has published several books of photography. He is known for his portraits and short films.

== Life and career ==
Harvey Wang was born in Queens, New York, in 1956. He received a Bachelor of Arts degree in Anthropology from Purchase College, State University of New York in 1977. He visited Madison County, North Carolina to conduct research and take photographs for his honors thesis "At the Crossroads," which explored the impact of popular culture on the folk culture of the area. His photographs were subsequently shown in the exhibition At the Crossroads: Music and Photographs from Madison County, North Carolina at the Neuberger Museum at Purchase College in 1977.

After graduation, he worked as a photographer for the Village Voice under picture editor Fred W. McDarrah. In 2019, Wang joined a panel of former Village Voice photojournalists Amy Arbus, James Hamilton, and Sylvia Plachy at the Museum of the City of New York for a discussion moderated by Vince Aletti, which coincided with the exhibition The Voice of the Village: Fred W. McDarrah Photographs.

In the early 1980s, Wang frequented and photographed Club 57, a nightclub on St. Mark’s Place in the East Village, New York City that served as a mecca for filmmakers, artists, and musicians. His photographs of Club 57 regulars included Anne Magnuson, John "Lypsinka" Epperson, Kai Eric, Tseng Kwong Chi, Dany Johnson, Charlotte Slivka, Tom Scully, Klaus Nomi, Wendy Wild, John Sex, Deb O'Nair, Keith Haring, James Chance, Pat Place, Anya Phillips, and others. These photographs were included in the exhibition Club 57: Film, Performance, and Art in the East Village, 1978-1983 at the Museum of Modern Art, New York in 2017. He photographed the Lower East Side, Chinatown, and the East Village in New York City extensively in the 1970s and 1980s. A selection of his photographs were exhibited at P.S. 1 in the New York/New Wave exhibition in New York City in 1981.

In 1983 he worked with author Edward Kiersh on Where Have You Gone, Vince DiMaggio?, a book about retired Major League baseball players. Subjects included Vince DiMaggio, Ernie Banks, Roger Maris, Harmon Killebrew, Gene Woodling, Harvey Haddix, Willie McCovey, Pumpsie Green, and Dusty Rhodes. Wang's photographs of these players appeared in a solo exhibition at the New York Public Library (New York City) in 1983.

In 1986, Wang photographed the subjects of Victoria Balfour's book Rock Wives, a collection of interviews with eighteen people who have lived with and around stars of rock and roll. Subjects included Susan Rotolo, Claudette Robinson, Angie Bowie, Ingrid Croce, Bebe Buell, and Carlene Carter.

His portraits of older New Yorkers whose occupations and ways of life were being threatened by change were published in Harvey Wang’s New York in 1990, and exhibited in a solo exhibition at the Museum of the City of New York in 1992. Subjects included Ella Baker, a civil rights activist; Eddie Day, the Cyclone rollercoaster brakeman at Coney Island, Brooklyn; Joey Faye, a burlesque comedian; Tom Rella, a gravedigger at the Bayside Cemetery in Queens; Aston Robinson, a waiter at Gage and Tollner in Brooklyn; Helen Giamanco, the longest-working employee at Horn & Hardart in New York City; Edward Robb Ellis, the writer of one of the longest diaries in the world; Editta Sherman, the “Duchess of Carnegie Hall” and portrait photographer; and Benesh Horowitz, a typesetter at The Forward. In 2021, Harvey Wang's New York was listed as one of the top 10 books about New York City by The Guardian. Wang revisited Harvey Wang's New York in 2024 with a solo exhibition at the Yiddish Book Center in Amherst, Massachusetts.

In the early 1990s, Wang teamed up with radio producer David Isay. Over a period of several years, they traveled across the country together to interview and photograph interesting Americans. The interview excerpts and portraits were published in 1995 in Holding On: Dreamers, Visionaries, Eccentrics and Other American Heroes.

Photographs drawn from Harvey Wang’s New York and Holding On were the basis for the solo exhibition Going Strong: Older Americans on the Job at the National Museum of American History at the Smithsonian Institution in Washington, DC in 1995. These portraits showed older Americans still working proudly at their lifelong professions. The show subsequently traveled as part of the Smithsonian Institution Traveling Exhibition Service (SITES) program.

In 2000, Wang photographed the residents of the last remaining flophouses on New York City’s Bowery for the book Flophouse: Life on the Bowery, a collaboration with radio producers David Isay and Stacy Abramson. The project culminated in an exhibition at the New-York Historical Society in 2001.

In the early 2000s, Wang began to explore the craft of photography and the careers of other photographers. His short film about Milton Rogovin, Milton Rogovin: The Forgotten Ones, won the prize for Best Documentary Short at the Tribeca Film Festival in 2003. In the film, Wang accompanies Milton and Anne Rogovin as they shoot the final portraits in their “Quartets” series on Buffalo, New York’s Lower West Side. Wang also wrote an afterword for the book Milton Rogovin: The Forgotten Ones.

Wang directed a feature film in 2007, The Last New Yorker, featuring Dominic Chianese, Dick Latessa, and Kathleen Chalfant.

Starting in 2008, Wang began to explore how photographers were affected by the momentous change in photography in the wake of the transition from film to digital methods. The book of interviews and portraits, titled From Darkroom to Daylight, was published in 2015. A documentary film of the same name screened at photography festivals, museums, colleges, and other public venues. Subjects included Jerome Liebling, George Tice, Elliott Erwitt, David Goldblatt, Sally Mann, Gregory Crewdson, Susan Meiselas, Eugene Richards, Steven Sasson, who built the first digital camera at Kodak, and Thomas Knoll, who alongside his brother created Photoshop.

The Bronx Documentary Center presented a retrospective of Wang's photography in 2026 in an exhibition titled WANG’S WORLD: Photographs and Films of Harvey Wang.

== Selected publications ==
- From Darkroom to Daylight. (Daylight Books, 2015) Interviews and photographs by Harvey Wang. Edited by Amy Brost and Edmund Carson. ISBN 978-0989798181
- Milton Rogovin: The Forgotten Ones. (Quantuck Lane Press, 2003) Text by David Isay, David Miller and Harvey Wang. Photographs by Milton Rogovin. ISBN 978-0971454859
- Flophouse: Life on the Bowery. (Random House, 2000) Text by David Isay and Stacy Abramson. Photographs by Harvey Wang. ISBN 978-0375503221 (hardcover) ISBN 978-0375758317 (trade paperback)
- Holding On: Dreamers, Visionaries, Eccentrics and other American Heroes. (W.W. Norton & Company, 1995) Text by David Isay and Harvey Wang. Photographs by Harvey Wang. Foreword by Henry Roth. ISBN 978-0393037548 (hardcover) ISBN 978-0393316087 (paperback)
- Harvey Wang’s New York. (W.W. Norton & Company, 1990) Text and photographs by Harvey Wang. Foreword by Pete Hamill. ISBN 978-0393029147 (hardcover) ISBN 978-0393306927 (paperback)
- Rock Wives: The Hard Lives and Good Times of the Wives, Girlfriends, and Groupies of Rock and Roll. (William Morrow & Company, 1986) By Victoria Balfour with photographs by Harvey Wang. ISBN 978-0688043865 (hardcover) ISBN 978-0688069667 (paperback)
- Where Have You Gone, Vince DiMaggio? (Bantam Books, 1983) By Edward Kiersh with photographs by Harvey Wang. ISBN 978-0553231311

== Recognition ==
=== Awards ===
- 2007: The Last New Yorker was awarded the Cityscape Award at the Big Apple Film Festival and the Audience and Seahorse Awards at the Moondance International Film Festival.
- 2005-06: Milton Rogovin: The Forgotten Ones won Best Short Documentary at the International Festival of Cinema and Technology.
- 2004: Triptych was chosen as Best Experimental Film at the Rhode Island International Film Festival.
- 2004: Henley Royal Regatta was the Director’s Choice at the Black Maria Film Festival.
- 2003: Milton Rogovin: The Forgotten Ones won the prize for Best Documentary Short at the Tribeca Film Festival and the top prize at The One Show Film Festival.
- 1996: “Indian Cinema” segment, City Arts, Thirteen/WNET, winner, New York Emmy
- 1995: “Julius Knipl” segment on Ben Katchor and his comic strip Julius Knipl: Real Estate Photographer; City Arts, Thirteen/WNET, nominee, New York Emmy.
- 1995: “Show #203,” City Arts, Thirteen/WNET, nominee, New York Emmy. Segment “Haitian Music” by Harvey Wang.
