= Bosoms and Neglect =

Play written by John Guare

- Original language: English
- Written by: John Guare
- Genre: Black comedy
- Setting: Henny's apartment, Deirdre's apartment, and Henny's hospital room.

Premiere
- Date: 1979
- Place: Goodman Theatre; Chicago, Illinois

Bosoms and Neglect is a play by American playwright John Guare, first staged in 1979 at the Goodman Theatre in Chicago, Illinois.

== Productions ==
Bosoms and Neglect opened on Broadway at the Longacre Theatre on May 3, 1979, where it ran for 4 performances. Direction was by Mel Shapiro, scenery by John Wulp, and costumes by Willa Kim. The cast included Kate Reid (Henny), Paul Rudd (Scooper), and Marian Mercer (Deirdre). For her performance, Kate Reid was nominated for the Drama Desk Award for Outstanding Actress in a Play.

The play had premiered in a limited engagement at the Goodman Theatre in Chicago, Illinois, that opened on March 1, 1979.

A revised version was presented at the New York Theatre Workshop on March 26, 1986. Directed by Larry Arrick, the cast starred Anne Meara (henny), Richard Cavanaugh, and April Shawhan.

The play opened Off-Broadway, produced by the Signature Theatre Company at The Peter Norton Space on December 1, 1998 and closed on January 10, 1999. The play was directed by Nicholas Martin, with fight director Rick Sordelet, set design by James Noone, costume design by Gail Brassard, lighting design by Frances Aaronson, and sound design by Red Ramona. The cast starred David Aaron Baker (Scooper), Katie Finneran (Deidre), and Mary Louise Wilson (Henny). The production was nominated for the Drama Desk Award for Outstanding Revival of a Play.

== Reception ==
In its original form, the play's prologue was a dialog between Henny, an aged, ailing mother whose breast cancer is referenced in the play's title, and Scooper, her son; the first act involved Scooper and Deirdre, a girl who is another patient of Scooper's psychiatrist; and the second act focused again mainly on Henny and Scooper. This segmented structure, and the play's rapid shifts between comedy and suffering, were not successful with early critics and audiences.

Although the play had received positive reviews in its March 1979 tryout in Chicago, the initial New York production was not well received and closed after only four performances. John Simon wrote in New York that the play was the latest in a "series of unconsideredly churned-out catastrophes" that Guare had written after his early success. Simon characterized the play as having "three levels that stubbornly refuse to bend, and are not worth much individually either." Richard Eder of The New York Times had a similar opinion: "John Guare, whose recent plays contained a real allure in their crevices, has missed out completely this time. The crags of 'Bosoms and Neglect' show the geological markings of nothing much besides lead."

Despite its failure on Broadway, the play soon received other productions, which met with more positive results and, over time, led to a re-evaluation of the play's position among Guare's works. Mel Gussow of The New York Times wrote that the Yale Repertory Theater's "minimally revised" October 1979 production was "far better than the Broadway production"; although he still thought the play had "basic dramatic flaws", the new production humanized the characters (especially Henny) and offered "a clearer picture of the play's possibilities and the playwright's intentions." Gussow also reviewed a 1986 Off-Broadway production at the Perry Street Theatre and found that "the play has kept its assets and its flaws intact"; he thought that the play's structure "still seems like two disparate one-act dialogues sewn together to make up a full-length play" but that "it is more interesting than many other current plays" and that Anne Meara's performance as Henny "reaches to the heart of the mother, offering a portrait of a woman flailing for life support."

The 1998 Signature Theatre Company production (which revised the structure to integrate the prologue into the first act) also met with critical approval. The New York Post's Donald Lyons called it a "triumph", while Vincent Canby in the Times thought "Mary Louise Wilson's performance as the old lady" was "viciously articulate", and he characterized the play as "a way station between the playwright's first major work, The House of Blue Leaves (1971), and his last hit, Six Degrees of Separation (1990)." Later writers about Guare have called Bosoms and Neglect a "finely balanced work which moves from wild comedy . . . to a beautifully modulated second act" and "one of Guare's best plays".

Playwright Paula Vogel called Bosoms "one of the more influential and devastating experiences in her years of going to the theatre" (In a 1997 interview with Playbill On Line).
