= Inger McCabe Elliott =

Norwegian-born American businesswoman (1933–2024)

- Born: Inger Abrahamsen; February 23, 1933; Oslo, Norway
- Died: January 29, 2024 (aged 90); New York City, U.S.
- Spouses: Robert McCabe (divorced) Osborn Elliott (m. 1973; died 2008)

Inger McCabe Elliott (February 23, 1933 – January 29, 2024) was a Norwegian-born American businesswoman, photographer, artist, and socialite. She was the founder of China Seas, Inc., a textile company.

A fictionalized version of her life involving the 1983 encounter she had with con artist David Hampton was chronicled in the film Six Degrees of Separation, in which she was portrayed by Stockard Channing, who was nominated for the Academy Award for Best Actress for her performance.

== Early life ==
Inger McCabe Elliott was born in Norway, the daughter of Lova (née Katz, d. 1966) and David Abrahamsen (1903–2002). She has a younger sister, Anne-Marie (Abrahamsen) Foltz. Elliott came to the United States with her family in 1941 and became a citizen in 1946. Her father was a prominent psychoanalyst who became blacklisted during World War II and the family was forced to leave the country. Her family was Jewish and from one of the oldest and most prominent Jewish families in Norway. In 1954 she graduated from Cornell University with a degree in History. She earned her master's degree at Radcliffe College in 1957 and did post-graduate work at Harvard.

== Career ==
Elliott worked as a teacher after finishing school, and then worked for the Eastern European Student and Youth Service. She next became a photographer for Rapho Guillumette, traveling around the world and living in Hong Kong during the 1960s, when her pictures appeared in magazines like Vogue. In 1972, she created her own textile business, China Seas, Inc, specializing in Batik fabrics from Indonesia. She was the owner of several patents with her business partner Helena Uglow. The company became successful, catering to prominent fashion designers and celebrities including Jackie Kennedy. Elliott was a founding member of The Committee of 200, and joined the American Women's Economic Development Corporation. She was also a member of the American Society of Media Photographers and the Citizens Committee for New York City.

Elliott donated her personal collection of fabrics to the Los Angeles County Museum of Art. She is the author of several books on fabrics and design, and has also published her photography in the series "Henry's World" and "Amy's World". She has worked as a consultant on art and culture for institutions like Sotheby's. Elliott was a member of the New York City Council on Foreign Relations, and a trustee for the American Scandinavian Foundation. Elliott served as a trustee emeritus for the Asia Society.

== Personal life ==
With her first husband, Robert McCabe, she had three children, Marit, Kari, and Alexander McCabe. The couple adopted two refugee children from China together. They divorced and she married Osborn Elliott in 1973. Her second husband was the editor of Newsweek and the former Dean for the Columbia University Graduate School of Journalism. She was step-mother to his three children from a previous marriage, Diana, Cynthia, and Dorinda Elliott.

Inger Elliott died from cardiac arrest in Manhattan, on January 29, 2024, at the age of 90.

== David Hampton ==
Inger Elliott made national headlines after she became a victim of the conman and robber David Hampton. In October 1983, Hampton came to the Elliott's New York apartment saying he was the son of Sidney Poitier and a friend of her daughter Marit, and needed a place to stay. She allowed him to stay in their home, and the next morning she found him in bed with another man. He was kicked out of the house and she later called the police and had him arrested. After Hampton was released from jail he continued to harass Elliott, upset that the story had gotten so much attention, saying she should not have called the police. She told her close friend John Guare, a writer, about her experiences with Hampton, and Guare wrote a play based on the story titled Six Degrees of Separation, which premiered on Broadway in 1990 and was later turned into a 1993 feature film of the same name. In both the play and film, actress Stockard Channing portrayed a fictionalized version of Elliott named "Ouisa Kittredge". Channing was nominated for a Tony Award and the Academy Award for Best Actress for her performance.
