= My Girlfriend's Boyfriend (1998 film) =

1998 American screwball comedy by Kenneth Schapiro

- Directed by: Kenneth Schapiro
- Written by: Kenneth Schapiro
- Produced by: Kenneth Schapiro; Evan Seplow; L. Cyre Rodriguez (associate producer)
- Starring: Deborah Gibson; Sean Runnette; Jill Novick; Valerie Perrine; Chris Bruno; Linda Larkin; Jack Koenig
- Cinematography: T. W. Li
- Edited by: Evan Seplow
- Music by: Deborah Gibson
- Release date: 1998
- Country: United States
- Language: English

My Girlfriend's Boyfriend is an American 1998 screwball comedy film written and directed by Kenneth Schapiro, with singer-songwriter Deborah Gibson as the top-billed star. It was filmed on Long Island.

== Plot ==
Gay soap actor Cliff (Chris Bruno) is about to marry an unsuspecting girl (Linda Larkin) for the sake of his image, to the chagrin of his boyfriend Wes (Jack Koenig). However, a prowling reporter (Deborah Gibson) has some interesting photographs which could cause general consternation.

The main romance is between the reporter Melissa and the maid of honor's uncoordinated date Jake (Sean Runnette).

== Cast ==
Actor	Role
Deborah Gibson	Melissa Stevens
Sean Runnette	Jake
Jill Novick	Liberty, the maid of honor
Valerie Perrine	Rita Lindross
Chris Bruno	Cliff, the groom
Linda Larkin	Cory Lindross, the bride
Jack Koenig	Wes, the best man

== Music ==
Singer-songwriter Deborah Gibson sang the theme tune.
