= David Hampton =

American con-artist, imposter (1964–2003)

- Mug shot of David Hampton taken after he was arrested for attempted burglary
- Born: April 28, 1964; Buffalo, New York, U.S.
- Died: July 18, 2003 (aged 39); Beth Israel Medical Center; Manhattan, New York City, U.S.
- Other names: David Poitier, Patrick Owens, Antonio Jones, David Hampton-Montilio
- Status: Deceased
- Conviction: Attempted burglary
- Criminal charges: Fraud, fare-beating, credit-card theft, threats of violence, burglary, harassment
- Penalty: Twenty-one month prison term

David Hampton (April 28, 1964 – July 18, 2003) was an American con artist and robber who became famous in the 1980s after he convinced a group of wealthy Manhattanites to give him money, food, and shelter under the pretense that he was the son of Sidney Poitier. David Hampton's story became the inspiration for a play titled Six Degrees of Separation, which was adapted for a film of the same name. David Hampton died of AIDS-related complications in 2003.

== Background ==
Hampton was born in Buffalo, New York, and was the eldest son of an attorney. He moved to New York City in 1981 and stumbled upon his now-famous ruse in 1983 when he and another man were attempting to gain entry into Studio 54. After the club denied Hampton and his partner entry, Hampton's partner decided to pose as Gregory Peck's son while Hampton assumed the identity of Sidney Poitier's son. They were ushered in as celebrities. Thereafter, Hampton adopted the persona of "David Poitier" to obtain free meals in restaurants. He also persuaded at least a dozen well-off people to give him shelter and money, including Melanie Griffith, Gary Sinise, Calvin Klein, John Jay Iselin, the president of WNET; Osborn Elliott, the dean of the Columbia University Graduate School of Journalism; Leonard Bernstein, and a Manhattan urologist. Hampton used different lies to fool his victims; he convinced some that he was an acquaintance of their children, some that he had just missed a plane to Los Angeles with his luggage still on it, and some that his belongings had been stolen in a mugging.

In October 1983, Hampton was arrested and convicted of fraud and ordered to pay restitution of $4,469 to his various victims. After refusing to comply with these terms, he was sentenced to a term of 18 months to four years in prison.

== Six Degrees of Separation ==
Playwright John Guare became interested in Hampton's story through his friendship with Inger McCabe Elliott and Osborn Elliott, who had been outraged to find "David Poitier" in bed with another man the morning after they let him into their home. Six Degrees of Separation opened at the Lincoln Center in May 1990 and became a long-running success.

Hampton attempted to parlay the play's success to his benefit, giving interviews to the press, gate-crashing a producer's party, and beginning a campaign of harassment against Guare that included phone calls and death threats. The harassment campaign prompted Guare to apply for a restraining order in April 1991. The restraining order was denied. In the fall of 1991, Hampton filed a $100 million lawsuit, claiming that the play had infringed on the copyright on his persona and his story. The lawsuit was eventually dismissed.

== Death ==
David Hampton died of AIDS-related complications while being treated for his illness at Beth Israel Medical Center (BIMC) in Manhattan.

== See also ==
- Alan Conway, a con-artist with a similar modus operandi
