= Dick Latessa =

American actor (1929–2016)

- Latessa in 1981
- Born: Richard Robert Latessa; September 15, 1929; Cleveland, Ohio, U.S.
- Died: December 19, 2016 (aged 87); New York City, U.S.
- Resting place: Lake View Cemetery
- Occupation: Actor
- Years active: 1968–2016
- Notable credits: The Education of H*Y*M*A*N K*A*P*L*A*N; Hairspray; Promises, Promises
- Awards: Tony Award (2003); Drama Desk Award (2003)

Richard Robert Latessa (September 15, 1929 – December 19, 2016) was an American stage, film, and television actor.

== Early life ==
Latessa was born in Cleveland, Ohio, in 1929. After serving in the Army in maybe 1952, he began performing in Cleveland before moving to New York in 1959 to pursue acting professionally.

== Stage career ==
He made his Broadway debut in The Education of H*Y*M*A*N K*A*P*L*A*N in 1968. His subsequent theatre credits include Follies, Rags, The Cherry Orchard, Damn Yankees, A Funny Thing Happened on the Way to the Forum, Awake and Sing!, Cabaret, The Will Rogers Follies and Hairspray, for which he won both the Tony- and Drama Desk awards for Best Featured Actor in a Musical. In 2012, he appeared opposite Linda Lavin in the Nicky Silver drama, The Lyons.

Latessa was featured in several Neil Simon plays, including Chapter Two, I Ought to Be in Pictures, Brighton Beach Memoirs, Broadway Bound, Rumors and Proposals. He was featured in the 2010 revival of the Burt Bacharach and Hal David musical, Promises, Promises as Dr. Dreyfuss.

== Film and television career ==
Latessa's screen credits include The Substance of Fire, Alfie, and Stigmata. He appeared in numerous television movies, including Izzy and Moe, The Trial of Bernhard Goetz, and Pudd'nhead Wilson, and such primetime series as Get Smart, Mission: Impossible, Ironside, Spenser: For Hire, The Sopranos, Ed, and Law & Order. He is widely known as the second and most recognized actor to play Noel Douglas on The Edge of Night. He later played Neil Hayes on One Life to Live.

== Death ==
Latessa died on December 19, 2016, of heart failure in New York City, aged 87.

== Filmography ==
Year	Title	Role	Notes
1996	The Substance of Fire	Mr. McCormack sr	
1997	Better Than Ever	Mr. Mayhew	
1999	Stigmata	Father Gianni Delmonico	
2003	The Event	Uncle Leo	
2004	Alfie	Joe	
2005	The Great New Wonderful	Jerry Binder	
2007	The Last New Yorker	Ruben	
2010	A Buddy Story	Grandpa	

=== Stage ===
Year	Title	Role	Notes
1964	Pimpernel!	1st Spy	Gramercy Theatre, Off-Broadway
1968	The Education of H*Y*M*A*N K*A*P*L*A*N	Giovanni Pastora	Alvin Theatre, Broadway
1971	Follies	Major-Domo	Winter Garden Theatre, Broadway
1975	Philemon	Cockian	Portfolio Theatre, Off-Broadway
1978	Chapter Two	George Schneider/Leo Schneider (Standby)	Imperial Theatre, Broadway
1980	I Ought to be in Pictures	Herb (Replacement)	Eugene O'Neill Theatre, Broadway
1980	Passione	Renzo	Morosco Theatre, Broadway
1983	Brighton Beach Memoirs	Jack Jerome (Replacement)	Alvin Theatre, Broadway
1983	American Kicks Up Its Heels	Boris	Playwrights Horizons, Off-Broadway
1984	Awake and Sing!	Myron Berger	Circle in the Square Theatre, Broadway
1984	Diamonds	Performer	Circle in the Square, Off-Broadway
1986	Rags	Avram Cohen	Mark Hellenger Theatre, Broadway
1986	Broadway Bound	Jack (Replacement)	Broadhurst Theatre, Broadway
1988	Rumors	Ernie Cusack (Replacement)	Broadhurst Theatre, Broadway
1991	The Will Rogers Follies	Clem Rogers	Palace Theatre, Broadway
1992	A Man in his Underwear	Daniel Shannon	Playwrights Horizons, Off-Broadway
1992	Juno	Jack Boyle	Long Wharf Theatre
1994	Damn Yankees	Van Buren	Marquis Theatre, Broadway
1996	Fit to be Tied	Carl	Playwrights Horizons, Off-Broadway
1996	A Funny Thing Happened on the Way to the Forum	Senex (Replacement)	St. James Theatre, Broadway
1997	Proposals	Burt Hines	Broadhurst Theatre, Broadway
1998	Cabaret	Herr Schultz (Replacement)	Stephen Sondheim Theatre, Broadway
2001	Chaucer in Rome	Ron	Lincoln Center Theater, Off-Broadway
2002	Hairspray	Wilbur Turnblad	Neil Simon Theatre, Broadway
2010	Promises, Promises	Dr. Dreyfuss	Broadway Theatre, Broadway
2012	The Lyons	Ben Lyons	Cort Theatre, Broadway

== Awards and nominations ==
Year	Award	Category	Work	Result
2003	Tony Award	Best Featured Actor in a Musical	Hairspray	Won
2003	Drama Desk Award	Outstanding Featured Actor in a Musical	Hairspray	Won
2003	Outer Critics Circle Award	Outstanding Featured Actor in a Musical	Hairspray	Won
2010	Outer Critics Circle Award	Outstanding Featured Actor in a Musical	Promises, Promises	Nominated
