= Six Degrees of Separation (film) =

1993 film by Fred Schepisi

- Theatrical release poster
- Directed by: Fred Schepisi
- Screenplay by: John Guare
- Based on: Six Degrees of Separation; 1990 play by John Guare
- Produced by: Fred Schepisi; Arnon Milchan
- Starring: Stockard Channing; Will Smith; Donald Sutherland; Mary Beth Hurt; Bruce Davison; Ian McKellen
- Cinematography: Ian Baker
- Edited by: Peter Honess
- Music by: Jerry Goldsmith
- Production companies: Maiden Movies; New Regency
- Distributed by: Metro-Goldwyn-Mayer
- Release date: December 8, 1993
- Running time: 112 minutes
- Country: United States
- Language: English
- Budget: $15 million
- Box office: $6.4 million

Six Degrees of Separation is a 1993 American comedy-drama film released by Metro-Goldwyn-Mayer and directed by Fred Schepisi, adapted from John Guare's Pulitzer Prize-nominated 1990 play of the same name.

The plot of the film was inspired by the real-life story of David Hampton, a con man and robber who convinced a number of people in the 1980s that he was the son of actor Sidney Poitier. In October 1983, Hampton came to the New York apartment of Inger McCabe Elliott and her husband Osborn Elliott, who allowed him to spend the night in the apartment. The next morning, Inger found Hampton in bed with another man and later called the police. The Elliotts told their friend, writer John Guare, the story, which inspired him to write the play years later.

== Plot ==
Fifth Avenue socialite Ouisa Kittredge and her art dealer husband Flan are parents of "two at Harvard and a girl at Groton." However, the narrow world inhabited by the Kittredges and their public status as people interested in the arts make them easy prey for Paul. A skillful con-artist, Paul mysteriously appears at their door one night, injured and bleeding, claiming to be a close college friend of their Ivy League kids, as well as the son of Sidney Poitier.

Ouisa and Flan are much impressed by Paul's fine taste, keen wit, articulate literary expositions and surprising culinary skill. His appealing facade fades as soon as the Kittredges put him up, lending him money and taking satisfaction in his praise for their posh lifestyle. Paul's scheme continues until, after he brings home a hustler, his actual indigence is revealed. The shocked Kittredges kick him out when it is revealed that they are but the most recent victims of the duplicity with which Paul has charmed his way into many upper-crust homes along the Upper East Side.

Paul's schemes become anecdotes which are bantered about at their cocktail parties. In the end, Paul has a profound effect on the many individuals who encounter him, linking them in their shared experience.

== Cast ==
- Stockard Channing as Louisa "Ouisa" Kittredge
- Will Smith as Paul
- Donald Sutherland as Flanders "Flan" Kittredge
- Ian McKellen as Geoffrey Miller
- Mary Beth Hurt as Kitty
- Heather Graham as Elizabeth
- Bruce Davison as Larkin
- Richard Masur as Dr. Fine
- Anthony Michael Hall as Trent Conway
- Daniel von Bargen as Detective
- Eric Thal as Rick
- Kelly Bishop as Adele
- Anthony Rapp as Ben
- Oz Perkins as Woodrow "Woody" Kittredge (as Osgood Perkins II)
- Catherine Kellner as Talbot "Tess" Kittredge
- J. J. Abrams as Doug (as Jeffrey Abrams)
- Kitty Carlisle as Mrs. Bannister
- Cleo King as Lieutenant Price

== Production ==
During the scene where Trent and Paul kissed, Smith refused to do it as he did not know what his friends would think, so a stand-in actor was used instead.

== Reception ==
On the review aggregator website Rotten Tomatoes, 88% of 34 critics' reviews are positive, with an average rating of 7.1/10. The website's consensus reads: "Though it betrays its theatrical roots, Six Degrees of Separation largely succeeds thanks to astute direction and fine performances -- particularly from an against-type Will Smith."

=== Accolades ===
- 1994 Academy Award for Best Actress Nomination – Stockard Channing
- 1994 Golden Globe Award for Best Actress – Motion Picture Musical or Comedy Nomination – Stockard Channing

== See also ==
- Six Degrees of Separation (play)
