= Rich and Famous (play) =

Play by John Guare

- Written by: John Guare
- Original language: English
- Genre: Black comedy
- Setting: Night of the first preview of Bing Ringling's new play

Premiere
- Date premiered: 1974
- Place premiered: Academy Festival Theatre; Lake Forest, Illinois

Rich and Famous is a two-act play by John Guare. It premiered in 1974 at the Academy Festival Theatre in Lake Forest, Illinois, and made its Off-Broadway debut in 1976.

== Synopsis ==
Bing Ringling is an old "promising" playwright, finally about to have a play produced—play number 844.

== Productions ==
Rich and Famous was first produced by William Gardner at the Academy Festival Theatre, in Lake Forest, Illinois, in August 1974. It was directed by Mel Shapiro and starred Charles Kimbrough, Linda Lavin, and Ron Leibman. Guare wrote the music for the play, which was performed by a small band consisting of Bass, Sax, and Woodwinds.

Rich and Famous premiered Off-Broadway at The Public Theater New York Shakespeare Festival on January 13, 1976 and closed on April 25, 1976. Directed by Mel Shapiro, set design Dan Snyder, costume design Theoni V. Aldredge, and lighting design Arden Fingerhut. The cast starred William Atherton starred as Bing Ringling, with Anita Gillette playing the "Female Parts" and Ron Leibman playing the "Male Parts".

The play was produced by the American Conservatory Theater, San Francisco, in January and February 2009. Directed by John Rando, the cast featured Brooks Ashmanskas (Bing), Mary Birdsong, Stephen DeRosa and Gregory Wallace. The reviewer for sfgate.com wrote: "Written as a vaudeville - complete with snappy, tuneful songs by Guare and musical director Laura Burton providing accompaniment on an old upright piano - 'Rich' follows the downward spiral of playwright Bing Ringling (Brooks Ashmanskas) on the opening night of the off-off-Broadway premiere ("in a toilet on Death Street") of his first produced play....The problem with these characters isn't in the over-the-top performances but in the dated quality of much of the humor, and their cumulative effect doesn't take us on much of a journey."
