= Grendel (film) =

American movie, 2007

- DVD cover
- Genre: Action; Drama; Fantasy; Horror
- Based on: Beowulf by Anonymous
- Written by: Ron Fernandez; Berkeley Anderson
- Directed by: Nick Lyon
- Starring: Chris Bruno; Ben Cross; Marina Sirtis
- Music by: Nathan Furst
- Country of origin: United States
- Original language: English

Production
- Producers: Jeffery Beach; Phillip J. Roth
- Cinematography: Lorenzo Senatore
- Editor: Matt Michael
- Running time: 82 minutes
- Production company: Universal Pictures

Original release
- Network: Sci Fi Channel
- Release: January 13, 2007

Grendel is a 2007 American action-fantasy television film directed by Nick Lyon and very loosely based on the Old English epic poem Beowulf. The television film was produced by the Sci Fi channel as an original movie for broadcasting on the Sci Fi cable television network, and began airing on January 13, 2007. In 2010 it was released on DVD from the sister company by Universal Pictures.

== Plot ==
Villagers ask a man named Beowulf to kill a monster living nearby. Together with his protégé Finn, he enters a cave. The monster turns out to be a gigantic snake, which Beowulf beheads. Later, Beowulf (armed with a crossbow that shoots missiles), Finn, his uncle King Higlack, and some men set out on his ship towards Denmark to help the Danes fighting against the monster Grendel.

On board Beowulf tells the story of King Hrothgar, who became King of the Danes and founded a city that could compete with Rome. One day a wyvern-like monster ("Hag") appeared and terrorised his kingdom. As a result, Queen Wealhþeow went mad and one of their two sons died fighting the Hag; the royal family had to leave the city and settle in one of the villages. Just before the winged monster apparently died, she gave birth to Grendel.

When they reach the beach, Beowulf and some warriors go ashore; Finn joins them, after Beowulf swore to the king that nothing will happen to him. In the forest bordering the coast they are greeted by Prince Unferð, who has already monitored their arrival with Captain Wulfgar. He allows the warriors to meet the king, albeit unarmed. King Hrothgar greets Beowulf like an old friend and is pleased with his offer of help. They move to the abandoned city to have a feast, since the noise used to attract Grendel in the past.

At the feast Ingrid, a member of the royal family, starts flirting with Finn: the two kiss watched by the jealous Unferth, who also has feelings for Ingrid. Drunk, Unferth provokes Finn and then Beowulf, whom he questions about less glorious stories and ridicules him. Hrothgar is disappointed with his son and orders him to stop his foolish behavior. After being knocked off by Beowulf in one blow, because he wanted to challenge him to a sword fight, Grendel appears in the courtyard and attacks the guards. Beowulf and his men attack the monster but Beowulf repeatedly misses it with the explosive bolts of the crossbow. Eventually the monster escapes after causing a bloodbath.

The following day, Beowulf gets Hrothgar to admit that he had been able to keep Grendel calm for the last few years through child sacrifices, as his predecessor did with Hag: this is why there are no more children on the island. Beowulf decides then to look for Grendel on his own, and order Wulfgar to bomb the forest with burning barrels, to lure Grendel out. While the rest of the group stays behind and is ambushed by Grendel, Beowulf manages to shoot it in the head with one of the bolts and then pierce his heart. As proof of his death, he takes Grendel's arm with him.

Hrothgar is delighted with the result and generously rewards the heroes. While Beowulf and his people head for the ship to return home, it becomes clear that Grendel's mother, Hag, was never dead and now wants to avenge her son. She kidnaps Ingrid, prompting the royal family to call Beowulf back; Unferth and Finn, however, take up the chase separately. Ingrid frees herself, but now walks aimlessly in the forest; Unferth protects her from Hag, but pays for it with his life. While dying, he confesses his love for Ingrid and asks her to tell his parents that he is sorry for his brother's death and that he asks for forgiveness.

When Hag returns to capture Ingrid again, Finn jumps in between them and injures the monster, but Hag abducts him. Beowulf, Wulfgar and the royal couple arrive on site and Beowulf decides to hunt Hag alone; Hrothgar then recommends him to use the sword he will find at the entrance of Hag's cave. In the vicinity of the cave, he finds the sword and then the seriously injured Finn. Hag ambushes Beowulf, whose attempts to hit the flying monster fail, and throws him against a rock. Just before Hag can give Beowulf the fatal blow, Finn shoots her in the back with the crossbow. Hag then turns to Finn but Beowulf seizes the opportunity and beheads her with the sword. He brings the head to Hrothgar as proof and carry the seriously injured Finn to the village.

Beowulf later gets on a ship heading for new adventures. Finn and Ingrid stay together and have a child: after the deaths of Grendel and Hag, peace returns.

== Cast ==
- Chris Bruno as Beowulf
- Ben Cross as King Hrothgar
- Marina Sirtis as Queen Onela
- Chuck Hittinger as Finn
- Michael J. Minor as Unferth
- Alexis Peters as Ingrid
- Atanas Srebrev as Wulfgar
- Andrey Slabakov as Eclaf
- Harry Anichkin as King Higlack
- Maxim Genchev as Olf (credited as Maxim Gentchev)
- Raicho Vasilev as Sigmund
- Ivo Simeonov as McGowin
- Ruslan Kupenov as Rafel
- Assen Blatechki as Renn
- Todor Chapkanov as Sentry
- Vlado Mihailov as Captain (credited as Vlado Mihaylov)
- George Zlatarev as Deserter

== Reception ==
Nickolas Haydock, in the essay "Making Sacrifices" from the Beowulf on Film collection, called the film "highly derivative" and "regrettable".

On Rotten Tomatoes, the film has a poor rating of just 27% with over 100 reviews. In the Internet Movie Database, the film has a rating of 3.5 out of 10.0 stars with almost 1,000 votes cast.
