= The Proprietor =

- Theatrical release poster
- Directed by: Ismail Merchant
- Written by: Jean-Marie Besset; George Swift Trow
- Produced by: Humbert Balsan; Donald Rosenfeld
- Starring: Jeanne Moreau; Sean Young; Sam Waterston; Christopher Cazenove; Nell Carter; Jean-Pierre Aumont; Austin Pendleton; Charlotte de Turckheim; Pierre Vaneck; Marc Tissot; Josh Hamilton
- Cinematography: Larry Pizer
- Music by: Richard Robbins
- Production companies: Merchant Ivory Productions; Channel Four Films; Largo Entertainment; Canal+; Eurimages
- Distributed by: Warner Bros.
- Release date: 9 October 1996
- Running time: 117 minutes
- Countries: United States; France
- Languages: English; French
- Budget: $5 million

The Proprietor is a 1996 film. It is a U.S.-French co-production Merchant Ivory film, directed by Ismail Merchant for Jeanne Moreau's request.

== Cast ==
=== Starring ===
- Jeanne Moreau as Adrienne Mark
- Sean Young as Virginia Kelly
- Sam Waterston as Harry Bancroft
- Christopher Cazenove as Elliott Spencer
- Nell Carter as Millie Jackson
- Jean-Pierre Aumont as Franz Legendre
- Austin Pendleton as Willy Kunst
- Charlotte de Turckheim as Judith Mark
- Pierre Vaneck as Raymond T.K
- Marc Tissot as Patrice Legendre
- Josh Hamilton as William O'Hara

=== New York ===
- Joanna Adler as F. Freemder
- James Naughton as Texans
- J. Smith-Cameron as Texans
- Michael Bergin as Bobby
- John Dalton as Emilio
- Jack Koenig as Apartment Doorman
- Panther as Guardian Angels
- Bull as Guardian Angels
- Kim Gilmore as Guardian Angels
- Falcon as Guardian Angels
- Joan Audiberti as French Ladies
- Katherine Argo as French Ladies
- Judy Alanna as Woman in Park

=== Paris ===
- Hubert St. Macary - Taxi Driver
- Diane Nignan - Pedestrian
- Guillemette Grobon - Suzanne T.K

=== The Apartment ===
- Cherif Ezzeldin as French Couple
- Valérie Tolédano as French Couple
- Jorg Schnass as German Couple
- Paula Klein as German Couple
- Suzanna Pattoni asConcierge

=== The Auction ===
- Alain Rimoux as Noraire
- Humbert Balsan as Maître Vicks
- Donald Rosenfeld as Maître Ertaud

=== French Television ===
- Franck de la Personne as TV Moderator
- Gilles Arbona as Politician
- Henri Garcin as Interviewer
- Jeanne-Marie Darblay as Journalist

=== Cannes ===
- Kathryn Kinley as Entertainment Tonight presenter

=== Paris 1943, Maison Madeleine ===
- Marjolaine DeGraeve as Young Adrienne
- Carole Franck as Shop Assistants
- Azmine Jaffer as Shop Assistants
- Brigitte Catillon as Aristocratic Lady

=== Maxims Restaurant ===
- Jean-Yves Dubois as Fan-Fan
- Hervé Briaux as Aristocratic Man

=== Girl in the Nightclub ===
- Sophie Camus as Girl in the Nightclub

=== 'Je m'appelle France' ===
- Éric Ruf as Theodore
- Élodie Bouchez as Young Girl
- Judith Rémy sa Nadine

=== 'Call me French' ===
- Sean Young as Sally
- Wade Childress as Ben
- Thomas Tomazewski as Franck
