= A Quiet End =

1985 play by Robin Swados

- Original language: English
- Written by: Robin Swados
- Subject: AIDS
- Genre: Drama

Premiere
- Date: 1985
- Place: International City Theater; Long Beach, California

A Quiet End is a 1985 play written by American author Robin Swados (born 1953). It explores the lives of three gay men, all suffering from HIV/AIDS, who share an apartment on Manhattan's Upper West Side. A Quiet End was one of the first plays to address the AIDS epidemic, receiving productions both in the U.S. and internationally, and is widely considered "groundbreaking"

Unlike its contemporary, The Normal Heart, A Quiet End makes no mention of the politics that dominated the AIDS epidemic during this time period, particularly the lack of government response and funding in New York City. The script goes so far as to omit the words "HIV" or "AIDS", though the disease is heavily implied throughout.

The play premiered as the inaugural production of the International City Theater in Long Beach, California, and made its international debut four weeks later at the Offstage Theater in London.

A Quiet End has been produced at numerous theaters including the Repertory Theater of St. Louis, the American Repertory Theater (Amsterdam), Theater-off-Park (New York), as well as two revivals in Los Angeles and another in New York, according to playwright Swados.

== Synopsis ==
=== Act One ===
A Quiet End opens in a run-down apartment on Manhattan's Upper West Side, where Tony and Max are playing Scrabble. While waiting for Tony to take his turn, Max complains about the dismal apartment furniture and takes his HIV/AIDS medication. Billy arrives home from grocery shopping and reminisces that while he used to run "three, maybe four miles a day", he is now so exhausted that he can barely make it up the stairs.

Billy and Max talk about the apartment. While Billy is grateful for a place to live, Max bitterly grumbles about the view and the hideous furniture. When a stray comment by Max brings on the revelation that Billy and Tony were raised Catholic, the discussion transitions into a debate over the existence of God. Despite general tension between the Catholic Church and homosexuality, Tony believes wholeheartedly in God and Billy believes "sometimes". A disgusted Max professes that he believes in nothing but his individual strength and ability to survive.

Tony, after being needled and cajoled by Max and Billy, finally completes his turn in Scrabble, playing the word "punt." Both Max and Billy are incredulous that it has taken Tony so long to create such a low-scoring word. Max then turns from insulting Tony's word to Tony's past career as a football player, and the game of football in general. Tony leaves the room, hurt and angry. Max admits to Billy that the reason he dislikes athletics is because he was always picked last. Billy points out that Max is lashing out and being selfish; unlike Max, Tony wasn't "out" in high school and therefore probably had a difficult time in ways Max couldn't imagine. Max, at Billy's encouragement, leaves to reconcile with Tony.

The scene shifts to a conversation between Max and an unseen doctor. Max frustratedly admits that he hasn't felt real pleasure since he stopped teaching. The conversation with the doctor reveals that Max was fired from his teaching job because the school's administration discovered that Max was HIV-positive after Max was discovered having distributed HIV treatment resources to an infected student.

Back in the apartment, Max's ex-boyfriend Jason shows up and introduces himself to Billy. Billy divulges that he was fired from his job as a pianist because the man with whom he shared the piano became increasingly paranoid that Billy would pass the disease to him. Jason asks about life at the apartment, and Billy responds that existence is fairly unfulfilling, emotionally, sexually, and physically. Max then returns to the living room, where he and Jason catch up. Jason had not contacted Max after Max was diagnosed with HIV. Jason reveals that he is still HIV-free, but Max's relief is short-lived. The two quickly revive old arguments from their relationship, including Jason's disapproval of Max's insistence on an open relationship, and accuses Max of using group therapy to jump from solution to solution without ever taking the time to truly analyze himself. Max responds that he felt that everyone, particularly Jason, was more perfect than he was. Jason begs for Max to take him back, but Max refuses, telling Jason that his future is outside the apartment. The two kiss passionately, and Jason leaves.

=== Act Two ===
==== Scene One ====
The second act opens with a conversation between Billy and the Doctor. Billy recounts his memories of his father's death and funeral, and tells the Doctor that he has been keeping both his sexuality and diagnosis from his highly religious family. The Doctor encourages Billy to reach out to them for support, but Billy refuses because he doesn't want his "wrong choices" to hurt them as well as him. The Doctor asks Billy if he blames anyone besides himself for his illness, namely the person who infected him. Billy replies that he knows who it was, and that he forgives him.

==== Scene Two ====
Tony's health has deteriorated even further. Billy finds Tony's ripped up headshots under the couch, prompting Tony to bitterly reminisce about his lack of success in the acting business. Tony then reveals that he served in the Vietnam War before moving to New York. Billy asks if Tony has killed anyone, and after some hesitation answers yes. Tony admits to the Doctor that potentially infecting others with HIV makes him feel like a "murderer". Back at the apartment, Tony's health drastically begins to fail. He tries to prevent Billy and Max from calling an ambulance, but Max does so anyway. Before medical help arrives, Tony passes away in Billy's arms.

==== Scene Three ====
Three days later, Billy and Max discuss Tony's funeral and death in general. Billy reveals that he is moving back to Iowa to be with his family. Max begs Billy to stay, pointing out that he will be completely alone if Billy leaves. Billy tells Max that he called Jason, and implores Max to cultivate a real relationship and let Jason take him back. Billy leaves the apartment for good.

==== Scene Four ====
Jason arrives, and a fight commences. Jason argues that it doesn't matter that Max is dying, it is the way Max ends his life that is important. He implores Max to strive for more than "a quiet end", and Max responds that he can no longer feel anything. Jason then caresses Max's head and asks if Max can feel his touch. Max replies that he can. The two embrace, and Max agrees to move in with Jason.

==== Scene Five ====
The play closes with Jason reflecting upon Max's death and funeral to the Doctor. It is clear that Max lived his life to the fullest.

== Characters ==
- Tony, an aspiring actor, ex-football player, and Vietnam War veteran. HIV positive.
- Max, an intellectual, atheist, and former schoolteacher. HIV positive.
- Billy, a piano player born in Iowa and estranged from his highly religious family. HIV positive.
- Doctor, an unseen psychiatrist, all other characters are his patients
- Jason, Max's ex-partner. HIV negative

== Productions ==
(In order of premiere date)

=== International City Theatre, Long Beach, California (1986) ===
A Quiet End debuted on January 17, 1986 with direction by Jues Aaron, scenery by J.L. White, costumes by Cathy A. Crane, and lighting and sound by Mario Mariotta. The inaugural production of the International City Theatre under Shashin Desai, it set the precedent for the company's reputation of premiering new shows.

=== London (1986) ===
Presented by Buddy Dalton at the Offstage Theatre, the London production premiered on February 4, 1986. Direction by Noel Greig, scenery and costumes by Caroline Burgess, lighting by Bob Lyons.

=== Amsterdam (1986) ===
Premiering on September 17, 1986, at the American Repertory Theatre, this production was presented by Raphael Brandow, with direction by Swados himself, scenery and costumes by Ries Fess, and lighting by Nick Snaas.

=== St. Louis (1987) ===
Opening on October 30, 1987 at the St. Louis Repertory Theatre, Steven Woolf presented A Quiet End with direction by Sam Blackwell, scenery by Mel Dickerson, costumes by Jim Buff, and lighting by Mark Wilson.

=== Off-Broadway (1990) ===
Premiering May 29, 1990 at the Theatre Off Park and produced by Albert Harris in arrangement with Richard Norton and Ted Snowdon, A Quiet End made its Off-Broadway run with direction by Tony Giordano, scenery by Philipp Jung, costumes by David Murin, sound by Tony Meola, and music by Swados.

=== Los Angeles (1996) ===
Premiered at the Tracy Roberts Theatre on February 4, 1996, with direction by Anne Hulegard, sets by Frannie Smith, lighting by Brian Mahanayo

== Casting ==
(Characters listed in order of appearance)

Characters	Off-Broadway (1990)	Long Beach, California (1986)	London (1986)	Amsterdam (1986)	St. Louis (1987)	Los Angeles (1996)
Max	Lonny Price	Fred Bishop	Pete Whitman	David Swatling	Jack Kenny	Simon Harvey
Tony	Philip Coccioletti	Randolph Powell	Thom Booker	Tony Eldridge	Tony Hoylen	Rodney Van Johnson
Billy	Jordan Mott	Bruce Wieland	Zane Stanley	Steve Thomas (television)	Bruce Wieland	Edward Trucco
Doctor	Paul Milikin	David Herman	Robert F. Lyons (actor)	John Kingsbury	Joe Proctor	Jasper Cole
Jason	Rob Gomes	Thomas Jackson	Erick-Ray Evans	Michael Krass	Jack Koenig	Kurtwood Smith

== Reception ==
A Quiet End productions have received mixed reviews. At its inaugural premiere in Long Beach, the actors, lighting, and scenic design received raves. Though the play was deemed "thoughtfully written", it was ultimately declared that it was "too quiet for its own good" because it didn't deal with the political ramifications of the AIDS crisis. In the 1996 Los Angeles revivalThe Variety similarly accused Swados' script of having "little plot development", and claimed that "the responsibility for its success lies squarely on the talents of the director and actors". That being said, The Variety heaped praise upon the latter, however, particularly highlighting the direction of Anne Hulegard and Edward Trucco's performance as Billy. New York Times reviewer Stephen Price shared similar sentiments when the play debuted Off-Broadway. While the actors, set, and lighting were once again praised, particularly Lonny Price's portrayal of Max, this time the issue was a matter of direction rather than writing. Price claimed that the play's "power is severely diminished by directorial timidity", even going so far as to assert that "a drama that ought to grab one by the throat has been staged as mild-mannered, almost soothing AIDS soap opera."

== As an academic resource ==
A Quiet End has been published as a single volume by Samuel French. It also is featured in the anthology Gay and Lesbian Plays Today The Best Men's Stage Monologues of 1990, and The Best Stage Scenes for Men From the 1980s (Smith and Kraus, 1990). A Quiet End was also the focus of a chapter of Robert Vorlicky's Act Like a Man: Challenging Masculinities in American Drama (U. of Michigan Press, 1995).
