= Alabama Stage and Screen Hall of Fame =

Coordinates: 33°12′27.74″N 87°34′10.78″W

The Alabama Stage and Screen Hall of Fame was founded in 1998 for the purpose of honoring Alabamians who have made significant contributions to film, television or theatre. The organization is sponsored jointly by Theatre Tuscaloosa and Shelton State Community College in Tuscaloosa, Alabama.

== First inductees ==
The Alabama Stage and Screen Hall of Fame inducted its first class of honorees In April 1999, including the late actress Tallulah Bankhead, actress and author Fannie Flagg and philanthropists Mr. and Mrs. Winton M. Blount, who contributed over $21 million for a new home for the Alabama Shakespeare Festival.

2000 honorees included the late actress Lois Wilson, who appeared in more than 130 films from 1917 to 1965, as well as numerous Broadway and television appearances; Polly Holliday, perhaps best known for her role as "Flo" on the television show Alice, who has a long and distinguished career in movies and on stage; director John Badham, whose movie Saturday Night Fever defined the disco era; and actress / singer Nell Carter, who won a Tony Award for her performance in Ain't Misbehavin'.

== Subsequent inductees ==
The list of inductees includes: (for 2006) actor Jim Nabors; (for 2004) actress / comedian Brett Butler and actor Johnny Mack Brown; (for 2003) director / producer Tom Cherones and singer / actor Nat King Cole; (for 2002) actor George "Goober" Lindsey, actor Dean Jones, composer / lyricist Hugh Martin; (for 2001) author Truman Capote, singer / actress Rebecca Luker and the film To Kill a Mockingbird; (for 2000) actress Lois Wilson, singer / actress Nell Carter, actress Polly Holliday and film director John Badham; (for 1999) actress Tallulah Bankhead, actress / comedian / author Fannie Flagg and philanthropists and patrons of the arts Mr. and Mrs. Winton M. Blount.

Each year, a new group of inductees are honored at the annual gala, featuring a cast of dancers and singers from the roster of Theatre Tuscaloosa, accompanied by the Steve Sample Orchestra, with arrangements by Steve Sample, Sr. and Ray Reach.
