= Sylvia Kauders =

American actress

- Born: Sylvia Wolinsky; December 1, 1921; Philadelphia, Pennsylvania, U.S.
- Died: May 5, 2016 (aged 94); Philadelphia, Pennsylvania, U.S.
- Education: University of Pennsylvania
- Occupation: Actress
- Years active: 1980–2016
- Spouse: Randle Kauders (1946–1994; his death)

Sylvia Kauders (née Wolinsky; December 1, 1921 – May 5, 2016) was an American actress.

== Early life and education ==
Kauders was born Sylvia Wolinsky on December 1, 1921, in Philadelphia to Russian immigrants, Morris and Sadie (née Pincus) Wolinsky, and grew up in Upper Darby Township, Pennsylvania. When her father died while she was only ten, Kauders' mother ran a grocery store to support the family. Kauders attended Upper Darby High School and in 1942 graduated from the University of Pennsylvania, where she majored in English and social studies. She also took classes at Temple University to meet teaching requirements.

== Career ==
When Kauders's college education did not lead to a job, she learned shorthand and typing and in the mid-1940s began working as a secretary for the Jewish Community Relations Council and went on to become assistant to the group's public relations director.

In 1950 she took a temporary position in Philadelphia's information office, and that led to a career that spanned decades as she progressed from information officer to special events coordinator to director. During that time she worked with five current and former presidents of the United States. Her work included promoting the city on the television program Under Billy Penn's Hat.

Kauders worked in a variety of roles before committing in her 60s to a career in acting. Following college graduation she worked in radio and television, producing and moderating a television program called Under Billy Penn's Hat. She later became Philadelphia's special events director and worked with five different mayors, organizing events and hosting celebrities and dignitaries.

Kauders was the first woman president of the Philadelphia Public Relations Association in 1972–73 and became a member of its Hall of Fame in 1976.

In 1977, aged 55, she decided to seriously pursue an acting career and establish herself in New York City.

Her Broadway debut took place in 1982 in Harvey Fierstein's Torch Song Trilogy as Mrs. Beckoff, the role originated by Estelle Getty. With her role in Jewish Repertory Theater's production of Crossing Delancey, she became known as an "entirely lovable Bubbie ... a peppery lady whose charm is a mask for a determination to carry out her schemes", according to New York Times theater critic, Richard F. Shepard.

Her film credits include roles in American Splendor; Analyze That (2002); Predator 2 (1990), City Hall (1996). Woody Allen tapped her for two of his films, Crimes and Misdemeanors (1989) and Manhattan Murder Mystery (1993). Also in 1993, she appeared in My Life (as Diane Keaton's character's aunt). Her last films were Inside Llewyn Davis (2013) and Love the Coopers (2015).

Kauders appeared in such television shows as The Equalizer (1985), Law & Order: Special Victims Unit, and the HBO series The Sopranos during the final season, as a foul-mouthed old neighborhood lady, who seeks Tony's help with "fixing the neighborhood."

== Personal life and death ==
Her husband, Randy Kauders, died in the 1990s after they had been together for four decades. She died on May 5, 2016, in Hahnemann University Hospital in Philadelphia, aged 94.

== Filmography ==
=== Film ===
- Witness (1985) – Tourist Lady
- Armed and Dangerous (1986) – Older Woman at Party
- Sticky Fingers (1988) – Francis
- Misplaced (1989) – Teacher
- Crimes and Misdemeanors (1989) – Seder Guest
- Predator 2 (1990) – Ruth
- Age Isn't Everything (1991) – Old Woman
- This Is My Life (1992) – Evelyn
- Manhattan Murder Mystery (1993) – Neighbor
- My Life (1993) – Aunt Tekla
- City Hall (1996) – Gussie
- XXL (1997) – Secrétaire
- Meschugge (aka The Giraffe) (1998) – Sarah Singer
- Judy Berlin (1999) – Woman on Bench
- Love the Hard Way (2001) – Mrs. Rosenberg
- Mr. Deeds (2002) – Sue, the Bench Woman
- Analyze That (2002) – Aunt Esther
- American Splendor (2003) – Old Jewish Lady
- Imaginary Heroes (2004) – Hattie
- Building Girl (2005) – Mrs. Rochen
- The Last New Yorker (2007) – Miriam Weiss
- The Wrestler (2008) – Hudson Acres Lady at Deli Counter
- The Answer Man (2009) – Old Woman
- Today's Special (2009) – Restaurant Patron
- According to Greta (2009) – Mrs. Wocheski
- Man on a Ledge (2012) – Angry Traffic Woman
- The Big Wedding (2013) – Elderly Wife
- Peeples (2013) – Mrs. Davis
- Inside Llewyn Davis (2013) – Ginny
- The Mother (2015, Short) – Grandma
- Love the Coopers (2015) – Sara (final film role)

=== Television ===
Sylvia Kauders television credits
Year	Title	Role	Notes	Ref.
1985	The Equalizer	Old Lady	Episode: "Bump and Run"	
1990	Mr. Belvedere	Margaret "Peggy" Belvedere	1 episode	
1996–1997	Spin City	Roberta	6 episodes	
1997	Law & Order	Elderly Woman	Episode: "Mad Dog"	
1999	The Sopranos	Old Woman	Episode: "Pax Soprana" S1.E6	
2000–2010	Law & Order: Special Victims Unit	Mare / Anna / Esther	3 episodes	
2006	The Sopranos	Mrs. Conte	2 episodes	
2004	Hack	Irene Tolfo	1 episode	
2007	Flight of the Conchords	Lady on Bus	1 episode	
2008	Lipstick Jungle	Tiny Old Lady	1 episode	
2009	Loving Leah	Widow Goldfarb	TV movie	
2010	30 Rock	Old Woman	1 episode	
2010	Louie	Woman	1 episode	
2013	Blue Bloods	Mrs. Caruso	1 episode	
2014	Orange Is the New Black	Old Lady	1 episode	
