= Mel Shapiro =

American theatre director (1935–2024)

Melvin Irwin Shapiro (December 16, 1935 – December 23, 2024) was an American theatre director, writer and academic.

== Life and career ==
Shapiro was born in Brooklyn, New York City, in 1935. Trained at Carnegie-Mellon University, Shapiro began his professional directing career at the Pittsburgh Playhouse and then as resident director at Arena Stage in Washington, D.C. He was co-producing director at the Guthrie Theater in Minneapolis, Minnesota, and worked as guest director at the Hartford Stage company in Hartford, Connecticut, the Center Theatre Group in Los Angeles, California (where he directed the American premiere of Dario Fo's Accidental Death of an Anarchist), the National Playwright's Conference of the Eugene O'Neill Theater Center and the Stratford Shakespeare Festival in Canada.

Shapiro's off-Broadway productions include the original staging of John Guare's The House of Blue Leaves, which won the New York Drama Critics' Circle Award for Best American Play in 1971, and Rachel Owen's The Karl Marx Play for the American Place Theatre. London productions include the musicals Two Gentlemen of Verona and Kings and Clowns.

For Broadway, Shapiro co-wrote the book (with Guare) and directed the 1971 musical adaptation of Two Gentlemen of Verona and directed the 1978 revival of Stop the World – I Want to Get Off with Sammy Davis Jr. as well as Guare's 1979 play Bosoms and Neglect. He staged works at Lincoln Center in New York City, including Václav Havel's The Increased Difficulty of Concentration, which won an Obie Award for Best Foreign Play and Shakespeare's Richard III. His relationship with Joseph Papp spanned six years at the New York Shakespeare Festival. Among his productions there are Guare's Rich and Famous, Marco Polo Sings a Solo, and John Ford Noonan's Older People.

Shapiro was one of the founding members of New York University's Tisch School of the Arts and served as the head of the Carnegie Mellon School of Drama. He was the head of graduate acting for the Theatre Department at the University of California, Los Angeles. He taught and directed at the Queensland University of Technology's Theatre School in Brisbane, Australia, and the National Institute of Dramatic Art in Sydney, Australia, in fall 2011.

He served on the boards of the Pittsburgh Public Theater, the Society of Stage Directors and Choreographers, and the Fund for New American Plays at the Kennedy Center and the Theatre of Latin America.

Shapiro was the writer of The Director's Companion and An Actor Performs.

Shapiro died on December 23, 2024, at his home in Los Angeles, California from lung cancer at the age of 89.

== Directing credits ==
- Among the actors worked with are: Milton Berle, Sammy Davis, Jr., Raul Julia, Madeline Kahn, Christopher Walken, Stockard Channing, Jeff Goldblum, Linda Lavin, Joel Grey, Len Cariou, George Hearn, Billie Porter, Blair Underwood, James Woods, Patricia Routledge, Charles Ludlam, Allison Janney, Cloris Leachman, Anne Meara, Jerry Stiller and Rob Marshall
- Among other writers worked with: Isaac Bashevis Singer, Enemies, a Love Story; Dario Fo, Accidental Death of an Anarchist; Derek Walcott, The Charlatan

== Awards and nominations ==
- 1972 Tony Award for Best Book of a Musical (Two Gentlemen, winner)
- 1972 Tony Award for Best Musical, (Two Gentlemen, winner)
- 1972 Tony Award for Best Direction of a Musical (Two Gentlemen, nominee)
- 1972 Obie Award for Directing, (Two Gentlemen, winner)
- 1972 Drama Desk Award for Outstanding Book of a Musical (Two Gentlemen, winner)
- 1972 Drama Desk Award for Outstanding Director of a Play (Older People, winner)
- 1972 Drama Desk Award for Outstanding Director of a Musical (Two Gentlemen, winner)
- 1994 Drama-logue award, playwriting, The Price of Admission
- 1999 Drama-logue award, direction, The Misanthrope
- 1998 Joseph Kesselring award, playwriting, The Lay of the Land

== Books ==
- An Actor Performs, 2017
- A Director's Companion, 2018
