= Osborn Elliott =

American magazine editor (1924–2008)

- Born: October 25, 1924; New York City, U.S.
- Died: September 28, 2008 (aged 83); New York City, U.S.
- Occupations: Editor, journalist
- Spouse(s): Deirdre Spencer (divorced) Inger Abrahamsen (m. 1973)

Osborn Elliott (October 25, 1924 – September 28, 2008) was the editor of Newsweek magazine for sixteen years between 1961 and 1976. Elliott is credited with transforming Newsweek from a staid publication into a modern rival of Time.

Newsweek's circulation doubled to three million issues during Elliott's tenure as editor, which narrowed the gap with Time.

== Biography ==
=== Early life ===
Osborn Elliott was born in New York City, the son of Audrey Osborn and John Elliott. His father worked as an investment counselor. His mother was a high-profile real estate agent in Manhattan, who had been actively involved with the American women's suffrage movement of the early 20th century.

Elliott attended St. Paul's School in Concord, New Hampshire. He attended and graduated from Harvard University on an accelerated two-year wartime program. He served in the United States Navy for two years after graduation as a naval officer.

=== Career ===
Elliott began his career in the news magazine publishing industry by joining The Journal of Commerce and then Time.

He was first hired by Newsweek in 1955 as a senior editor of business news. He was promoted to managing editor of Newsweek in 1959.

Elliott was further elevated to editor of Newsweek in 1961 when the Washington Post Company acquired the magazine. He became editor in chief of Newsweek in 1969. He took on the additional roles of president, chief executive and chairman within the following three years.

New York City Mayor Abraham Beame offered Elliott a position with the New York City government in 1976 as the newly created deputy mayor of economic development. Elliott left Newsweek to take the deputy mayor position for an annual salary of $1 per year. Elliott's role in New York government was to reverse the loss of jobs which was taking place at the time in New York City. He served as deputy mayor for the remaining 15 months of the Beame administration.

Elliott was named dean of the Columbia University Graduate School of Journalism in January 1978. He stepped down from that position in 1986, but remained at the school as a journalism professor. The Asia Society, which is headquartered in New York City, has since named an annual journalism prize, the Osborn Elliott Prize for Excellence in Asian Journalism, in his honor. In 1975, Elliott founded Citizens Committee for New York City along with Senator Jacob Javits. His 1980 autobiography was titled "The World of Oz."

=== Personal life ===
With his first wife, Deirdre Spencer, Elliott had three children: Diana Elliott Lidofsky, Cynthia Elliott (Rice), and Dorinda Elliott (Ignatius). They divorced in 1972. He married his second wife, Inger McCabe Elliott, in 1973 and became a stepfather to her three children, Alec McCabe, Marit McCabe (Dubois), and Kari McCabe (McBride).

=== Death ===
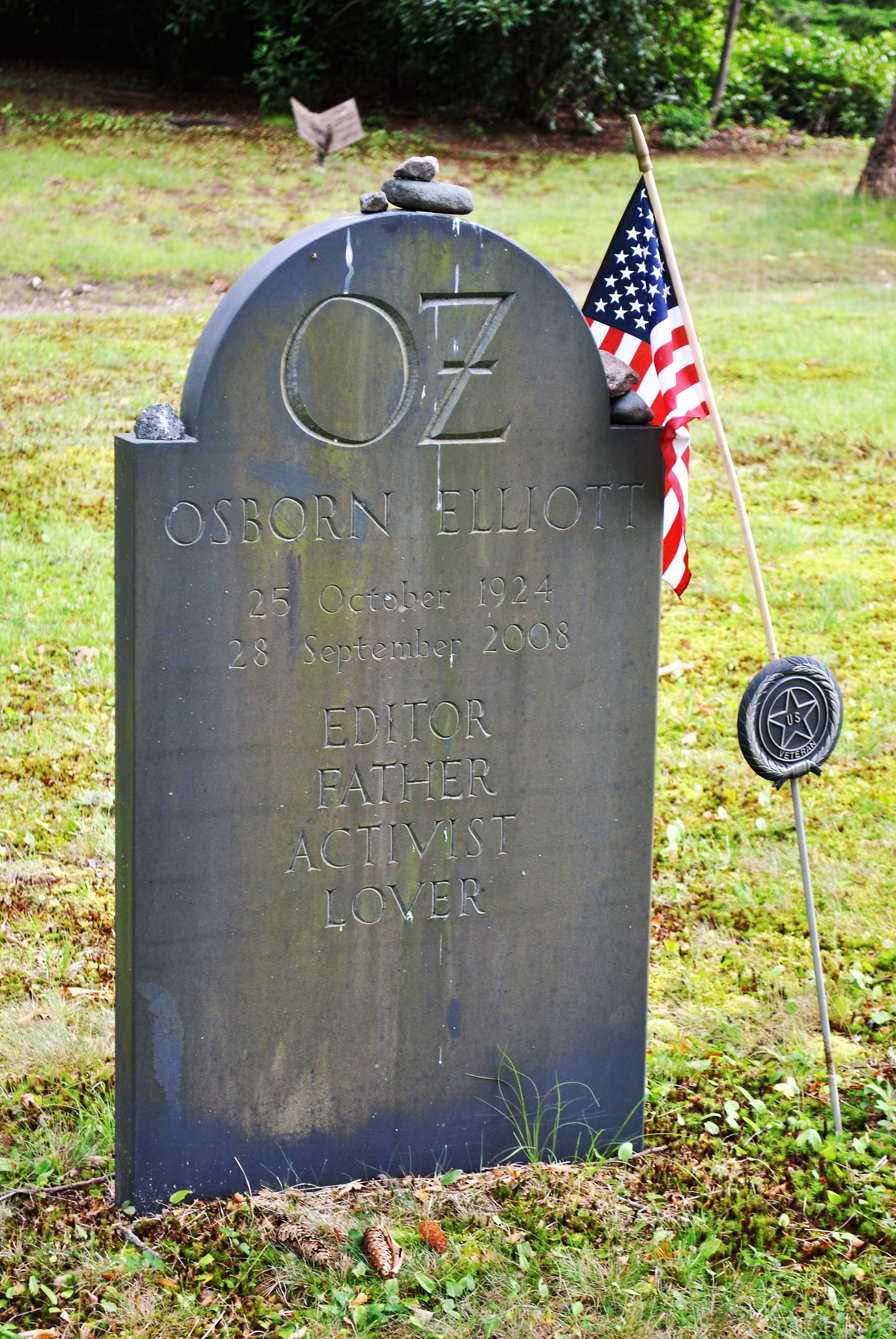
Evergreen Cemetery, Osborn Elliott

Osborn Elliott died in New York City on September 28, 2008. He was 83 years old. Elliott was survived by three daughters and stepchildren. The editor of Newsweek, Jon Meacham, called Elliott, "Wise and witty, Oz Elliott is the architect of the modern Newsweek." The Asia Society released a statement which called Elliott "one of the earliest practitioners of 'civic journalism' -- the deliberate focusing of the journalistic enterprise on urgent issues of public policy."

=== Cultural references ===
Elliott's victimization at the hands of the con artist David Hampton provided some of the basis for John Guare's drama Six Degrees of Separation.

== Works ==
- — (15 May 1980). The World of Oz: An Inside Report on Big-Time Journalism by the Former Editor of Newsweek (First ed.). Viking Adult. ISBN 978-0670787708. LCCN 79020649. OCLC 5353172. OL 4416673M – via Internet Archive.
