= The Last New Yorker =

- Directed by: Harvey Wang
- Written by: Adam Forgash
- Produced by: Adam Forgash; Danny Vinik
- Starring: Dominic Chianese; Dick Latessa
- Cinematography: Derek McKane
- Edited by: Jeff Flohr
- Music by: Dario Eskenazi
- Production company: Brink Films
- Release date: November 2007 (Big Apple Film Festival)
- Running time: 90 minutes
- Country: United States
- Language: English

The Last New Yorker is a 2007 American drama film directed by Harvey Wang and starring Dominic Chianese and Dick Latessa.

== Cast ==
- Dominic Chianese as Lenny Sugarman
- Dick Latessa as Ruben
- Kathleen Chalfant as Mimi
- Josh Hamilton as Zach
- Joe Grifasi as Jerry
- Ben Hammer as Moses Weiss
- Sylvia Kauders as Miriam Weiss
- Gerry Vichi as Lou Fishman

== Reception ==
The film has a 40% rating on Rotten Tomatoes. Christian Blauvelt of Slant Magazine awarded the film one and a half stars out of four.
