= John Wulp =

American scenic designer, director, and artist

- Born: May 31, 1928; New Rochelle, New York, U.S.
- Died: November 27, 2018 (aged 90); Rockport, Maine, U.S.
- Known for: Scenic Design, Producer, Director
- Notable work: Dracula; The Crucifer of Blood; Passione; Bosoms and Neglect; Gorey Stories
- Awards: Tony Award for Best Revival; Drama Desk Award for Outstanding Set Design; OBIE Award; Outer Circle Critics Award; Los Angeles Drama Critics Circle Award

John Wulp (May 31, 1928 – November 27, 2018) was an American scenic designer, producer, director, and artist.

== Theatrical career ==
Wulp's first play, The Saintliness of Margery Kempe, won a Rockefeller Grant and was produced at the Poets' Theatre in Cambridge, Massachusetts on February 19, 1957. Wulp also won an Obie Award for his direction of the 1961 stage play Red Eye of Love by playwright Arnold Weinstein. A musical adaptation of the play, with lyrics and libretto by Wulp and Weinstein, and music by Sam Davis, first premiered on Wulp's hometown island of North Haven, Maine before opening at the O'Neill Center in 2007. On September 4, 2014 Red Eye of Love the Musical opened Off-Broadway at the Amas Musical Theater in New York City.

Wulp won a Tony Award for Best Revival for his production of Dracula in 1978, which starred Frank Langella, with set designs by Edward Gorey, and opened at the Martin Beck Theatre on October 20, 1977. He received a Tony Award nomination and also won the Drama Desk Award for Outstanding Set Design for the 1979 production of The Crucifer of Blood. Wulp later went on to win an Outer Circle Critics Award and a Los Angeles Drama Critics Circle Award when the play was performed at the Royal Haymarket Theatre in London and at the Ahmanson Theatre in Los Angeles. His other Broadway credits include Passione, Bosoms and Neglect, and Gorey Stories.

== Personal life ==
Born and raised in New Rochelle, New York, Wulp studied scenic design at the Yale School of Drama. In the 1970s, he ran the Nantucket Stage Company on Nantucket.

In 1992, Wulp left New York and moved to the island of Vinalhaven, Maine. While there he taught at a community school on the adjacent island of North Haven; for which he later became a theater director. In 1999 he created the musical Islands with singer-songwriter Cidny Bullens. It later went on to play at the New Victory Theater in New York City in 2001.

Wulp retired from teaching in 2005. He died at the age of 90 in Rockport, Maine.

== Broadway / Off-Broadway Productions ==
- Red Eye of Love (1961) - The Living Theatre (director)
- Dracula (1977) - Martin Beck Theatre (producer)
- The Crucifer of Blood (1978) - Helen Hayes Theatre (producer/scenic design)
- Gorey Stories (1978) - Booth Theatre (producer)
- Bosoms and Neglect (1979) - Longacre Theatre (producer/scenic design)
- Passione (1980) - Morosco Theatre (producer)
- Red Eye of Love (Musical) (2014) - Amas Musical Theatre (producer / lyricist)
