= Adele Chatfield-Taylor =

American arts administrator

- Born: June 29, 1945 (age 81); Virginia, U.S.
- Occupation: Administrator
- Spouse: John Guare

Adele Chatfield-Taylor (born January 29, 1945) is an American arts administrator. She served as president and CEO of the American Academy in Rome from 1988 to 2013.

== Education, career, and honors ==
Virginia-born and bred Chatfield-Taylor received a B.A. from Manhattanville College in 1966 and an M.S. from the Graduate School of Architecture, Planning, and Historic Preservation at Columbia University in 1974. From 1973 to 1980, she was on the staff of the New York City Landmarks Preservation Commission.

She was a Loeb Fellow at the Harvard Graduate School of Design in 1978-1979 and executive director of the New York Landmarks Preservation Foundation from 1980 to 1984. From 1984 to 1988, she was director of the Design Arts Program for the National Endowment for the Arts, where she helped establish the Mayors' Institute on City Design in 1986.

She was a Rome Prize Fellow at the American Academy in Rome in 1983–1984, conducting a comparative analysis of American and Italian preservation practices. Appointed president of the American Academy in 1988, Chatfield-Taylor oversaw the rehabilitation of its historic buildings and grounds and led a highly successful fundraising campaign to secure the institution's solvency.

She was a Fellow of the New York Institute for the Humanities from 1983 to 1990 and a member of the U.S. Commission of Fine Arts from 1990 to 1994, and was elected a Fellow of the American Academy of Arts and Sciences in 1996.

In 2002, Chatfield-Taylor was awarded the Order of Merit of the Italian Republic. In 2010, she was awarded the Vincent Scully Prize from the National Building Museum.

In 2018, the Saint Nicholas Society awarded her the Medal of Merit recognizing her outstanding ability and service to the City of New York.

== Personal ==
Adele Chatfield-Taylor is married to the playwright John Guare.
