= Two Gentlemen of Verona (musical) =

1971 rock musical

- Original Cast Recording
- Music: Galt MacDermot
- Lyrics: John Guare
- Book: John Guare; Mel Shapiro
- Basis: William Shakespeare's The Two Gentlemen of Verona
- Productions: 1971 Broadway; 1973 West End; 2005 Shakespeare in the Park; 2011 St. Louis
- Awards: Tony Award for Best Musical; Tony Award for Best Book of a Musical; Drama Desk Outstanding Book; Drama Desk Outstanding Music; Drama Desk Outstanding Lyrics

Two Gentlemen of Verona is a rock musical, with a book by John Guare and Mel Shapiro, lyrics by Guare and music by Galt MacDermot, based on the Shakespeare comedy of the same name.

The original Broadway production, in 1971, won the Tony Awards for Best Musical and Best Book of a Musical. A London production followed in 1973. The Public Theater revived the piece in 2005.

== Synopsis ==
Proteus and Valentine, lifelong friends, each leave their rural hometown of Verona to experience life in the city of Milan. Valentine strikes out on his own, arriving first; he falls in love with Sylvia, and makes plans to win her hand. However, her father, the Duke of Milan, has betrothed her to the wealthy but undesirable Thurio. Antonio, a Veronese nobleman, then decides to send his son Proteus to the Duke's court in Milan, to experience a more well-rounded life. After his arrival in Milan, Proteus also sets his sights on Sylvia, disregarding his loyalty to both Valentine and Julia (his sweetheart back home). Valentine admits his own plans to elope with Sylvia. Proteus tells the Duke of their plans, gaining favor for himself - and causing Valentine's banishment from the court. Meanwhile, in Verona, Julia asks her maid Lucetta for help in deciding upon which of the two she should fall in love with. Julia disguises herself as a page named Sebastian so she can travel to Milan - accompanied by Lucetta, in the male guise of Caesario - to be reunited with Proteus. After arriving at court, she witnesses Proteus and Thurio wooing Sylvia.

While traveling to Mantua, the exiled Valentine is kidnapped by outlaws, who have been banished also. They demand that Valentine become their king, but if he refuses, they intend to kill him; Valentine accepts. In Milan, Julia (disguised as Sebastian) delivers to Sylvia the ring Proteus gave her, on his behalf (not realizing the page was actually his Veronese girlfriend). Sylvia enlists her friend Sir Eglamour to help her escape her betrothal to Thurio, and to find Valentine instead. However, while traveling through the forest, they are overtaken by a band of outlaws. Eglamour runs away, leaving Sylvia to fend for herself.

By then, the Duke, Proteus, and Thurio, along with the disguised Julia, organize a search party for Sylvia. Proteus wrests Sylvia away from the outlaws. Proteus demands that Sylvia give him some sign of her favor for freeing her, but she refuses. He tries to rape her, but the hidden Valentine emerges and stops him. Proteus apologizes, and Valentine offers to give him Sylvia as a token of their friendship. "Sebastian" (Julia) faints, revealing her true identity. Proteus decides he really loves Julia more than Sylvia, taking her instead. The Duke realizes that Thurio is a thug, and recognizes Valentine is much nobler and should marry Sylvia. Valentine asks for clemency for the outlaws, and suggests that his marriage to Sylvia and Proteus' marriage to Julia should take place on the same day.

== Original cast and characters ==
Character	Off-Broadway (1971)	Broadway (1971)	West End (1973)	Off-Broadway (2005)	Off-Broadway (2024)
Silvia	Jonelle Allen	Jonelle Allen	B. J. Arnau	Renée Elise Goldsberry	Taylor Iman Jones
Proteus	Raul Julia	Raul Julia	Ray C. Davis	Oscar Isaac	Jin Ha
Julia	Carla Pinza	Diana Davila	Jean Gilbert	Rosario Dawson	Alisa Melendez
Valentine	Clifton Davis	Clifton Davis	Samuel E. Wright	Norm Lewis	Jordan Donica
Lucetta	Alix Elias	Alix Elias	Veronica Clifford	Megan Lawrence	Alysha Umphress
Launce	Jerry Stiller	John Bottoms	Benny Lee	David Costabile	Coby Getzug
Eglamour	Alvin Lum	Alvin Lum	Minoo Golvala	Paolo Montalban	Sam Simahk
Duke of Milan	Norman Matlock	Norman Matlock	Keefe West	Mel Johnson Jr.	Chuck Cooper
Antonio	Frederic Warriner	Frederic Warriner	Terence Conoley	Richard Ruiz	-
Speed	Jose Perez	Jose Perez	Michael Staniforth	John Cariani	John-Michael Lyles
Thurio	Frank O'Brien	Frank O'Brien	Derek Griffiths	Don Stephenson	Kelvin Moon Loh

== Songs ==
Act I

- Summer, Summer - Ensemble
- I Love My Father - Ensemble
- That's a Very Interesting Question - Proteus and Valentine
- I'd Like to Be a Rose - Proteus and Valentine
- Thou, Julia, Thou Hast Metamorphosed Me - Proteus
- Symphony - Proteus and Ensemble
- I Am Not Interested in Love - Julia
- Love, Is That You? - Vissi D'Amore
- Thou, Proteus, Thou Hast Metamorphosed Me - Julia
- What Does a Lover Pack? - Julia, Proteus and Ensemble
- Pearls - Launce
- I Love My Father (Reprise) - Proteus
- Two Gentlemen of Verona - Julia, Lucetta and Ensemble
- Follow the Rainbow - Valentine, Speed, Proteus, Launce, Julia and Lucetta
- Where's North? - Valentine, Speed, Duke of Milan, Silvia, Thurio and Ensemble
- Bring All the Boys Back Home - Duke of Milan, Thurio and Ensemble
- Love's Revenge - Valentine
- To Whom It May Concern Me - Silvia and Valentine
- Night Letter - Silvia and Valentine
- Love's Revenge - Valentine, Proteus, Speed and Launce
- Calla Lily Lady - Proteus

Act II

- Land of Betrayal - Lucetta
- Thurio's Samba - Thurio, Duke of Milan and Ensemble
- Hot Lover - Launce and Speed
- What a Nice Idea - Julia
- Who Is Sylvia? - Proteus, Tavern Host and Ensemble
- Love Me - Silvia and Ensemble
- Eglamour - Eglamour and Ensemble
- Kidnapped - Julia, Duke of Milan, Proteus, Thurio and Ensemble
- Mansion † - Valentine
- Eglamour (Reprise) - Silvia and Eglamour
- What's a Nice Girl Like Her - Proteus
- Dragon Fight - Dragon, Eglamour, Proteus and Valentine
- Don't Have the Baby - Julia, Lucetta, Speed and Launce
- Love, Is That You? (Reprise) - Thurio and Lucetta
- Milkmaid - Launce and Milkmaid
- I Love My Father (Reprise) - Full Company
- Love Has Driven Me Sane - Full Company

† This number was replaced in the original London production by the song "Howl", due to concerns that the lyric to "Mansion" was too New York-centric, with references to rent control, sublets, and other uniquely urban concerns. For 1971 Broadway audiences, which were more New Yorkers than tourists (the reverse of Broadway audiences today), these references would have been both commonly understood and very funny in this faux-Shakespearean context. Theaters producing the show now have a choice between using "Howl" or "Mansion."

== Productions and history ==
After tryouts at the Delacorte Theater in Central Park in the summer of 1971 and twenty previews, the Broadway production, directed by Mel Shapiro and choreographed by Jean Erdman replaced by Dennis Nahat for Broadway and London productions, opened on December 1, 1971 at the St. James Theatre, where it ran for 614 performances. La Lupe had been cast in the role of Julia but was replaced in previews. Jeff Goldblum and Stockard Channing both made their Broadway debuts in the ensemble, understudying the roles of Eglamour and Lucetta respectively; Channing went on to play Julia.

The musical won two Tony Awards including Best Musical over such shows as Grease and Follies.

The original Broadway cast album was released on ABC Records in the US at the time; through merger and acquisition over the years, the Universal Music Group now owns the rights. The master tapes were restored for digital release through the Decca Broadway label in 2002.

An Australian production was presented at Her Majesty's Theatre in Melbourne, opening on March 31, 1973. The production featured John Waters, Gilbert Price, Gail Boggs and Judd Jones.

A West End production was mounted at the Phoenix Theatre beginning on April 26, 1973 and ran for 237 performances. Mel Shapiro directed with Dennis Nahat staging and choreography.

The New Jersey Shakespeare Festival revived the piece in 1996, directed by Robert Duke and starring Philip Hernandez, Dana M. Reeve, and Keith Byron Kirk.

The musical was revived by the Public Theater in their Shakespeare in the Park series for a limited run, from August 28, 2005, to September 11, 2005, at the Delacorte Theater. Kathleen Marshall directed and choreographed.

A one-night concert version of the show was presented at Symphony Space by Red Bull Theatre and directed by Zi Alikhan. Jordan Donica starred as Valentine opposite Jin Ha as Proteus and Chuck Cooper as Duke of Milan.

== Critical reception ==
In his review for The New York Times, Clive Barnes wrote, "What I really love about Two Gentlemen is its simplicity. Beneath all the multicolored gimmicks and extravagances, there are real people living and loving, and this I find very moving."

Critic Ben Brantley, in The New York Times, compared the 2005 revival to a "festive production" to "a fruity sangría", praising the cast but concluding that the work has not held up well. He wrote that the play's "wayward" characters were "not without parallels among the lotus-eating youth of the post-Woodstock years – a comparison that Messrs. Shapiro, Guare and MacDermot made canny use of. They also scaled down Shakespeare's passages of poetic pain for an approach that emphasized an easygoing, multicultural exuberance over wistful poetry and nonsense over sensibility.... [But] MacDermot's songs... lack the variety of his score for Hair.... And the lyricism Mr. Guare is known for as a playwright is rarely in evidence in his clunky work here as a lyricist".

== Awards and nominations ==
=== Original Broadway production ===
Year	Award	Category	Nominee	Result
1972	Tony Award	Best Musical		Won
1972	Tony Award	Best Book of a Musical	John Guare and Mel Shapiro	Won
1972	Tony Award	Best Original Score	Galt MacDermot and John Guare	Nominated
1972	Tony Award	Best Performance by a Leading Actor in a Musical	Clifton Davis	Nominated
1972	Tony Award	Best Performance by a Leading Actor in a Musical	Raul Julia	Nominated
1972	Tony Award	Best Performance by a Leading Actress in a Musical	Jonelle Allen	Nominated
1972	Tony Award	Best Direction of a Musical	Mel Shapiro	Nominated
1972	Tony Award	Best Choreography	Jean Erdman	Nominated
1972	Tony Award	Best Costume Design	Theoni V. Aldredge	Nominated
1972	Drama Desk Award	Outstanding Book of a Musical	John Guare and Mel Shapiro	Won
1972	Drama Desk Award	Outstanding Performance	Raul Julia	Won
1972	Drama Desk Award	Outstanding Performance	Jonelle Allen	Won
1972	Drama Desk Award	Outstanding Director of a Musical	Mel Shapiro	Won
1972	Drama Desk Award	Outstanding Choreography	Jean Erdman	Won
1972	Drama Desk Award	Outstanding Lyrics	John Guare	Won
1972	Drama Desk Award	Outstanding Music	Galt MacDermot	Won
1972	Drama Desk Award	Outstanding Costume Design	Theoni V. Aldredge	Won
1972	Theatre World Award		Jonelle Allen	Won
1972	New York Drama Critics' Circle Award	Best Musical	Galt MacDermot and John Guare	Won
