= Jill Novick =

American actress

- Occupation: Actress
- Years active: 1989–2000

Jill Novick is a former American actress. She is best known for playing Tracy Gaylian, the girlfriend of Brandon in the 1996–1997 season of Beverly Hills, 90210. Novick also played the young Theodora "Teddy" Reed on the TV series Sisters.

== Early life ==
Novick is the daughter of Don and Lynn Novick. As a junior at Mamaroneck High School (MHS), she was one of 32 people chosen from more than 200 applicants to receive a scholarship to Skidmore College's Summer School of the Arts. She performed in plays at MHS, and in 1983 she signed a contract with the Ann Wright Agency in Manhattan. She graduated from MHS in 1984.

== Career ==
Novick played Tracy Gaylian, the girlfriend of Brandon in the 1996–1997 season of Beverly Hills, 90210. She also played the young Theodora "Teddy" Reed on the TV series Sisters.

Novick appeared on the TV show Falcone. After Falcone, she returned to school. She is now a theatre teacher at Cibola High School in New Mexico.
