= Chris Bruno =

American actor

Chris Bruno is an American film and television actor, director, and producer, as well as a former Pro-MMA fighter and a commercial helicopter pilot. He is best known for his role as Sheriff Walt Bannerman on the television series The Dead Zone.

== Early life ==
Bruno was born in New Haven, Connecticut, to actor Scott Bruno and the late Nancy M. Bruno. His younger brother, Dylan, is also an actor (best known for his role as Colby Granger in Numb3rs). The brothers grew up in Milford with their mother, Nancy, but spent a substantial amount of time with their father on Manhattan's Upper West Side. During college, Bruno was active in both theater and sports. After an injury sidelined his skiing career while attending college in Vermont, he auditioned for and was cast in the lead in The Mandrake.. Transferring to the State University of New York at Stony Brook as a theatre major, he became the starting pitcher for the school's baseball team.

== Career ==
Soon after graduating college, Bruno joined the cast of Another World as Dennis Carrington Wheeler and was nominated for a Soap Opera Award for Outstanding Newcomer. After Another World, he was cast as Michael Delaney on ABC's All My Children. Bruno spent some time as a stand up comedian in the years following his soap opera stints and landed several guest-starring spots on the sitcoms The Nanny, Jesse and Suddenly Susan.

In 2001, he was cast as Walt Bannerman in USA Network's sci-fi drama The Dead Zone, the premiere of which was the highest-rated cable television series premiere at that time. In the series' fifth season, Bruno's directorial debut was the episode "Independence Day", which was dedicated in memory of his mother, who died of cancer.

Bruno remained a star on the show for the first five seasons; his character was killed off during the sixth-season premiere. Bruno made three additional guest appearances for the remainder of the final season. He also starred opposite Anthony Hopkins in the 2005 Roger Donaldson film The World's Fastest Indian, which according to Bruno was "one of the most exciting jobs" he's ever done.

In 2009, he appeared in 2 episodes of Prison Break and then appeared in the television movie Prison Break: The Final Break. He voiced Jack Slate in the 2002 video game Dead to Rights. In 2014 Bruno started playing the recurring role of Adam Stevens on ABC Family's The Fosters. In 2014 he also did two episodes of MTV's Awkward playing the role of Danny, Matt's biological father. In 2020 Bruno was cast by Director Gavin O'Connor in "The Way Back" with Ben Affleck.

Bruno is a professional MMA Fighter and was the oldest person in history to make his professional debut at 51 years old. Bruno is also a commercial helicopter pilot.

== Selected filmography ==
Year	Title	Role	Notes
2020	The Way Back	Sal DeSanto	
2017	5-Headed Shark Attack	Red	TV movie
2009	Truth Never Lies	Fred	
2009	The Cell 2	Sheriff Harris	
2008	Dead and Gone	Constable	
2007	Grendel	Beowulf	
2005	The World's Fastest Indian	Bob Higby	
2002–2007	The Dead Zone	Sheriff Walt Bannerman	
2002	Dead to Rights	Jack Slate	
1998	My Girlfriend's Boyfriend	Cliff	
1995–1997	All My Children	Michael Delaney	
1991–1993	Another World	Dennis Carrington Wheeler	
