= Six Degrees of Separation (play) =

1990 play by John Guare

- Original poster by James McMullan
- Original language: English
- Written by: John Guare
- Genre: Drama
- Setting: New York City

Premiere
- Date: 1990
- Place: Mitzi E. Newhouse Theater; New York City

Six Degrees of Separation is a play written by American playwright John Guare that premiered in 1990. The play was nominated for the Pulitzer Prize for Drama and the Tony Award for Best Play. The play explores the existential premise that everyone in the world is connected to everyone else in the world by a chain of no more than six acquaintances, thus, "six degrees of separation". It was adapted into a film of the same name in 1993.

== Synopsis ==
A young black man named Paul shows up at the home of art dealer Flan Kittredge and his wife Louisa, known simply as "Ouisa", who live overlooking Central Park in New York City. Paul has a minor stab wound from an attempted mugging, and says he is a friend of their children at Harvard University. The Kittredges are trying to get the money to buy a painting by Paul Cézanne, and now have this wounded stranger in their home. Paul claims he is in New York to meet his father, Sidney Poitier, who is directing a film version of the Broadway musical Cats. Paul continues to charm them with his story, though in reality, it is all a lie: Paul is no Harvard student and obtained details on the Kittredges from a male student he had seduced. Eventually Paul uses their home for an encounter with a hustler, but is caught red-handed. The police are called, but Paul escapes.

Soon after, Paul starts up another con against a sensitive young man named Rick and his live-in girlfriend, Elizabeth. The naive young couple are new to the big city having just moved to New York from Utah and, based on Paul's con, invite him to live with them until he gets everything sorted out with his wealthy father—who Paul tells them is Flan Kittredge. The trio become good friends, with Paul spinning a tale of being estranged from his racist father, but still, the girlfriend tells Rick not to lend Paul any money. One night Paul takes Rick out on the town and seduces him in order to get the money. Later that night, Rick tells Elizabeth that Paul is gone, that he has all their money, and that he and Paul had sex. In a fit of fury, she cruelly suggests that Rick's father had always questioned his son's sexuality. Soon afterwards Rick commits suicide.

In desperation, Paul calls the Kittredges for assistance. Partly due to strained relations with her children, Ouisa finds herself feeling emotionally attached to Paul, hoping to be able to help him in some way despite the fact that he has victimized them. Over a protracted and laborious phone call, he agrees to give himself up to the police; however, during the arrest, he and the couple are separated. Despite their efforts—Ouisa's more than Flan's—his fate is unresolved, except for a possibly tragic end. Towards the end of the play, in a climactic moment of reflection, she delivers the play's most famous monologue:

I read somewhere that everybody on this planet is separated by only six other people. Six degrees of separation. Between us and everybody else on this planet. The president of the United States. A gondolier in Venice. Fill in the names. I find that A) tremendously comforting that we're so close and B) like Chinese water torture that we're so close. Because you have to find the right six people to make the connection. It's not just big names. It's anyone. A native in a rain forest. A Tierra del Fuegan. An Eskimo. I am bound to everyone on this planet by a trail of six people. It's a profound thought. How Paul found us. How to find the man whose son he pretends to be. Or perhaps is his son, although I doubt it. How every person is a new door, opening up into other worlds. Six degrees of separation between me and everyone else on this planet. But to find the right six people.

== Historical casting ==
| Character | 1990 Off-Broadway | 1990 Broadway | 1992 West End | 1993 Film cast | 1st National Tour | 2017 Broadway revival |
|---|---|---|---|---|---|---|
| Ouisa Kittredge | Stockard Channing | Stockard Channing | Stockard Channing | Stockard Channing | Marlo Thomas | Allison Janney |
| Flan Kittredge | John Cunningham | John Cunningham | Paul Shelley | Donald Sutherland | John Cunningham | John Benjamin Hickey |
| Paul | James McDaniel | Courtney B. Vance | Adrian Lester | Will Smith | Ntare Mwine | Corey Hawkins |

Kristin Griffith and Swoosie Kurtz read the role of Ouisa Kittredge in workshops in 1989 before Stockard Channing was cast. Channing was originally unavailable and was committed to coming to Broadway in another play, Neil Simon's Jake's Women. The play's Broadway run was canceled. Channing had starred previously in John Guare's The House of Blue Leaves, and he offered her the role for the official Off-Broadway run. Kurtz later replaced Channing during the Broadway run.

== Production history ==
The play premiered Off-Broadway at the Mitzi E. Newhouse Theater, Lincoln Center, on May 16, 1990. Stockard Channing won an Obie Award for Best Actress for her performance. Guare won an Obie Award for his script. The production was transferred to the Vivian Beaumont Theater for its Broadway debut on November 8, 1990. The production closed on January 5, 1992, after 485 performances, directed by Jerry Zaks. John Cameron Mitchell originated the role of Trent, which was his non-replacement debut on Broadway. Kelly Bishop played the role of Ouisa as a replacement on Broadway, and Laura Linney made her Broadway debut as a replacement for the role of Tess. The original Broadway production was nominated for four Tony Awards, winning for Best Direction for Zaks. A US. National tour was launched in 1992. Veronica Hamel also played Ouisa in the first production in Chicago.

The play made its UK debut in 1992 at the Royal Court Theatre and then transferred to the West End's Comedy Theatre. In 2010, the play was revived at the Old Vic theatre in London starring Lesley Manville as Ouisa. A 1995 production at Canadian Stage in Toronto, Ontario starred Fiona Reid as Ouisa, Jim Mezon as Flan and Nigel Shawn Williams as Paul. Both Williams and Reid won Dora Mavor Moore Awards for their performances, Williams as Outstanding Performance by a Male in a Principal Role – Play and Reid as Outstanding Performance by a Female in a Principal Role – Play. In May 2004 Michael Buffong directed a production at the Royal Exchange, Manchester with Lisa Eichhorn as Ouissa Kittredge, Phillip Bretherton as Flanders Kittredge and O-T Fagbenle as Paul. O-T Fabenle won a MEN Award for his performance. The play was revived on Broadway at the Ethel Barrymore Theatre in a limited engagement opening on April 5, 2017, starring Allison Janney, John Benjamin Hickey and Corey Hawkins, with direction by Trip Cullman.

== Background ==
The play was inspired by the real-life story of David Hampton, a con man and robber who managed to convince a number of people in the 1980s that he was the son of actor Sidney Poitier. The writer John Guare was a friend of Inger McCabe Elliott and her husband Osborn Elliott. In October 1983 Hampton came to the Elliotts' New York apartment and they allowed him to spend the night. The next morning Inger Elliott found Hampton in bed with another man and later called the police. The Elliotts told Guare about the story and it inspired him to write the play years later.

Hampton was tried and acquitted for harassment of Guare after the play became a critical and financial success; he felt that, as the real life protagonist of the story, he was due a share of the profits that he ultimately never received. A strong influence on the play is the novel The Catcher in the Rye by J. D. Salinger. There are some very overt references to it, as when the protagonist explains the thesis paper he has just written on The Catcher in The Rye to the family who takes him in for the night. There are also more subtle allusions made both in the script and in the cinematography of the film version, such as when various characters begin to take on Holden Caulfield-esque characteristics and attitudes.

== Film adaptation ==
Guare adapted the play for a film released in 1993 directed by Fred Schepisi. Channing was nominated for the Academy Award for Best Actress for her performance in the film.

== Awards and nominations ==
=== Original Broadway production ===
| Year | Award ceremony | Category | Nominee | Result |
|---|---|---|---|---|
| 1991 | Tony Award | Best Play | | Nominated |
| 1991 | Tony Award | Best Actor in a Play | Courtney B. Vance | Nominated |
| 1991 | Tony Award | Best Actress in a Play | Stockard Channing | Nominated |
| 1991 | Tony Award | Best Direction of a Play | Jerry Zaks | Won |
| 1991 | Drama Desk Award | Outstanding New Play | | Nominated |
| 1991 | Drama Desk Award | Outstanding Actress in a Play | Stockard Channing | Nominated |
| 1991 | Drama Desk Award | Outstanding Director of a Play | Jerry Zaks | Won |
| 1991 | Outer Critics Circle Award | Outstanding New Broadway Play | | Nominated |
| 1991 | Outer Critics Circle Award | Outstanding Actress in a Play | Stockard Channing | Nominated |
| 1991 | Outer Critics Circle Award | Outstanding Director | Jerry Zaks | Nominated |
| 1991 | New York Drama Critics' Circle Award | Best Play | John Guare | Won |
| 1991 | Clarence Derwent Awards | Most Promising Male Performer | James McDaniel | Won |

=== Original London production ===
| Year | Award ceremony | Category | Nominee | Result |
|---|---|---|---|---|
| 1993 | Laurence Olivier Award | Best New Play | | Won |
| 1993 | Laurence Olivier Award | Best Actress in a Play | Stockard Channing | Nominated |

=== 2017 Broadway revival ===
| Year | Award ceremony | Category | Nominee | Result |
|---|---|---|---|---|
| 2017 | Tony Award | Best Revival of a Play | | Nominated |
| 2017 | Tony Award | Best Actor in a Play | Corey Hawkins | Nominated |
| 2017 | Outer Critics Circle Award | Outstanding Actress in a Play | Allison Janney | Nominated |
| 2017 | Drama League Award | Outstanding Revival of a Play | | Nominated |
| 2017 | Drama League Award | Distinguished Performance | Corey Hawkins | Nominated |
| 2017 | Drama League Award | Distinguished Performance | Allison Janney | Nominated |

== See also ==
- Small world phenomenon
- Six Degrees of Kevin Bacon (game)
- Erdős number
