= Chaucer in Rome =

Play written by John Guare

Chaucer in Rome is a play written by John Guare. In part, it is a sequel to House of Blue Leaves, with one character from that play, Ron Shaughnessy, appearing in Chaucer in Rome.

== Synopsis ==
The play is set in Rome during the 2000 Holy Year of Jubilee, which is crowded with pilgrims seeking confession and absolution. Matt, a celebrated landscape painter, lives at the American Academy in Rome with his lover, Sarah, and his best friend, Pete. Sarah and Pete are both art historians; Pete is studying artistic depictions of Christ's fingernails.

Matt is recovering from squamous cell carcinoma, and Pete and Sarah are horrified to discover that Matt's cancer was caused by his deliberate use of carcinogenic chemicals in his paintings as a political statement against environmental pollution. Meanwhile, Pete's life is complicated by the arrival of his parents, Ron and Dolo. Pete suggests that Matt work in a different medium and eventually convinces him to try filmmaking. But when Matt decides that his newest project will be to impersonate a priest and secretly videotape the confessions of pilgrims, the results threaten to drive Pete's already unstable parents over the edge.

== Production ==
Chaucer in Rome premiered at the Williamstown Theatre Festival, running in July and August 1999. Directed by Nicholas Martin, the cast featured Polly Holliday, Bruce Norris, Lee Wilkof and B.D. Wong. The play was produced Off-Broadway at the Lincoln Center Theater Newhouse Theater from May 10, 2001 to July 29, 2001. Directed by Nicholas Martin, the cast featured Jon Tenney (Matt), Polly Holliday (Dolo), Bruce Norris (Pete), Lee Wilkof (Il Dottore, Father Shapiro), Dick Latessa (Ron), and Carrie Preston (Sarah).
