= Polly Holliday =

American actress (1937–2025)

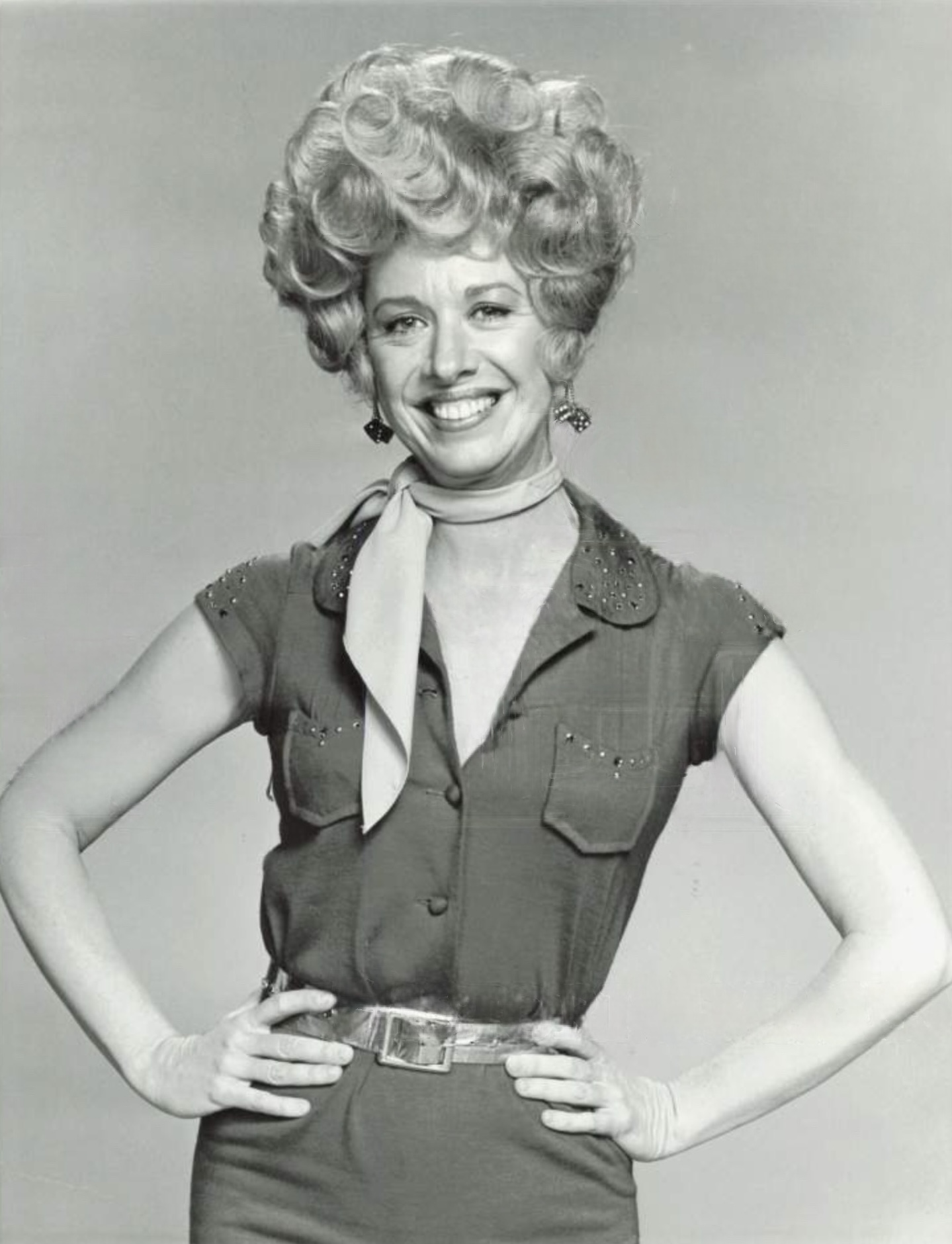
- Holliday in Flo (1980)
- Born: Polly Dean Holliday; July 2, 1937; Jasper, Alabama, U.S.
- Died: September 9, 2025 (aged 88); New York City, U.S.
- Education: Alabama College, State College for Women; Florida State University
- Occupation: Actress
- Years active: 1963–2010
- Awards: Alabama Stage and Screen Hall of Fame

Polly Dean Holliday (July 2, 1937 – September 9, 2025) was an American actress of stage and screen. Holliday was best known for her portrayal of sassy waitress Florence Jean "Flo" Castleberry on the 1970s sitcom Alice, winning two Golden Globe Awards for Best Supporting Actress on the series. Her character's catchphrase "Kiss my grits!" enjoyed widespread popularity, and she reprised the role on Flo, a short-lived spin-off. Holliday won the 1984 Saturn Award for Best Supporting Actress portraying Ruby Deagle in Gremlins.

== Early life ==
Polly Dean Holliday was born in Jasper, Alabama, on July 2, 1937, the daughter of Ernest Sullivan Holliday, a truck driver, and Velma Mabell Holliday (née Cain). She grew up in Childersburg; her brother Doyle was a boyhood friend of Jim Nabors, who lived in nearby Sylacauga.

Holliday attended the Alabama College for Women at Montevallo (now known as the University of Montevallo) in the late 1950s where she excelled in the theater department, playing the lead roles in The Lady's Not for Burning and Medea. She graduated in 1959 with a degree in piano. She went on to Florida State University, and spent the first phase of her career earning respect on the classical stage.

Holliday worked as a piano teacher in her native Alabama, and then in Florida. She began her professional acting career as a member of the Asolo Theatre Company in Sarasota, Florida, where she stayed for 10 years.

== Career ==
In 1972, Holliday moved to New York City and appeared in Alice Childress' play Wedding Band at the Public Theater. More than a year later, she was cast in the Broadway hit All Over Town. While working on All Over Town, she befriended the play's director, Dustin Hoffman, with whom she later appeared in the 1976 movie All the President's Men.

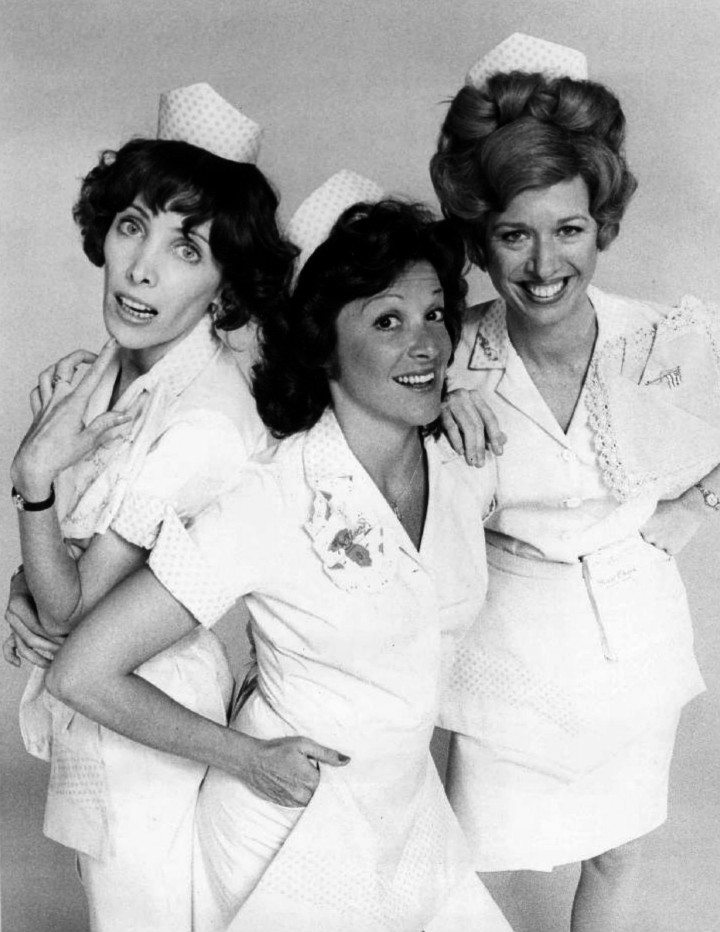
(L–R): Beth Howland as Vera, Linda Lavin as Alice, and Polly Holliday as Flo on Alice (1976)

In 1976, Holliday was cast—in what would be her major break—as sassy, man-hungry waitress Florence Jean "Flo" Castleberry on Alice, a sitcom airing on CBS. Her character coined the popular catchphrase "Kiss my grits!", which became part of American vernacular. Holliday starred in Alice from 1976 to 1980, and then moved to her own short-lived spin-off show Flo, in which Flo moved back home to Texas from Arizona. The show was successful during its abbreviated first season, but ratings declined during the following season due to a time change, and it was canceled in 1981.

In 1983, Holliday joined the cast of the CBS sitcom Private Benjamin as a temporary replacement for series regular Eileen Brennan, who was recovering from serious injuries after being struck by a car. She made appearances on television shows, including in The Golden Girls as Rose Nylund's blind sister Lily, in a recurring role as Jill Taylor's mother on Home Improvement, and as a regular character on The Client.

Holliday's film roles include appearances in All the President's Men (1976, as Martin Dardis' secretary), Moon over Parador (1988), Mrs. Doubtfire (1993), and The Parent Trap (1998). In the 1984 hit Gremlins she played ruthless miser Ruby Deagle, winning the Saturn Award for Best Supporting Actress. Her final credit was in the 2010 film Fair Game, in which she played Diane Plame, the mother of Valerie Plame.

On Broadway, she appeared in revivals of Arsenic and Old Lace (1986) as Martha Brewster, one of the dotty, homicidal, sweet old aunties; Cat on a Hot Tin Roof (1990), for which she was nominated for a Tony Award as Best Featured Actress in a Play for her portrayal of Big Mama; and Picnic (1994) as neighbor Flo Owens. In 2000, she appeared at Lincoln Center in a revival of Arthur Laurents's The Time of the Cuckoo.

In 2000, she was inducted into the Alabama Stage and Screen Hall of Fame.

== Personal life ==
Holliday was an Episcopalian who sang in the St. Andrews Episcopal Choir in Montevallo, Alabama. In January 2010, she appeared as herself in an official advertising campaign for the Episcopal Church. In New York City, she sang in the Episcopal Grace Church Choral Society in Greenwich Village and ran a chamber music series there.

== Death ==
After a decline in her health, Holliday died from an apparent bout of pneumonia at her home in Manhattan, New York City, on September 9, 2025, at the age of 88. She was the last surviving member of the original cast of Alice. She never married or had children. She is buried at Green Hill Memorial Gardens in Childersburg, Alabama, beside her mother.

== Filmography ==
=== Film ===
| Year | Title | Role | Notes |
|---|---|---|---|
| 1975 | W.W. and the Dixie Dancekings | Mrs. Cozzens | |
| 1975 | Pittsville - Ein Safe voll Blut | Miss Pearson | |
| 1975 | Distance | Mrs. Herman | |
| 1976 | All the President's Men | Dardis's Secretary | |
| 1978 | The One and Only | Mrs. Crawford | |
| 1984 | Gremlins | Mrs. Ruby Deagle | Saturn Award for Best Supporting Actress |
| 1988 | Moon Over Parador | Midge | |
| 1993 | Mrs. Doubtfire | Gloria Chaney | |
| 1996 | Mr. Wrong | Mrs. Alston | |
| 1998 | The Parent Trap | Marva Kulp Sr. | |
| 2006 | Stick It | Judge Westreich | |
| 2007 | The Heartbreak Kid | Beryl | |
| 2010 | Fair Game | Diane Plame | Final film role |

=== Television movies ===
| Year | Title | Role | Notes |
|---|---|---|---|
| 1974 | Wedding Band | Annabelle | |
| 1975 | The Silence | Mrs. Watson | |
| 1976 | Bernice Bobs Her Hair | Mrs. Harvey | |
| 1979 | You Can't Take It with You | Miriam Kirby | |
| 1981 | All the Way Home | Aunt Hannah | |
| 1982 | Missing Children: A Mother's Story | Mary Gertrude | |
| 1983 | The Gift of Love: A Christmas Story | Aunt Minerva | |
| 1985 | Lots of Luck | Lucille | |
| 1985 | Konrad | Berti Bartolotti | |
| 1991 | A Triumph of the Heart: The Ricky Bell Story | Ruth Weidner | |
| 1996 | A Loss of Innocence | Christina Eriksen | |
| 2004 | It Must Be Love | Mama Bell | aka Surviving Love |

=== Television series ===
| Year | Title | Role | Notes |
|---|---|---|---|
| 1974 | Search for Tomorrow | Prison Inmate Leader | 6 episodes |
| 1976–1980 | Alice | Florence Jean "Flo" Castleberry | Main role, 90 episodes Golden Globe Award for Best Supporting Actress - Series, Miniseries or Television Film (1979–1980); Nominated—Primetime Emmy Award for Outstanding Supporting Actress in a Comedy Series (1978–1980) |
| 1980–1981 | Flo | Florence Jean "Flo" Castleberry | Main role, 29 episodes Nominated—Golden Globe Award for Best Actress - Television Series Musical or Comedy; Nominated—Primetime Emmy Award for Outstanding Lead Actress in a Comedy Series |
| 1982 | American Playhouse | Mrs. Wooster | Episode: "The Shady Hill Kidnapping" |
| 1982–1983 | Private Benjamin | Capt. Amanda Allen | 3 episodes |
| 1985 | Stir Crazy | Captain Betty | Episode: "Pilot" |
| 1986 | The Golden Girls | Lily Lindstrom | Episode: "Blind Ambitions" |
| 1986 | Amazing Stories | Elma Dinnock | Episode: "The Pumpkin Competition" |
| 1988 | The Equalizer | Sister Sara | Episode: "Regrets Only" |
| 1993–1999 | Home Improvement | Lillian Patterson | 5 episodes |
| 1995–1996 | The Client | Momma Love | Main role, 21 episodes |
| 1996 | Homicide: Life on the Street | Mrs. Rath | Episode: "The Heart of a Saturday Night" |

=== Stage ===
| Year | Title | Role | Notes |
|---|---|---|---|
| 1971 | Candida | Candida | Asolo Theatre Company |
| 1971 | The House of Blue Leaves | Bananas | Asolo Theatre Company |
| 1972 | Wedding Band | Annabelle | The Public Theater, Off-Broadway |
| 1974 | All Over Town | Philomena Hopkins | Booth Theatre, Broadway |
| 1985 | Black Coffee | Miss Caroline Amory | GeVa Theatre |
| 1986 | Arsenic and Old Lace | Martha Brewster | 46th Street Theatre, Broadway |
| 1988 | The Glass Menagerie | Amanda Wingfield | Guthrie Theatre |
| 1990 | Cat On A Hot Tin Roof | Big Mama | Eugene O'Neill Theatre, Broadway |
| 1993 | A Quarrel of Sparrows | Rosanna | Promenade Theater, Off-Broadway |
| 1994 | Picnic | Flo Owens | Criterion Center Stage Right, Broadway |
| 1998 | Marco Polo Sings a Solo | Mrs. McBride | Signature Theatre Company, Off-Broadway |
| 2000 | The Time of the Cuckoo | Mrs. Edith McIlhenny | Lincoln Center Theater, Off-Broadway |
| 2001 | Chaucer in Rome | Dolo | Lincoln Center Theater, Off-Broadway |
| 2002 | A Few Stout Individuals | Mrs. Grant | Signature Theatre Company, Off-Broadway |
| 2002 | Every Good Boy Deserves Favour | Teacher | Wilma Theater |
| 2004 | Free and Clear | Matron | Asolo Theatre Company |
