= Passione (play) =

1980 play by Albert Innaurato

Playbill cover from 1980 Broadway production

Passione is a comic play by American playwright Albert Innaurato that follows a day in the life of an Italian-American family in an apartment in South Philadelphia, Pennsylvania.

After a tryout beginning in May 1980 at Playwrights Horizons, it ran on Broadway at the Morosco Theatre from September 23 to October 5, 1980, directed by Frank Langella in his directorial debut. It starred Jerry Stiller and Angela Paton. Costume design was by William Ivey Long and lighting design was by Paul Gallo.

Time's critic said that "rollicking ethnic humor is couched in lacerating ethnic self-contempt" and predicted box-office success for the play, while Brendan Gill in The New Yorker observed that "The title of the play is an Italian noun meaning not only "passion" and "love" but "suffering," and, for all that the play is a comedy, suffering is the emotion that pervades it." John Simon in New York commented that "Taken as pure knockabout farce ... Passione gives modest but fairly consistent delight ... But when it goes serious, it has serious problems".
