= John Guare =

American playwright and screenwriter (born 1938)

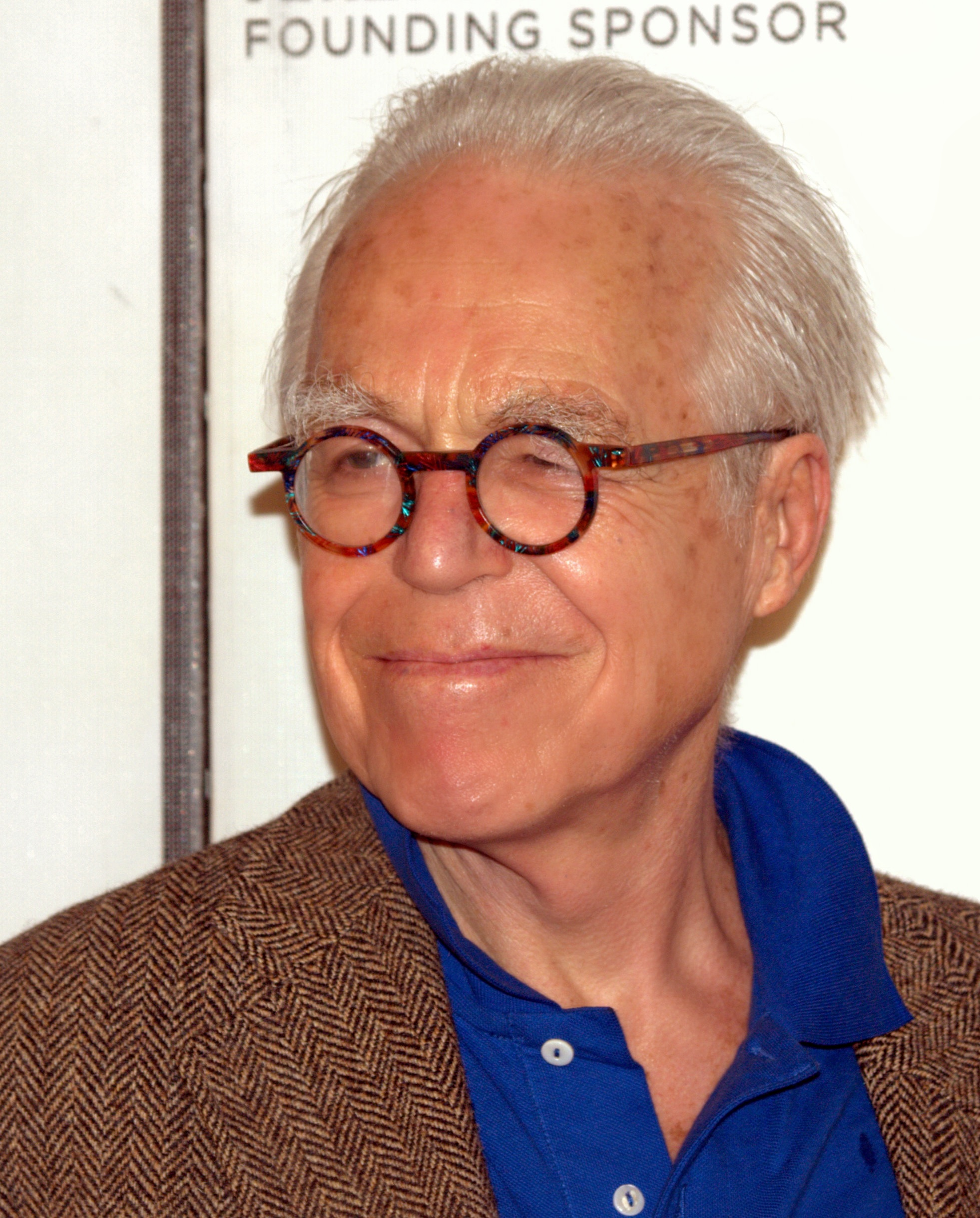
- Guare at the Tribeca Film Festival in 2009
- Born: February 5, 1938 (age 88); Jackson Heights, Queens, New York, U.S.
- Education: Georgetown University (BA); Yale University (MFA)
- Occupation: Playwright
- Spouse: Adele Chatfield-Taylor
- Writing career
- Period: 1964–present
- Notable works: The House of Blue Leaves; Six Degrees of Separation

John Guare (/ɡwɛr/ GWERR; born February 5, 1938) is an American playwright and screenwriter. He is best known as the author of The House of Blue Leaves and Six Degrees of Separation.

== Early life ==
John Guare was raised in Jackson Heights, Queens. In 1949, his father suffered a heart attack and subsequently moved the family to Ellenville, New York, while he recovered. His father's relatives lived there, making it an idyllic experience for him. Guare did not regularly attend school in Ellenville because the school's daily practices were not in keeping with the recommendations of the Catholic Church, causing his father to suspect the school had communist leanings. Instead of attending school, Guare was assigned home study and took exams intermittently, which allowed him time to go to the movies and see all the hits of the time. This had a lasting influence on Guare and his career.

He attended Georgetown University and the Yale School of Drama, graduating in 1962 with a M.F.A in Playwriting. Under the direction of Georgetown's Donn B. Murphy, his play The Toadstool Boy, about a country singer's quest for fame, won first place in the District of Columbia Recreation Department's One-Act-Play competition. In 1960, the Mask and Bauble presented The Thirties Girl, a musical for which Guare did the book, much of the music and the lyrics, again under Murphy's tutelage. Set in 1920s Hollywood, it deals with the dethronement of a reigning diva by a fresh-faced starlet.

== Career ==
Guare's early plays, mostly comic one-acts exhibiting a flair for the absurd, include To Wally Pantoni, We Leave a Credenza, produced at Caffe Cino in 1965 and Muzeeka (1968).

Cop-Out premiered on Broadway at the Cort Theatre on April 7, 1969, and closed on April 12, 1969, as part of two one-act plays, including Home Fires. Cop-Out starred Linda Lavin and Ron Leibman.

The House of Blue Leaves, a domestic black comedy, premiered Off-Broadway in 1971 at the Truck and Warehouse Theatre. It was revived off-Broadway at the Lincoln Center for the Performing Arts in 1986 before transferring to Broadway later in 1986. The play was revived on Broadway in 2011, starring Ben Stiller, whose mother, Anne Meara, had appeared in the 1971 production. According to Marilyn Stasio writing in Variety the play "sets the bar for smart comic lunacy."

Chaucer in Rome, "said to be a sequel of sorts to ... The House of Blue Leaves and includ[ing] the son of one of the earlier play's characters" received its world premiere at the Williamstown Theatre Festival in July 1999 and was produced Off-Broadway in 2001 at Lincoln Center Theater's Newhouse Theater.

Later plays include Marco Polo Sings a Solo, produced at the Joseph Papp Public Theater/New York Shakespeare Festival in January to March 1977, with a cast that featured Joel Grey, Anne Jackson, Madeline Kahn, and Sigourney Weaver. Bosoms and Neglect was produced on Broadway in 1979, and revived off-Broadway in 1998 by the Signature Theatre Company. Moon Over Miami was produced at the Williamstown Theatre Festival in 1987 and then at the Yale Repertory Theatre in New Haven, Connecticut in February 1989.

Guare's cycle of plays on nineteenth-century America are: Gardenia (1982) Lydie Breeze (1982) and Women and Water (1985). The so-called Lydie Breeze series, also called the "Nantucket" series, "follows a group of idealistic 19th century characters and their attempts to create a utopian society. "

Six Degrees of Separation was originally produced off-Broadway by Lincoln Center Theater at the Mitzi E. Newhouse Theater in June 1990. Six Degrees of Separation is an intricately plotted comedy of manners about an African-American confidence man who poses as the son of film star Sidney Poitier. It has been the most highly praised and widely produced of Guare's full-length plays. It was made into a film in 1993, starring Stockard Channing and Will Smith.

Four Baboons Adoring the Sun was presented on Broadway at the Vivian Beaumont Theater from February 22, 1992, to April 19, 1992, and was nominated for the 1992 Tony Award, Best Play.

Lake Hollywood (1999) and A Few Stout Individuals (2002) both received their world premieres at the Signature Theatre. A Few Stout Individuals is set in nineteenth century America, with a cast of characters that includes Ulysses S. Grant, Mark Twain, soprano Adelina Patti and the Emperor and Empress of Japan.

Guare has also been involved with musical theatre. His libretto with Mel Shapiro for the musical Two Gentlemen of Verona was a success when it premiered in 1971 and was revived in 2005 at the Public Theater's Shakespeare in the Park. It won the Drama Desk Award for Outstanding Book of a Musical as well as the Tony Award for Best Book of a Musical. He wrote the songs for Landscape of the Body. Guare wrote narration for Psyche, a tone poem by César Franck, which premiered at Avery Fisher Hall in October 1997, conducted by Kurt Masur with the New York Philharmonic.

Guare made uncredited revisions to the book for the 1999 Broadway revival of the Cole Porter musical comedy Kiss Me, Kate. He wrote the book for the musical Sweet Smell of Success, which premiered on Broadway in 2002, for which he received a 2002 Tony Award nomination, Book of a Musical.

His play A Free Man of Color was a finalist for the 2011 Pulitzer Prize for Drama. The Pulitzer citation called it "an audacious play spread across a large historical canvas, dealing with serious subjects while retaining a playful intellectual buoyancy."

Guare wrote the screenplay for Louis Malle's film Atlantic City (1980), for which he was nominated for an Oscar.

=== Other activities ===
Guare was an original member in 1965 of the Eugene O'Neill Theater Center in Waterford, Connecticut and Resident Playwright at the New York Shakespeare Festival, during which time he wrote Landscape of the Body, Rich and Famous, and Marco Polo Sings a Solo.

He is a council member of the Dramatists Guild.

He is Co-Executive Editor of the Lincoln Center Theater Review, which he founded in 1987. He co-produces the New Plays Reading Room Series at the Lincoln Center Library for the Performing Arts and teaches in the Playwriting department at the Yale School of Drama.

=== Critical acclaim ===
In his foreword to a collection of Guare's plays, Louis Malle wrote:

Guare practices a humor that is synonymous with lucidity, exploding genre and clichés, taking us to the core of human suffering: the awareness of corruption in our own bodies, death circling in. We try to fight it all by creating various mythologies, and it is Guare's peculiar aptitude for exposing these grandiose lies of ours that makes his work so magical.

Gregory Mosher, formerly the artistic director of Lincoln Center Theater, said that Guare, "along with David Mamet, Sam Shepard and a handful of other dramatists, reshaped the face of contemporary American theater over the past quarter century."

== Works ==
All plays for the stage unless otherwise noted.

- 1966: Cop-Out (one-act)
- 1967: Home Fires (curtain raised for Cop Out)
- 1971: The House of Blue Leaves
- 1971: Two Gentlemen of Verona
- 1971: Taking Off (screenplay)
- 1973: Marco Polo Sings a Solo – Off-Broadway revival 1977
- 1974: Rich and Famous
- 1977: Landscape of the Body
- 1979: Bosoms and Neglect
- 1980: Atlantic City (screenplay)
- 1981: In Fireworks Lie Secret Codes
- 1982: Lydie Breeze
- 1982: Gardenia
- 1985: Women and Water
- 1986: The Race to Urga
- 1987: Moon Under Miami (revived as Moon Over Miami in 1989 and as Moon Under Miami in 1995)
- 1990: Six Degrees of Separation
- 1992: Four Baboons Adoring the Sun – Broadway (Vivian Beaumont Theatre)
- 1999: Lake Hollywood – Off-Broadway
- 2001: Chaucer in Rome
- 2002: A Few Stout Individuals
- 2010: A Free Man of Color – Broadway (Vivian Beaumont Theater)
- 2011: Erased/Elżbieta
- 2012: Are You There, McPhee? – McCarter Theatre
- 2013: 3 Kinds of Exile – Off-Broadway
- 2014: Between (short play)
- 2019: Nantucket Sleigh Ride - Off-Broadway (Lincoln Center Newhouse) (revised version of Are You There, McPhee?)

== Awards and honors ==
- Muzeeka won an Obie for Distinguished Play in 1968.
- The House of Blue Leaves won the New York Drama Critics' Circle Award for Best American Play in 1971 and the 1971 Obie Award, Best American Play; it won four Tony Awards for its 1986 revival at Lincoln Center Theater.
- Two Gentlemen of Verona won both the Tony Award and the New York Drama Critics Circle Award for Best Musical in 1972. Guare also received the Drama Desk Award for Outstanding Lyrics and Book.
- Six Degrees of Separation won an Obie Award, the New York Drama Critics Circle Award, and London's Olivier Award for Best Play; it was a finalist for the 1991 Pulitzer Prize for Drama.
- Guare received the Award of Merit in 1981 from the American Academy of Arts and Letters for his plays The House of Blue Leaves, Rich and Famous, Marco Polo Sings a Solo, Landscape of the Body and Bosoms and Neglect. He received the Gold Medal in 2004.
- In 1989, the American Academy and Institute of Arts and Letters elected him a member.
- In 1993, he was elected to the American Theater Hall of Fame.
- In 1996, he received the Golden Plate Award of the American Academy of Achievement.
- The Signature Theatre honored him with a season 1998 – 1999.
- In 2003, he received the PEN/Laura Pels International Foundation for Theater Award for a Master American Dramatist.
- In 2005, Guare was awarded the Obie Award for Sustained Achievement
- Guare received an honorary Master of Fine Arts degree from A.C.T. Conservatory, San Francisco, in May 2009.
- Guare received the Dramatists Guild Lifetime Achievement Award from the Dramatists Guild of America, in 2014.

== Personal life ==
Guare is married to Adele Chatfield-Taylor, a historic preservationist; she was President and CEO of the American Academy in Rome. They split their time between New York City, Long Island and the historic village of Waterford, Virginia, where his wife grew up.
