= The True History of the Elephant Man =

1980 biography of Joseph Merrick

- Author: Michael Howell; Peter Ford
- Publisher: Allison & Busby
- Publication date: 1980
- Publication place: United Kingdom
- Pages: 194 (1st edition)
- ISBN: 0-85031-353-8
- OCLC: 7280384

The True History of the Elephant Man is a biography of Joseph Merrick written by Michael Howell and Peter Ford. It was published in 1980 in London, by Allison & Busby. It was distributed in the United States by Schocken Books. A second edition was published in 1983. Following Michael Howell's death in 1986, Peter Ford published a third edition of the book in 1992.

== Background ==
Joseph Carey Merrick was born in 1862 in Leicester. Within the first few years of his life it became apparent that he suffered from deformities on his face and body. These deformities grew to be significantly noticeable, and tumours on his mouth affected his speech. After leaving home, Merrick was unable to make a living and at 17 he entered Leicester Union workhouse. After four years in the workhouse, Merrick contacted a showman who agreed to exhibit him as the "Elephant Man". While on display in a penny gaff shop in London, Merrick met a surgeon named Frederick Treves who invited Merrick to the London hospital to be examined. Soon after, Merrick's exhibition was shut down by the police and Merrick travelled to Belgium under a new manager. After being robbed and abandoned, he found his way back to London and into the care of Treves. Merrick was allowed to live in rooms at the London Hospital where he became a celebrity in London's high society. He stayed there until his death in 1890.

Frederick Treves wrote about Merrick's case in his memoirs of 1923. The first major work about Merrick's life was The Elephant Man: A Study in Human Dignity by anthropologist Ashley Montagu, published in 1971. Montagu drew heavily on Treves' memoirs, and the "autobiographical" pamphlet that had been written to sell to visitors to Merrick's exhibitions. Montagu's book inspired numerous dramatic works about Merrick, notably a 1977 play by Bernard Pomerance and a 1980 film by David Lynch. Between these two works, Michael Howell and Peter Ford published their True History.

== Reception ==
In a book review for Medical History, medical historian Roy Porter called the book "well-researched and level-headed — easily the best offering in this year of the elephant man", and noted the new material on the topic introduced by the authors. Reviewing for Postgraduate Medical Journal, M. J. Arnold praised the book, calling it "a comprehensive account ... of the complex interrelationships between Joseph and Treves, beautifully written..." Arnold went on to say that "[t]his is surely the last word and the true version" of Merrick's story.

Writing for The New York Times, Anatole Broyard called the book "absorbing and well-balanced" and noted that it "corrects earlier versions of Merrick's life".

== Editions ==
- Howell, Michael; Ford, Peter (1980), The True History of the Elephant Man (1st ed.), London: Allison & Busby, ISBN 0-85031-353-8
- Howell, Michael; Ford, Peter (1983), The True History of the Elephant Man (2nd ed.), London: Allison & Busby, ISBN 0-85031-513-1
- Howell, Michael; Ford, Peter (1992), The True History of the Elephant Man (3rd ed.), London: Penguin Books, ISBN 0-14-016515-0
