= List of accolades received by The Elephant Man =

The Elephant Man
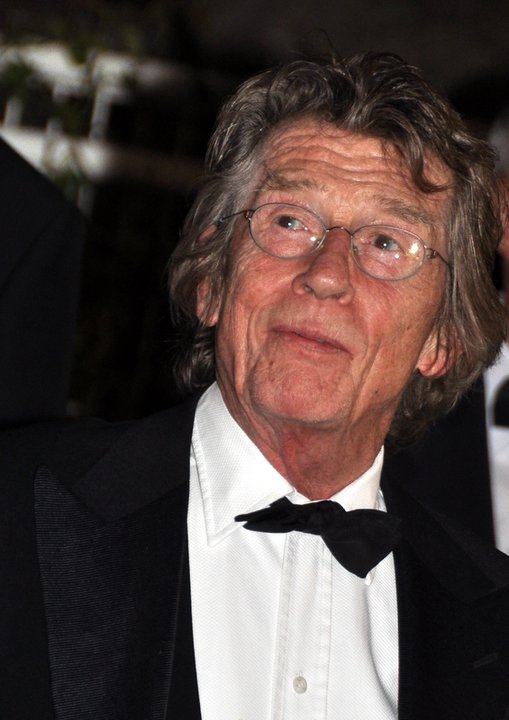
- John Hurt at the 2011 Cannes Film Festival
Awards and nominations
| Award | Wins | Nominations |
| Academy Award | 0 | 8 |
| Belgian Film Critics Association | 1 | 1 |
| British Academy Film Awards | 3 | 7 |
| British Society of Cinematographers Awards | 1 | 1 |
| César Awards | 1 | 1 |
| Directors Guild of America Award | 0 | 1 |
| Golden Globe Awards | 0 | 4 |
| Grammy Awards | 0 | 1 |

Totals (Note: Certain award groups do not simply award one winner. They acknowledge several different recipients, have runners-up, and have third place. Since this is a specific recognition and is different from losing an award, runner-up mentions are considered wins in this award tally. For simplification and to avoid errors, each award in this list has been presumed to have had a prior nomination.)
- Wins: 6
- Nominations: 24

The Elephant Man is a 1980 American drama film based on the true story of Joseph Merrick (called John Merrick in the film), a severely deformed man in 19th century London. The film was directed by David Lynch and stars John Hurt, Anthony Hopkins, Anne Bancroft, John Gielgud, Wendy Hiller, Michael Elphick, Hannah Gordon, and Freddie Jones. Lynch adapted the screenplay draft by Christopher De Vore and Eric Bergren. Although Mel Brooks agreed to produce the film through his production company Brooksfilms, it was turned down by a number of studios before it was finally greenlit by Paramount Pictures.

Seen perhaps as the most conventional of Lynch's otherwise surrealist films, The Elephant Man was a commercial success, grossing over $26 million in the United States alone. The film was also a critical success, garnering universal acclaim and receiving multiple award nominations. Both Lynch and Hurt received nominations at the Academy Awards and British Academy Film Awards. The film went on to win the Best Film award at the latter, as well as Best Foreign Film at the César Awards.

The film's technical production was similarly lauded. John Morris' score was also nominated for several awards, including receiving a nod at the 24th Grammy Awards, but failed to win each time. The film's cinematography, by English cinematographer Freddie Francis, was likewise nominated for several awards, receiving one from the British Society of Cinematographers. In addition, the film's editing, costume design, art direction and screenplay received nominations at the Academy Award and BAFTA ceremonies.

== Awards and nominations ==
| Award | Year | Category | Recipient | Result | Ref(s) |
|---|---|---|---|---|---|
| Academy Awards | 1981 | Best Picture | Jonathan Sanger | Nominated | |
| Academy Awards | 1981 | Best Director | David Lynch | Nominated | |
| Academy Awards | 1981 | Best Actor | John Hurt | Nominated | |
| Academy Awards | 1981 | Best Adapted Screenplay | David Lynch, Christopher De Vore and Eric Bergren | Nominated | |
| Academy Awards | 1981 | Best Art Direction | Stuart Craig, Robert Cartwright & Hugh Scaife | Nominated | |
| Academy Awards | 1981 | Best Costume Design | Patricia Norris | Nominated | |
| Academy Awards | 1981 | Best Film Editing | Anne V. Coates | Nominated | |
| Academy Awards | 1981 | Best Original Score | John Morris | Nominated | |
| Belgian Film Critics Association | 1982 | Grand Prix | David Lynch | Won | |
| British Academy Film Awards | 1981 | Best Film | Jonathon Sanger | Won | |
| British Academy Film Awards | 1981 | Best Actor | John Hurt | Won | |
| British Academy Film Awards | 1981 | Best Production Design | Stuart Craig | Won | |
| British Academy Film Awards | 1981 | Best Direction | David Lynch | Nominated | |
| British Academy Film Awards | 1981 | Best Screenplay | David Lynch, Christopher De Vore and Eric Bergren | Nominated | |
| British Academy Film Awards | 1981 | Best Cinematography | Freddie Francis | Nominated | |
| British Academy Film Awards | 1981 | Best Editing | Anne V. Coates | Nominated | |
| British Society of Cinematographers Awards | 1980 | Best Cinematography | Freddie Francis | Won | |
| César Awards | 1982 | Best Foreign Film | David Lynch | Won | |
| Directors Guild of America Awards | 1981 | Outstanding Directing | David Lynch | Nominated | |
| Golden Globe Awards | 1981 | Best Director | David Lynch | Nominated | |
| Golden Globe Awards | 1981 | Best Motion Picture – Drama | Jonathon Sanger | Nominated | |
| Golden Globe Awards | 1981 | Best Actor – Drama | John Hurt | Nominated | |
| Golden Globe Awards | 1981 | Best Screenplay | Eric Bergren | Nominated | |
| Grammy Awards | 1982 | Best Soundtrack Album | John Morris | Nominated | |

== See also ==
- List of accolades received by David Lynch

== Footnotes ==
=== References ===
- Le Blanc, Michelle; Odell, Colin (2000). David Lynch. Pocket Essentials. ISBN 1-903047-06-4.
- Rodley, Chris; Lynch, David (2005). Lynch on Lynch (2nd ed.). Macmillan. ISBN 0-571-22018-5.
