= Sam Torr =

English music hall comedian

- The Same Old Game, sheet music cover by J.B. Geoghegan (1878)
- Born: Samuel Joseph Torr; 1849; Nottingham, England
- Died: 1923 (aged 73–74); Nottingham, England
- Occupation: music hall entertainer

Samuel Joseph Torr (1849–1923) was an English music hall comedian who performed in a style known as lion comique.

He performed his best-known song, "On the Back of Daddy-O", dressed in a life-size dummy with a wicker work frame to create the illusion that he was riding piggyback on the dummy. A popular entertainer, Torr appeared at all the major music hall venues around Britain including Wilton's Music Hall in London.

== Early life ==
Torr was born in Albion Street, Nottingham, in 1849. He started singing in public early in life under the management of Dick Middleton, of the Atheneum, Nottingham. He was then taken in hand by John Wood, a noted singer and proprietor of the Golden Ball in Coalpit Lane, who ran a 'free-and-easy' attached to his house. At 17, he performed his first engagement away from Nottingham in Leith outside Edinburgh.

== Family life ==
Torr married John Wood's daughter, Elizabeth, with whom he had four children: Annie, Clara, Emma and Sam. Clara Torr (1868 - 1934) would follow in her father's footsteps as a music hall performer as well as being an accomplished pianist in her own right. After Elizabeth died, Torr married for a second time and had a further four children.

== Sam Torr and Joseph Merrick - "The Elephant Man" ==
After a successful career in the music halls, Torr retired to Leicester, becoming landlord of the Green Man pub in 1882. A year later, he took on the Gladstone Vaults in Wharf Street, converting it into a music hall - the Gaiety Palace of Varieties. Aimed at an upmarket clientele, it opened on 30 April 1883, but after running into financial difficulties, closed three years later. It was during this period as a music hall promoter that Joseph Merrick wrote to Torr asking for employment as an exhibited freak, so he could escape the grinding poverty of life in the workhouse. Torr visited Merrick and agreed to his request, persuading three other managers (Mr J Ellis, George Hitchcock and 'Professor' Sam Roper) to come in with him to form a syndicate and exhibit Merrick initially around the Nottingham and Leicester area. It was Torr and Ellis who suggested that Merrick should present himself as 'the Elephant Man - Half a Man and Half an Elephant'. Torr quickly realized Merrick would need to work with a London-based manager if Merrick was to fully capitalize on his appearance. Torr made contact with Tom Norman, a showman who specialized in showcasing 'human oddities'. Norman took on Merrick, exhibiting him in London at 123 Whitechapel Road.

== Later life ==
After the failure of 'the Gaiety', Torr returned to the music hall, successfully reviving his career with new comic songs as well as old favorites. By 1899, his performances were increasingly out of fashion with London audiences and Torr retired for a second time. Returning to Leicester, in 1904, he injured himself after falling off the stage while intoxicated during a performance of 'On the Back of Daddy-O'. In 1909, Torr became the manager of the Malt Cross in Nottingham. Opened in 1877, the Malt Cross was a well established music hall venue. By the time Torr arrived, the Malt Cross was in decline. Torr took it over, running it with the help of his second family and occasionally performing on the small stage himself. The Malt Cross finally closed for good in 1911 and Torr then moved his family to a house in Shakespeare Street, Nottingham where he lived until his death in 1923.
