= Tom Norman =

19th and 20th-century English businessman and showman (1860 – 1930)

Tom Norman, born Thomas Noakes (7 May 1860 – 24 August 1930), was an English businessman, a showman, and the last exhibitor of Joseph Merrick, who was known as the "Elephant Man". Among Norman's later exhibits were a troupe of little people, a "Man in a Trance", "John Chambers, the armless Carpenter", and the "World's Ugliest Woman".

Norman started his working life as a butcher in Sussex before moving to London at the age of 14, where he sought a career on the music hall stage. There, he became interested in freak shows which he attended in his spare time. After viewing an exhibition called "Electric Lady" next door to his place of work, he went into business with the exhibition's manager and began his career as a showman of human oddities. He quickly became successful, for his patter as much as his exhibits, and was called the 'Silver King' by the American showman P. T. Barnum.

In 1884, Norman took over the management of Joseph Merrick, otherwise known as the "Elephant Man", and exhibited him for a few weeks until police closed down the show. Merrick later went to live at the London Hospital under the care of Sir Frederick Treves. In his 1923 memoirs, Treves portrayed Norman as a cruel drunk who ruthlessly exploited his acts. Norman contested this characterisation and said that he had provided Merrick (and his other "freaks") with a means of making money independently. Norman continued a successful career as a showman and later became an auctioneer of novelty shows and circuses.

== Biography ==
=== Early life ===
Norman was born Thomas Noakes on 7 May 1860 in Dallington, Sussex. He was the eldest of 17 children to Thomas Noakes, a butcher and a farmer, and his wife Eliza (née Haiselden).

Norman was introduced to his father's trade at an early age and left school to work with him when he was 12. He decided to go travelling two years later to seek a career as a performer. He was unsuccessful and after a short while, he moved to London where he worked as a butcher's assistant. A keen gambler, Norman moved to Berkshire where he took up professional gambling at Ascot Racecourse. He wound up penniless and resumed his butchery trade in London where he gained a new interest in freak show entertainment.

=== Novelties ===
But you could indeed exhibit anything in those days. Yes, anything from a needle to an anchor, a flea to an elephant, a bloater, you could exhibit as a whale. It was not the show, it was the tale that you told.

— Tom Norman

After his unsuccessful venture in Berkshire, Norman returned to being a butcher, and, one day, viewed the "novelties" at a penny gaff next to his place of employment in Islington. There, Mlle Electra, "The Only Electric Lady – A Lady Born Full of Electricity" gave audience members an electrical shock via her handshake. Norman was impressed with the exhibition, realised its lucrative potential, and left his job to enter into business with Mlle Electra's manager. He quickly discovered Electra was a fake connected to a supply of electricity.

When Mlle Electra was exhibited at Kingston Fair, Norman realised he would be better off working alone, and successfully staged his own "Electric Lady" in Hammersmith. He learned that his skills as an entertainer were as important to his success as the novelties he exhibited. At some point, he changed his birth name to Tom Norman, and renounced his inheritance. According to Joseph Merrick's biographers Michael Howell and Peter Ford, Norman may have changed his name to avoid shaming his family by his "distasteful" connections to circuses and fairgrounds.

Over the next few years, Norman's travelling exhibitions featured Eliza Jenkins, the "Skeleton Woman", a "Balloon-Headed Baby" and a woman who bit off the heads of live rats—the "most gruesome" act Norman claimed to have seen. Other acts included fleas, obese ladies, giants, dwarves and retired white seamen, painted black and speaking in an invented language, billed "savage Zulus". He displayed a "family of midgets" which in reality was composed of two men and a borrowed baby. He operated a number of shops in London and Nottingham, and exhibited travelling shows throughout the country. In 1882, Norman gave a show at Islington's Royal Agricultural Hall. Unknown to Norman, the show was attended by American showman P. T. Barnum. Norman falsely claimed to his audience, as he had often done in the past, that his show had been booked to appear at Barnum's 'Greatest Show on Earth'. Barnum was much amused and afterwards, seeing Norman's silver necklace and noting his gift for oratory, dubbed him the 'Silver King'. With 13 shops in London alone, Norman ran into a shortage of curiosities and travelled the country looking for new acts. He enticed human novelties into his employ with promises of generous salaries.

=== Elephant Man ===
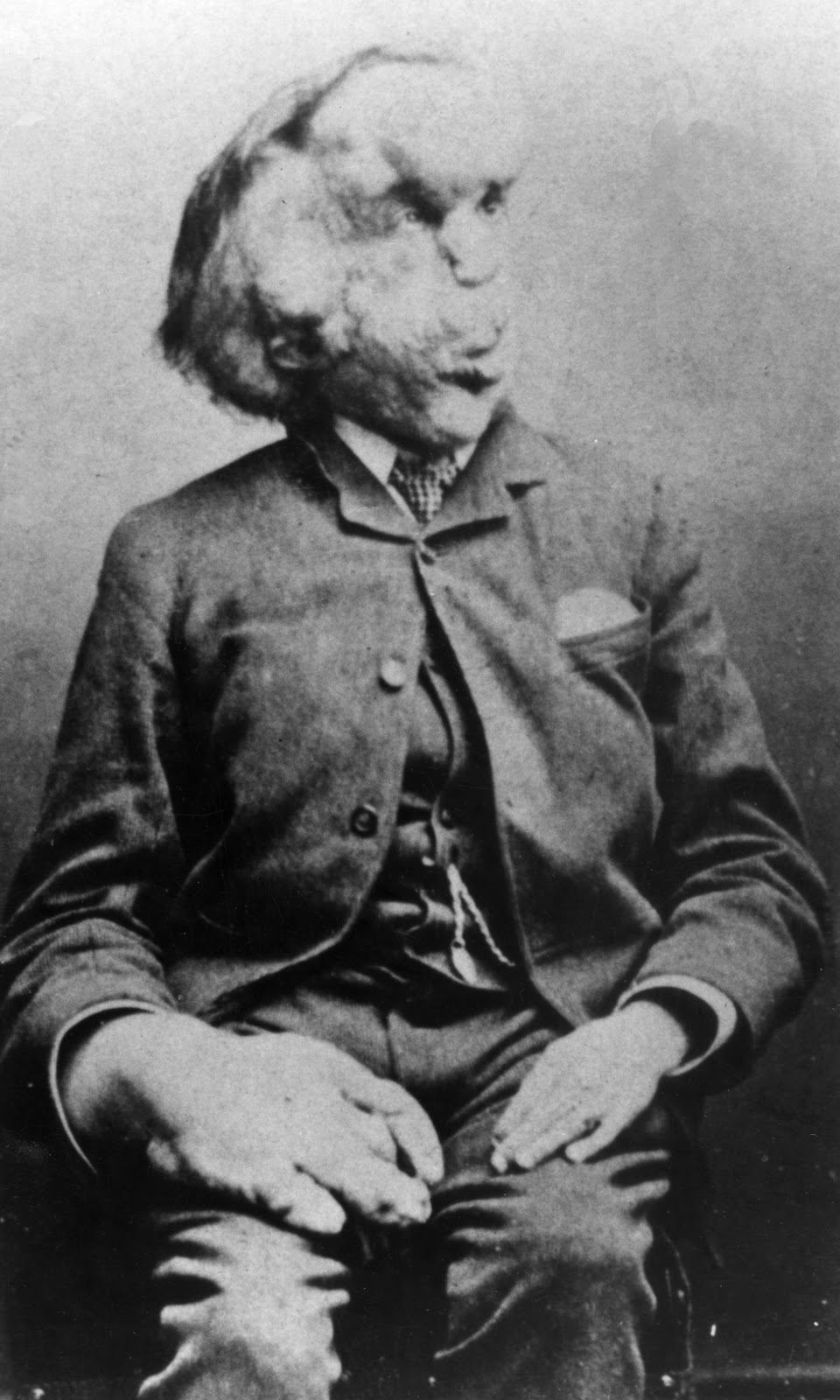
Joseph Merrick whom Norman managed as a curiosity

In 1884, Norman came into contact with Joseph Merrick, a young man from Leicester who had extreme deformities. Unable to find work due to his physical appearance, Merrick ended up in the Leicester workhouse for four years. He then put himself in the charge of the music hall proprietors Sam Torr and J. Ellis, and the travelling showman 'Little George' Hitchcock. Collectively, they presented Merrick as "The Elephant Man, Half-a-Man and Half-an-Elephant". They quickly realised that they would not be able to show Merrick for too long in one place, for fear of the novelty wearing off, and towards the end of 1884, Hitchcock contacted Norman, an acquaintance of his, and transferred management of the Elephant Man to him.

Merrick arrived in London and into Norman's care. Norman, initially shocked by Merrick's appearance and reluctant to display him, nonetheless exhibited him at his penny gaff shop at 123 Whitechapel Road, directly across the road from the London Hospital. Because of its proximity to the hospital, the shop received medical students and doctors as visitors. One of these was the surgeon Frederick Treves who arranged to have Merrick brought into the hospital to be examined. According to Norman's autobiography, Merrick went to the hospital "two or three" times, but then refused to go any more, as the examinations made him feel "like an animal in a cattle market".

The exhibition of the Elephant Man was reasonably successful, particularly with the added income from a printed pamphlet about Merrick's life and condition. At this time, however, public opinion about freak shows was starting to change and the display of human novelties was beginning to be viewed as distasteful. After only a few weeks with Norman, the Elephant Man exhibition was shut down by the police, and Norman and Merrick parted ways. Treves later arranged for Merrick to live at the London Hospital until Merrick's death in 1890. In Treves's 1923 memoir, The Elephant Man and Other Reminiscences Norman was portrayed as a drunk who cruelly exploited Merrick. Norman counteracted these claims in a letter in the World's Fair newspaper that year, as well as his own autobiography. Norman's opinion was that he provided Merrick (and his other exhibits) a way of making a living and remaining independent, but that on entering the London Hospital, Merrick remained a freak on display, only with no control over how or when he was viewed. The character Bytes, portrayed by Freddie Jones in the 1980 film The Elephant Man, is based on Norman.

=== Later life ===
Norman remained a travelling showman for another 10 years following his encounter with Joseph Merrick, and exhibited, among others, a troupe of midgets, a 'Man in a Trance', John Chambers the armless Carpenter and the 'World's Ugliest Woman'. In 1893, he announced that he was leaving for Chicago and advertised his goods for sale, but in the end, he never went. He became involved with the temperance movement and was the vice-president of the Van Dwellers Protection Association (which later became the Showmen's Guild of Great Britain). He became a showman's auctioneer, auctioning novelty shows and circuses and according to the World's Fair, presided over more such sales than any other auctioneer in the country at that time. Norman married the theatre performer Amy Rayner in 1896, and they had six sons and four daughters. The family moved to Croydon, and Norman went into semi-retirement, selling off some of his shops. In 1905 he sold showman "Lord" George Sanger's zoo, and then all of Sanger's circus effects, an achievement Norman called "the crowning point in my life as regards the auctioneering business". He made his comeback in 1919 with the exhibition of 'Phoebe the Strange Girl' in Birmingham and Margate.

=== Final years and death ===
Norman died of throat cancer on 24 August 1930 at Croydon Hospital, aged 70, and was buried at Mitcham Road Cemetery in Croydon. Five of his children followed him into circus careers: George and Arthur Norman became circus clowns while Tom and Jim Norman worked in fairgrounds. Ralph Van Norman (known professionally as Hal Denver) became a travelling Wild West performer, appearing throughout Europe and the United States.

== Portrayals ==
Norman was depicted in David Lynch's 1980 film The Elephant Man by Freddie Jones, although here, he was named Mr. Bytes, and portrayed as cruel in accordance with the discredited description in Treves' writings which were used as reference by the filmmakers.

== Bibliography ==
- The Penny Showman: Memoirs of Tom Norman 'Silver King', London: G.B. Norman-Noakes, 1985, OCLC 41103687
- Durbach, Nadja (2009), The Spectacle of Deformity: Freak Shows and Modern British Culture, Berkeley: University of California Press, ISBN 978-0-520-25768-9, OCLC 314839375
- Howell, Michael; Ford, Peter (1992), The True History of the Elephant Man (3rd ed.), London: Penguin Books, ISBN 978-0-7490-0516-0, OCLC 59509221
