= Eric Bergren =

American screenwriter

Eric Lee Bergren (April 27, 1954 – July 14, 2016) was an American screenwriter.

== Early life and career ==
Bergren was born 1954 in Pasadena, California. He studied theatre arts at the University of Southern California.

Based on works of Frederick Treves and Ashley Montagu about Joseph Merrick, Bergren wrote the script for the 1980 film The Elephant Man together with director David Lynch and fellow screenwriter Christopher De Vore. At the 53rd Academy Awards, Bergren, Lynch and De Vore were nominated for an Academy Award for Best Adapted Screenplay. It was also nominated for the Golden Globe Award for Best Screenplay, the BAFTA Award for Best Screenplay and the Writers Guild of America Award for Best Adapted Screenplay.

Together with Christopher De Vore and Nicholas Kazan, Bergren also wrote the script for Frances, a biopic about American actress and television host Frances Farmer.

In 1988, he directed the short film ...They Haven't Seen This..., based on his own script.

== Death ==
Bergren died on July 14, 2016, aged 62, in Pasadena due to complications from stage 4 liver cancer, which had been diagnosed a few months earlier. He was survived by his ex-wife, Sheila Condit, and two daughters Erin Condit-Bergren and Elysse Condit.

== Filmography ==
- 1980: The Elephant Man
- 1982: Frances
- 1988: ...They Haven't Seen This... (short)
- 1991: The Dark Wind
- 1998: Little Girl Fly Away (TV film)
