= Clara Torr =

British music hall comedian

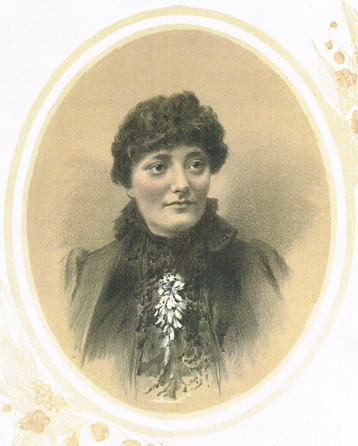
- Born: Clara Torr; September 1868; Nottingham, England
- Died: December 1934 (aged 66); Nottingham, England
- Occupations: music hall comedian, entertainer

Clara Torr (1868–1934) was a British music hall comedian.

== Biography ==
Torr was an English music hall comedian, soprano and dancer. She was the daughter of Sam Torr, a noted music hall entertainer, and Elizabeth Wood. Clara performed comic songs such as: "The Dear Old Stile" and "My Mother", which she also composed.
