= The Elephant Man (1980 film) =

1980 film made by David Lynch

- Theatrical release poster
- Directed by: David Lynch
- Screenplay by: Christopher De Vore; Eric Bergren; David Lynch
- Based on: The Elephant Man and Other Reminiscences by Frederick Treves; The Elephant Man: A Study in Human Dignity by Ashley Montagu
- Produced by: Jonathan Sanger
- Starring: Anthony Hopkins; John Hurt; Anne Bancroft; Freddie Jones; John Gielgud; Wendy Hiller
- Cinematography: Freddie Francis
- Edited by: Anne V. Coates
- Music by: John Morris
- Production company: Brooksfilms
- Distributed by: Columbia–EMI–Warner Distributors (United Kingdom); Paramount Pictures (United States)
- Release dates: October 3, 1980 (New York City); October 10, 1980 (United States)
- Running time: 123 minutes
- Countries: United Kingdom; United States
- Language: English
- Budget: $5 million
- Box office: $26.1 million (North America)

The Elephant Man is a 1980 historical drama film loosely based on the life of Joseph Merrick (named "John" in the film), a severely deformed man who lived in London in the late 19th century. A co-production between the United Kingdom and the United States, the film was directed by David Lynch, produced by Jonathan Sanger, and executive produced by Mel Brooks (who was uncredited, to avoid audiences expecting the film to be like his usual comedic works, although his company Brooksfilms is in the opening credits). It stars John Hurt, Anthony Hopkins, Anne Bancroft, John Gielgud, Wendy Hiller, Michael Elphick, Hannah Gordon, and Freddie Jones.

The screenplay was adapted by Lynch, Christopher De Vore, and Eric Bergren from Frederick Treves' The Elephant Man and Other Reminiscences (1923) and Ashley Montagu's The Elephant Man: A Study in Human Dignity (1971), incorporating both historical and fictionalized aspects with Lynch's distinctive surrealist sequences, which is highly unusual for a biographical film. It was shot in black-and-white by Freddie Francis and featured make-up work by Christopher Tucker.

The Elephant Man was a critical and commercial success, with critics highlighting Lynch's direction and Hurt's performance. The film garnered several accolades including three BAFTA Awards (including Best Film), and nominations for eight Academy Awards and four Golden Globe Awards. After receiving widespread criticism for failing to honor the make-up effects, the Academy of Motion Picture Arts and Sciences was prompted to create a competitive award for Best Makeup the following year.

== Plot ==
Frederick Treves, a surgeon at the London Hospital, finds John Merrick in a Victorian freak show in London's East End, where he is kept by Mr. Bytes, the brutish ringmaster. Merrick's head is kept hooded outside of shows, and Bytes, who views him as intellectually disabled due to his muteness, is paid by Treves to have him brought to the hospital for examination.

Treves presents Merrick to his colleagues and highlights his physical abnormalities; his deformed skull forces him to sleep with his head on his knees against a pile of pillows, since if he were to lie down, he would asphyxiate. On Merrick's return, he is beaten so badly by Bytes that his errand boy has to call Treves for medical help. Treves brings Merrick back to the hospital, where he is tended to by hospital matron Mrs. Mothershead, as the other nurses are too frightened of him. Mr. Carr Gomm, the hospital's Governor, is against housing Merrick, as the hospital does not accept "incurables". Treves encourages Merrick to speak, finding him to be intellectually competent.

To prove that Merrick can make progress, Treves trains him to say a few conversational sentences and part of the 23rd Psalm. Carr Gomm sees through this ruse but, as he is leaving, Merrick begins to recite the whole of the Psalm. Merrick tells the doctors that he knows how to read and has memorized the 23rd Psalm because it is his favourite. Carr Gomm permits him to stay, and Merrick spends his time building a model of a cathedral he can partially see from his window.

At tea with Treves and his wife, Ann, Merrick views photos of their family and in return shows them his mother's picture. He believes he must have been a disappointment to her, but hopes she would be proud to see him with friends. Merrick begins to take guests in his room, including the actress Madge Kendal, who gives him a copy of Romeo and Juliet; they play some lines from it and Kendal kisses Merrick.

Merrick quickly becomes an object of curiosity to high society, and Mrs. Mothershead expresses concerns that he is still being put on display as a freak for this audience. Treves begins to question the morality of his own actions. Meanwhile, a night porter named Jim starts selling tickets to locals who come at night to gawk at the "Elephant Man".

The issue of Merrick's residence is challenged at a hospital council meeting, but he is granted permanent residence after the governors' hospitality is commended by Queen Victoria, who sends word with her daughter-in-law Alexandra. However, during one of Jim's raucous late-night showings, Merrick is kidnapped by Bytes. Another night porter reports this to Treves, who confronts Jim about what he has done; Jim is then fired by Mothershead.

Bytes takes Merrick on the road as a circus attraction once again. During a show in Belgium, Merrick, who is weak and dying, collapses, causing a drunken Bytes to lock him in a cage at night and leave him to die. Merrick is released by his fellow freakshow attractions who are escaping Bytes. Upon returning to London, Merrick is harassed through Liverpool Street station by several young boys and accidentally knocks down a young girl. Merrick is chased, unmasked, and cornered by an angry mob. Before collapsing, he cries "I am not an elephant! I am not an animal! I am a human being! I am a man!"

Policemen return Merrick to the hospital. Treves apologises to Merrick for his ordeal, but Merrick says he is happy and his life fulfilled from all Treves has done. Treves and Mothershead take Merrick, accompanying Princess Alexandra, to see a pantomime. Kendal comes on stage afterwards and dedicates the performance to him, and a proud Merrick receives a standing ovation from the audience.

Back at the hospital, Merrick and Treves bid each other goodnight, and Merrick completes his cathedral model. He lies down on his back in bed, imitating a sleeping child in a picture on his wall, and dies. A vision of his mother quotes Lord Tennyson's "Nothing Will Die".

== Cast ==
- John Hurt as John Merrick, an intelligent, friendly, kind-hearted man who is shunned by society due to his severe deformity.
- Anthony Hopkins as Frederick Treves, a surgeon who takes John from the freakshow to be his patient in the hospital.
- Hannah Gordon as Ann Treves, Frederick's wife and one of the few people who only knew Merrick as innocent, and treated him with kindness instead of being frightened over his deformity.
- Anne Bancroft as Madge Kendal, a Victorian-era actress.
- John Gielgud as Francis Carr Gomm, an administrator of London Hospital.
- Wendy Hiller as Mrs. Mothershead, a matron for the nurses alongside Merrick.
- Freddie Jones as Mr. Bytes, a ruthless, alcoholic showman who exploits his acts and savagely abuses Merrick for his freak show. Bytes was based on Tom Norman.
- Frederick Treves (grandnephew of Dr Frederick Treves) as Alderman.
- Michael Elphick as Jim Renshaw, an unscrupulous, disgraced night porter of the hospital.
- Dexter Fletcher as Bytes' boy
- Helen Ryan as Alexandra, Princess of Wales
- John Standing as Fox
- Lesley Dunlop as Nora, Merrick's nurse
- Phoebe Nicholls (picture) and Lydia Lisle (footage) as Mary Jane Merrick
- Morgan Sheppard as man in pub
- Kenny Baker as plumed dwarf
- Pat Gorman as Fairground Bobby
- Pauline Quirke as prostitute
- Nula Conwell as Nurse Kathleen, one of Merrick's nurses

== Production ==
=== Development ===
Producer Jonathan Sanger optioned the script from writers Christopher De Vore and Eric Bergren after receiving the script from his babysitter. Sanger had been working as Mel Brooks' assistant director on High Anxiety. Sanger showed Brooks the script, and Brooks said he "read it through at one sitting and cried. It was the first time something like that had moved me since The Miracle Worker."

Brooks decided to help finance via Brooksfilms, his new company, which had just made its first film, Fatso. Brooks' personal assistant, Stuart Cornfeld, suggested David Lynch to Sanger.

Sanger met Lynch, and they shared scripts they were working on (The Elephant Man and Lynch's unrealized Ronnie Rocket). Lynch told Sanger that he would love to direct the script after reading it, and Sanger endorsed him after hearing Lynch's ideas. However, Brooks had not heard of Lynch at the time. Sanger and Cornfeld set up an Eraserhead viewing at a 20th Century Fox screening room; Brooks loved it and enthusiastically agreed for Lynch to direct. "Eraserhead made me feel he could handle melancholy and freaks and could use black and white film," said Brooks. "We want Elephant Man in black and white to minimise the horrific deformity and also to help us capture the feel of Victorian England."

By his own request, Brooks was not credited as executive producer to ensure that audiences would not expect a comedy after seeing his name attached.

A stage play about Merrick called The Elephant Man by Bernard Pomerance had debuted in 1977 and enjoyed a successful run on Broadway in 1979. This play was adapted as a television movie in 1982. It was not used as a source for the film. The producers of the play sued Brooks over the use of the title and he counter sued claiming it was public property.

=== Casting ===
Dustin Hoffman wanted the role of John Merrick, but Sanger rejected the idea, saying "We’re always going to be looking to see where the Elephant Man ends and Dustin Hoffman begins". Lynch considered his friend Jack Nance, who he worked with on Eraserhead, for the role, but he cast John Hurt in the role after seeing The Naked Civil Servant. At the time, Hurt was still making Heaven's Gate which had fallen badly behind schedule due to director Michael Cimino's perfectionism. Hurt spent so long waiting for something to do that he performed the role of Merrick in the interim before returning to Heaven's Gate to complete shooting.

=== Filming ===
The budget was $5 million, $4 million of which was raised from Fred Silverman of NBC. Part of this deal involved Brooks doing a one-hour special for NBC. The remainder came from EMI Films.

For his second feature and first studio film, albeit one independently financed, Lynch provided the musical direction and sound design. Lynch also tried to design the make-up himself, but the design did not work. The makeup, now supervised by Christopher Tucker, was based on direct casts of Merrick's body, which had been kept in the Royal London Hospital's private museum. The makeup took seven to eight hours to apply each day and two hours to delicately remove. John Hurt would arrive on set at 5 am and shoot his scenes from noon until 10 pm. After his first experience of the inconvenience of having to apply the makeup and perform with it, he called his girlfriend, saying, "I think they have finally managed to make me hate acting." Because of the strain on the actor, he worked alternate days.

The film is bookended with surrealist sequences, which is highly unusual for a biographical film according to studio executives, centered around Merrick's mother and her death. Lynch used Samuel Barber's Adagio for Strings to underline the climax and Merrick's own death. Composer John Morris argued against using the music, stating that "this piece is going to be used over and over and over again in the future... And every time it's used in a film it's going to diminish the effect of the scene."

=== Post-production ===
Following their return from England with a print, Lynch and Sanger screened The Elephant Man for Brooks, who suggested some minor cuts but told them that the film would be released as they had made it.

== Lawsuit ==
A West End play of the same name was enjoying a successful Broadway run at the time of the film's production. The producers sued Brooksfilms over the use of the title.

== Box office ==
The Elephant Man was a box office hit, grossing $26 million in the United States. In Japan, it was the second highest-grossing foreign film of the year with theatrical rentals of ¥2.45 billion, behind only The Empire Strikes Back.

== Reception ==
On review aggregator Rotten Tomatoes, it has an approval rating of 91% based on 67 reviews, with an average score of 8.6/10. The site's critical consensus reads, "David Lynch's relatively straight second feature finds an admirable synthesis of compassion and restraint in treating its subject, and features outstanding performances by John Hurt and Anthony Hopkins." On Metacritic, the film has a weighted average score of 78 out of 100 based on 16 critic reviews, indicating "generally favorable reviews". Audiences polled by CinemaScore gave the film a rare grade of "A+" on an A+ to F scale, making it the only Lynch film ever to achieve that grade.

Vincent Canby wrote: "Mr. Hurt is truly remarkable. It can't be easy to act under such a heavy mask ... the physical production is beautiful, especially Freddie Francis' black-and-white photography."

A small number of critics were less favourable. Roger Ebert gave it 2/4 stars, writing: "I kept asking myself what the film was really trying to say about the human condition as reflected by John Merrick, and I kept drawing blanks." In the book The Spectacle of Deformity: Freak Shows and Modern British Culture, Nadja Durbach describes the work as "much more mawkish and moralising than one would expect from the leading postmodern surrealist filmmaker" and "unashamedly sentimental". She blamed this mawkishness on the use of Treves' memoirs as source material.

The Elephant Man has since been ranked among the best films of the 1980s in Time Out (where it placed 19th), Paste (56th), and Rolling Stone (38th), and among the greatest biopics of all time. The film also received five votes in the 2012 Sight & Sound polls. The February 2020 issue of New York Magazine lists The Elephant Man as among "The Best Movies That Lost Best Picture at the Oscars."

=== Accolades ===
The Elephant Man was nominated for eight Academy Awards, tying Raging Bull at the 53rd Academy Awards, including Best Picture, Actor in a Leading Role (Hurt), Art Direction-Set Decoration (Stuart Craig, Robert Cartwright, Hugh Scaife), Best Costume Design, Best Director, Best Film Editing, Music: Original Score, and Writing: Screenplay Based on Material from Another Medium. However, it did not win any.

Industry experts were appalled that the film was not going to be honoured for its make-up effects when the Academy of Motion Picture Arts and Sciences announced its nominations at the time. A letter of protest was sent to the academy's Board of Governors requesting to give the film an honorary award. The academy refused, but in response to the outcry, they decided to give the make-up artists their own category. A year later, the Academy Award for Best Makeup category was introduced with An American Werewolf in London as its first recipient.

It won the BAFTA Award for Best Film, and other BAFTA Awards for Best Actor (Hurt) and Best Production Design, and was nominated for four others: Direction, Screenplay, Cinematography and Editing.

The film is recognized by American Film Institute in these lists:

- 2005: AFI's 100 Years...100 Movie Quotes:
  - John Merrick: "I am not an animal! I am a human being. I am a man." – Nominated

=== Home media ===
The film has been issued many times on VHS, Betamax, CED, LaserDisc and DVD. The first DVD was released on December 11, 2001, by Paramount Home Entertainment. The version released as part of the David Lynch Lime Green Box includes several interviews with Lynch and Hurt, and a Joseph Merrick documentary. This material is also available on the exclusive treatment on the European market as part of Optimum Releasing's StudioCanal Collection. The film has been available on Blu-ray since 2009 throughout Europe and in Australia and Japan but not in the US (however the discs will play in both region A & B players).

A 4K restoration (created from the original camera negative, supervised by Lynch) was carried out for the film's 40th anniversary, and was released in a director-approved special edition in both Blu-ray and DVD formats from The Criterion Collection in the United States on September 29, 2020. The restoration was also released on 4K Ultra HD Blu-ray (including a remastered Blu-ray) in the UK in April 2020. The Criterion Collection released their own 4K Ultra HD Blu-ray of the film on July 7th, 2026.

A tie-in novelization by Christine Sparks was published by Ballantine Books in 1980.

== Soundtrack ==
The musical score of The Elephant Man was composed and conducted by John Morris, and it was performed by the National Philharmonic Orchestra. In 1980, the company 20th Century Fox Records published this film's original musical score as both an LP album and as a cassette in the United States. Its front cover artwork features a masked John Merrick against a backdrop of smoke, as seen on the advance theatrical poster for the film.

In 1994, the first compact disc (CD) issue of the film score was made by the company Milan, which specializes in film scores and soundtrack albums.

Track listing for the first U.S. release on LP

Side one

1. "The Elephant Man Theme" – 3:46
2. "Dr. Treves Visits the Freak Show and Elephant Man" – 4:08
3. "John Merrick and Psalm" – 1:17
4. "John Merrick and Mrs. Kendal" – 2:03
5. "The Nightmare" – 4:39

Side two

1. "Mrs. Kendal's Theater and Poetry Reading" – 1:58
2. "The Belgian Circus Episode" – 3:00
3. "Train Station" – 1:35
4. "Pantomime" – 2:20
5. "Adagio for Strings" – 5:52
6. "Recapitulation" – 5:35

== In popular culture ==
Michael Jackson used excerpts from the film in his song "Morphine" from the 1997 remix album Blood on the Dance Floor: HIStory in the Mix.

The Jam's former bassist Bruce Foxton was inspired strongly by the film, and in response wrote the song "Freak" with the single's cover making a reference to the film.

Actor Bradley Cooper credits watching the film with his father as a child as his inspiration to become an actor. Cooper played the character in a Broadway revival of The Elephant Man play in 2014.

In season 3, episode 21 of The Simpsons, "Black Widower", Lisa daydreams of Aunt Selma's new boyfriend as the Elephant Man.

In season 4, episode 13 of Seinfeld, "The Pick", in defense of allegedly picking his nose, Jerry pleads to a surrounding crowd: "Are we not human? If we pick, do we not bleed? I am not an animal!"

The 1992 film Batman Returns parodies the iconic line "I am not an animal. I am a man." In one scene, the Penguin, after being called Oswald, angrily yells "I am not a human being! I am an animal!"

British TV presenter Karl Pilkington has often cited the film as his favorite, and has referenced it frequently during his appearances on The Ricky Gervais Show.

Musician Michael Stipe loves the film and cites it as an inspiration for the R.E.M. song "Carnival of Sorts (Boxcars)". Another R.E.M. song, "New Test Leper", quotes the line "I am not an animal."

Musician Mylène Farmer's song "Psychiatric" from the 1991 album L'autre... is a tribute to the film and John Hurt's voice is sampled throughout the song, repeating several times: "I'm a human being, I'm not an animal".

== See also ==
- The Elephant Man (1982 film)

== Bibliography ==
- Biderman, Shai; Tabeka, Assaf (2011). "The Monster Within: Alienation and Social Conformity in The Elephant Man". The Philosophy of David Lynch. University Press of Kentucky. p. 207. ISBN 9780813129914.
- Durbach, Nadja (2009). "Monstrosity, Masculinity, and Medicine: Reexamining The Elephant Man". The Spectacle of Deformity: Freak Shows and Modern British Culture. Berkeley: University of California Press. ISBN 9780520257689. OCLC 314839375.
