= Penny gaff =

19th-century English variety show

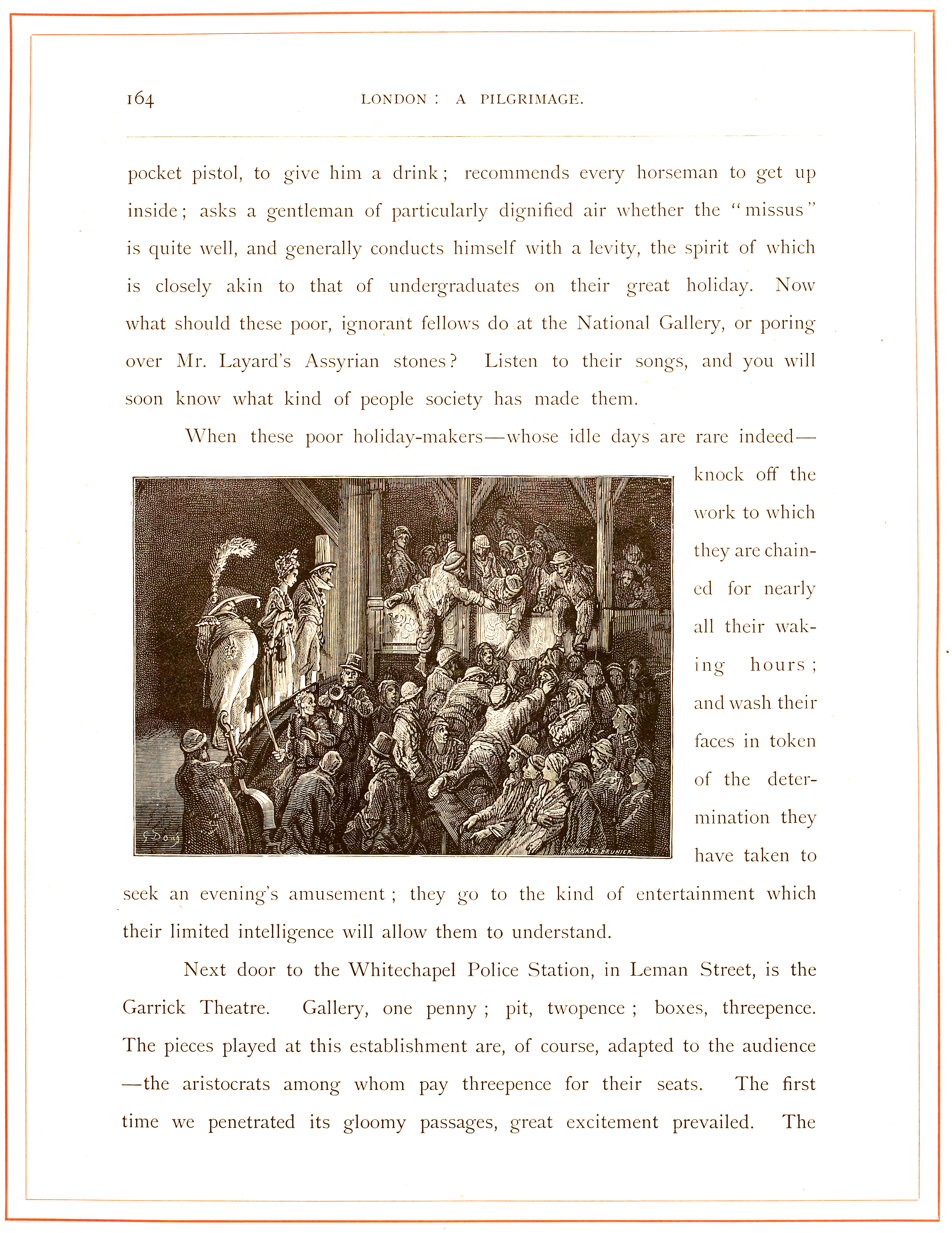
The penny gaff, by Gustave Doré in 1872

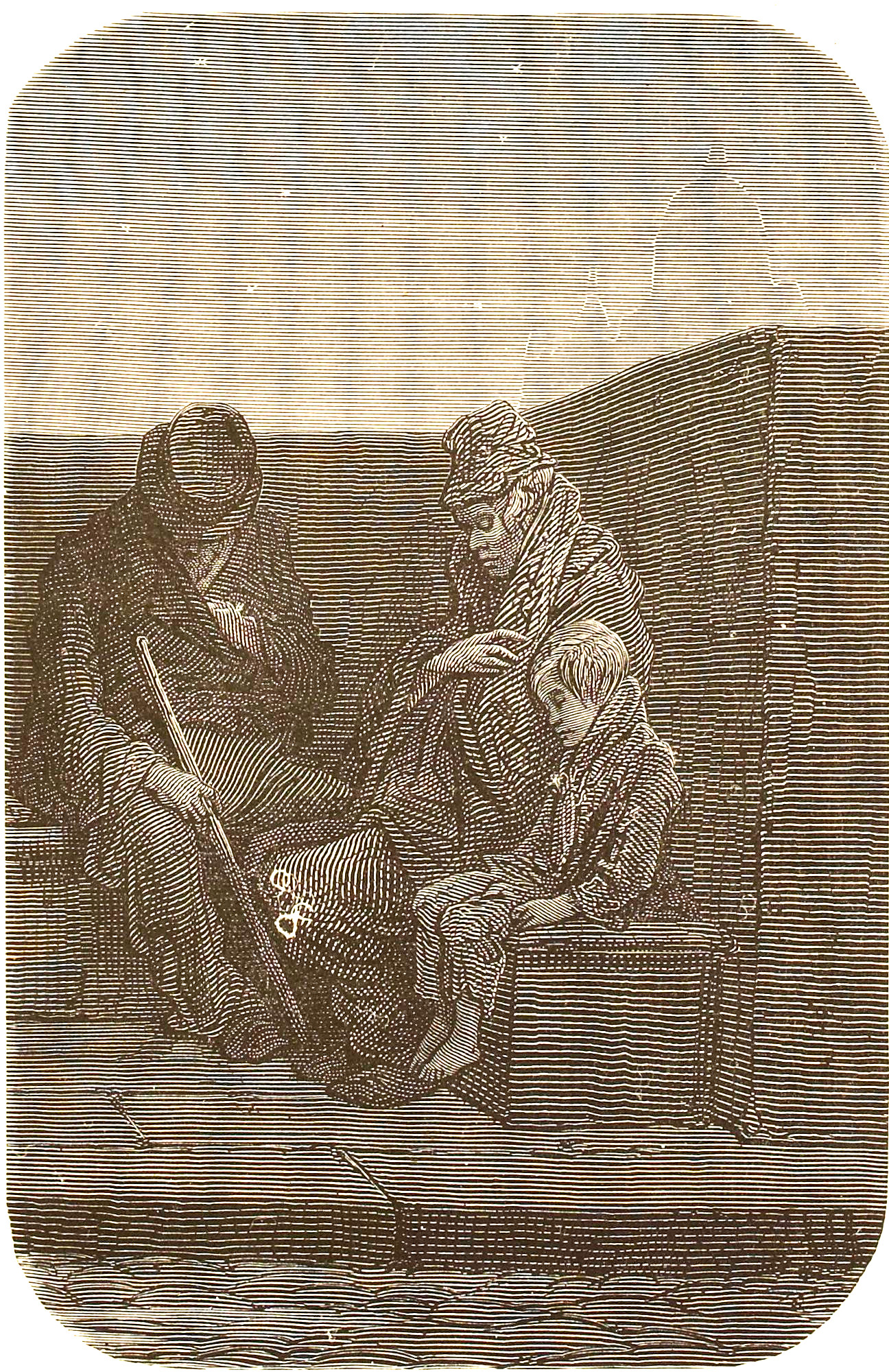
Penny gaff frequenters, by Gustave Doré

A penny gaff was a form of popular entertainment for the lower classes in 19th-century England. It consisted of short, theatrical entertainments which could be staged wherever space permitted, such as the back room of a public house or small hall. Unsophisticated, the props and scenery rarely consisted of more than a stage and a piano. The lessee of the venue would often stand by the stage, calling out when each act should finish in an attempt to maximise the evening's revenue.

Clowning, dancing, singing and plays were all featured in the penny gaffs. Easy to perform, well-known to the audience, and with simple exciting stories, the deeds of famous highwaymen, robbers and murderers, such as those featured in The Newgate Calendar were popular subjects for the plays. The stories of the 18th-century robber Jack Sheppard, who escaped from prison on numerous occasions, and the gory Red Barn Murder were among the most enduring. Mangled versions of William Shakespeare's plays were also regularly performed. The time constraints meant the stories would often become unrecognisable, with the final act performed in a flurry of activity. If the owner called time, the play would have to be concluded regardless of what point in the script the actors had reached. Joseph Merrick, the so-called Elephant Man, was exhibited at penny gaffs.

As the gaffs became more popular, larger, more spacious venues opened to accommodate them. The Rotunda in Blackfriars Road, the largest venue in London, could seat 1,000 people and at its peak exhibited shows lasting between an hour and two and a half hours. For the more discerning patron, it offered better seating at the price of tuppence or threepence. The established penny gaff theatres were feared as breeding grounds for criminals by the Victorian moral reformers, as, in the words of one city missionary: "no respectable person goes, so they have it all their own way, and corrupt the minds of youth without rebuke".

== Etymology ==
The name penny gaff derived from the entrance fee, which was normally one penny, and from the name for a cock fighting pit. The shows were popular from about 1830 to around 1870, by which time the street culture that had spawned the impromptu performances had largely disappeared.

== See also ==
- Patent theatre
