= Sir Frederick Treves, 1st Baronet =

British surgeon and writer (1853–1923)

Sir Frederick Treves, Bt
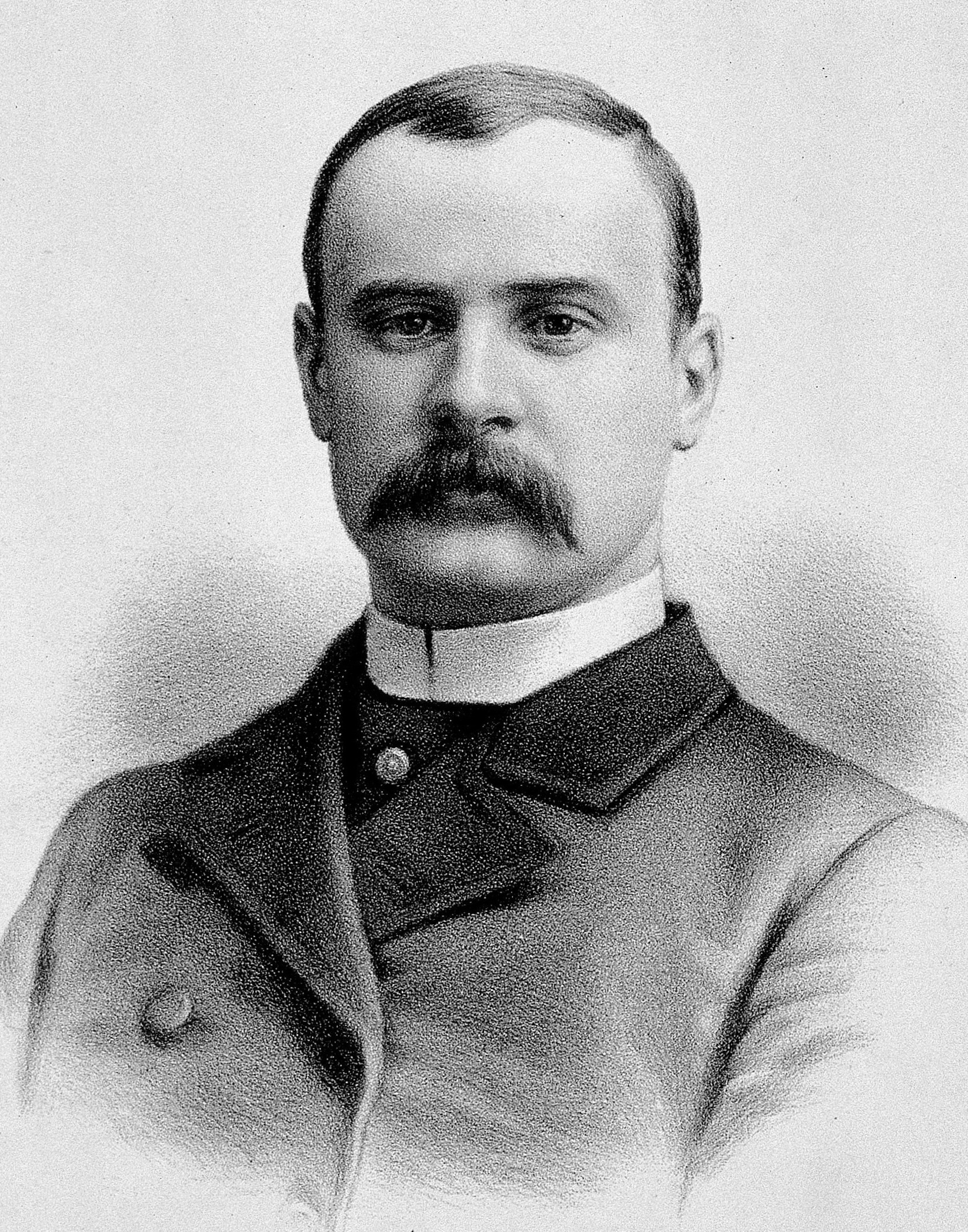
- Treves in 1884
- Born: 15 February 1853; Dorchester, Dorset, England
- Died: 7 December 1923 (aged 70); Lausanne, Switzerland
- Education: London Hospital Medical College
- Known for: Friendship with Joseph Merrick and saving the life of Edward VII
- Spouse: Ann Elizabeth Mason (m. 1877)
- Awards: Hunterian Professorship
- Scientific career
- Fields: Medicine, surgery

Signature
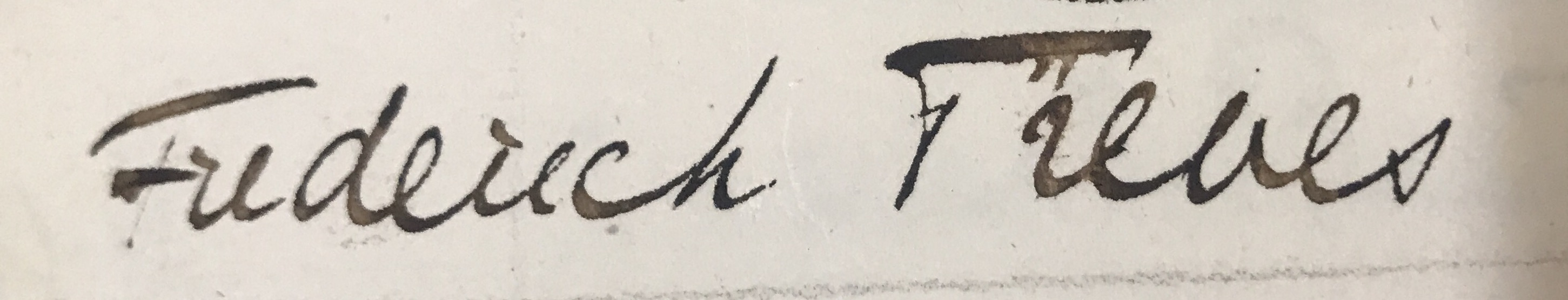

Sir Frederick Treves, 1st Baronet, GCVO, CH, CB, FRCS, KStJ (15 February 1853 – 7 December 1923) was a prominent British surgeon, and an expert in anatomy. Treves was renowned for his surgical treatment of appendicitis, and is credited with saving the life of King Edward VII in 1902. He is also widely known for his friendship with Joseph Merrick, dubbed the "Elephant Man" for his severe deformities.

== Life and career ==
Frederick Treves was born on 15 February 1853 in Dorchester, Dorset, the son of William Treves, an upholsterer, of a family of Dorset yeomen, and his wife, Jane (née Knight). As a small boy, he attended the school run by the Dorset dialect poet William Barnes, and later the Merchant Taylors' School and London Hospital Medical College. He passed the membership examinations for the Royal College of Surgeons of England in 1875, and in 1878 those for the fellowship of the Royal College of Surgeons (FRCS).

He was a Knight of Grace of the Order of St John.

=== Eminent surgeon ===
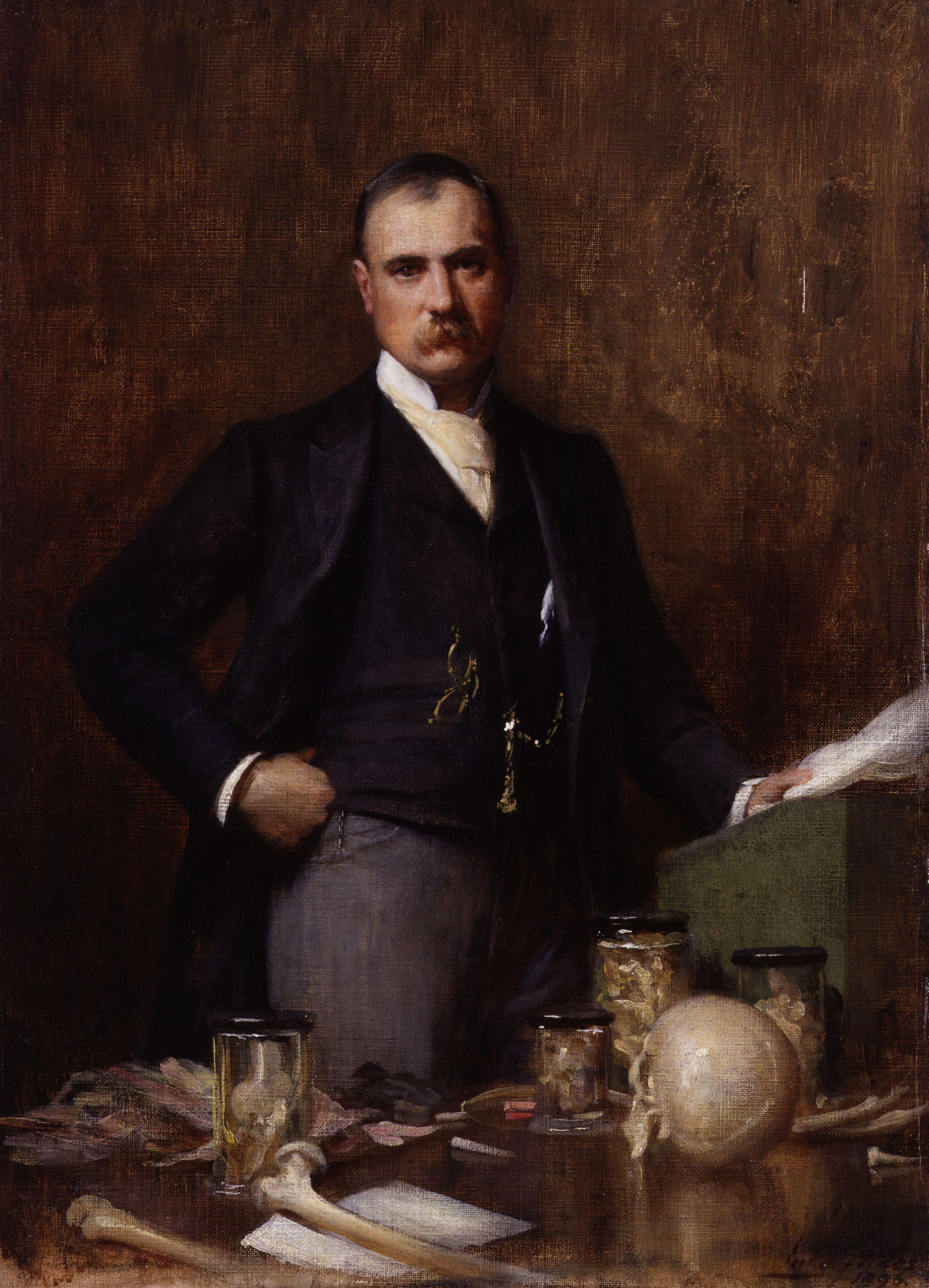
Painting of Treves by Luke Fildes in 1896

Treves began his medical career as a general practitioner, becoming a partner in a medical practice in Wirksworth, Derbyshire. His daughter was born in Wirksworth in 1878. The house he lived in on Coldwell Street is called Treves House. He moved to London where he became a surgeon, specialising in abdominal surgery, at the London Hospital in the late 19th and early 20th century. On 29 June 1888, he performed the first appendicectomy in England.

In 1884, Treves first saw Joseph Merrick, known as the Elephant Man, being exhibited by showman Tom Norman in a shop across the road from the London Hospital. Treves brought Merrick to the London Hospital in about 1886, having him live there until his death in April 1890. Treves' reminiscences mistakenly name Joseph Merrick as "John Merrick", an error widely recirculated by biographers of Merrick including the account rendered in the 1980 film.

In 1885, Treves was awarded the Hunterian Professorship.

After the outbreak of the Second Boer War in October 1899, Treves volunteered to work at a field hospital in South Africa, treating the wounded. He returned home on the SS Dunvegan Castle in March 1900, and later published an account of his experiences in The Tale of a Field Hospital, based on articles written at the time for the British Medical Journal. Treves was also Medical Officer to the Suffolk Yeomanry until he resigned in May 1902, and he accepted the appointment as Honorary Colonel of the Royal Army Medical Corps (Militia) on 30 August 1902.

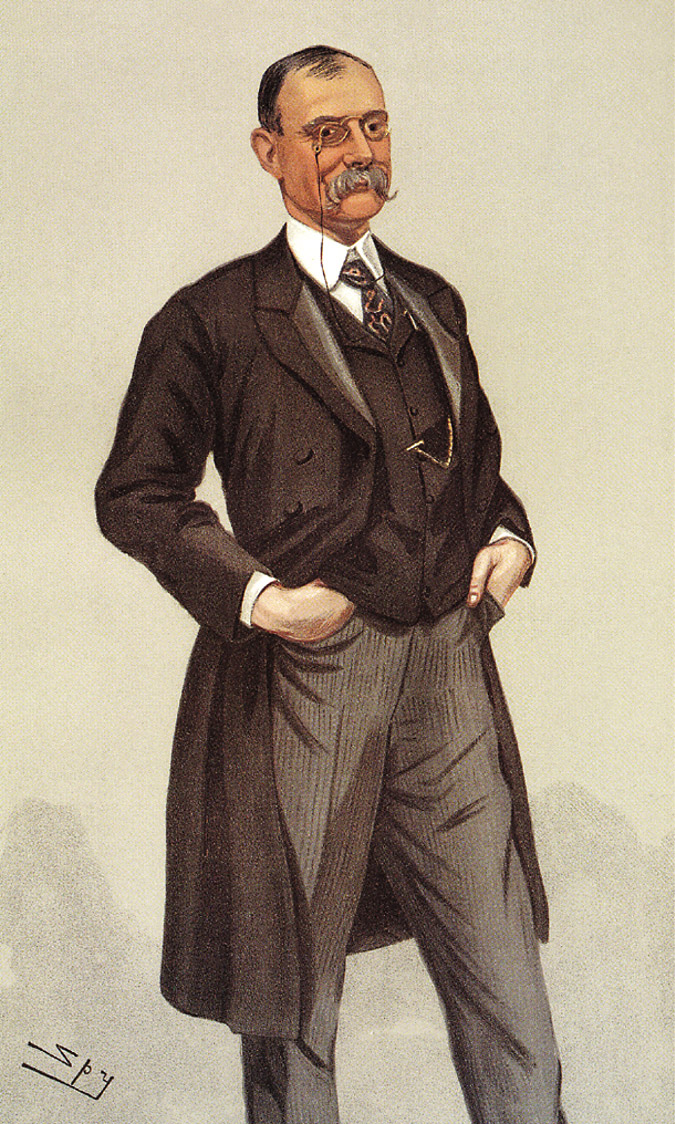
Vanity Fair caricature of Treves by "Spy" (1900)

In March 1900, Treves was appointed one of the Surgeons Extraordinary to Queen Victoria, and after her death the following year, he was appointed one of several Honorary Serjeants Surgeon to her successor, Edward VII. In May 1901 he was knighted as a Knight Commander of the Royal Victorian Order (KCVO).

The King's Achilles tendon was treated in January 1902, and then in June he found a "hard swelling in the abdomen". Treves did not remove the abscess, which was perityphlitis, an inflammation around the appendix which required draining. The coronation of the new king was scheduled for 26 June 1902, but on 24 June, Edward was diagnosed with appendicitis. Treves, with the support of the leading surgical authority, Lord Lister, performed a then-radical operation of draining the infected appendiceal abscess through a small incision and leaving the appendix intact. This was at a time when appendicitis was generally not treated operatively and carried a high mortality rate. The operation was carried out on a table in the Music Room at Buckingham Palace. Treves requested that London Hospital nurses Georgina Haines and Nurse Tarr should assist him; Haines nursed the King after his operation. The King had opposed surgery because of the upcoming coronation, but Treves insisted, stating that if he was not permitted to operate, there would instead be a funeral. The next day, Edward was sitting up in bed, smoking a cigar.

Treves was honoured with a baronetcy on 24 July 1902 (which Edward had arranged before the operation), and appendix surgery entered the medical mainstream in the UK. He was granted the use of Thatched House Lodge in Richmond Park and was subsequently able to take early retirement. He published a book about his experiences of the king's illnesses shortly after the coronation. Treves continued to serve the royal family as Serjeant Surgeon to the King and to the Royal Household from July 1902 until 1910.

Treves received the Freedom of the Borough from his native town of Dorchester in July 1902.

=== Author and legacy ===
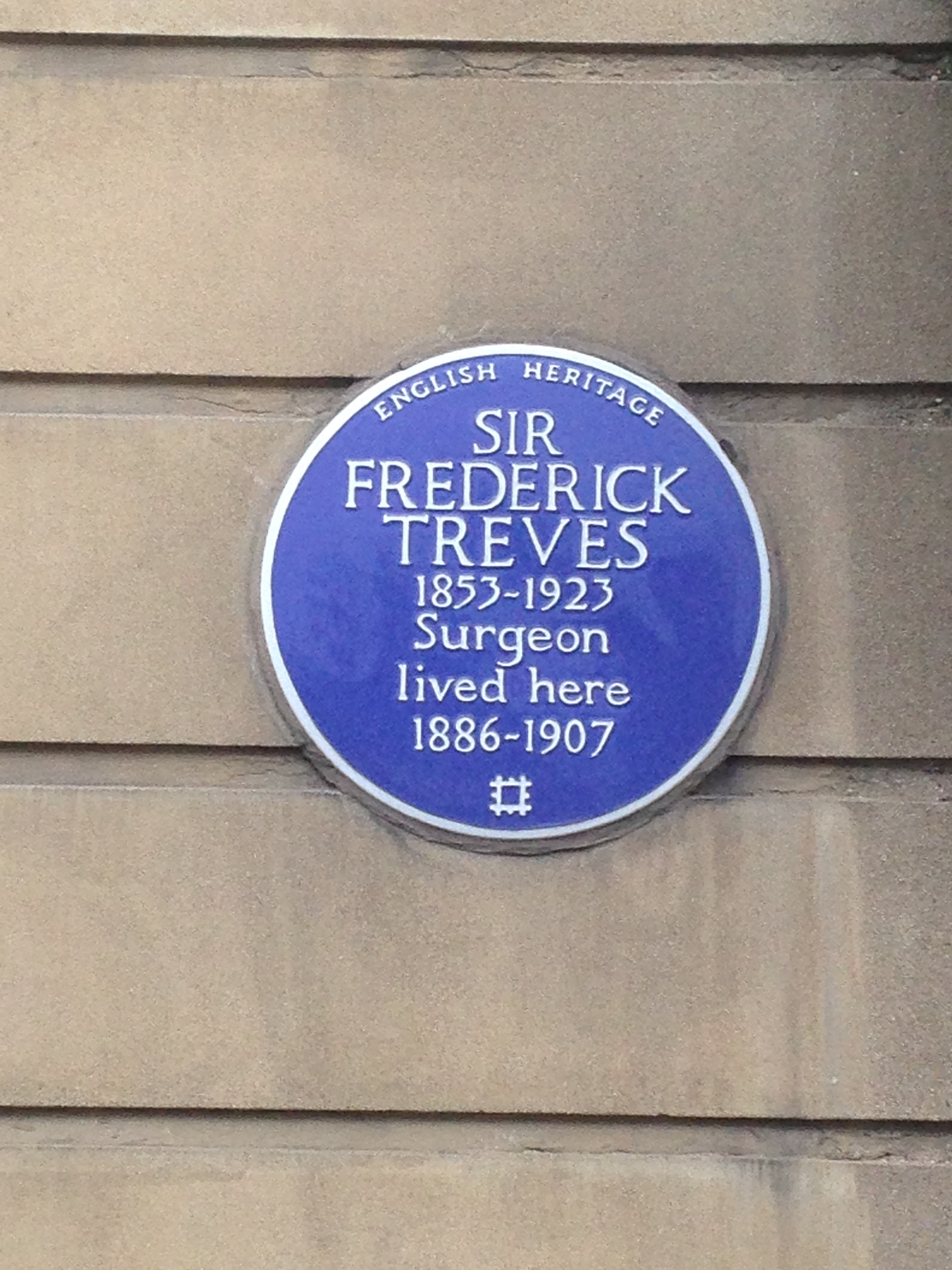
Treves' blue plaque at 6, Wimpole Street, Marylebone, London

Treves' ability as an author was discovered by Malcolm Morris of Cassell & Co. He wrote many books, including The Elephant Man and Other Reminiscences (1923), Surgically Applied Anatomy (1883), Highways and Byways in Dorset (the county in which he was born) (1906), A Student's Handbook of Surgical Operations (1892), Uganda for a Holiday, The Land That is Desolate, and The Cradle of the Deep (1908). This last volume is an account of his travels in the West Indies, interspersed with portions of their histories; describing (among other things) the death of Blackbeard the pirate, the 1902 eruption of Mount Pelée (which destroyed the city of Saint-Pierre, Martinique), and a powerful earthquake at Kingston, Jamaica, shortly before he landed there. He was also chairman of the Executive Committee from 1905 to 1912 of the British Red Cross, and was the first president of the Society of Dorset Men. From 1905 to 1908, he was Rector of the University of Aberdeen. Early in the First World War, drawing on his Boer War experience, he travelled to France as an advisor to the War Office and to report on medical care for the British Red Cross.

Around 1920, Sir Frederick went to live in Switzerland, where he died in Lausanne on 7 December 1923 at the age of 70. He died from peritonitis, which in the days before antibiotics commonly resulted from a ruptured appendix. His funeral took place at St Peter's Church, Dorchester, on 2 January 1924; King George V and Queen Mary were represented by the Physician-in-Ordinary, Lord Dawson. His lifelong friend Thomas Hardy attended and chose the hymns. Hardy also wrote a poem for the occasion which was published in The Times; it begins: "In the evening, when the world knew he was dead". His ashes were buried in Dorchester (Weymouth Avenue) cemetery.

== Family ==
In 1877, Treves married Ann Elizabeth, daughter of Alfred Samuel Mason, of Dorchester. They had two daughters, Enid Margery Treves – who married in 1902 Lt-Col Charles Delmé-Radcliffe, CMG, MVO – and Hetty Marion Treves (1882–1900).

== Fictional portrayals ==
Treves is one of the main characters in The Elephant Man, Bernard Pomerance's 1977 play about Joseph Merrick's life, as well as David Lynch's 1980 film, in which he was portrayed by Anthony Hopkins. In that film, the English actor Frederick Treves, Sir Frederick's great-nephew, plays an alderman. Working at the London Hospital and coming into contact with criminal cases, he is also depicted by Paul Ready in the BBC historical crime drama Ripper Street, set in the East End in the 1890s.

A fictional version of The Tale of a Field Hospital and Treves are featured in an episode of horror fiction podcast The Magnus Archives by Jonathan Sims.

In real life, Sir Frederick Treves appeared as himself amongst other society Britons helping out with the war effort in D. W. Griffith's lost silent film The Great Love (1918).

Academic offices
Preceded by Charles Ritchie	Rector of the University of Aberdeen; 1905–1908	Succeeded by H. H. Asquith
Baronetage of the United Kingdom
New creation	Baronet (of Dorchester); 1902–1923	Extinct
Preceded by Tomlinson baronets	Treves baronets of Dorchester; 24 July 1902	Succeeded by Chisholm baronets
