= List of awards and nominations received by Christine Baranski =

Christine Baranski awards
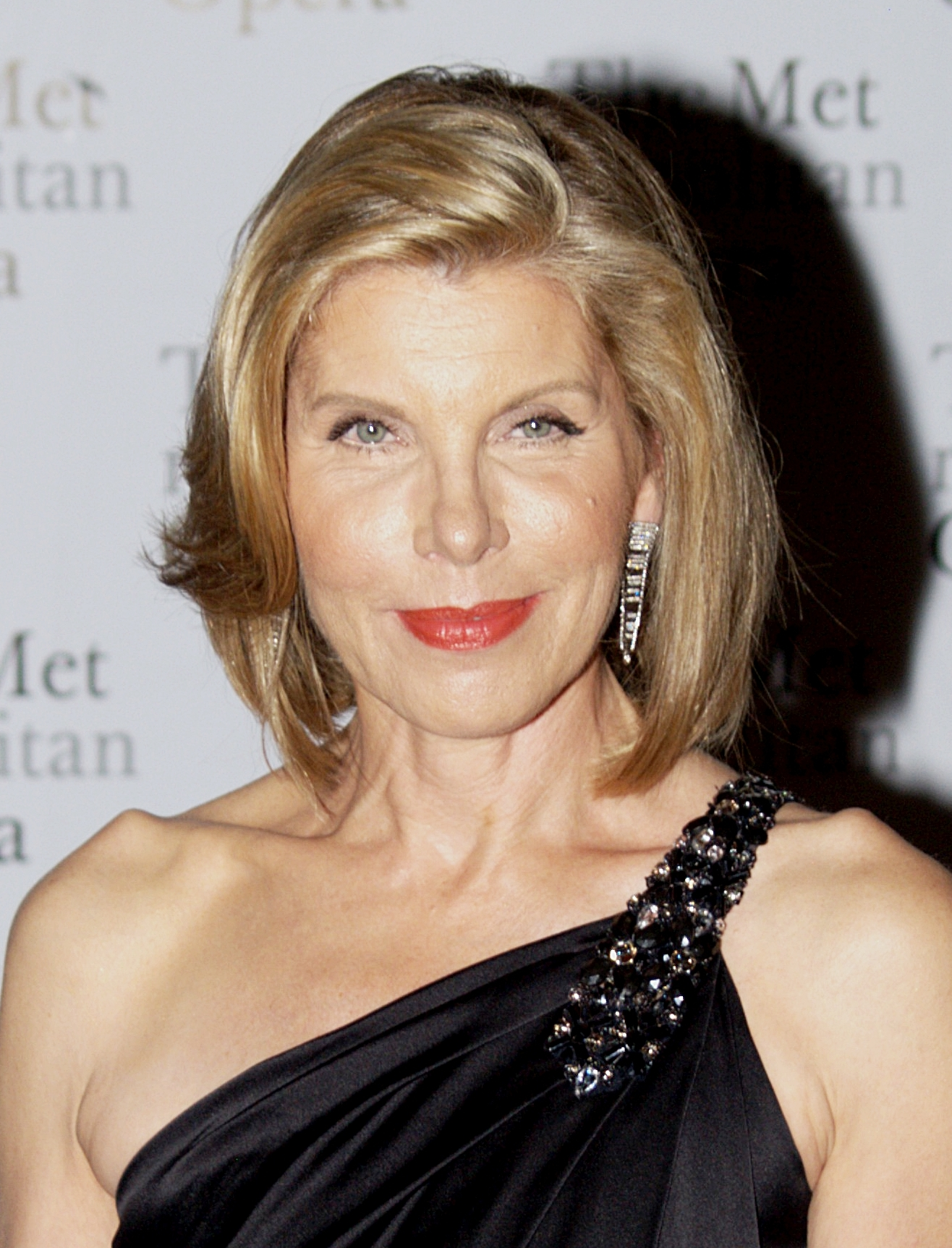
Totals
Award	Wins	Nominations
American Comedy Awards	1	2
Blockbuster Entertainment Awards	0	1
Critics' Choice Awards	1	11
Drama Desk Awards	2	2
Emmy Awards	1	15
Golden Globes	0	3
NYWIFT Awards	1	1
PFCS Awards	0	1
SAG Awards	3	8
TCA Awards	0	2
Tony Awards	2	2
VQT Awards	1	2
Awards won	12
Nominations	50

This article is a List of awards and nominations received by Christine Baranski.

Christine Baranski is an American actress of the stage and screen. Over her extensive career, she has received numerous accolades including a Primetime Emmy Award, two Tony Awards, three Screen Actors Guild Awards, two Drama Desk Awards, and a Critics' Choice Movie Award, as well as nominations for three Golden Globe Awards and ten Critics' Choice Television Awards, the most for any performer.

For her work on television she has received fifteen Primetime Emmy Award nominations for her performances in Cybill, Frasier, The Big Bang Theory, The Good Wife and The Gilded Age. She also received three Golden Globe Award nominations. She received eight Screen Actors Guild Award nominations for her work in both film and television winning for Cybil in 1995, The Birdcage (1996), and Chicago (2002). For her work on the Broadway stage she received two Tony Award nominations and wins for her performances in The Real Thing in 1984 and Rumours in 1989.

== Major associations ==
=== Critics' Choice Awards ===
Year	Category	Nominated work	Result	Ref.
Critics' Choice Movie Awards (Note: Originally known as Broadcast Film Critics Association Awards.)
2002	Best Acting Ensemble (Note: Shared with the cast.)	Chicago	Won	
2015	Best Acting Ensemble	Into the Woods	Nominated	
Critics' Choice Television Awards
2012	Best Supporting Actress in a Drama Series	The Good Wife	Nominated	
2014	Best Supporting Actress in a Drama Series	The Good Wife	Nominated	
2015	Best Supporting Actress in a Drama Series	The Good Wife	Nominated	
2017	Best Supporting Actress in a Drama Series	The Good Wife	Nominated	
2018	Best Actress in a Drama Series	The Good Fight	Nominated	
2020	Best Actress in a Drama Series	The Good Fight	Nominated	
2021	Best Actress in a Drama Series	The Good Fight	Nominated	
2022	Best Actress in a Drama Series	The Good Fight	Nominated	
2023	Best Actress in a Drama Series	The Good Fight	Nominated	

=== Drama Desk Awards ===
Year	Category	Nominated work	Result	Ref.
1984	Outstanding Featured Actress in a Play	The Real Thing	Won	
1992	Outstanding Featured Actress in a Play	Lips Together, Teeth Apart	Won	

=== Emmy Awards ===
Primetime Emmy Awards
Year	Category	Nominated work	Result	Ref.
1995	Outstanding Supporting Actress in a Comedy Series	Cybill	Won	
1996	Outstanding Supporting Actress in a Comedy Series	Cybill	Nominated	
1997	Outstanding Supporting Actress in a Comedy Series	Cybill	Nominated	
1998	Outstanding Supporting Actress in a Comedy Series	Cybill	Nominated	
1999	Outstanding Guest Actress in a Comedy Series	Frasier	Nominated	
2009	Outstanding Guest Actress in a Comedy Series	The Big Bang Theory	Nominated	
2010	Outstanding Guest Actress in a Comedy Series	The Big Bang Theory	Nominated	
2010	Outstanding Supporting Actress in a Drama Series	The Good Wife	Nominated	
2011	Outstanding Supporting Actress in a Drama Series	The Good Wife	Nominated	
2012	Outstanding Supporting Actress in a Drama Series	The Good Wife	Nominated	
2013	Outstanding Supporting Actress in a Drama Series	The Good Wife	Nominated	
2014	Outstanding Supporting Actress in a Drama Series	The Good Wife	Nominated	
2015	Outstanding Supporting Actress in a Drama Series	The Good Wife	Nominated	
2015	Outstanding Guest Actress in a Comedy Series	The Big Bang Theory	Nominated	
2016	Outstanding Guest Actress in a Comedy Series	The Big Bang Theory	Nominated	
2024	Outstanding Supporting Actress in a Drama Series	The Gilded Age	Nominated	

=== Golden Globe Awards ===
Year	Category	Nominated work	Result	Ref.
1995	Best Supporting Actress – Television	Cybill	Nominated	
1996	Best Supporting Actress – Television	Cybill	Nominated	
2022	Best Actress – Television Drama	The Good Fight	Nominated	

=== Screen Actors Guild Awards ===
Year	Category	Nominated work	Result	Ref.
1995	Outstanding Ensemble in a Comedy Series	Cybill	Nominated	
1995	Outstanding Female Actor in a Comedy Series	Cybill	Won	
1996	Outstanding Female Actor in a Comedy Series	Cybill	Nominated	
1996	Outstanding Cast in a Motion Picture	The Birdcage	Won	
2002	Outstanding Cast in a Motion Picture	Chicago	Won	
2009	Outstanding Ensemble in a Drama Series	The Good Wife	Nominated	
2010	Outstanding Ensemble in a Drama Series	The Good Wife	Nominated	
2011	Outstanding Ensemble in a Drama Series	The Good Wife	Nominated	
2023	Outstanding Ensemble in a Drama Series	The Gilded Age	Nominated	

=== Tony Awards ===
Year	Category	Nominated work	Result	Ref.
1984	Best Featured Actress in a Play	The Real Thing	Won	
1989	Best Featured Actress in a Play	Rumors	Won	

== Miscellaneous awards ==
=== AARP Movies for Grownups Awards ===
Year	Category	Nominated work	Result	Ref.
2009	Best Supporting Actress (Note: Shared with Julie Walters.)	Mamma Mia!	Won	

=== American Comedy Awards ===
Year	Category	Nominated work	Result	Ref.
1996	Funniest Supporting Female in a Television Series	Cybill	Won	
2000	Funniest Female Guest Appearance in a Television Series	Frasier	Nominated	

=== Blockbuster Entertainment Awards ===
Year	Category	Nominated work	Result	Ref.
2000	Favorite Supporting Actress – Comedy	How the Grinch Stole Christmas	Nominated	

=== New York Women in Film & Television Awards ===
Year	Category	Nominated work	Result	Ref.
2011	Muse Award	Outstanding Vision and Achievement	Honored	

=== Online Film & Television Association ===
Year	Category	Nominated work	Result	Ref.
2009	Best Music, Adapted Song	Mamma Mia!	Nominated	

=== Phoenix Film Critics Society Awards ===
Year	Category	Nominated work	Result	Ref.
2002	Best Acting Ensemble	Chicago	Nominated	

=== Television Critics Association Awards ===
Year	Category	Nominated work	Result	Ref.
2019	Individual Achievement in Drama	The Good Fight	Nominated	
2023	Individual Achievement in Drama	The Good Fight	Nominated	

=== Viewers for Quality Television Awards ===
Year	Category	Nominated work	Result	Ref.
1996	Best Supporting Actress in a Quality Comedy Series	Cybill	Won	
1997	Best Supporting Actress in a Quality Comedy Series	Cybill	Nominated	
