= 7th Screen Actors Guild Awards =

- Awarded for: Outstanding motion picture and primetime television performances
- Date: March 11, 2001
- Location: Shrine Auditorium; Los Angeles, California
- Country: United States
- Presented by: Screen Actors Guild
- Website: www.sagawards.org

Television/radio coverage
- Network: TNT

The 7th Screen Actors Guild Awards, awarded by the Screen Actors Guild and honoring the best achievements in film and television performances for the year 2000, took place on March 11, 2001. The ceremony was held at the Shrine Exposition Center in Los Angeles, California, and was televised live by TNT.

The nominees were announced on January 30, 2001, by Lucy Liu and Cary Elwes at Los Angeles' Pacific Design Center.

== Winners and nominees ==
Winners are listed first and highlighted in boldface.

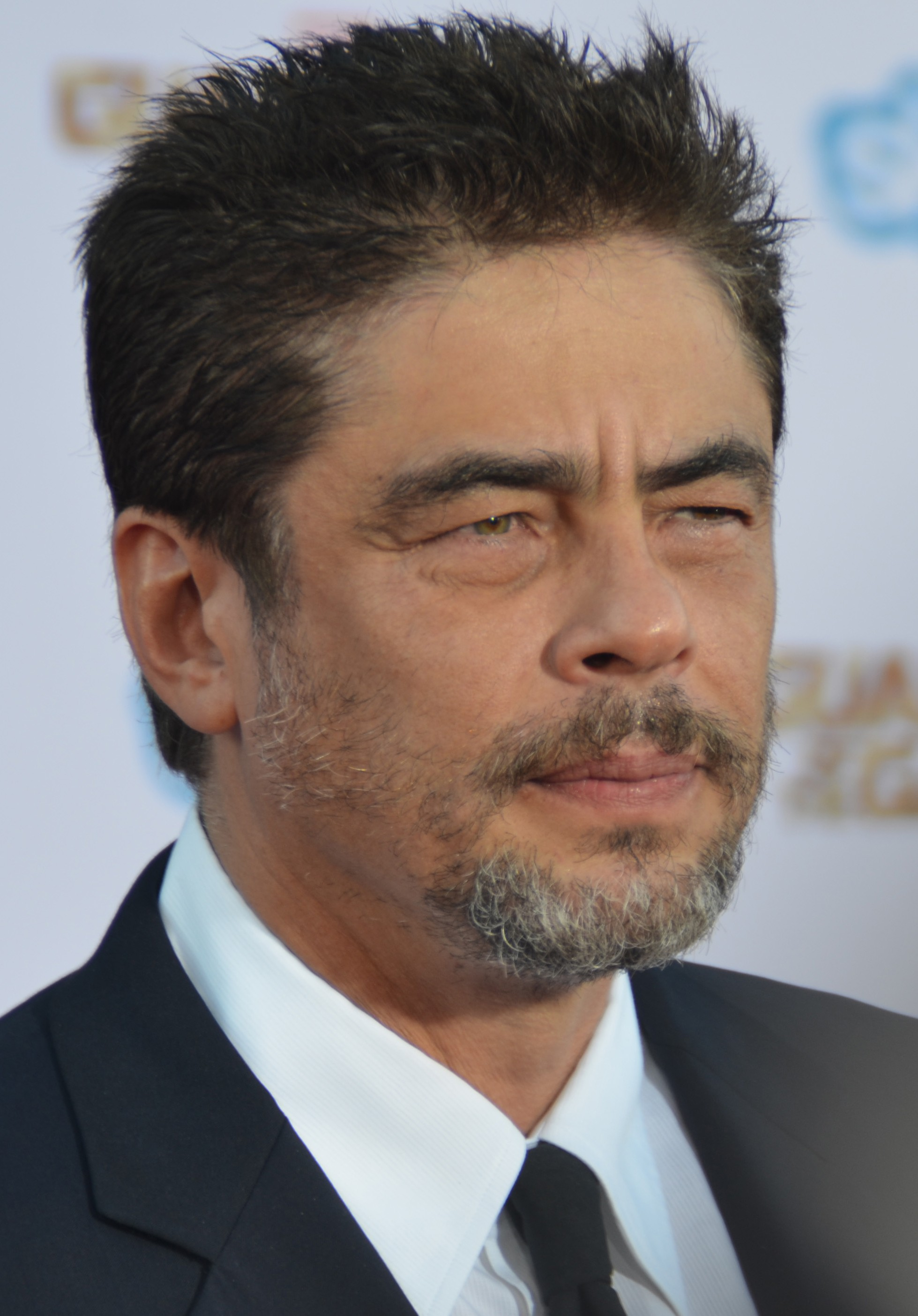
Benicio del Toro, Outstanding Performance by a Male Actor in a Leading Role winner

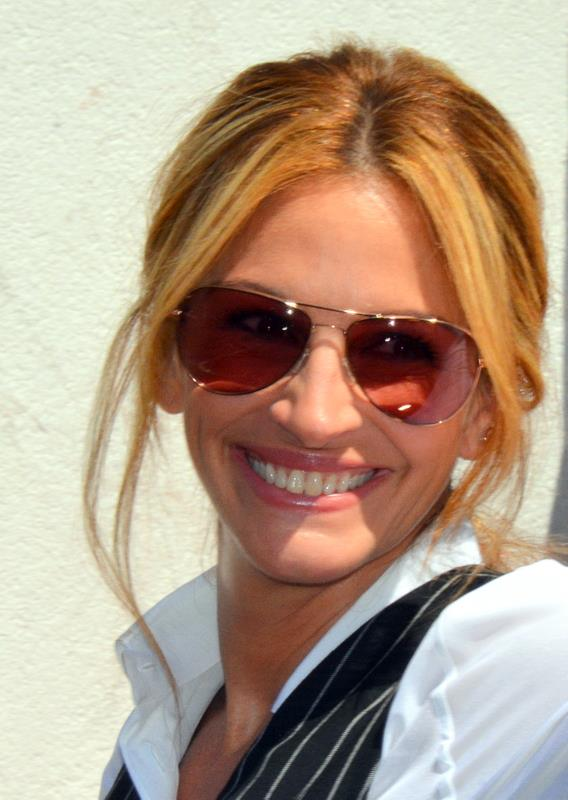
Julia Roberts, Outstanding Performance by a Female Actor in a Leading Role winner

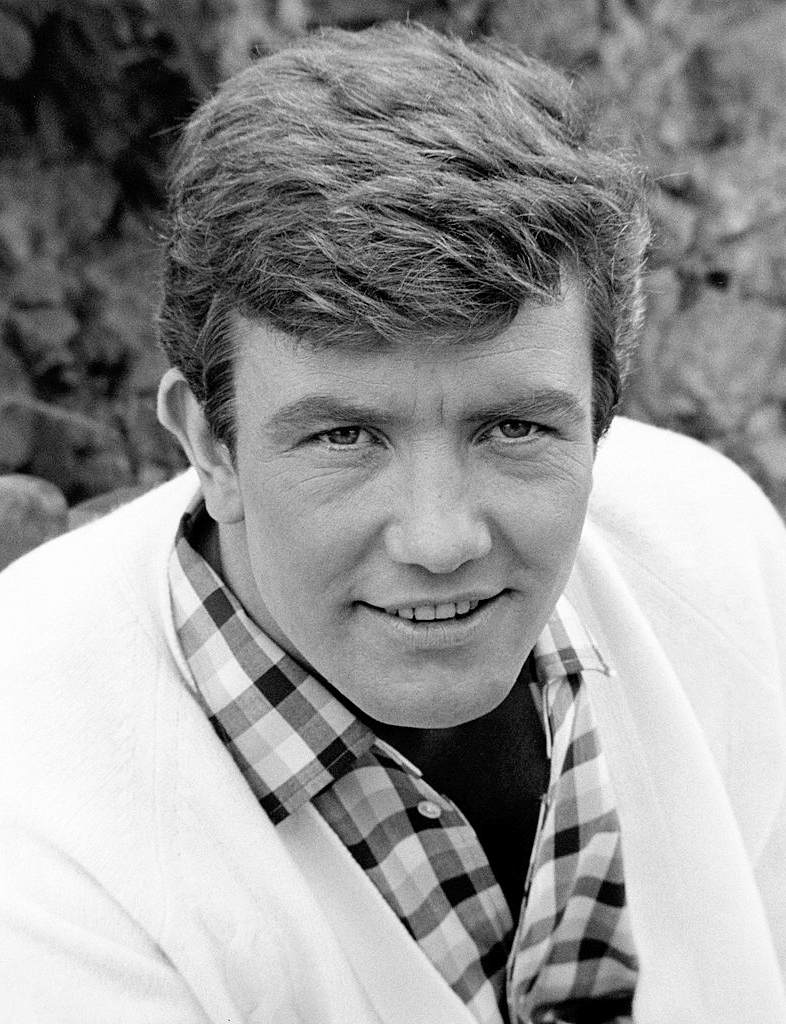
Albert Finney, Outstanding Performance by a Male Actor in a Supporting Role winner

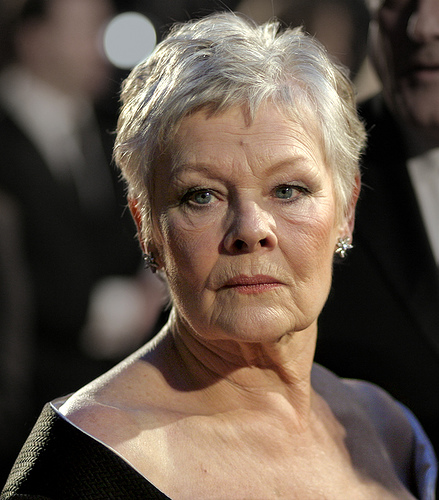
Judi Dench, Outstanding Performance by a Female Actor in a Supporting Role winner

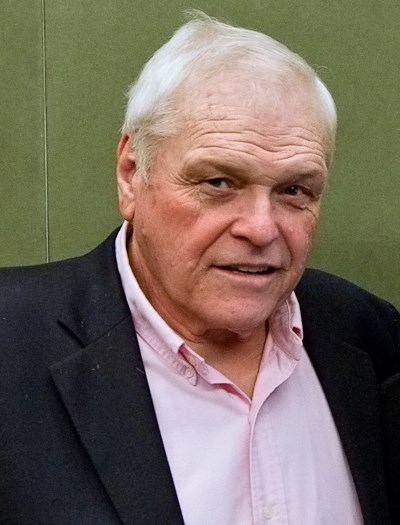
Brian Dennehy, Outstanding Performance by a Male Actor in a Miniseries or Television Movie winner

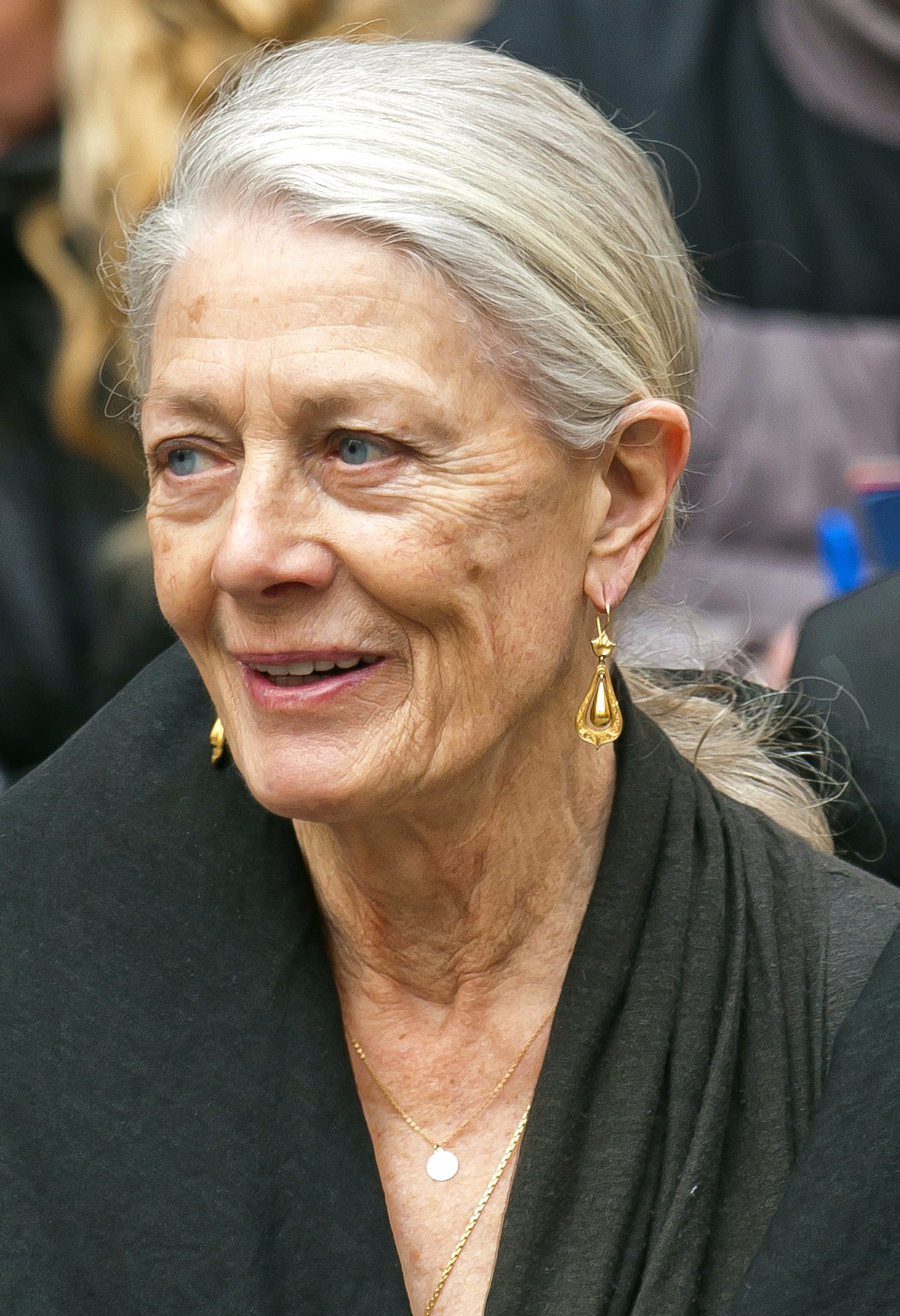
Vanessa Redgrave, Outstanding Performance by a Female Actor in a Miniseries or Television Movie winner

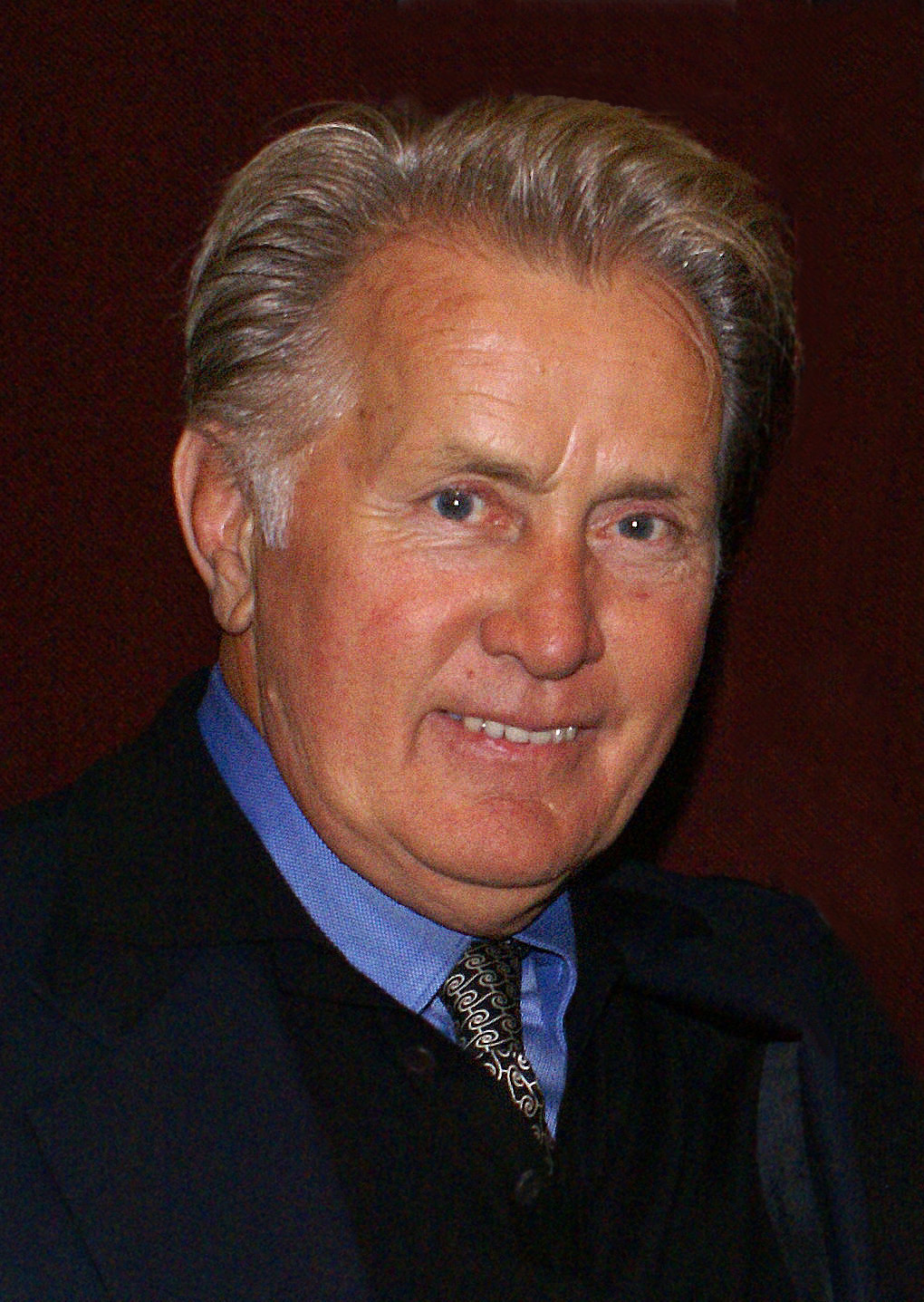
Martin Sheen, Outstanding Performance by a Male Actor in a Drama Series winner

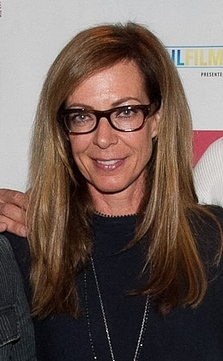
Allison Janney, Outstanding Performance by a Female Actor in a Drama Series winner

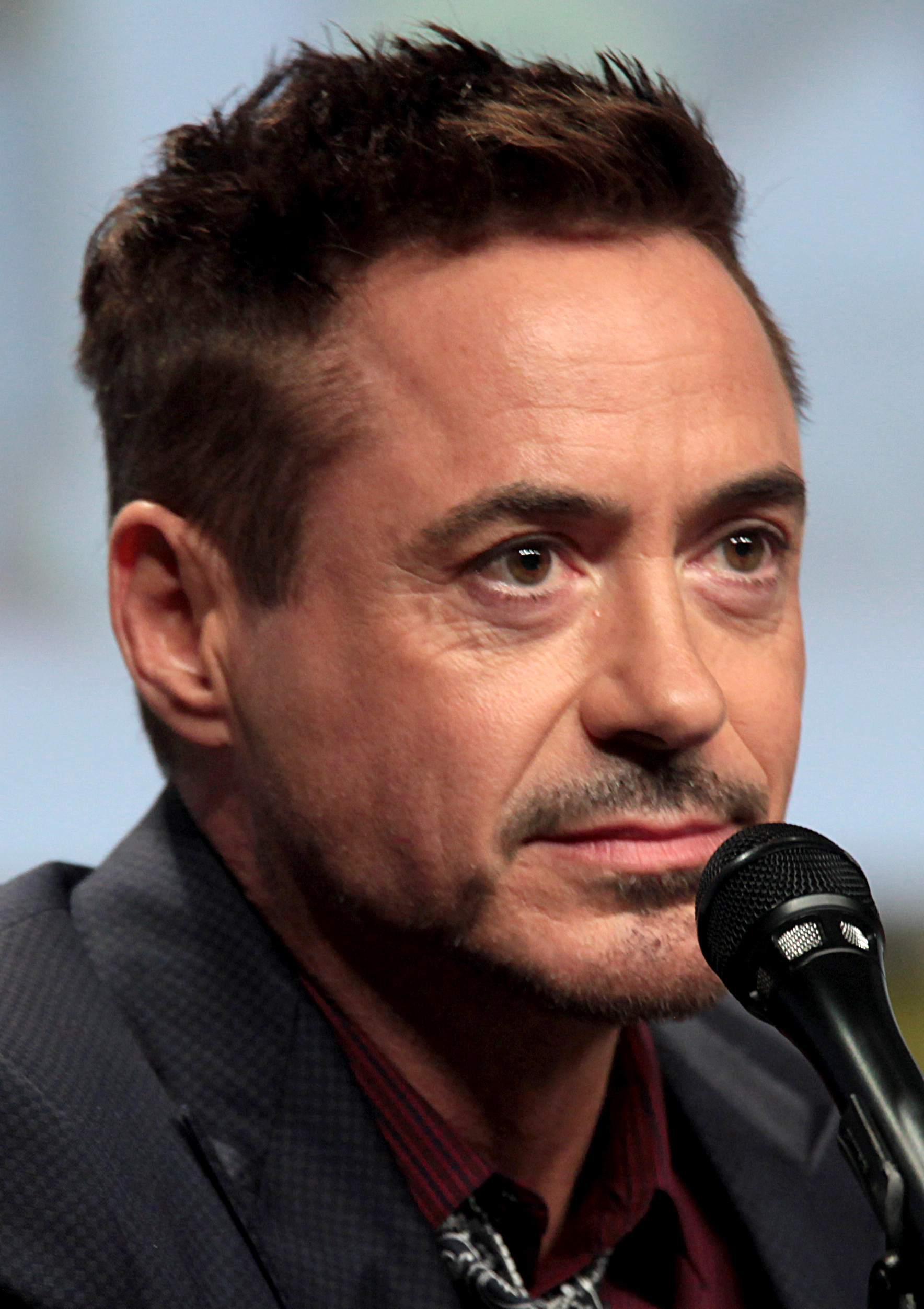
Robert Downey Jr., Outstanding Performance by a Male Actor in a Comedy Series winner

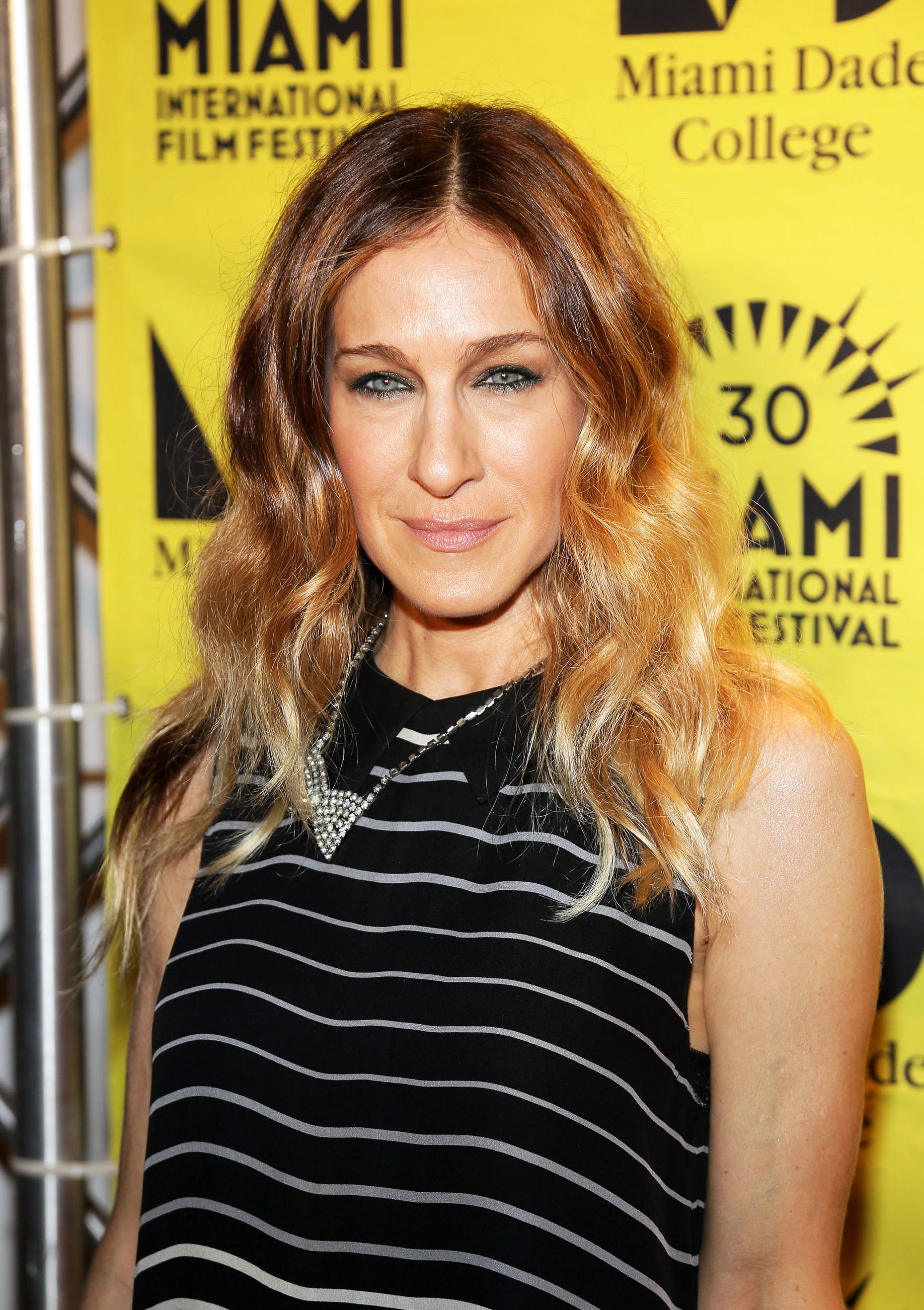
Sarah Jessica Parker, Outstanding Performance by a Female Actor in a Comedy Series winner

=== Film ===
Outstanding Performance by a Male Actor in a Leading Role	Outstanding Performance by a Female Actor in a Leading Role
**Benicio del Toro – Traffic as Javier Rodríguez**; Jamie Bell – Billy Elliot as Billy Elliot; Russell Crowe – Gladiator as Maximus Decimus Meridius; Tom Hanks – Cast Away as Chuck Noland; Geoffrey Rush – Quills as Marquis de Sade	**Julia Roberts – Erin Brockovich as Erin Brockovich**; Joan Allen – The Contender as Laine Hanson; Juliette Binoche – Chocolat as Vianne Rocher; Ellen Burstyn – Requiem for a Dream as Sara Goldfarb; Laura Linney – You Can Count on Me as Samantha "Sammy" Prescott
Outstanding Performance by a Male Actor in a Supporting Role	Outstanding Performance by a Female Actor in a Supporting Role
**Albert Finney – Erin Brockovich as Ed Masry**; Jeff Bridges – The Contender as Jackson Evans; Willem Dafoe – Shadow of the Vampire as Max Schreck; Gary Oldman – The Contender as Shelley Runyon; Joaquin Phoenix – Gladiator as Commodus	**Judi Dench – Chocolat as Armande Voizin**; Kate Hudson – Almost Famous as Penny Lane; Frances McDormand – Almost Famous as Mrs. Miller; Julie Walters – Billy Elliot as Mrs. Wilkinson; Kate Winslet – Quills as Madeleine "Maddy" LeClerc
Outstanding Performance by a Cast in a Motion Picture
**Traffic – Steven Bauer, Benjamin Bratt, James Brolin, Don Cheadle, Erika Christensen, Clifton Collins Jr., Benicio del Toro, Michael Douglas, Miguel Ferrer, Albert Finney, Topher Grace, Luis Guzmán, Amy Irving, Tomas Milian, D. W. Moffett, Dennis Quaid, Peter Riegert, Jacob Vargas, and Catherine Zeta-Jones**; Almost Famous – Fairuza Balk, Billy Crudup, Patrick Fugit, Philip Seymour Hoffman, Kate Hudson, Jason Lee, Frances McDormand, Anna Paquin, and Noah Taylor; Billy Elliot – Jamie Bell, Jamie Draven, Gary Lewis, and Julie Walters; Chocolat – Juliette Binoche, Leslie Caron, Judi Dench, Johnny Depp, Alfred Molina, Carrie-Anne Moss, Hugh O'Conor, Lena Olin, Peter Stormare, and John Wood; Gladiator – Russell Crowe, Richard Harris, Djimon Hounsou, Derek Jacobi, Connie Nielsen, Joaquin Phoenix, and Oliver Reed

=== Television ===
Outstanding Performance by a Male Actor in a Miniseries or Television Movie	Outstanding Performance by a Female Actor in a Miniseries or Television Movie
**Brian Dennehy – Death of a Salesman as Willy Loman**; Alec Baldwin – Nuremberg as Robert H. Jackson; Brian Cox – Nuremberg as Hermann Göring; Danny Glover – Freedom Song as Will Walker; John Lithgow – Don Quixote as Don Quioxte; James Woods – Dirty Pictures as Dennis Barrie	**Vanessa Redgrave – If These Walls Could Talk 2 as Edith Tree**; Stockard Channing – The Truth About Jane as Janice; Judi Dench – The Last of the Blonde Bombshells as Elizabeth; Sally Field – David Copperfield as Aunt Betsey Trotwood; Elizabeth Franz – Death of a Salesman as Linda Loman
Outstanding Performance by a Male Actor in a Drama Series	Outstanding Performance by a Female Actor in a Drama Series
**Martin Sheen – The West Wing as Josiah "Jed" Bartlet**; Tim Daly – The Fugitive as Dr. Richard Kimble; Anthony Edwards – ER as Dr. Mark Greene; Dennis Franz – NYPD Blue as Sgt. Andy Sipowicz; James Gandolfini – The Sopranos as Tony Soprano	**Allison Janney – The West Wing as C. J. Cregg**; Gillian Anderson – The X-Files as Dana Scully; Edie Falco – The Sopranos as Carmela Soprano; Sally Field – ER as Maggie Wyczenski; Lauren Graham – Gilmore Girls as Lorelai Gilmore; Sela Ward – Once and Again as Lily Manning
Outstanding Performance by a Male Actor in a Comedy Series	Outstanding Performance by a Female Actor in a Comedy Series
**Robert Downey Jr. – Ally McBeal as Larry Paul**; Kelsey Grammer – Frasier as Frasier Crane; Sean Hayes – Will & Grace as Jack McFarland; Peter MacNicol – Ally McBeal as John Cage; David Hyde Pierce – Frasier as Niles Crane	**Sarah Jessica Parker – Sex and the City as Carrie Bradshaw**; Calista Flockhart – Ally McBeal as Ally McBeal; Jane Kaczmarek – Malcolm in the Middle as Lois; Debra Messing – Will & Grace as Grace Adler; Megan Mullally – Will & Grace as Karen Walker
Outstanding Performance by an Ensemble in a Drama Series
**The West Wing – Dulé Hill, Allison Janney, Moira Kelly, Rob Lowe, Janel Moloney, Richard Schiff, Martin Sheen, John Spencer, and Bradley Whitford**; ER – Anthony Edwards, Laura Innes, Alex Kingston, Eriq La Salle, Julianna Margulies, Kellie Martin, Paul McCrane, Michael Michele, Ming-Na, Erik Palladino, Maura Tierney, Goran Vinsjic, and Noah Wyle; Law & Order – Angie Harmon, Steven Hill, Jesse L. Martin, S. Epatha Merkerson, Jerry Orbach, Sam Waterston, and Dianne Wiest; The Practice – Michael Badalucco, Lara Flynn Boyle, Lisa Gay Hamilton, Steve Harris, Jason Kravits, Camryn Manheim, Dylan McDermott, Marla Sokoloff, and Kelli Williams; The Sopranos – Lorraine Bracco, Dominic Chianese, Drea de Matteo, Edie Falco, James Gandolfini, Robert Iler, Michael Imperioli, Nancy Marchand, Vincent Pastore, David Proval, Jamie-Lynn Sigler, Tony Sirico, Aida Turturro, and Steven Van Zandt
Outstanding Performance by an Ensemble in a Comedy Series
**Will & Grace – Sean Hayes, Eric McCormack, Debra Messing, and Megan Mullally**; Ally McBeal – Lisa Nicole Carson, Portia de Rossi, Robert Downey Jr., Calista Flockhart, Greg Germann, Jane Krakowski, James LeGros, Lucy Liu, Peter MacNicol, and Vonda Shepard; Frasier – Peri Gilpin, Kelsey Grammer, Jane Leeves, John Mahoney, and David Hyde Pierce; Friends – Jennifer Aniston, Courteney Cox Arquette, Lisa Kudrow, Matt LeBlanc, Matthew Perry, and David Schwimmer; Sex and the City – Kim Cattrall, Kristin Davis, Cynthia Nixon, and Sarah Jessica Parker

=== Screen Actors Guild Life Achievement Award ===
- Ossie Davis and Ruby Dee

== Multiple nominations ==
=== Film ===
Nominations	Film
3	Almost Famous
3	Chocolat
3	The Contender
3	Gladiator
2	Billy Elliot
2	Erin Brockovich
2	Traffic
2	Quills

=== Television ===
Nominations	Program
4	Ally McBeal
4	Will & Grace
3	ER
3	Frasier
3	The Sopranos
3	The West Wing
2	Death of a Salesman
2	Nuremberg
2	Sex and the City

== Multiple wins ==
=== Film ===
Wins	Film
2	Erin Brockovich
2	Traffic

=== Television ===
Wins	Program
3	The West Wing

== In Memoriam ==
Philip Seymour Hoffman introduced this segment remember the members of the guild who died from the last ceremony:

- Walter Matthau
- Loretta Young
- Steve Reeves
- John Colicos
- Meredith MacRae
- Craig Stevens
- Ann Doran
- Dale Evans
- Gail Fisher
- Julie London
- David Dukes
- Douglas Fairbanks, Jr.
- Lila Kedrova
- George Montgomery
- Werner Klemperer
- Steve Allen
- Ray Walston
- Claire Trevor
- Marie Windsor
- John Gielgud
- Nancy Marchand
- Gwen Verdon
- Larry Linville
- Rosemary DeCamp
- Richard Mulligan
- Beah Richards
- Alec Guinness
- Richard Farnsworth
- Billy Barty
- Jason Robards
