= The House of Blue Leaves (film) =

- Written by: John Guare
- Directed by: Kirk Browning; Jerry Zaks
- Starring: Swoosie Kurtz; John Mahoney; Christine Baranski; Julie Hagerty; Ben Stiller; Richard Portnow
- Country of origin: United States
- Original language: English

Production
- Editor: Alfred Müller
- Running time: 113 minutes

Original release
- Network: PBS
- Release: 25 May 1987

The House of Blue Leaves is a 1987 television play adapted from the John Guare play of the same title.

== Summary ==
The telefilm is set in Sunnyside, Queens in 1965, the day of Pope Paul VI's visit to New York City. The black comedy focuses on Artie Shaughnessy, a zookeeper who dreams of making it big in Hollywood as a songwriter, and his wife Bananas, a schizophrenic destined for the institution that provides the play's title. Artie wants to take his girlfriend Bunny with him to Hollywood. The story features nuns eager to see the Pope, a political bombing, and Ronnie, Artie's son, a GI headed for Vietnam who goes AWOL.

== Cast and characters ==
Source:IMDb; tv.com

- Swoosie Kurtz – Bananas Shaughnessy
- John Mahoney – Artie Shaughnessy
- Christine Baranski – Bunny Flingus
- Julie Hagerty – Corrinna Stroller
- Ben Stiller – Ronnie Shaughnessy
- Richard Portnow – Billy Einhorn
- Debra Cole – Little Nun
- Patricia Falkenhain – Head Nun
- Jane Cecil – Second Nun
- Ian Blackman – MP / El Dorado bartender
- Brian Evers – The White Man / El Dorado bartender

== Production ==
The telefilm was directed by Kirk Browning and Jerry Zaks, and was filmed on-stage before a live audience at the Plymouth Theatre. The telefilm was broadcast in May 1987 on the PBS series American Playhouse.
