= John Mahoney =

American actor (1940–2018)

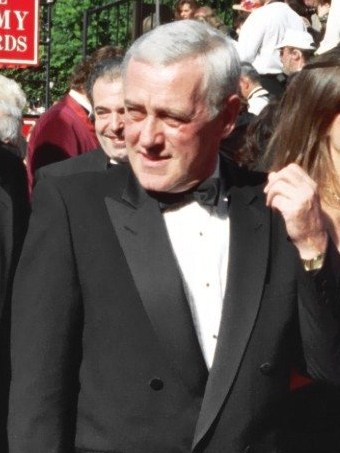
- Mahoney in 1994
- Born: Charles John Mahoney; June 20, 1940; Blackpool, Lancashire, England
- Died: February 4, 2018 (aged 77); Chicago, Illinois, U.S.
- Citizenship: United Kingdom; United States (after 1971)
- Occupation: Actor
- Years active: 1977–2017

Charles John Mahoney (June 20, 1940 – February 4, 2018) was an English-born American actor. He played retired police officer Martin Crane on the NBC sitcom Frasier from 1993 to 2004, receiving nominations for two Golden Globe Awards and two Primetime Emmy Awards.

After moving from England to the United States, Mahoney began his career in Chicago as a member of the Steppenwolf Theatre Company. He earned the Tony Award for Best Featured Actor in a Play for his performance in the 1986 Broadway revival of John Guare's The House of Blue Leaves, and went on to achieve wider recognition for his roles in the films Suspect and Moonstruck (both 1987). Other credits included Tin Men (1987), Frantic, Eight Men Out (both 1988), Say Anything... (1989), Barton Fink (1991), Striking Distance, In the Line of Fire (both 1993), Reality Bites (1994), The American President (1995), Primal Fear (1996), and The Broken Hearts Club (2000). He also voiced roles in animated films such as Antz (1998), The Iron Giant (1999), and Atlantis: The Lost Empire (2001).

== Early life and education ==
Charles John Mahoney was born in Blackpool, England, on June 20, 1940, the seventh of eight children. His father, Reg, was a baker who played classical piano, and his mother, Margaret (née Watson), was a housewife who loved reading. His paternal grandfather was Irish. The family had been evacuated to Blackpool from their home city of Manchester when it was heavily bombed during World War II. Mahoney started school at St Joseph's College.

After the war, the family moved back to Manchester, where Mahoney grew up in the suburb of Withington and discovered acting at the Stretford Children's Theatre. His parents' marriage was not happy. They would not speak to each other for long periods of time—and when they did, it often led to heated arguments. The family situation, combined with the war, fueled Mahoney's interest in acting and he vowed to leave Manchester.

Mahoney moved to the United States aged 18 in 1959, when his older sister Vera (a war bride living in rural Illinois, where he had visited in 1951) agreed to sponsor him. He studied at Quincy University before joining the United States Army. After graduating from Quincy, he lived in Macomb, Illinois, and earned his master's degree in English from Western Illinois University, where he went on to teach English in the late 1960s before settling in Forest Park, Illinois, and later in Oak Park, Illinois. He became a U.S. citizen in 1971 and served as an associate editor of the Quality Review Bulletin medical journal through much of the late 1970s.

Mahoney made a concerted effort to lose his English accent after joining the U.S. Army, not wanting to "stand out" in his new adopted country. He spoke with an American accent for the rest of his life.

== Career ==
=== 1977–1992: Rise to prominence ===
Dissatisfied with his career, Mahoney took acting classes at St. Nicholas Theatre, which inspired him to resign from his day job and pursue acting full-time. After a stage production in Chicago in 1977, John Malkovich encouraged him to join the Steppenwolf Theatre. He did so and went on to win the Clarence Derwent Award as Most Promising Male Newcomer in 1986. Steppenwolf founder Gary Sinise said in an interview for Bomb Magazine that Lyle Kessler's play Orphans in 1985 "kicked John Mahoney, Kevin Anderson and Terry Kinney off into the movie business" after their Steppenwolf performance of the play for which he won the Derwent Award and the Theatre World Award. Mahoney won Broadway's Tony Award for Best Featured Actor in a Play in 1986 for his performance in John Guare's The House of Blue Leaves.

Mahoney's first major film roles both came in 1987, in Barry Levinson's Tin Men and in Peter Yates' Suspect, a courtroom drama/mystery starring Cher, Dennis Quaid, and Liam Neeson. In the next decade, he had prominent roles in many acclaimed films including the John Patrick Shanley romantic comedy film Moonstruck (1987) starring Nicolas Cage and Cher. In 1988, Mahoney portrayed Kid Gleason in the sports drama Eight Men Out, and the following year portrayed the protective father in the Cameron Crowe teen coming of age film Say Anything... (1989). He portrayed Secret Service Director Sam Campagna in the Wolfgang Petersen directed drama In the Line of Fire (1993), Grant Gubler in Ben Stiller's romance film Reality Bites (1994), environmental lobbyist Leo Solomon in Rob Reiner's political romance film The American President (1995) and John Shaughnessy in the legal mystery thriller Primal Fear (1996). He also is known for his collaboration with the Coen brothers in films such as the period black comedy Barton Fink and the screwball comedy The Hudsucker Proxy. Mahoney also played a pivotal gay role in Greg Berlanti's 2000 GLAAD Media Award-winning film The Broken Hearts Club: A Romantic Comedy.

=== 1993–2004: Breakthrough in Frasier ===
Mahoney appeared in Frasier from its debut in 1993 until the final episode in 2004. He received two Emmy nominations and two Golden Globe nominations for the role of Martin Crane, the father of Frasier Crane and Niles Crane. NBC executives held Mahoney in such high esteem that Warren Littlefield declared he was pre-approved when the Frasier creative team suggested casting him as the father. Before appearing on the series, Mahoney had appeared in the episode "Do Not Forsake Me, O' My Postman" of Cheers – from which Frasier was a spinoff – as Sy Flembeck, an inept jingle writer who has a brief conversation with Frasier. Mahoney also appeared as a priest in Becker, which starred Cheers star Ted Danson.

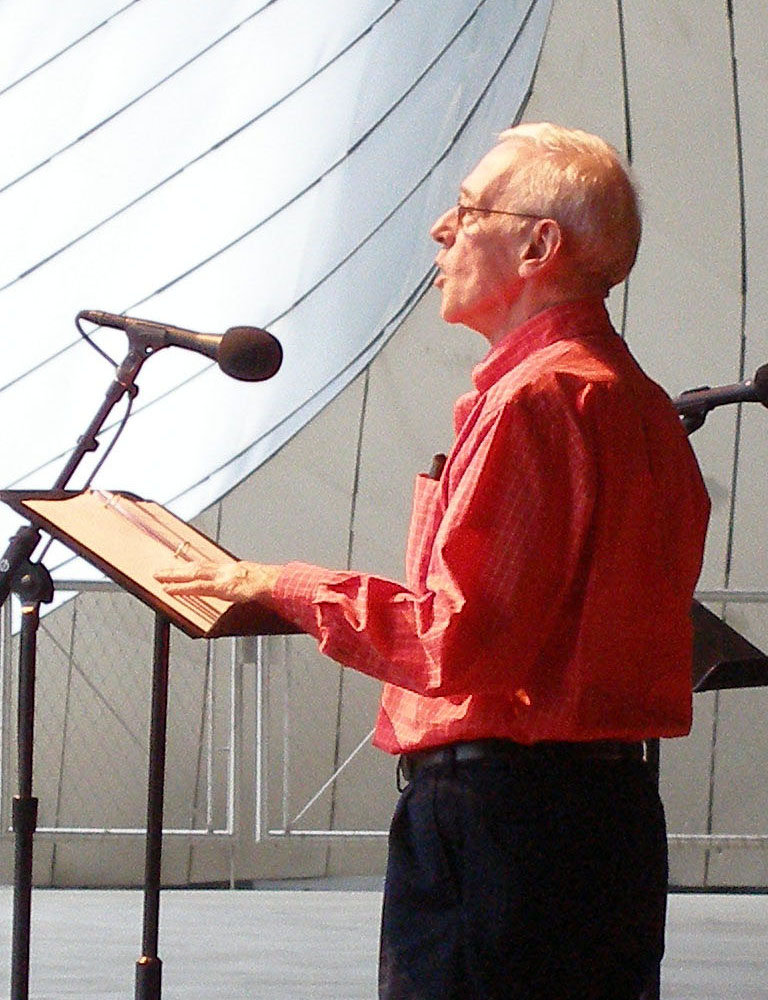
Mahoney in 2007

Mahoney's first voice job was in W. B. Yeats's "The Words upon the Window-Pane" for the award-winning National Radio Theater of Chicago. He provided the voices for Grebs in Antz (1998), Preston Whitmore in Atlantis: The Lost Empire and Atlantis: Milo's Return, General Rogard in The Iron Giant (1999), and Papi in Kronk's New Groove (but was succeeded by Jeff Bennett in The Emperor's New School for an unknown reason). In 2007, Mahoney provided the voice of Dr. Robert Terwilliger, Sr. (Sideshow Bob's father) in The Simpsons episode "Funeral for a Fiend". This reunited him with his Frasier co-stars Kelsey Grammer (Sideshow Bob) and David Hyde Pierce (Cecil, Sideshow Bob's brother).

=== 2005–2018: Post-Frasier ===
Mahoney co-starred as the Old Man in the Broadway revival of Prelude to a Kiss at the American Airlines Theater in a limited-run engagement running from previews on February 17, 2007, through to April 29, 2007. He appeared as an elderly drag queen in the ER season 13 episode "Somebody to Love," and co-starred with Steve Carell (himself a veteran of Chicago theater) as the father of Carell's character in Dan in Real Life. In March 2008, he opened in the world premiere of Better Late at the Northlight Theatre. He was also the narrator for Midwest Airlines commercials. Mahoney also made two appearances on USA Network's Burn Notice in the second (2009) and third (2010) season finales. His character, referred to only as "Management," is a senior intelligence agency official who is the apparent main mover of the conspiracy which blacklisted Michael Westen.

Mahoney joined the cast of In Treatment for the series' second season (2009) as a frenetic CEO who is overwhelmed by his personal and professional responsibilities and experiences chronic physical anxiety attacks. In 2010, he made a guest appearance on $#*! My Dad Says as homophobic retired naval officer Lt. Commander Wally Durham.

Beginning in April 2011, Mahoney began rehearsing The Outgoing Tide, a new play by Bruce Graham at Northlight Theatre in Skokie, Illinois (suburban Chicago). The play also stars fellow Chicago actors Rondi Reed and Thom Cox. In 2011, he had two guest appearances on Hot in Cleveland as Roy, a waiter and a love interest for Betty White's character Elka. This reunited him with his Frasier co-stars Jane Leeves and Wendie Malick. Mahoney was a featured ensemble cast member in The Birthday Party, playing in Chicago's Steppenwolf Theatre from January 24 to April 28, 2013. His last role was in Steppenwolf's play The Rembrandt, which ran from September to November 2017.

Despite the numerous successes throughout his career, Mahoney maintained that his early work in the play Orphans has "affected people more than any other play I've ever done. I still get mail from it, I still get people stopping me on the street, and it's 20 years later."

== Personal life ==
Mahoney lived in Oak Park, Illinois, and suffered from colon cancer in the mid-1980s. After being successfully treated for cancer again in 2014, he credited his love of acting and desire to continue it for giving him enough determination to survive both bouts, saying in October 2017: "I refused to yield to it because I love what I'm doing so much."

Mahoney rarely spoke publicly about his private life, and died without marrying or having any children. In 2002, he said, "I was never very mature in my relationships with women. First sign of conflict, I was gone. Wouldn't discuss it, because I was afraid it would lead to an argument." This stemmed from a fear of having an unhappy marriage like the one his parents had, though Mahoney had "several long-term relationships".

He was a Catholic who called Christianity "probably the most important facet of my life". Before each of his performances, Mahoney would pray "Most glorious blessed spirit, I thank you for all the gifts and talents that you've given me. Please help me to use all these gifts and talents to their fullest. And please accept this performance as a prayer of praise and thanks to you". He would also say prayers upon waking up and before going to sleep daily, and would repeatedly pray "Dear God, please help me to treat everybody – including myself – with love, respect, and dignity."

== Death ==
Mahoney died in a Chicago hospice on February 4, 2018, due to complications from throat cancer, originally diagnosed in 2014. He was 77 years old. According to his friend Anna D. Shapiro, "He was fragile and he was supposed to be having a routine procedure. But having just beat Stage 3 throat cancer, I think he was just too weak ... By the time he did The Rembrandt he was clean of cancer ... But other health issues came up and he was just too fragile."

== Filmography ==
=== Film ===
Year	Title	Role	Notes
1981	Hudson Taylor	Unknown	
1982	Mission Hill	Michael Doyle	
1985	Code of Silence	Prowler Representative	
1986	The Manhattan Project	Lieutenant Colonel Conroy	
1986	Streets of Gold	Linnehan	
1987	Tin Men	Moe Adams	
1987	Suspect	Judge Matthew Bishop Helms	
1987	Moonstruck	Perry	
1988	Frantic	Williams, U.S. Embassy Official	
1988	Betrayed	"Shorty"	
1988	Eight Men Out	William "Kid" Gleason	
1989	Say Anything...	James Court	
1990	Love Hurts	Boomer	
1990	The Russia House	Brady	
1991	Barton Fink	W.P. Mayhew	
1992	Article 99	Dr. Henry Dreyfoos	
1993	In the Line of Fire	Secret Service Director Sam Campagna	
1993	Striking Distance	Captain Vince Hardy	
1994	The Hudsucker Proxy	Chief	
1994	Reality Bites	Grant Gubler	
1995	An Affectionate Look at Fatherhood	Bob	
1995	The American President	Leo Solomon	
1996	Primal Fear	John Shaughnessy	
1996	She's the One	Mr. Fitzpatrick	
1996	Mariette in Ecstasy	Dr. Claude Baptiste	Unreleased
1998	Antz	Grebs, The Drunken Scout	Voice
1999	The Iron Giant	General Shannon Rogard	Voice
2000	The Broken Hearts Club	Jack	
2001	Almost Salinas	Max Harris	
2001	Atlantis: The Lost Empire	Preston B. Whitmore	Voice
2003	Atlantis: Milo's Return	Preston B. Whitmore	Voice
2005	Kronk's New Groove	Papi	Voice, direct-to-video
2007	Dan in Real Life	Poppy	
2010	Flipped	Chet Duncan	

=== Television ===
Year	Title	Role	Notes
1982	Chicago Story	Lieutenant Roselli	Main role
1984	The Killing Floor	Factory Representative	Television film
1985	Lady Blue	Captain Flynn	Television film
1986	Trapped in Silence	Dr. Winslow	Television film
1986	The Christmas Gift	Town Mayor	Television film
1987	Saturday Night Live	Eddie "Fast Eddie" Felson / Paul Newman	Episode: "Charlton Heston/Wynton Marsalis"
1987	The House of Blue Leaves	Artie Shaughnessy	Television film
1988	Favorite Son	Lou Brenner	Episode: "Part One"
1989	Dinner at Eight	Oliver Jordan	Television film
1990	The Image	Irving "Irv" Mickelson	Television film
1990	H.E.L.P.	Chief Patrick Meacham	Main role
1991	The 10 Million Dollar Getaway	Jimmy Burke	Television film
1992	The Human Factor	Dr. Alec McMurtry	Main role
1992	The Water Engine	Mason Gross	Television film
1992	Screenplay	Walter Partin	Episode: "Buying a Landslide"
1992	Cheers	Sy Flembeck	Episode: "Do Not Forsake Me, O' My Postman"
1992	Unnatural Pursuits	Paddy Quinn	Episode: "I Don't Do Cuddles"
1993–2004	Frasier	Martin Crane	Main role
1995	Biography	The Narrator	Voice, episode: "Al Capone: Scarface"
1996	3rd Rock from the Sun	Dr. Leonard Hanlin	Episode: "Body & Soul & Dick"
1997	Tracey Takes On...	Geoffrey Ayliss	Episode: "Childhood"
1998	Nothing Sacred	Vince Reyneaux	Episode: "The Coldest Night of the Year"
2000	Becker	Father Joe D'Andrea	Episode: "Crosstalk"
2000	Teacher's Pet	The Narrator / Tim Tim Tim	Voice, episode: "A Dog for All Seasons"
2000	Nature	The Narrator	Episode: "Intimate Enemies: Lions and Buffalo"
2003	Gary the Rat	Steele	Voice, episode: "Strange Bedfellows"
2005	Fathers and Sons	Gene	Television film
2006	ER	Bennett Cray	Episode: "Somebody to Love"
2007	Mobsters	The Narrator	Episode: "Al Capone"
2007	The Simpsons	Dr. Robert Terwilliger Sr.	Voice, episode: "Funeral for a Fiend"
2009	In Treatment	Walter Barnett	Recurring role (season 2), 7 episodes
2009–2010	Burn Notice	Management	2 episodes
2010	$#*! My Dad Says	Lieutenant Colonel Wally Durham	Episode: "The Manly Thing to Do"
2011–2014	Hot in Cleveland	Roy	Recurring role (seasons 2–3, 5), 6 episodes
2015	Foyle's War	Andrew Del Mar	Episode: "High Castle"

== Theatre ==
Year	Title	Role	Playwright	Venue
1986	The House of Blue Leaves	Artie Shaughnessy	John Guare	Vivian Beaumont Theatre, Broadway
2007	Prelude to a Kiss	Old Man	Craig Lucas	American Airlines Theatre, Broadway
2017	The Rembrandt	Simon	Jessica Dickey	Steppenwolf Theater Company, Chicago

== Awards and nominations ==
Organizations	Year	Category	Nominated work	Result	Ref.
Chicago Film Critics Association	1998	Commitment to Chicago Award	Himself	Honored	
Drama Desk Awards	1986	Outstanding Actor in a Play	The House of Blue Leaves	Nominated	
Drama League Award	2007	Distinguished Performance	Prelude to a Kiss	Nominated	
Golden Globe Award	1993	Best Supporting Actor – Television	Frasier (season one)	Nominated	
Golden Globe Award	2000	Best Supporting Actor – Television	Frasier (season eight)	Nominated	
Primetime Emmy Award	1999	Supporting Actor in a Comedy Series	Frasier (episode: "Our Parents, Ourselves")	Nominated	
Primetime Emmy Award	2003	Supporting Actor in a Comedy Series	Frasier (episode: "Fathers and Sons")	Nominated	
Prism Award	2007	Performance - Drama Series Multi-Episode Storyline	In Treatment	Nominated	
Screen Actors Guild Awards	1994	Outstanding Ensemble in a Comedy Series	Frasier (season one)	Nominated	
Screen Actors Guild Awards	1995	Outstanding Ensemble in a Comedy Series	Frasier (season two)	Nominated	
Screen Actors Guild Awards	1996	Outstanding Ensemble in a Comedy Series	Frasier (season three)	Nominated	
Screen Actors Guild Awards	1997	Outstanding Ensemble in a Comedy Series	Frasier (season four)	Nominated	
Screen Actors Guild Awards	1998	Outstanding Ensemble in a Comedy Series	Frasier (season five)	Nominated	
Screen Actors Guild Awards	1999	Outstanding Ensemble in a Comedy Series	Frasier (season six)	Won	
Screen Actors Guild Awards	2000	Outstanding Ensemble in a Comedy Series	Frasier (season seven)	Nominated	
Screen Actors Guild Awards	2001	Outstanding Ensemble in a Comedy Series	Frasier (season eight)	Nominated	
Screen Actors Guild Awards	2002	Outstanding Ensemble in a Comedy Series	Frasier (season nine)	Nominated	
Screen Actors Guild Awards	2003	Outstanding Ensemble in a Comedy Series	Frasier (season nine)	Nominated	
Theater World Awards	1986	Outstanding Performance Award	Orphans	Won	
Tony Award	1986	Featured Actor in a Play	The House of Blue Leaves	Won	
