= Death of a Salesman (2000 film) =

2000 American television drama film by Kirk Browning

- Based on: Death of a Salesman; 1949 play by Arthur Miller
- Written by: Arthur Miller
- Directed by: Kirk Browning
- Starring: Brian Dennehy; Elizabeth Franz; Ron Eldard
- Music by: Richard Woodbury
- Country of origin: United States
- Original language: English

Production
- Executive producers: Patricia Clifford; Brian Dennehy
- Producer: Marc Bauman
- Cinematography: Inge Morath; Joan Marcus; Eric Exit
- Running time: 175 minutes
- Production companies: Pace Theatrical Group; Salesman Broadway; The Goodman Theatre

Original release
- Network: Showtime
- Release: January 9, 2000

Death of a Salesman is a 2000 American made-for-television film adaptation of the 1949 play of the same name by Arthur Miller and directed by Kirk Browning. The film stars American actor Brian Dennehy (who won a Golden Globe Award at the 58th Golden Globe Awards for his performance) as Willy Loman (the Salesman). The film earned two nominations at both the 7th Screen Actors Guild Awards in 2001 and the 52nd Primetime Emmy Awards in 2000.

== Cast ==
- Brian Dennehy as Willy Loman
- Elizabeth Franz as Linda Loman
- Ron Eldard as Biff Loman
- Ted Koch as Happy Loman
- Howard Witt as Charley
- Richard Thompson as Bernard
- Allen Hamilton as Uncle Ben
- Stephanie March as Miss Forsythe

== Awards and nominations ==
Year	Award	Category	Nominee(s)	Result	Ref.
2000	Primetime Emmy Awards	Outstanding Lead Actor in a Miniseries or a Movie	Brian Dennehy	Nominated	
2000	Primetime Emmy Awards	Outstanding Supporting Actress in a Miniseries or a Movie	Elizabeth Franz	Nominated	
2001	Directors Guild of America Awards	Outstanding Directorial Achievement in Movies for Television or Miniseries	Kirk Browning	Nominated	
2001	Golden Globe Awards	Best Actor in a Miniseries or Motion Picture Made for Television	Brian Dennehy	Won	
2001	Producers Guild of America Awards	David L. Wolper Award for Outstanding Producer of Long-Form Television		Won	
2001	Screen Actors Guild Awards	Outstanding Performance by a Male Actor in a Miniseries or Television Movie	Brian Dennehy	Won	
2001	Screen Actors Guild Awards	Outstanding Performance by a Female Actor in a Miniseries or Television Movie	Elizabeth Franz	Nominated	
