= Christine Baranski =

American actress (born 1952)

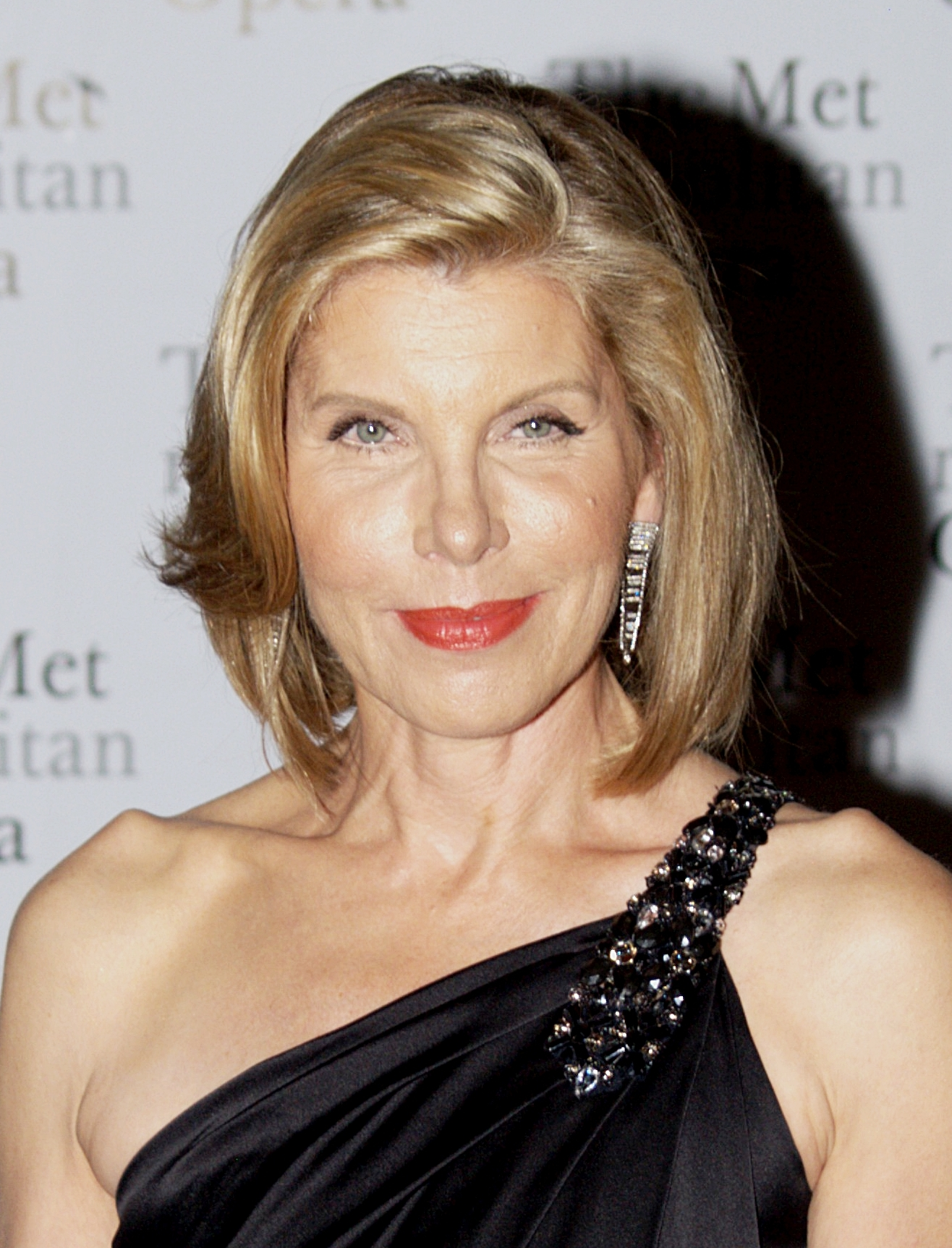
- Baranski in 2010
- Born: Christine Jane Baranski; May 2, 1952 (age 74); Buffalo, New York, U.S.
- Education: Juilliard School (BFA)
- Occupation: Actress
- Years active: 1972–present
- Political party: Democratic
- Spouse: Matthew Cowles (m. 1983; died 2014)
- Children: 2, including Lily Cowles
- Awards: Full list

Christine Jane Baranski (born May 2, 1952) is an American actress. She received the Primetime Emmy Award for Outstanding Supporting Actress in a Comedy Series for her role as Maryann Thorpe in the sitcom Cybill (1995–1998). Baranski is also known for her roles as Diane Lockhart in the legal drama series The Good Wife (2009–2016) and its spin-off series The Good Fight (2017–2022), and as Agnes van Rhijn in the period drama series The Gilded Age (2022–present); both roles earned her Primetime Emmy Award nominations.

Baranski is also known for her film roles in Reversal of Fortune (1990), The Birdcage (1996), Cruel Intentions (1999), How the Grinch Stole Christmas (2000), Chicago (2002), Mamma Mia! (2008), Into the Woods (2014), and Mamma Mia! Here We Go Again (2018). For her recurring role as Dr. Beverly Hofstadter in the sitcom The Big Bang Theory (2009–2019), she received four Primetime Emmy Award nominations.

Baranski won two Tony Awards for Best Featured Actress in a Play for her role as Charlotte in Tom Stoppard's The Real Thing (1984) and as Chris Gorman in Neil Simon's Rumors (1989). Her other major Broadway credits include Hurlyburly (1984), The House of Blue Leaves (1986), and Boeing Boeing (2008). She also portrayed Mrs. Lovett in the Kennedy Center's production of Sweeney Todd: The Demon Barber of Fleet Street (2002).

== Early life and education ==
Christine Jane Baranski was born on May 2, 1952, in Buffalo, New York, the daughter of Virginia (née Mazurowska) (1916–2002) and Lucien Baranski (1914–1960), who edited a Polish-language newspaper. She had an older brother, Michael J. Baranski (1949–1998), an advertising executive who died at age 48. She is of Polish descent, and her grandparents were stage actors in Poland before immigrating to the United States. Baranski was raised in a heavily Polish and Catholic neighborhood in the Buffalo suburb of Cheektowaga. She attended high school at the Villa Maria Academy where she was class president and salutatorian. She studied at New York City's Juilliard School (Drama Division Group 3: 1970–1974), graduating with a Bachelor of Fine Arts degree.

== Career ==
=== Stage ===
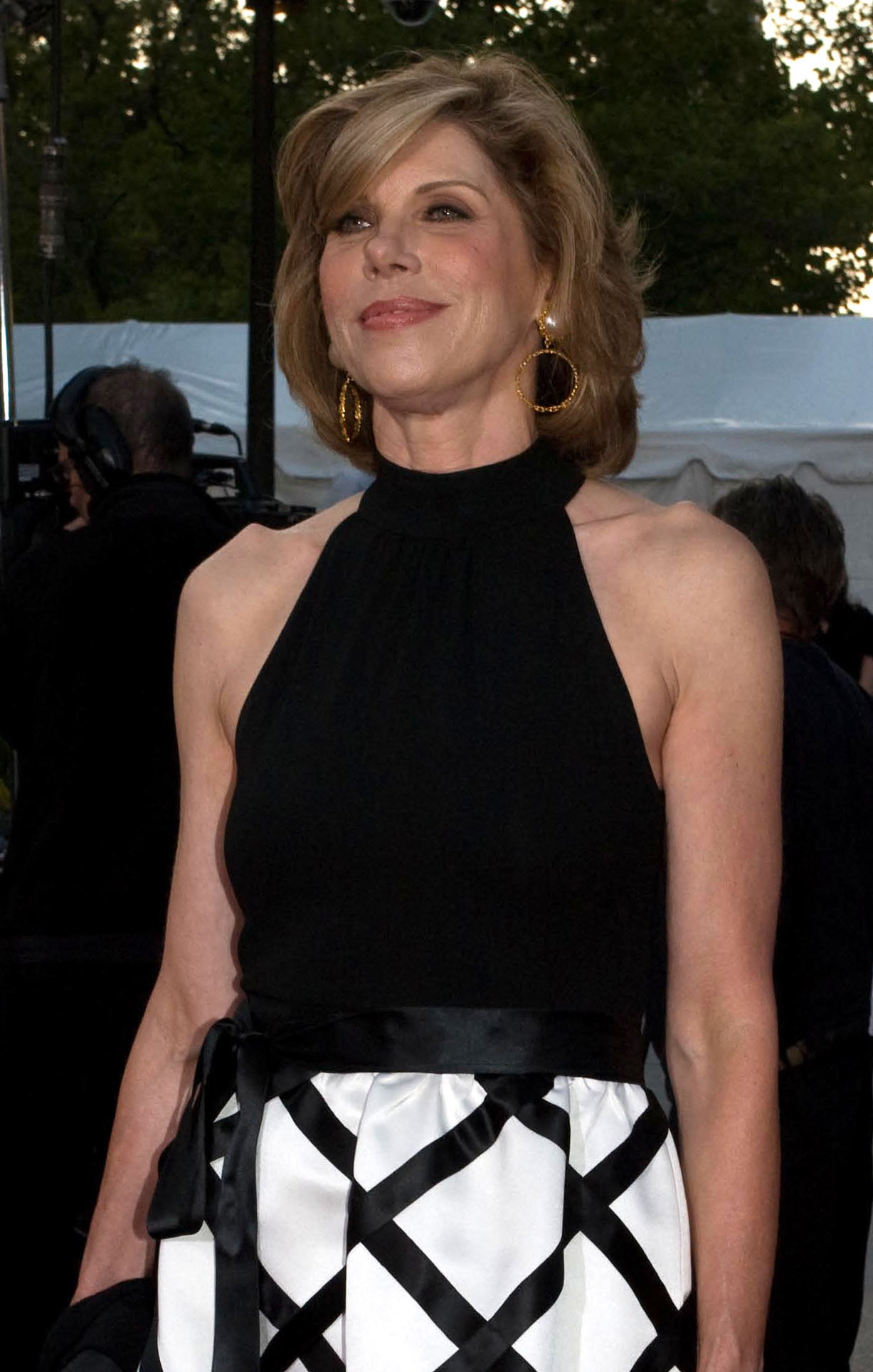
Baranski at the 2008 Metropolitan Opera opening night

Baranski made her off-Broadway debut in Coming Attractions at Playwrights Horizons in 1980, and has appeared in several off-Broadway productions at the Manhattan Theatre Club, starting with Sally and Marsha in 1982. She was in the original 1983 off-Broadway version of Sunday in the Park with George, but did not participate in the show's later Broadway run. Baranski made her Broadway debut in Hide & Seek in 1980. For her next Broadway performance, she played Charlotte in Tom Stoppard's The Real Thing, winning the Drama Desk Award for Outstanding Featured Actress in a Play and Tony Award for Best Featured Actress in a Play. She next replaced Judith Ivey as Bonnie in Hurlyburly, mistress Bunny Flingus in the original Broadway production of The House of Blue Leaves, Chris Gorman in Rumors (for which she won her second Tony), Regrets Only, Nick & Nora, and the Encores! concert staging of Follies. In 1992, she starred as Chloe in the original production of Terrence McNally's Lips Together, Teeth Apart, about two straight couples who spend a weekend in a gay community over the Fourth of July weekend. She won her second Drama Desk Award.

At the Kennedy Center in Washington, D.C., Baranski starred as Mrs. Lovett in Sweeney Todd in 2002 (for which she won the 2003 Helen Hayes Award for Outstanding Actress in a Musical) and as the title character in Mame in 2006. In her first Broadway production since 1991, Baranski was featured as the maid Berthe in the 2008 revival of Boeing Boeing. The show garnered two Tony Awards (Best Revival of a Play and Best Actor in a Play for Mark Rylance). The original cast included Bradley Whitford (Bernard), Kathryn Hahn (Gloria), Christine Baranski (Berthe), Gina Gershon (Gabriella), and Mary McCormack (Gretchen). The show closed on January 4, 2009, after 17 previews and 279 performances.

Baranski also appeared in a one-night-only concert benefit performance of Stephen Sondheim's A Little Night Music for Roundabout Theatre Company as Countess Charlotte Malcolm on January 12, 2009. The cast included Vanessa Redgrave, Natasha Richardson, Victor Garber and Marc Kudisch. In 2018, she was inducted into the American Theater Hall of Fame.

Baranski is due to make her first West End appearance in a production of Hay Fever in September 2026, which she described as a "dream come true".

=== Film ===
Baranski has appeared in various film roles. Some of her better-known roles are as Katherine Archer in The Birdcage (1996), Martha May Whovier in How the Grinch Stole Christmas (2000), Mary Sunshine in Chicago (2002) and Connie Chasseur in The Ref (1994). Baranski received further recognition for her role as Tanya Chesham-Leigh in the hit musical film Mamma Mia! (2008), and its sequel Mamma Mia! Here We Go Again (2018). Baranski played Cinderella's stepmother in the 2014 film adaptation of the musical Into the Woods. Baranski has also appeared in the films 9½ Weeks (1986), Legal Eagles (1986), Reversal of Fortune (1990), Addams Family Values (1993), Jeffrey (1995), The Odd Couple II (1998) Bulworth (1998), Cruel Intentions (1999), Bowfinger (1999), Welcome to Mooseport (2004), Trolls (2016) and A Bad Moms Christmas (2017).

=== Television ===
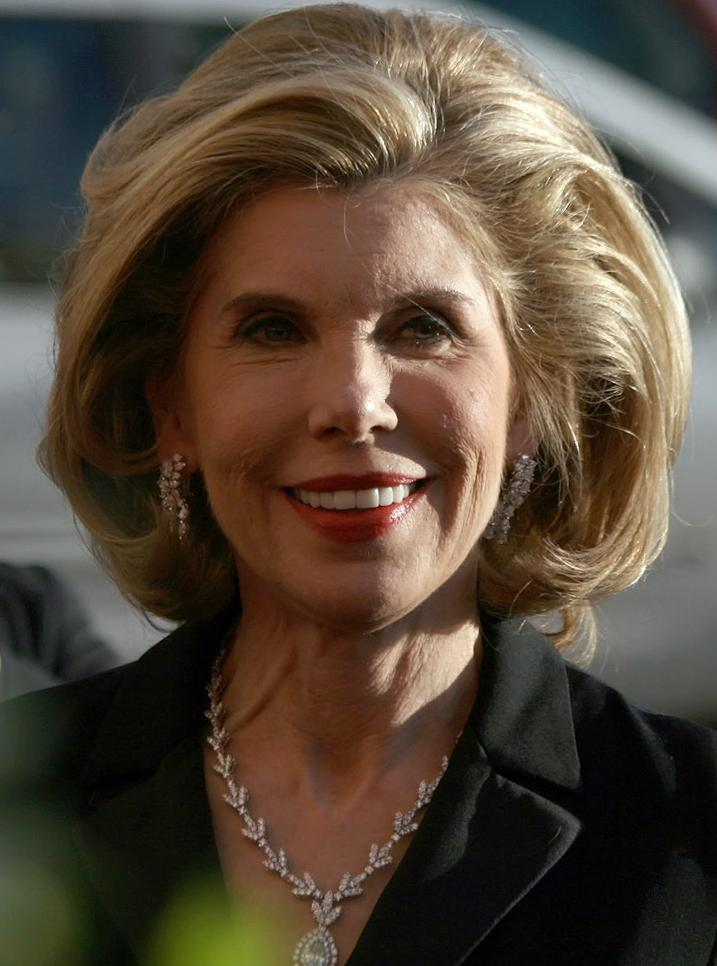
Baranski at the 2012 Romy Awards

Baranski appeared in short-term roles on various daytime soap operas, including All My Children and Another World. Baranski was featured as Cybill Shepherd's sarcastic, hard-drinking friend Maryann Thorpe in the CBS sitcom Cybill, which ran from 1995 until 1998, during which time she hosted Saturday Night Live and won the Emmy Award for Outstanding Supporting Actress in a Comedy Series along with three other nominations (1996, 1997, 1998). During this, Baranski portrayed a librarian named Sonja Umdahl in the "Dick and the Single Girl" episode of 3rd Rock from the Sun. A few years later, Baranski received an Emmy nomination for a guest starring role in the hit NBC series Frasier as controversial tough love radio psychiatrist Dr. Nora Fairchild. The episode, which was named for the character, parodied Dr. Laura Schlessinger. The episode was pulled from syndication by Paramount. Baranski had an uncredited role in the series Now and Again as the voice of Roger's overbearing wife Ruth, who was never seen by viewers.

Baranski later appeared in the 2000–2001 sitcom Welcome to New York and, with John Laroquette, in the 2003–2004 NBC sitcom Happy Family. She co-starred with Bernadette Peters in a pilot for an ABC sitcom, Adopted, in 2005, which was not picked up. She also played Faith Clancy, the mother of Jim Clancy in Ghost Whisperer. In 2009, Baranski began guest-starring in The Big Bang Theory as Dr. Beverly Hofstadter, a dispassionate psychiatrist and neuroscientist and mother of one of the protagonists, Leonard Hofstadter. She first appeared in the second-season episode "The Maternal Capacitance", for which she received an Emmy nomination. Due to the popularity of her first appearance, Baranski returned in the third season for the Christmas episode "The Maternal Congruence", receiving another Emmy nomination. She appeared in a total of 16 episodes during the show's run, earning four Emmy nominations for her recurring role.

From 2009 to 2016, Baranski played the role of Diane Lockhart, a top litigator and senior partner of a Chicago law firm on the CBS series The Good Wife. She was nominated for the Primetime Emmy Award for Outstanding Supporting Actress in a Drama Series for six seasons of the series, in the years 2010 to 2015. Besides her work on The Good Wife and the aforementioned guest appearances on The Big Bang Theory, her other appearances in that period include Ugly Betty in 2009 as Victoria Hartley, the haughty mother of Betty's new boyfriend.

From 2017 to 2022, Baranski reprised her role on The Good Wife in a spin-off titled The Good Fight. The show features Diane Lockhart joining another law firm after being forced to return to work. In the 79th Golden Globe Awards, she was nominated for the Golden Globe Award for Best Actress – Television Series Drama for her work in the fifth season of the show. Since 2022 she has portrayed Agnes van Rhijn in the Julian Fellowes-created HBO period drama The Gilded Age starring opposite Carrie Coon, Louisa Jacobson, and Cynthia Nixon. The cast received a nomination for the Screen Actors Guild Award for Outstanding Performance by an Ensemble in a Drama Series.

== Acting style and screen persona ==
Although recognized for her versatility across genres and performing media, Baranski is particularly known for playing sophisticated and highly educated upper-class women. Consequently, the media began alluding to the resemblance between this repeated on-screen persona and Baranski's real personality. Caroline Hallemann of Town & Country notes that, "For years, the award-winning actress has been the definition of on-screen sophistication." In 2017, the actress told Zac Posen for Interview Magazine, "What I'm getting at is if your career is not predicated on just your physical beauty, you're able to project a sophistication. You can take sophisticated to your grave. You can be that worldly woman, that woman who looks beautiful dressed up." On the other hand, Baranski humorously addressed these claims during her appearance on The Late Show with Stephen Colbert, "Everybody thinks this is, you know, this sophisticated lady, this New York type, these characters that I play, they think that's me. They should be in a room alone with me when I watch the Buffalo Bills. It is loud."

== Personal life ==
Baranski was married to actor Matthew Cowles from October 1983 until his death on May 22, 2014. They had two daughters, Isabel (born 1984), a lawyer, and Lily (born 1987), an actress. She lives in Bethlehem, Connecticut with her daughters. She is a practicing Catholic, at times accompanying her friend Robert King, the co-creator of The Good Fight, on the walk home during filming in 2021 following Sunday Mass. Like her character Diane Lockhart, Baranski is a member of the Democratic Party and is a liberal feminist. In 2024, she endorsed and campaigned for Kamala Harris.

== Filmography ==
=== Film ===
Year	Title	Role	Ref.
1982	Soup for One	Blonde in Bar	
1983	Lovesick	Nymphomaniac	
1984	Crackers	Maxine	
1986	9½ Weeks	Thea	
1986	Legal Eagles	Carol Freeman	
1987	The Pick-up Artist	Harriet	
1990	Reversal of Fortune	Andrea Reynolds	
1993	The Night We Never Met	Lucy	
1993	Life with Mikey	Carol	
1993	Addams Family Values	Becky Martin-Granger	
1994	The Ref	Connie Chasseur	
1994	Getting In	Mrs. Margaret "Maggie" Higgs	
1994	The War	Miss Strapford	
1995	New Jersey Drive	Prosecutor	
1995	Jeffrey	Ann Marwood Bartle	
1996	The Birdcage	Katherine Archer	
1998	The Odd Couple II	Thelma	
1998	Bulworth	Constance Bulworth	
1999	Cruel Intentions	Bunny Caldwell	
1999	Bowfinger	Carol	
1999	Get Bruce!	Herself	
2000	How the Grinch Stole Christmas	Martha May Whovier	
2002	The Guru	Shantal	
2002	Chicago	Mary Sunshine	
2003	Marci X	Mary Ellen Spinkle	
2004	Welcome to Mooseport	Charlotte Cole	
2005	Scooby-Doo! in Where's My Mummy?	Amelia Von Butch (voice)	
2006	Falling for Grace	Bree Barrington	
2006	Relative Strangers	Arleen Clayton	
2006	Bonneville	Francine	
2008	Mamma Mia!	Tanya Chesham-Leigh	
2010	The Bounty Hunter	Kitty Hurley	
2012	Foodfight!	Hedda Shopper (voice)	
2014	Into the Woods	Cinderella's Stepmother	
2014	Yellowbird	Janet (voice)	
2016	Trolls	Chef Bergen (voice)	
2016	Miss Sloane	Evelyn Sumner	
2017	A Bad Moms Christmas	Ruth	
2018	Mamma Mia! Here We Go Again	Tanya Chesham-Leigh	
2020	Christmas on the Square	Regina Fuller	
2026	All That She Wants		Post-production

=== Television ===
Year	Title	Role	Notes
1977	Busting Loose	Debbie	Episode: "The Decision: Part 1"
1980	Playing for Time	Olga	TV movie
1981	Texas	Sadie	2 episodes
1982	A Midsummer Night's Dream	Helena	TV movie
1983	Another World	Beverly Tucker	Unknown episodes
1984	All My Children	Jewel Maniscalo	Unknown episodes
1985	Big Shots in America	Cara	TV movie
1985	The Equalizer	Victoria Baines	Episode: "Mama's Boy"
1987	The House of Blue Leaves	Bunny Flingus	TV movie
1988	The Thorns	Polly	Episode: "The Maid"
1991	Law & Order	Katherine Masucci Beigel	Episodes: "The Torrents of Greed Parts 1 & 2"
1992	Screenplay	Blair Bennett	Episode: "Buying a Landslide"
1993	To Dance with the White Dog	Kate	TV movie
1994	Law & Order	Rose Siegal	Episode: "Nurture"
1995–1998	Cybill	Maryann Thorpe	Main role
1996	Saturday Night Live	Herself (host)	Episode: "Christine Baranski/The Cure"
1997	3rd Rock from the Sun	Sonja Umdahl	Episode: "Dick and the Single Girl"
1999	Now and Again	Ruth Bender (voice)	Episode: "Origins"; uncredited
1999	Frasier	Dr. Nora Fairchild	Episode: "Dr. Nora"
2000	Timothy Tweedle the First Christmas Elf	Flo (voice)	TV movie
2000–2001	Welcome to New York	Marsha Bickner	Main role
2001	Citizen Baines	Glenn Ferguson Baines Welch	Episode: "Three Days in November"
2002	Presidio Med	Dr. Terry Howland	Episodes: "Pick Your Battles", "Best of Enemies"
2003	Eloise at the Plaza	Prunella Stickler	TV movie
2003	Eloise at Christmastime	Prunella Stickler	TV movie
2003–2004	Happy Family	Annie Brennan	Main role
2004	Spellbound		TV movie
2004	In the Game		TV pilot
2005	Recipe for a Perfect Christmas	Lee Bellmont	TV movie
2005	Adopted	Judy Rabinowitz	TV movie
2005	Ghost Whisperer	Faith Clancy	2 episodes
2006	Inseparable	Barbara	TV movie
2006	American Dad!	Homeless Woman (voice)	Episode: "Failure Is Not a Factory-installed Option"
2009	Ugly Betty	Victoria Hartley	3 episodes
2009	Psych	Alice Clayton	Episode: "He Dead"
2009–2011, 2013–2019	The Big Bang Theory	Dr. Beverly Hofstadter	Recurring role
2009–2016	The Good Wife	Diane Lockhart	Main role
2011	Who Is Simon Miller?	Amanda	TV movie
2011	Ugly Americans	Grimes' Mummy (voice)	Episode: "Mummy Dearest"
2013	Family Guy	Herself (voice)	Episode: "Call Girl"
2015	Sinatra: All or Nothing at All	Ruth Berle (voice)	Limited series
2015–2019	BoJack Horseman	Amanda Hannity (voice)	2 episodes
2017	Regular Show	Guardian (voice)	Episode: "A Regular Epic Final Battle"
2017–2022	The Good Fight	Diane Lockhart	Main role; Also producer
2017	Michael Jackson's Halloween	Mrs. Grau (voice)	TV special
2017	Spirit Riding Free	Miz McDonnell (voice)	Episode: "Lucky and the Long Way Home"
2018–2022	Fancy Nancy	Mrs. Devine (voice)	19 episodes
2018	Family Guy	Newport Heiress	Episode: "Con Heiress"
2019	Young Sheldon	Beverly Hofstadter (voice)	Episode: "A Swedish Science Thing and the Equation for Toast"
2019	Archibald's Next Big Thing	Madame Baroness (voice)	Episode: "The Secret of Madame Baroness"
2019	The Bravest Knight	The Dragon (voice)	2 episodes
2019	Spirit Riding Free: Pony Tales	Miz McDonnell (voice)	Episode: "The Mystery of the Golden Unicorn"
2020	Magical Girl Friendship Squad	Verus (voice)	3 episodes
2021	Fairfax	Joyce (voice)	Episode: "Fairfolks"
2021	The Simpsons	Herself (voice)	Episode: "Portrait of a Lackey on Fire"
2022–present	The Gilded Age	Agnes van Rhijn	Main role
2022	The Loud House	Joyce Crandall (voice)	Episode: "Save Royal Woods!"
2023	Praise Petey	White St. Barts (voice)	Main role
2025	Nine Perfect Strangers	Victoria	8 episodes (season 2)
2026	Stuart Fails to Save the Universe	Herself	Episode: "Spoiler: Zack's in This One"

=== Theatre ===
Year	Title	Role	Notes
1972	Hamlet	Lady	Delacorte Theater
1974	'Tis Pity She's a Whore	Annabella	McCarter Theatre
1974	Romeo and Juliet	Lady Capulet	American Shakespeare Festival
1974	Cat on a Hot Tin Roof	Margaret	American Shakespeare Festival, double-cast
1974	Twelfth Night	Lady-in-Waiting	American Shakespeare Festival
1975	The Cherry Orchard	Danyasha	Center Stage Theatre
1975	Tartuffe	Dorina	Center Stage Theatre
1976	Misalliance	Lina Szczepanowska	Center Stage Theatre
1976	She Stoops To Conquer	Constance	Center Stage Theatre
1977	Private Lives	Amanda or Sibyl (?)	Cohoes Music Hall
1977	Angel City	Miss Scoons	McCarter Theatre
1977	Otherwise Engaged	Davina Saunders	U.S. cities tour
1978	Born Yesterday	Billie Dawn	Center Stage Theatre
1978	One Crack Out	Wanda	Marymount Manhattan Theatre
1978	Much Ado About Nothing	Beatrice	Annenberg Center, American Shakespeare Festival
1979	Says I, Says He	Maeve Macpherson	Marymount Manhattan Theatre
1979	The Shadow of a Gunman	Minnie Powell	Symphony Space
1980	Company	April	Playwrights Horizons
1980	Lady of The Diamond	Connie Weaver	Studio Arena
1980	The Trouble with Europe	Amanda Gracie, Madame Igrec, and second underworld figure	Marymount Manhattan Theatre
1980	Hide & Seek	Elly Bart	Broadway
1980	Coming Attractions	Miss America	Playwrights Horizons
1981	Talley's Folly	Sally Talley	Studio Arena
1981	Operation Midnight Climax	Angela	Off-Center Theatre
1982	A Midsummer Night's Dream	Helena	American Shakespeare Festival, Delacorte Theatre
1982	Sally and Marsha	Marsha	Manhattan Theatre Club
1982	Blithe Spirit	Elvira	McCarter Theatre
1982	The Undefeated Rumba Champ	Miss Harris	Ensemble Studio Theater
1983	Sunday in the Park with George	Clarisse (later named Yvonne), Blair Daniels	Playwrights Horizons
1984	The Real Thing	Charlotte	Plymouth Theatre
1985	Hurlyburly	Bonnie	Ethel Barrymore Theatre
1986	The House of Blue Leaves	Bunny Flingus	Vivian Beaumont Theatre, Plymouth Theatre
1986	It's Only a Play	Julia Budder	Manhattan Theatre Club
1988	Hedda Gabler	Hedda Gabler	Studio Arena
1988	Rumors	Chris Gorman	Broadhurst Theatre
1989	Assassins	Performer (reading)	Playwrights Horizons
1990	Elliot Loves	Joanna	Goodman Theatre
1991	Lips Together, Teeth Apart	Chloe Haddock	New York City Center Stage I, Lucille Lortel Theatre
1991	Nick & Nora	Tracy Gardner	Marriott Marquis Theatre
1993	The Loman Family Picnic	Doris	Manhattan Theatre Club Stage I
1994	The Petrified Prince	Queen Katarina (?) (reading)	Joseph Papp Public Theater
1997	Promises, Promises	Marge MacDougall	Encores!, City Center Theatre
1998	Mizlansky/Zilinsky or "Schmucks"	Sylvia Zilinsky (voice)	Manhattan Theatre Club Stage I
1999	Sweeney Todd	Mrs. Lovett	Ahmanson Theatre
2002	Sweeney Todd	Mrs. Lovett	Kennedy Center
2002	Sondheim Concert Spectacular	Herself	David Geffen Hall
2002	The Threepenny Opera	Mrs. Peachum (reading)	Roundabout Theatre Company
2004	Dinner	Paige (reading)	Royal National Theatre/Loft
2006	Mame	Mame Dennis	Kennedy Center
2007	Follies	Carlotta Campion	Encores!, New York City Center
2007	The Sisters Rosensweig	Gorgeous Teitelbaum (reading)	Vivian Beaumont Theater
2007	Regrets Only	Tibby McCullough	New York City Center Stage I
2008	Boeing-Boeing	Berthe	Longacre Theatre
2009	A Little Night Music	Countess Charlotte Malcolm	Roundabout Theatre Company
2009	Love, Loss, and What I Wore	Performer (reading)	DR2 Theatre
2013	On Your Toes	Peggy Porterfield	Encores!, New York City Center
2015	Follies	Phyllis Rogers Stone	Royal Albert Hall
2016	White Rabbit Red Rabbit	Performer (replacement)	Westside Theatre
2026	Hay Fever	Judith Bliss	Wyndham's Theatre

=== Video games ===
Year	Project	Role
2013	Skylanders: Swap Force	Kaos' Mother
2017	Steven Universe: Save the Light	Hessonite
2019	Steven Universe: Unleash the Light	Hessonite

=== Audio ===
Year	Title	Role	Notes
1992	A Christmas Memory	Female cousin (Sook in later adaptations)	Short autobiographical story
1994	Unsung Musicals	Performer	Song: Sherry! from: Sherry!
2002	Short Talks on the Universe	Maria	Story: "3 A.M."
2019–20	The Two Princes	Queen Lavinia	Audio drama, 3 seasons

== Awards and nominations ==
Baranski has received numerous accolades over her career including a Primetime Emmy Award, three Screen Actors Guild Awards, and two Tony Awards. Baranski is also the most nominated performer at the Critics' Choice Television Awards, with 10 nominations.
