= Frasier season 9 =

Frasier
- Season 9
- DVD cover
- Showrunner: Dan O'Shannon
- Starring: Kelsey Grammer; Jane Leeves; David Hyde Pierce; Peri Gilpin; John Mahoney
- No. of episodes: 24

Release
- Original network: NBC
- Original release: September 25, 2001 – May 21, 2002

Season chronology
- ← Previous; Season 8 Next → Season 10

The ninth season of the American television sitcom Frasier aired on NBC from September 25, 2001 to May 21, 2002.

== Cast ==
=== Main ===
- Kelsey Grammer as Frasier Crane
- Jane Leeves as Daphne Moon
- David Hyde Pierce as Niles Crane
- Peri Gilpin as Roz Doyle
- John Mahoney as Martin Crane

=== Special appearance by ===
- Tushka Bergen as Miranda
- Lisa Darr as Laura
- Lindsay Frost as Samantha
- Cynthia Lamontagne as Annie
- Gigi Rice as Regan
- Claire Stansfield as Kristina
- Shannon Tweed as Dr. Honey Snow
- Lisa Waltz as Tricia
- Claire Yarlett as Vicky
- Mary Hart as herself
- Bill Gates as himself

=== Special guest ===
- Anthony LaPaglia as Simon
- Bebe Neuwirth as Lilith
- Jean Smart as Lana
- Patricia Clarkson as Claire
- Shelley Long as Diane Chambers
- Rita Wilson as Hester Crane
- Brian Kerwin as Bob
- Tom Irwin as Frank
- Tony Goldwyn as Roger
- Adam Arkin as Tom
- Dan Butler as Bulldog
- Harriet Sansom Harris as Bebe
- Kristin Chenoweth as Portia
- M. Emmet Walsh as Rich
- Brian Stokes Mitchell as Cam Winston
- Lindsay Crouse as Peg
- Wolfgang Puck as himself
- Michael Keaton as Blaine Sternin
- Allison Janney as Susanna (Note: Janney also played caller Phyllis in the eighth episode.)
- Bridgette Wilson-Sampras as Kris
- Rhea Perlman as Carla Tortelli
- John Ratzenberger as Cliff Clavin
- George Wendt as Norm Peterson
- Brian Cox as Harry Moon

=== Recurring ===
- Patrick Kerr as Noel
- Tom McGowan as Kenny
- Brian Klugman as Kirby
- Millicent Martin as Mrs. Moon (Note: Also credited as a special guest in two episodes.)

=== Guest ===
- Dina Waters as Nanette
- Robert Picardo as Charlie
- Conrad Janis as Albert
- Dan Bucatinsky as Jewelry Clerk
- Bellamy Young as Lisa
- Trevor Einhorn as Frederick
- Jeff Perry as John Clayton
- Paul Willson as Paul
- Raye Birk as Twitchell
- Joe Flaherty as Herm
- Bill Hayes as Sully
- Suzanne Cryer as Denise
- Ted King as Craig
- Jay Karnes as Corporate Guy

== Episodes ==
No. overall	No. in season	Title	Directed by	Written by	Original release date	Prod. code	U.S. viewers (millions)
193	1	"Don Juan in Hell"	Kelsey Grammer	Sam Johnson & Chris Marcil	September 25, 2001	901	19.55
194	2	"Don Juan in Hell"	Kelsey Grammer	Lori Kirkland	September 25, 2001	902	19.55
Frasier and his family are still with Claire (Patricia Clarkson) in Belize. Niles and Martin think Claire is wonderful (although Daphne resents this), but Frasier is troubled by a dream he had about Lana (Jean Smart), and wonders if he is with the right woman. On returning to Seattle, he meets a man (Brian Kerwin) who is torn between two women, and asks Frasier's advice as a psychiatrist. Frasier says he must consider whom he would spend the rest of his life with, prompting him to seek reconciliation with his ex-wife. This sets Frasier thinking, and on returning home, he breaks up with Claire. He then attends Kirby's (Brian Klugman) graduation party with Roz, hoping to discuss his feelings with Lana, but discovers that the man from the luggage office is Kirby's father, Bob. After advising Lana to talk to Bob about his feelings for her, Frasier is tormented by thoughts of his previous failed relationships. This episode was dedicated to show writer/creator David Angell and his wife Lynn, who died aboard American Airlines Flight 11 on September 11, 2001.
195	3	"The First Temptation of Daphne"	Kelsey Grammer	Gayle Abrams	October 2, 2001	904	16.47
While looking for a recipe in Niles' briefcase for him, Daphne mistakenly opens a file containing case notes for one of his patients. She discovers that this woman, Heather (Michelle Stafford), is in love with Niles. He explains that transference is common among psychiatric patients, but also insists that he cannot discuss any specific case. Daphne, however, is tormented by curiosity, and seeks to meet with the woman. Martin returns from a fruitless hunting trip, and Frasier is horrified to discover that he has unknowingly brought a cricket with him into the apartment.
196	4	"The Return of Martin Crane"	David Lee	Dan O'Shannon & Bob Daily	October 9, 2001	905	15.10
Martin is about to start a new job as a security guard, and the occasion dredges up memories of day he was shot. These memories appear in flashback: while out on patrol with his partner Frank (Tom Irwin), Martin pulled into the parking lot of a store that was being robbed. Martin walked in at the wrong time and got shot. Frasier has ordered a special congratulatory cake, which Roz delivers. Meanwhile, Niles has bought Daphne tickets to a Billy Joel concert for that evening, and she has bought him tickets to a festival of Mongolian throat-singing, also for that evening. This means they have to decide which to attend. Guest Caller: Anthony Edwards as Tom
197	5	"Love Stinks"	Katy Garretson	Saladin K. Patterson	October 16, 2001	906	15.48
Frasier feels dejected one morning when he discovers a graffiti poem about him on the restroom wall at work, calling him a snob. He decides to host a party for the entire station in an attempt to get to know everyone better. He asks Roz to invite her new boyfriend, Roger (Tony Goldwyn), but she says that she thinks Roger would be uncomfortable with the people at the party. When Frasier asks whether this has anything to do with Roger’s occupation (waste collector), Roz tersely denies having any problem. She later changes her mind, but closely watches Roger at the party and cuts in quickly every time his profession is mentioned in conversation. When Roger overhears Roz saying to Kenny that not everyone has a job they are proud of, he promptly leaves. After the party, Frasier has made friends with everyone, but he rues this new popularity among people with whom he has nothing in common, and wants things to be back the way they were. Meanwhile Roz feels upset after the break-up with Roger and admits to still being in love with him, although she cannot get past the issue of his job.
198	6	"Room Full of Heroes"	Wil Shriner	Eric Zicklin	October 30, 2001	903	15.41
Frasier is holding a Halloween fancy-dress party, which he is attending dressed as Sigmund Freud; the theme is that the guests arrive dressed as their personal heroes. Martin is dressed as Joe DiMaggio, Daphne as Elton John, and Roz arrives dressed as Wonder Woman, claiming she thought it was a superhero theme party. Niles arrives last, dressed as Martin, who is thrilled and touched by the gesture. But Frasier is aghast and feels that Niles is blatantly attempting to show him up and curry favour with Martin. Frasier has devised a party game: in character as their hero, each player draws a slip of paper with a question or situation, and must act out their hero's response in character. Its appeal wanes fast, and the party degenerates into drinking. Frasier, seeing his thoroughly-planned game fall apart, angrily storms out. He then has to confront the children of the building, who call him "Old Man Crane" and believe that he eats people's brains.
199	7	"Bla-Z-Boy"	Robert H. Egan	Jon Sherman	November 6, 2001	907	14.47
Over breakfast one morning, Martin remarks that it is the eighth anniversary of the day he moved in. The revelation makes Frasier irritable. His temper worsens when Martin accidentally spills oil over the carpet when trying to remedy a squeak in his recliner; Frasier irrationally views the accident as a deliberate act of hostility on Martin's part. Niles decides to use his experience as a couples therapist to mediate. Daphne has expressed an interest in playing the piano, so Niles offers to give her lessons. He also agrees to teach Roz, who picks up the technique much more quickly than Daphne. Niles is willing to persevere with Daphne, until he hears that she has been taught before, and her last teacher committed suicide.
200	8	"The Two Hundredth Episode"	David Lee	Rob Hanning	November 13, 2001	908	19.27
Frasier is celebrating two thousand editions of his show at KACL, with a guest appearance from Bill Gates, who ends up taking several calls about Microsoft products. Returning home afterward, Frasier opens a bedroom cupboard full of cassette tape recordings of his shows. When he finds that one of his recordings has been destroyed, he broadcasts an appeal to anyone who has a recording of the missing show. When station listener Tom (Adam Arkin) calls in to say he has a taped copy of the episode Frasier, he and Niles get a first-hand experience of fan obsession. Guest Callers: Larry Gelbart as Joel; Allison Janney as Phyllis; Jennifer Jason Leigh as Estelle; Bobby Short as Warren
SPE	SPE	"200th Special Outtakes"	Kelsey Grammer	Unknown	November 13, 2001	TBA	19.28
Bob Costas hosts the Frasier cast as they reminisce on outtakes from the show's past 200 episodes.
201	9	"Sharing Kirby"	Kelsey Grammer	Heide Perlman	November 20, 2001	909	16.38
Frasier and Roz are interviewing candidates for an internship at KACL. Kirby Gardner appears unexpectedly. Frasier prevents Kirby from getting the position but promises to find him an alternative. Soon afterwards, learning that Niles has acquired a case of Château Haut-Brion that he refuses to share, Frasier suggests his brother employ Kirby to help rearrange his library, as a form of revenge. Niles does so, and is horrified at the chaos that ensues. However, he then learns that Kirby knows the grand-daughter of the reclusive William Mulvehill, the owner of an impressive wine collection. He persuades Kirby to call on his behalf, and he discovers that Mulvehill will allow one visitor to the wine cellar. Frasier soon finds out about this, and the brothers subsequently compete at doing favors for Kirby, in the hope of being selected as that visitor.
202	10	"Junior Agent"	Scott Ellis	Bob Daily	November 27, 2001	910	16.42
Dr. Zach (Chris Berg), a doctor from whom Frasier differs entirely, has a radio show that has become very popular. Frasier's agent Bebe Glazer (Harriet Sansom Harris) has taken on Dr. Zach as a client, and passes Frasier on to her former assistant, Portia Sanders (Kristin Chenoweth). Frasier refuses and storms out angrily, deciding to end his association with Bebe's agency. However, he finds Portia very persistent, determined to prove her abilities to him. Guest Callers: Pat Boone as Garth; Cherry Jones as Janet
203	11	"Bully for Martin"	Stuart Ross	Eric Zicklin	December 11, 2001	911	14.04
Frasier discovers that Martin's supervisor at work, Rich (M. Emmet Walsh), is treating him badly, being unnecessarily bossy and disrespectful. He decides to speak to the owner of the security company (Robert Picardo), who also happens to be Rich's son. But when Rich receives a reprimand from his son, he assumes that Martin went over his head to complain. Niles and Frasier attempt to rectify the situation. Meanwhile, Roz is boring everyone by talking endlessly about how well her relationship with Roger is going. Guest Caller: Andy García as Terrance
204	12	"Mother Load"	Sheldon Epps	Lori Kirkland	January 8, 2002	912	14.31
205	13	"Mother Load"	Sheldon Epps	Lori Kirkland	January 15, 2002	913	13.78
Frasier is furious when he finds his parking space in Elliott Bay Towers encroached upon by the new SUV belonging to Cam Winston (Brian Stokes Mitchell), his neighbor and nemesis. He takes the case to the condo board, and is delighted when his impassioned oration persuades them to rule that Cam must park in the sub-basement. However, Cam lives in the apartment above Frasier's, and he devises a suitable method of revenge, involving the American flag. Niles asks Daphne to move in with him, and she eagerly accepts, but when she receives a phone call from her mother announcing an impending visit, she asks that the move be postponed. When Gertrude Moon (Millicent Martin) arrives, Niles discovers why: she still believes Daphne to be a virgin. Rather than bring her husband, Gertrude turns up with Simon (Anthony LaPaglia), Daphne's brother. For the next few days, both Crane brothers have a terrible time to endure, as Gertrude stays with Niles and Simon with Frasier.
206	14	"Juvenilia"	Katy Garretson	Sam Johnson & Chris Marcil	January 22, 2002	914	14.76
Audience research into KACL listeners shows that Frasier's average listener is an older gentleman who keeps the radio on for company. Kenny suggests Frasier reach out to the youth, by appearing on Teen Scene; Frasier, who appeared once before on that show, refuses initially, but when approached for an autograph by a young woman working for a hospice, he reluctantly consents. The Teen Scene interview sees the panel asking Frasier numerous probing questions about his personal life. Kirby Gardner, who went to the same school as the panel members, provides Frasier with embarrassing information about the trio which allows him to regain the upper hand. Meanwhile, Niles decides to steal a street sign with Daphne's name on it as a romantic gesture. Daphne discovers that Martin kissed a woman named Peg (Lindsay Crouse) at a work party, and although he insists that it was nothing special, he spends a few days waiting by the telephone in case she calls. Guest Caller: Freddie Prinze Jr. as Mike
207	15	"The Proposal"	Wil Shriner	Rob Hanning	February 5, 2002	915	18.99
Niles is planning to propose to Daphne, and he wants everything to be perfect. Frasier helps him to choose a ring, Roz advises him on what to say, and Martin takes part in the wine-tasting. Meanwhile, while Frasier and Niles are arranging everything at Niles' apartment, and Wolfgang Puck is preparing dinner for them, Daphne arrives in a terrible state and announces that she has the flu. Suddenly, Frasier has to smuggle numerous participants out of the apartment unseen, but Niles soon realises that the event itself need not be postponed. Ultimately, Niles proposes to Daphne and she accepts, and they both spend time together despite her being ill.
208	16	"Wheels of Fortune"	Jerry Zaks	Ken Levine & David Isaacs	February 26, 2002	917	17.78
Lilith's half-brother, Blaine Sternin (played by Michael Keaton), has come to Seattle. Frasier remembers him as an expert con-man, who sold him futures in kelp and stole a valuable salt server from him years ago. He is now resolutely determined not to fall for any more scams. Blaine turns up at his door in a wheelchair, announcing that he had a car accident which left him paralysed from the waist down. He claims to have had a deep religious conversion and seen the error of his ways, and to be working as a preacher. He returns the salt server and asks Frasier for forgiveness. Niles, Martin and Daphne are all convinced, but Frasier is not. After he embarrasses himself trying to prove that Blaine is a fake, Frasier concedes and forgives him, only to find out later that his instincts were right and that Blaine was faking the whole time when he finds an empty wheelchair outside his apartment.
209	17	"Three Blind Dates"	Kelsey Grammer	Gayle Abrams	March 5, 2002	918	14.43
Niles, Daphne and Roz feel sorry for Frasier when he tells them that he will be attending an art exhibition alone one evening. They realise that he has not had a proper relationship since Claire, and conspire to see if they can find suitable women for him to date. Niles suggests a former patient of his, Lisa (Bellamy Young), who has several interests in common with Frasier. He tries to engineer circumstances in which they could meet by chance, taking Frasier along to the bookstore which she owns, but without success. Roz then brings an artistic friend of hers called Susanna (Allison Janney) to dinner at Frasier's apartment, but she and Frasier have a disagreement over the work of Benjamin Locklear. Finally, Martin puts Frasier in touch with a young woman called Kris (Bridgette Wilson), whom Frasier finds very attractive, but during their pre-dinner drinks at her favourite bar she starts playing pool with some friends and her attention disappears from Frasier almost completely. It is only when she sends him next door to get some change that his fortunes begin to improve.
210	18	"War of the Words"	Sheldon Epps	Saladin K. Patterson	March 12, 2002	916	14.85
Frederick is due to compete in the National Spelling Championship, and Frasier has been training him. Frederick does extremely well in the spelling bee, and is crowned National Champion. However, the parents of the runner-up notice an anomaly when watching the recording: it seems that Frasier was unconsciously mouthing the letters of the final word as Frederick spelled it out. The trophy is awarded to the runner-up, Warren Clayton, but Frederick and Frasier are still invited to the finalists' banquet, where they are subjected to taunts and accusations of cheating. Frederick will not tolerate his father being called a cheater, and challenges Warren to a rematch. Guest Caller: Naomi Judd as Lillian
211	19	"Deathtrap"	Kelsey Grammer	Jon Sherman	April 2, 2002	919	14.18
A flashback shows Frasier and Niles as schoolchildren, stealing a skull from the school science laboratory to use in a production of Hamlet. The Cranes' old family house is up for sale, and Frasier and Niles decide to pay it another visit, wondering if it would be worth purchasing and turning into a bed and breakfast. The owner, Mr. Lasskopf (Hal Landon Jr.), has no memory of them, but Martin remembers that he never returned their security deposit. The brothers soon realise that the house is too small to be a bed and breakfast, but then they remember that there is a memory chest hidden under a loose floorboard, so they return secretly after dark to find it. First, however, they find a human skull, and leap to the conclusion that they have stumbled upon an unsolved murder, involving Mrs. Lasskopf.
212	20	"The Love You Fake"	Katy Garretson	Sam Johnson & Chris Marcil	April 9, 2002	924	14.13
Frasier's feud with Cam Winston has reignited after Cam's washing machine causes a leak. Frasier bribes the building's handyman to cut off Cam's water supply. Cam then comes down to complain, and seeing Eddie unwell, suggests that his mother, a vet who happens to be staying with him, could help out. Everyone gets along well with Cam's mother, except Frasier, who sees it as consorting with the enemy. Martin and Cam's mother decide that Frasier and Cam need to reconcile, so they decide to pretend they are a couple.
213	21	"Cheerful Goodbyes"	Sheldon Epps	Heide Perlman	April 30, 2002	922	15.82
Frasier, Martin, Niles and Daphne are in Boston for a conference that Frasier and Niles will attend. They encounter Frasier's old friend Cliff Clavin (John Ratzenberger) at the airport bar, who thinks Frasier is in town for his retirement party before he moves to Florida, and end up going along to the party with him before dinner. Martin hits it off with fellow beer lover Norm Peterson (George Wendt). Daphne meets Cliff, and takes all of his erroneous trivial facts and stories at face value. Niles is the only person not having a good time; he has to prepare an introduction for Frasier's speech, and must continually postpone a dinner reservation at a fancy restaurant. Niles's mood changes, though, when Carla (Rhea Perlman) begins telling him of all the pranks and jokes that she and the others used to play on Frasier. Eventually, Cliff confides in Frasier, saying that he does not believe any of his supposed friends actually care that he plans to leave town. When Cliff leaves for a walk around the block, Frasier shares this news, and inspires everyone to deliver speeches in Cliff's honor. Cliff decides that he cannot leave such good friends, and opts to stay in Boston. Carla, who despises him and desperately wants him to leave, tries to shoot him with a speargun he received as a present while the others try their best to restrain her. Guest Caller: Rufus Wainwright as Jeremy
214	22	"Frasier Has Spokane"	Wil Shriner	Eric Zicklin	May 7, 2002	920	13.56
Frasier's show has been picked up by a station in Spokane, and he and Roz have been invited there by the station to do their first show from Spokane. Once off air, he also learns from Roz that she and Roger have broken up. Once in Spokane, Frasier appears at a press conference to introduce himself and Roz to the local media. During this conference the reporters are obnoxious and condescending as they say that he will probably never be able to live up to local icon Neil Sullivan (affectionately known as Sully by the locals). When Sully (Bill Hayes) arrives to make a final appearance and to wish Frasier luck the reporters give a dramatic final send-off. Things do not go too smoothly during Frasier's show either; every caller wants him to go back to Seattle, with some deciding to boycott the station until Sully comes back on the air. Frasier is determined to show the local audience his brand of therapy can help, and so convinces Roz to call in with a problem. Roz improvises and says she is afraid of the dark, but Frasier delves deeper into the problem and this soon develops into him resolving Roz's feeling of loss and emptiness over the break-up with Roger. Meanwhile, Martin, Niles and Daphne work together to try to build a TV table. Guest Callers: Scott Hamilton as Caller #1; Daryl Hannah as Caller #2; Olympia Dukakis as Caller #3; Keith Carradine as Carl
215	23	"The Guilt Trippers"	Wil Shriner	Lori Kirkland	May 14, 2002	921	17.23
216	24	"Moons Over Seattle"	Sheldon Epps	Bob Daily	May 21, 2002	923	16.50
Part 1: It is Daphne's birthday. Frasier and Martin buy her a journal, while Niles surprises her with a trip to Hawaii for just the two of them. After a birthday party, Frasier and Roz end up sleeping together. In the morning, she leaves as quickly as possible. Niles travels to England to try to convince Daphne's father to come to Seattle and reconcile with Daphne's mother. Frasier, meanwhile, is worried that Roz's refusal to discuss what happened between them will endanger their relationship, so on hearing that Roz has gone to Wisconsin to attend her family reunion, he decides to fly there and see her. Roz's family mistakes Frasier for Roger and Roz is surprised by his sudden arrival. Finding a moment to themselves, the two talk things out about their relationship and how good friends would do anything to keep them in their lives. At the same time, Niles finds Daphne's father, Harry (Brian Cox), drunk in a pub. Part 2: Niles has flown to Manchester and located Daphne's father, Harry Moon. He attempts to persuade Harry to come to America with him and reconcile with his wife. Harry throws Niles out of the pub six times, and each time Niles tries again. Eventually, Harry agrees to go with him to see Daphne (partially motivated by the fact Niles is willing to pay for the plane ticket, which he ensures is first-class). When Daphne and her mother return from their Hawaiian trip, Daphne is delighted to see her father, but Gertrude is furious and upset. Niles tells Daphne that he had to go and fetch Harry, and Daphne reacts angrily because he never consulted with her first. Still, Niles is determined to keep trying to reunite her parents, and arranges for them to have an expensive dinner together at Chez Henri. The occasion, after a promising start, ends in disaster, and Harry decides to return to England, while Gertrude plans to make her permanent home in America. Daphne begins to lose faith in the idea of true love, but Harry assures her that she's met the right man in Niles and tells her how persistent he was in persuading him to visit. Overwhelmed by how much he is prepared to do to make her wishes come true, Daphne shows up on Niles' doorstep late that night and asks him to marry her immediately. Without a word, Niles leads her out of the apartment.
