= The House of Blue Leaves =

Play written by John Guare

- Poster by James McMullan
- Original language: English
- Written by: John Guare
- Subject: A zookeeper longs to write songs for the movies as his AWOL son and the Pope arrive in New York City.
- Genre: Black comedy
- Setting: A bar and an apartment in Queens, New York, 1965.

Premiere
- Date: 1966
- Place: Eugene O'Neill Theater Center; Waterford, Connecticut

The House of Blue Leaves is a play by American playwright John Guare which premiered Off-Broadway in 1971, and was revived in 1986, both Off-Broadway and on Broadway, and was again revived on Broadway in 2011. The play won the Drama Critics' Circle Award for Best American Play and the Obie Award for Best American Play in 1971. The play is set in 1965, when Pope Paul VI visited New York City.

== Overview ==
The play is set in Sunnyside, Queens, New York City, New York, in 1965, on the day Pope Paul VI visited. The black comedy focuses on Artie Shaughnessy, a zookeeper who dreams of making it big in Hollywood as a songwriter. Artie wants to take his girlfriend Bunny with him to Hollywood. His wife Bananas is a schizophrenic and destined for the institution that provides the play's title. Their son Ronnie, a GI scheduled for deployment to Vietnam, has gone AWOL. Three nuns are eager to see the pope and end up in Artie's apartment. A political bombing mistakenly occurs in the apartment.

== Productions ==
The first act of The House of Blue Leaves was first staged in 1966 at the Eugene O'Neill Theater Center in Waterford, Connecticut. According to Jane Kathleen Curry, (Assistant Professor of Theater at Wake Forest University) Guare "rewrote the second act many times and attributes part of his difficulty to his lack of technical skill in writing for a large number of characters in a full-length play."

The House of Blue Leaves opened on February 10, 1971 Off-Broadway at the Truck and Warehouse Theatre, where it ran for 337 performances. Directed by Mel Shapiro, the cast included Frank Converse, Harold Gould, Katherine Helmond, William Atherton, Anne Meara and Robert Burton.

A revival directed by Jerry Zaks was staged Off-Broadway at the Mitzi E. Newhouse Theater at Lincoln Center for the Performing Arts, opening on March 19, 1986, then transferring to Broadway at the Vivian Beaumont Theater on April 29, 1986, where it played five months before transferring again to the Plymouth Theatre on October 14, 1986, closing on March 15, 1987, for a total run of 398 performances. The Off-Broadway cast included Swoosie Kurtz (Bananas), John Mahoney (Artie), Stockard Channing (Bunny), Christopher Walken (Billy), Ben Stiller (Ronnie, in his stage debut), and Julie Hagerty (Corrinna). Danny Aiello replaced Walken as Billy when the production moved to Broadway. Christine Baranski joined the production on June 24, 1986, as Bunny, and Patricia Clarkson joined the production on June 3, 1986, as Corrinna.

It won the Drama Desk Award for Outstanding Revival. It was also nominated for the Tony Award for Best Play.

A 2011 Broadway revival was staged by David Cromer at the Walter Kerr Theatre. Starring Ben Stiller (Artie), Edie Falco (Bananas), Christopher Abbott (Ronnie), and Jennifer Jason Leigh (Bunny), the production began previews on April 4, opening on April 15 for a limited 16-week engagement.

== Television ==
Directed by Kirk Browning and Jerry Zaks, the play was staged at the Plymouth Theatre in 1987 with Swoosie Kurtz, John Mahoney, Christine Baranski, and Ben Stiller specifically for a broadcast on the PBS series American Playhouse. The telefilm was broadcast in May 1987.

The film adaptation was shot before an audience, with minicams.

== Critical reception ==
Clive Barnes, in his review of the 1971 Off-Broadway production for The New York Times wrote: "You will have noticed, I presume, that comedy has taken on a hysterical edge. The laughter is manic, and the world is awry. Few worlds are more awry than John Guare's, whose play, 'The House of Blue Leaves,' opened last night at the Truck and Warehouse Theater. Mr. Guare's play is mad, funny, at times very funny, and sprawling."

The Variety reviewer of the 2011 revival wrote: "Guare’s iconic play not only holds up, it still sets the bar for smart comic lunacy.... Guare is famous for the zany plots that illustrate his surreal visions of what passes for modern civilization.... But the key to the play lies beyond these apartment walls, in the broader framework of the unsettled period of the mid-Sixties, when America was still reeling from the assassination of JFK and just becoming aware of what was going on in Vietnam."

== Awards and nominations ==
=== 1971 production ===
- New York Drama Critics' Circle Award for Best American Play (winner)
- Obie Award for Best American Play (winner)
- Clarence Derwent Award, Katherine Helmond (winner)

=== 1986 production ===
- Tony Award for Best Play (nomination)
- Tony Award Best Direction of a Play, Jerry Zaks (winner)
- Tony Award Best Featured Actor in a Play, John Mahoney (winner)
- Tony Award Best Featured Actress in a Play

Swoosie Kurtz (winner)
Stockard Channing (nominee)

- Tony Award Best Scenic Design, Tony Walton (winner)
- Tony Award Best Costume Design, Ann Roth (nominee)
- Tony Award Best Lighting Design, Paul Gallo (nominee)
- Theatre World Award, Julie Hagerty (winner)
- Drama Desk Award for Outstanding Revival (winner)
- Drama Desk, Outstanding Set Design, Tony Walton (winner)
- Drama Desk, Outstanding Director, Jarry Zaks (winner)
- Obie Award, Best Performance, Swoosie Kurtz (winner)
- Clarence Derwent Award, John Mahoney (winner)
- Henry Hewes Design Award, Tony Walton (winner)

=== 2011 production ===
- Tony Award Best Featured Actress in a Play – Edie Falco (nominee)
