= Kirk Browning =

American television director and producer

- Born: March 28, 1921; New York City, New York, United States
- Died: February 10, 2008 (aged 86); New York City, New York, United States
- Occupation(s): Television director Television producer
- Years active: 1952–2006

Kirk Browning (March 28, 1921 – February 10, 2008) was an American television director and producer who had hundreds of productions to his credit, including 185 broadcasts of Live from Lincoln Center.

Born in New York City, Browning dropped out of Cornell University after attending for only one month and moved to Waco, Texas, where he was hired as a newspaper reporter. Because of a childhood injury, he was rejected by the United States Army when he tried to enlist during World War II, so he worked as an ambulance driver in England and France. In the late 1940s, he was a chicken farmer operating an egg route in Ridgefield, Connecticut when one of his customers offered him a job in the music library at NBC. The clerical position led to his directing live televised performances by the NBC Symphony Orchestra conducted by Arturo Toscanini. Soon after he was made a stage manager of the network's newly formed opera company, and he later became its director.

Among Browning's many credits are the premiere of the first opera written specifically for television, Gian Carlo Menotti's Amahl and the Night Visitors in 1951; Frank Sinatra's first special in 1957; numerous Hallmark Hall of Fame productions between 1951 and 1958; Live from the Met and Great Performances for PBS; and television adaptations of plays such as June Moon, Damn Yankees!, A Touch of the Poet, The Taming of the Shrew, The Time of Your Life, Tartuffe, Fifth of July, You Can't Take it with You, The House of Blue Leaves, Our Town, and Death of a Salesman, which earned him a nomination for the Directors Guild of America Award for Outstanding Directing - Television Film.

Browning won two Primetime Emmy Awards, one for directing a 1987 production of Gian Carlo Menotti's Goya with Plácido Domingo and the other for his 1988 production of Turandot, both broadcast by PBS, and two Daytime Emmy Awards, for The CBS Festival of Lively Arts for Young People in 1973 and La Gioconda in 1979. He also received two Christopher Awards and a Peabody Award.

Browning died of a heart attack in 2008.

== Selected productions ==
- NBC Opera Theatre: Carmen (1953)
- NBC Opera Theatre: La bohème (1957)
- Kennedy Center Tonight: Stravinsky's Firebird by the Dance Theatre of Harlem (1982)
- American Playhouse: Fifth of July
- Live from Lincoln Center: Zubin Mehta Conducts Beethoven's Ninth with the New York Philharmonic (1983)
- Live from the Metropolitan Opera: Centennial Gala (1984)
- Live from the Metropolitan Opera: Tosca (1985)
- Great Performances: The Gospel at Colonus (1986)
- Verdi's Requiem (1986)
- Great Performances: Gian Carlo Menotti's Goya (1987)
- American Playhouse: The House of Blue Leaves
- Christmas with the Mormon Tabernacle Choir and Shirley Verrett (1987)
- The Metropolitan Opera Presents: Turandot
- A Pavarotti Celebration: Scenes from La Bohème (1989)
- A Streetcar Named Desire (1998)
- Death of a Salesman (2000)
