= Lips Together, Teeth Apart =

Play written by Terrence McNally

Lips Together, Teeth Apart is a 1991 American play written by Terrence McNally. The play which premiered Off-Broadway, concerns two straight couples who spend a weekend in a gay community.

== Plot ==
A gay community in Fire Island provides an unlikely setting for two straight couples spending the Fourth of July weekend in a house inherited by Sally from her brother who died of AIDS. Through monologues unheard by the others, the characters reveal a desperate sense of individual isolation. The only people these four characters find more alien are the unseen gay men partying in the houses on either side of them. "As they divert themselves from their own mortality with food, cocktails, the New York Times crossword puzzle, fireworks, charades, and biting jabs at each other and the boys next door, the two couples find little to celebrate about themselves or their country on its birthday."

== Production history ==
The play opened Off-Broadway in a Manhattan Theatre Club production at New York City Center Stage I on May 28, 1991, and closed on January 5, 1992, after 250 performances. The play transferred to the Lucille Lortel Theatre on January 9, 1992, and closed on June 27, 1992. Directed by John Tillinger, the play was written for the original cast, which featured Christine Baranski (Chloe), Swoosie Kurtz (Sally), Nathan Lane (Sam) and Anthony Heald (John). It was nominated for an Outer Critics Circle Award as Best Off-Broadway Play, and Baranski won the Drama Desk Award for Best Featured Actress in a Play. Lighting design by Ken Billington.

A limited revival was scheduled to open on Broadway on April 29, 2010, at the American Airlines Theatre, through June 20, 2010. Produced by Roundabout Theatre Company and directed by Joe Mantello, the revival was to star Megan Mullally, Lili Taylor, David Wilson Barnes, and Patton Oswalt (in his Broadway debut). On March 24, 2010, Mullally left the production two weeks into rehearsals after creative differences with Mantello. The revival was postponed on March 25, 2010, with artistic director Todd Haimes stating that "they could not find a way to maintain the production schedule under these circumstances"; the production was canceled soon afterwards.

Lips Together, Teeth Apart was produced in 1993 by the Oregon Shakespeare Festival, Ashland, Oregon, and also by the OSF in Portland, Oregon.

== Background ==
There was some controversy about the meaning of the title, which was never clearly defined for the public. The phrase is a suggested mantra dentists use to encourage patients who suffer from stress-induced clenching of the teeth and jaws to lessen the harmful effects. However, reviewer Anita Gates in The New York Times wrote that "the theme of the weekend is mortality (the insect-electrocuting device hangs somewhere on the line between metaphor and parallel), as well as isolation and the exhausting but occasionally fulfilling pursuit of happiness."

In a discussion of the play with the original cast, Kurtz said "The play is at least in part about our responsibility... Specifically the responsibility of heterosexuals to reach out to the gay community in this time of AIDS, to not just turn a blind eye to the situation. But more universally, the play is about whether you can just watch somebody in trouble and think there isn't anything you can do. You can at least try."

McNally said that he wrote Lips Together, Teeth Apart for Lane, Heald and Baranski, as well for as Kathy Bates. When Bates was unable to appear in the new play, Kurtz, a newcomer to the McNally repertory, was offered the role.

== Critical reception ==
David Richards, in an article in The New York Times, called the play "fascinating and ultimately quite touching". He noted that the couples were "out of sync with one another", retreating into their own private activities, and were self-absorbed. Further, they are out of place, in a house where one of the characters' (Sally's) brother has died of AIDS.
