= Baloyi =

Baloyi is a surname. Notable people with this surname include:

- Austin Kulani Baloyi, South African record producer
- Bongani Baloyi (born 1987), South African politician
- Brian Baloyi (born 1974), retired South African association football goalkeeper
- Cassius Baloyi (born 1974), retired professional boxer
- Jabulile Baloyi, South African former player and professional soccer manager
- Kemisetso Baloyi (Born 1998) South African rugby sevens player
- Kulani Baloyi (born 1996), South African cricketer
- Lucky Baloyi (born 1991), South African soccer player
- Madalitso Baloyi, Malawian politician
- Obed Baloyi (born 1970), South African actor
- Olaf Baloyi, South African politician
- Onalenna Baloyi (born 1984), Botswana middle-distance runner
- Richard Baloyi (born 1958), South African politician
- Richard Granville Baloyi, South African politician
- Sponono Baloyi (1940–2021), South African politician
- Theo Baloyi, South African entrepreneur
