= Talloires Declaration on the Civic Roles and Social Responsibilities of Higher Education =

The Talloires Declaration on the Civic Roles and Social Responsibilities of Higher Education is a document which commits its university signatories to expanding and strengthening their civic engagement and social responsibility work through teaching, learning, research, and service.

== History of the Talloires Declaration ==
In September 2005, President Lawrence Bacow of Tufts University convened the Talloires Conference 2005, at Tufts University's European Center in Talloires, France. This conference was the first international gathering of the heads of universities devoted to strengthening the civic roles and social responsibilities of higher education. The meeting brought together 29 university presidents, rectors, and vice chancellors from 23 countries.

The conference gave rise to the Talloires Declaration on the Civic Roles and Social Responsibilities of Higher Education. All signatories of the Declaration have committed their institutions to educating for social responsibility and civic engagement, and to strengthening the application of university resources to the needs of local and global communities. As of July 2012, 247 colleges and universities have signed the Declaration. By signing the Declaration, these institutions have joined the Talloires Network, an association of institutions committed to promoting the civic roles and social responsibilities of higher education.

== Text of the Talloires Declaration on the Civic Roles and Social Responsibilities of Higher Education ==
In this century of change, we note with optimism that access to university education is increasing, that one-half of the students enrolled in institutions of higher education live in developing nations, and that the number of university students worldwide is expected to double between 2000 and 2025. The potential for social participation by students young and old, now and in the years to come, is massive. The extent to which this potential can be realized will depend on universities worldwide mobilizing students, faculty, staff and citizens in programs of mutual benefit.

We are dedicated to strengthening the civic role and social responsibility of our institutions. We pledge to promote shared and universal human values, and the engagement by our institutions within our communities and with our global neighbors. We urge the one hundred million university students, and the many millions of faculty, staff, alumni and members of governing bodies throughout the world to join us in these initiatives.

We believe that higher education institutions exist to serve and strengthen the society of which they are part. Through the learning, values and commitment of faculty, staff and students, our institutions create social capital, preparing students to contribute positively to local, national and global communities. Universities have the responsibility to foster in faculty, staff and students a sense of social responsibility and a commitment to the social good, which, we believe, is central to the success of a democratic and just society.

Some of our universities and colleges are older than the nations in which they are located; others are young and emerging; but all bear a special obligation to contribute to the public good, through educating students, expanding access to education, and the creation and timely application of new knowledge. Our institutions recognize that we do not exist in isolation from society, nor from the communities in which we are located. Instead, we carry a unique obligation to listen, understand and contribute to social transformation and development. Higher education must extend itself for the good of society to embrace communities near and far. In doing so, we will promote our core missions of teaching, research and service.

The university should use the processes of education and research to respond to, serve and strengthen its communities for local and global citizenship. The university has a responsibility to participate actively in the democratic process and to empower those who are less privileged. Our institutions must strive to build a culture of reflection and action by faculty, staff and students that infuses all learning and inquiry.

Therefore, we agree to:

- Expand civic engagement and social responsibility programs in an ethical manner, through teaching, research and public service.
- Embed public responsibility through personal example and the policies and practices of our higher education institutions.
- Create institutional frameworks for the encouragement, reward and recognition of good practice in social service by students, faculty, staff and their community partners.
- Ensure that the standards of excellence, critical debate, scholarly research and peer judgment are applied as rigorously to community engagement as they are to other forms of university endeavor.
- Foster partnerships between universities and communities to enhance economic opportunity, empower individuals and groups, increase mutual understanding and strengthen the relevance, reach and responsiveness of university education and research.
- Raise awareness within government, business, media, charitable, not-for-profit and international organizations about contributions of higher education to social advancement and wellbeing. Specifically, establish partnerships with government to strengthen policies that support higher education’s civic and socially responsible efforts. Collaborate with other sectors in order to magnify impacts and sustain social and economic gains for our communities.
- Establish partnerships with primary and secondary schools, and other institutions of further and higher education, so that education for active citizenship becomes an integral part of learning at all levels of society and stages of life.
- Document and disseminate examples of university work that benefit communities and the lives of their members.
- Support and encourage international, regional and national academic associations in their efforts to strengthen university civic engagement efforts and create scholarly recognition of service and action in teaching and research.
- Speak out on issues of civic importance in our communities.
- Establish a steering committee and international networks of higher education institutions to inform and support all their efforts to carry out this Declaration.

We commit ourselves to the civic engagement of our institutions and to that end we establish the Talloires Network, with an open electronic space for the exchange of ideas and understandings and for fostering collective action.

We invite others to join in this Declaration and to collaborate in our civic work.

== Original Signatories ==
- President Gustavo Alvim, Methodist University of Piracicaba, Brazil
- President David Arnold, American University in Cairo, Egypt
- Rector Azyumardi Azra, Syarif Hidayatullah State Islamic University, Indonesia
- President Lawrence S. Bacow, Tufts University, United States of America
- President Gasim Badri, Ahfad University for Women, Sudan
- Interim Vice-Chancellor Marcus Balintulo, Cape Peninsula University of Technology, South Africa
- President Aaron Ben-Ze'ev, University of Haifa, Israel
- President Crispin P. Betita, Notre Dame of Marbel University, Philippines
- Vice Chancellor Kerry Cox, University of Ballarat, Australia
- Vice Chancellor Julian Crampton, University of Brighton, United Kingdom
- President John J. DeGioia, Georgetown University, United States of America
- President Emeritus John DiBiaggio, Tufts University, United States of America
- Rector Silvio Israel Feldman, National University of General Sarmiento, Argentina
- President Roderick Floud, London Metropolitan University, United Kingdom
- President Mark Gearan, Hobart and William Smith Colleges, United States of America
- Vice Chancellor Brenda Gourley, The Open University, United Kingdom
- Former President Sung-Joo Han, Korea University, South Korea
- President Monica Jimenez de la Jara, Catholic University of Temuco, Chile
- Vice Chancellor John Kaburise, University for Development Studies, Ghana
- President Shamsh Kassim-Lakha, Aga Khan University, Pakistan
- Vice Chancellor Mathew L. Luhanga, University of Dar es Salaam, Tanzania
- Rector Radmila Marinkovic-Neducin, University of Novi Sad, Serbia and Montenegro
- President José Ignacio Moreno León, Metropolitan University at Caracas, Venezuela
- President Sari Nusseibeh, Al-Quds University, Palestine
- Vice Chancellor Janice Reid, University of Western Sydney, Australia
- Vice Chancellor Rupa Shah, SNDT Women's University of Mumbai, India
- Vice Rector Bruno Sion, Saint-Joseph University, Lebanon
- Rector Juan Vela Valdés, University of Havana, Cuba
- President Vo-Tong Xuan, An Giang University, Vietnam
