= Too Late the Phalarope =

1953 novel by Alan Paton

- First US edition (publ. Scribner)
- Author: Alan Paton
- Language: English
- Genre: novel
- Set in: South Africa
- Publisher: Jonathan Cape (RSA)
- Publication date: 1953
- Publication place: South Africa
- Media type: Print (hard~ & paperback)
- Pages: 276
- ISBN: 9780140032161
- Preceded by: Cry, the Beloved Country
- Followed by: Ah, but Your Land Is Beautiful

Too Late the Phalarope is the second novel of Alan Paton, the South African author who is best known for writing Cry, the Beloved Country. It was published in 1953, and was the last novel he published before Ah, but Your Land Is Beautiful in 1981.

The summary on the dust jacket of the first UK edition reads, in part; 'The setting is again South Africa, but the tragedy this time is of a white man who, for complicated reasons, some of them not unconnected with his childhood and training, succumbs to the very temptations he might have been thought strong enough to resist. His downfall is recorded by his father's sister who watched the train of events, half foreseeing the danger yet unable to prevent it, and now in anguish blames herself.'

The main character is Afrikaner policeman Pieter van Vlaanderen. While usually enforcing the country's laws, he eventually breaks the apartheid law outlawing sex between blacks and whites.

Phalaropes are shore birds found in Europe, the Americas, Africa and Asia.

== Reception ==
The literary critic Alfred Kazin reviewed the novel for The New York Times: "What is best in this novel (a Book-of-the-Month Club selection for August) is the atmosphere Mr. Paton conveys of the sultry, brooding tension in South Africa itself - that "heartless land" as the writer James Stern once called it...One understands better, after reading this novel, the hysterical abruptness and open threats that increasingly mark Dr Malan's public pronouncements; one sees all too well the self-deception of a master class which lives on the labor of a vast native population it has condemned to virtual peonage, and which defends itself against its own guilt by living shut up inside a cult of blood and race 'purity'."

Orville Prescott also wrote about the novel for The New York Times: "it is a considerable achievement also, pitiful, dramatic and psychologically interesting."

== Stage adaptation ==
In January 1955 it was reported that producer Mary K. Frank had acquired the rights to adapt the novel as a play for Broadway.

The adaptation by Robert Yale Libott opened at the Belasco Theater on Broadway on October 11, 1956. It was directed by Mary K. Frank and starred Barry Sullivan, Ellen Holly and Finlay Currie. It ran for 36 performances.

Theatre critic Brooks Atkinson reviewed the play for The New York Times: "Then 'Too Late the Phalarope' comes into focus and lays hold of the emotions of the audience as well as the theme of the play. Mr Currie's ferocious righteousness and Mr Sullivan's isolation bring it alive. Everyone concerned has managed to put a fine conclusion to a rambling, overproduced drama."
