= D. C. S. Oosthuizen =

South African philosopher (1926–1969)

Daantjie Oosthuizen
- Born: 15 January 1926; Knysna, South Africa
- Died: 4 April 1969 (aged 43)
- Other name: Daantjie Oosthuizen
- Occupation: Philosopher
- Known for: Philosopher, Christian, Critic of apartheid
- Spouse: Ann Schonland

Daniel Charl Stephanus Oosthuizen (also known as Daantjie Oosthuizen; 15 January 1926 – 4 April 1969) was a South African philosopher, and an early Afrikaner voice against Apartheid. The main direction of his philosophical work lay in the field of epistemology and the philosophy of mind. He was more widely known in South Africa for his moral, political and religious essays, and was described by André Brink as a thorn in the flesh of the establishment. He was a confidant of Beyers Naude, who acknowledged him as having been one of the original group whose discussions and thoughts led to the founding of the Christian Institute of Southern Africa, of which he was both a founder member and a member of the Board of Management. He also contributed to the formation of the University Christian Movement.

== Early life and education ==
Oosthuizen was born in Knysna, South Africa, on 15 January 1926, and died in Grahamstown, South Africa, on 4 April 1969.

He was educated at the Laerskool Pretoria-Oos, the Afrikaanse Hoer Seunskool in Pretoria and the Hoer Volkskool at Graaff-Reinet where he matriculated in the first class in 1942. From 1943 he studied at the University of Stellenbosch and obtained a B.A. in 1945 with distinction in philosophy. In 1947 he passed the M.A. examination in philosophy with a mark of 90%, and in 1949 graduated M.A. cum laude with the thesis Die Verklaringsdrang: aestetieseckomiese oorweging i.v.m. die verklaringsfilosofie in die rigting van ’n eksistensiele dialektiek (The Urge to Explain: Aesthetic-comical and fragmentary considerations concerning the philosophy of explanation in the direction of an existential dialectic.) Through this he is credited, alongside his contemporaries Johan Degenaar and James Oglethorpe, with introducing the work of the Danish philosopher Soren Kierkegaard to Stellenbosch. From 1947 he also studied at the Theological Seminary in Stellenbosch, and in 1949 passed the candidate's examination in theology. From 1950 to 1951 he studied for a year under Prof. G.C. Berkouwer at the Vrije Universiteit in Amsterdam. From 1951 to 1955 he did research in philosophy at the University of Amsterdam, and in June 1955 he passed cum laude in the doctoral examination with a study on the phenomenology of Husserl. He spent sabbatical years at Oxford University in 1962, where Gilbert Ryle was his tutor, and again in 1968.

== Family ==
In 1952 Oosthuizen was married to Ann Schonland, and they had three children.

== Academic employment ==
From June 1949 to December 1950 Oosthuizen was junior lecturer in philosophy at the University of Stellenbosch. From 1955 to 1957 he lectured on the history of philosophy, logic and ethics at the University of the Orange Free State. From January 1958 until his death in April 1969 he was Professor of Philosophy at Rhodes University in Grahamstown. He was appointed Professor of Philosophy at the University of Utrecht in November 1968 but died before he could take up the post.

== Publications ==
Oosthuizen wrote prolifically, presenting his work primarily through public addresses, seminars and lectures. He was an extremely modest man, and published little during his lifetime. The original presentation details (where they are given in the publication) are also provided in brackets below.

=== Writing on Afrikaner Nationalism ===
Oosthuizen's writing as an Afrikaner intellectual have been regarded by the philosopher Johan Degenaar as being on a par with the best work of N P van Wyk Louw in this genre. Four of his essays in this genre were published as Analyses of Nationalism, deconstructing the ideology and texts of Afrikaner Nationalism. The individual papers were:

- ‘“Afrikaans” en “Kultuur”’(dated 1958/60)
- “‘Christelik” en “Christendom”, “Nasionaal” en “Afrikaans” en “Afrikanerdom”’ (dated 1961)
- ‘On ideology and metaphor’ (dated 1961)
- ‘Veelvormige ontwikkelling die Wil van God’(dated 1958)

Also of note are:

- ‘’n Eie Afrikaanse filosofie’, Die Suid Afrikaanse Tydscrif vir Wysbegeerte (The South African Journal of Philosophy), No 5, 1967.
- ‘iets oor “Nasionalisme’”(Unpublished)
- ‘Is did nog ons erns?’ (Unpublished, presented at the Day of the Covenant, 1960).

=== Political, ethical and religious writing ===
- ‘Human rights’, Occasional Papers, Rhodes University Philosophy Department, Vol. 2, No. 2, Dec. 1966
- ‘Christian unity’, Occasional Papers, Rhodes University Philosophy Department, No. 3, March 1967 (dated 1964)
- ‘Oor academiese vryheid’, (‘On Academic Freedom’), Occasional Papers, no 3, March 1967 (dated 1966)
- ‘Is apartheid morally justifiable?’, Occasional Papers, Rhodes University Philosophy Department, No. 5, March 1968 (dated 1967)
- ‘Obedience and suffering’, South African Outlook, Vol. 103, No. 1223, Apr. 1973 (Sermon delivered 1966)

Eight ethical-religious essays were published posthumously in book form under the title, The ethics of illegal action and other essays, SPROCAS/RAVAN, 1973.

- ‘The Ethics of Illegal Action’ (Read to a student audience in 1961, in the aftermath of Sharpeville & Langa).
- ‘Moral scruples about illegal action and violence’(Presented to a discussion group in Oxford in 1968)
- ‘On loyalty’(Read to an audience of Education students in 1963, in the aftermath of the 'Swart' affair at Rhodes University).
- ‘The church in the world’ (First presented 1964)
- ‘Christian service in the academic’ world’(Read to a meeting of the University Christian Movement in Grahamstown, 1967)
- ‘Moral guilt and “sin”’(Read to a discussion group in Oriel College, Oxford, 1968)
- ‘Kierkegaard and existentialism’ (1963)
- ‘Is agnostic apologetics a useful occupation?’(1967)

=== Technical philosophy ===
- ‘Some reflections on assumptions’, Bulletin of the Department of Philosophy, University of Cape Town, No. 7, June 1957
- ‘The sceptical chemist and the unwise philosopher’, Inaugural Lecture, Rhodes University, 1960
- ‘Die konstitusie-probleem in die filosofie van E. Husserl’, Festschrift de Vleeschauwer, UNISA, 1960 (First presented 1957)
- ‘On imagining and believing’, The South African Journal of Philosophy, No. 1, June 1964
- ‘Knowing, believing and ‘interrogatives’, Occasional Papers, Rhodes University Philosophy Department, Vol. 2, No. 2, Dec. 1966 (Dated 1962)
- ‘Philosophy, holism, and evolution’, Occasional Papers, Rhodes University Philosophy Department No. 4, Oct. 1967 (Originally presented 1966)
- ‘The role of imagination in judgements of fact’, Philosophy and Phenomenological Research, Vol. XXIX / No. 1, Sept. 1968(originally presented 1965)
- ‘Phenomenological psychology’, Mind, Vol. LXXIX, 1970
- ‘Thinking-ladders: a suggested out for a set of puzzles’, Philosophical Papers, Vol. 1, No. 1, May 1972 (written 1968)
- ‘Popper, Plato and Plans’, Philosophical Papers, Vol. I, No.2, Oct. 1972 (written 1968)
- ‘About “about’”, Philosophical Papers, Vol. II, No. 1, May 1973(written 1968)

== Memorial lectures ==
Oosthuizen died suddenly at his home in Grahamstown on 4 April 1969. He is remembered through the annual D. C. S. Oosthuizen Memorial Lecture at Rhodes University, which has a theme on Academic Freedom, and his life was celebrated by Alan Paton in the first of these lectures in 1970.
