= Sonido Tré =

Puerto Rican Vocal trio with Cuatro

- Also known as: Sonido Tré
- Years active: 2014–present
- Labels: QD Records (2013)
- Website: sonidotre.com

Sonido Tré is a latin music trio comprising vocalists Mayda Belén Rivera and Edgar Ríos, and Quique Domenech on Cuatro. All three members were born in Puerto Rico. Domenech studied the cuatro from the age of six. At 11 he entered a five-year program at the Institute of Puerto Rican Culture studying the cuatro and music theory. He has been nominated twice for a Latin Grammy. Rivera was a semifinalist on Latin American Idol (season 2). The newest member of Sonido Tré is Edgar Ríos. Ríos was a member of the a cappella group Nota, winners of the NBC show The Sing-Off.

== History ==
=== Background ===
Sonido Tré (originally called Tré) evolved over time, as each had occasion to work with the others on various projects. They began to work together more regularly after the death of Tony Croatto, who Domenech had recorded with regularly. Their group consisted of Rivera in vocals, Rios as a backing voice, and Domenech on Cuatro. As demand came for their sound, the trio formed, and took the name Tré (three in Puerto Rican Spanish).

Domenech and Rivera, his wife, moved with their children to Central Florida in 2015. Domenech felt the move was necessary for the betterment of his family, and the increased opportunities to share his music. Ríos remains in Puerto Rico, with each traveling as necessary for live performances.

== Career ==
=== Prior to 2019 ===
Prior to joining Sonido Tré, Rivera was a semifinalist in Latin American Idol 2007. Ríos, with the group Nota won the NBC a cappella show 'The Sing-Off’ in 2009. The trio recorded their album ‘Tré’ in 2014, and 'Tré en Vivo' in 2015.

Sonido Tré joined Puerto Rican tenor Fernando Varela in singing a medley of “En Mi Viejo San Juan / Preciosa” for the taping of Varela's PBS Special “Coming Home’. They performed in two concerts with the Colombian singer Carlos Vives, the first in Miami in 2016, and then in Orlando in 2017.

They toured Puerto Rico in early to mid 2017, with their ‘Blessing’ tour, a presentation designed to be inspirational and identifiable for their Puerto Rican audience. They returned to Puerto Rico again in late 2018 for their concert ‘Legacy’, performing together with the a cappella group Nota.

In November 2017, the group joined Fernando Varela in his Fernando and Friends for Puerto Rico. The concert was held in the Sharon L. Morse Performing Arts Center at The Villages, Florida, with 100% of the proceeds being given to PRxPR to aid in the recovery efforts and rebuilding of Puerto Rico. Varela was able to give 100% of ticket sales directly to aid Puerto Rico, with every typical cost associated with presenting the concert having been donated. Fully 100% of the labor, talent and equipment for the concert was given in donation, so that all of the proceeds would go directly to help Puerto Rico.

=== 2019 to Present ===
In February 2019, while in the process of working on their latest EP, Sonido Tré had the opportunity to open a concert for David Foster at the Sharon Morse Performing Arts Center, The Villages

Early 2020, Sonido Tré released their EP "Tributo a Juan Luis Guerra” in tribute to Juan Luis Guerra, a Dominican Musician with over 70 million records sold, and 21 Latin Grammys. The EP consisted of four songs by Guerra, but performed in a style consistent with that of Sonido Tré. Including “Ojalá que llueva café; “Estrellitas y duendes”; “No aparecen”; y “La Bilirrubina”, the recordings by Sonido Tré honor the originals, but are arranged and performed with their own flair.

In March, Sonido Tré joined Tenor Fernando Varela for his “Four Divo” concert to raise funds for the earthquake victims in Southwestern Puerto Rico, an area already recently affected by Hurricane Maria. The trio joined Varela in a medley of “Preciosa” and “En Mi Viejo San Juan”. A portion of the proceeds from the concert went to PRxPR, a Puerto Rican organization which invests 100% of their donations directly to the communities they support.

During the Coronavirus lockdown Sonido Tré continued to work on their new music, releasing in April 2020 their music video and single "Let it Be". The song was recorded by musicians all over the world from their homes. The accompanying music video also includes dancers and families from all over the world, as well as pictures of front line workers aiding in the Coronavirus response.

== Discography ==
=== Singles ===
- Amor Vivido (Feb 3, 2015)
- Mi Barrio (Nov 24, 2016)
- Amar o Morir (Apr 4, 2016)
- Puerto Rico feat Lo5 (Aug 2, 2016)
- Monticielo (Jan 9, 2018)
- Ojalá Que Llueva Café (May 17, 2019)

=== Albums ===
- Sinfónico (April 9, 2013)
- Tré Rereleased as Sonido Tré (Feb 10 2014)
- Tré en Vivo EP (March 25, 2015)
- Tributo a Juan Louis Guerra EP (Feb 14, 2020)
- Blessings Mayda Belén EP (April, 2020)

== See also ==
- Quique Domenech
- Nota
- Fernando Varela
