= La Jolla Playhouse =

American stage theater

Coordinates: 32°52′15.18″N 117°14′28.77″W

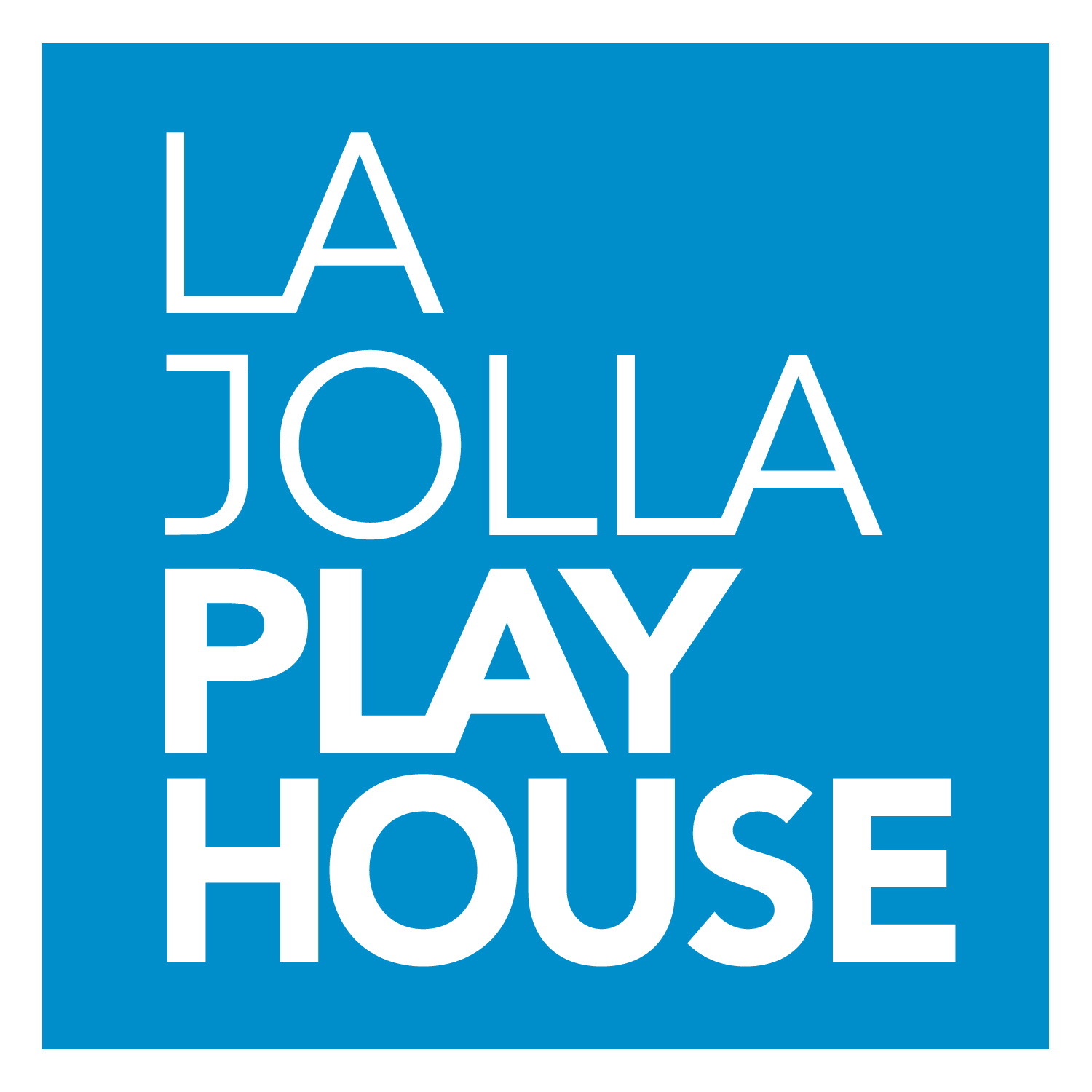

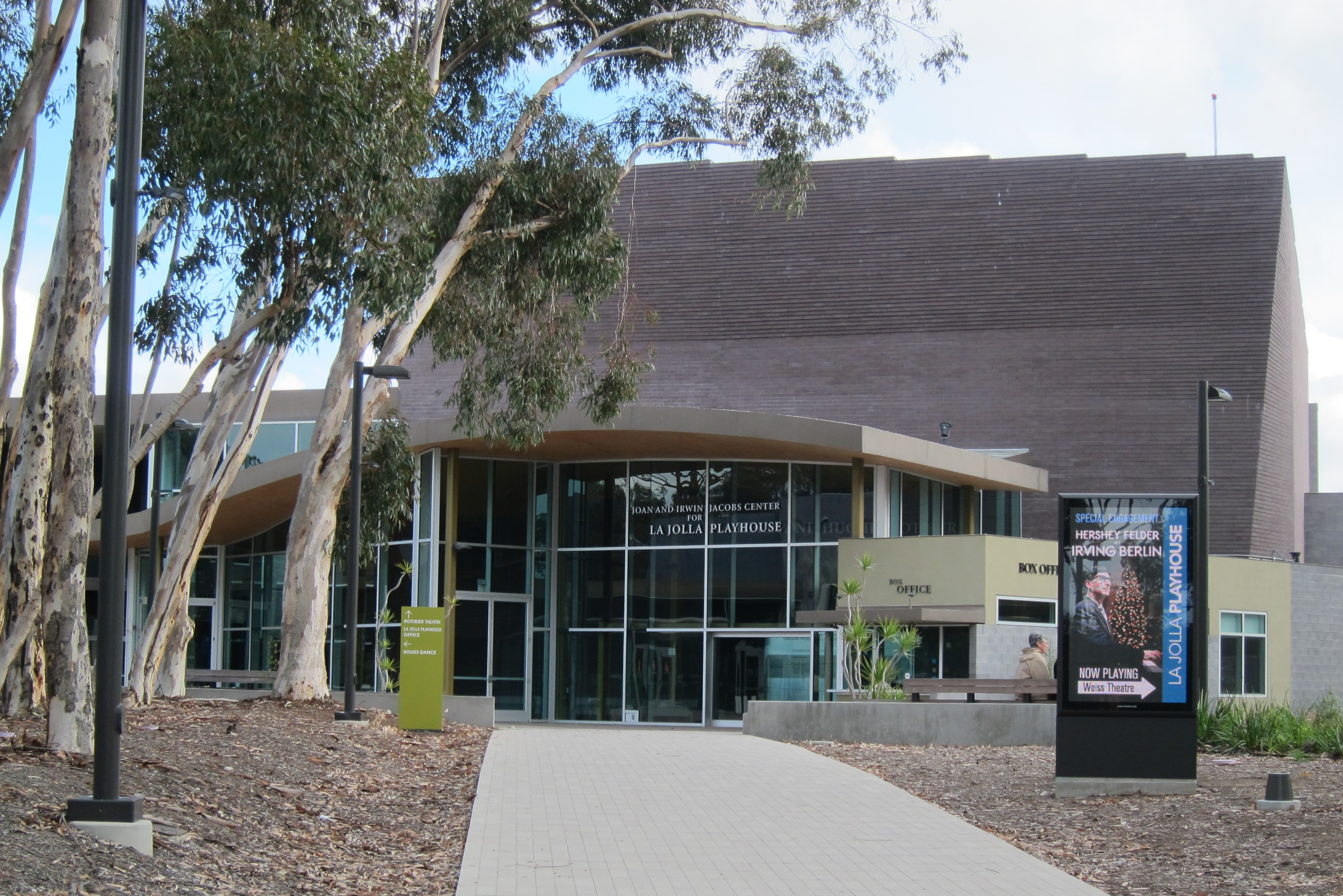
- Joan and Irwin Jacobs Center at La Jolla Playhouse
- Formation: 1947
- Founders: Gregory Peck, Dorothy McGuire, Mel Ferrer
- Location: San Diego, California
- Artistic Director: Jessica Stone
- Website: lajollaplayhouse.org

La Jolla Playhouse is a nonprofit professional theater on the campus of the University of California, San Diego.

== History ==
La Jolla Playhouse was founded in 1947 by Gregory Peck, Dorothy McGuire, and Mel Ferrer. In 1983, it was revived under the leadership of Des McAnuff. Since then, the Playhouse's repertoire has included 132 world premieres, thirty-two West Coast premieres, and eight American premieres, and has won more than three hundred honors, including the 1993 Tony Award as America's Outstanding Regional Theatre. It is supported, in part, by grants from the National Endowment for the Arts, the California Arts Council, the City of San Diego, and the County of San Diego. It was announced on April 10, 2007, that Christopher Ashley would succeed McAnuff as artistic director. On November 18, 2025, Jessica Stone was announced as the new artistic director, taking over for Christopher Ashley.

Among the 37 productions that originated at the Playhouse before finding success on Broadway are The Who's Tommy, Come from Away, Thoroughly Modern Millie, Big River, Matthew Broderick's revival of How to Succeed in Business Without Really Trying, Freaky Friday, Bonnie and Clyde, the Pulitzer Prize-winning I Am My Own Wife, 700 Sundays, Jersey Boys, Memphis, Peter and the Starcatcher, SUMMER: The Donna Summer Musical, The Outsiders and Redwood with Idina Menzel which opened on Broadway in 2025.

== Programs ==
La Jolla Playhouse is nationally renowned for the development of new work. In addition to a robust commissioning program and ongoing workshops and readings, the Playhouse annually hosts programs that foster the development of new plays and musicals, such as the DNA New Work Series, which offers playwrights and directors the opportunity to develop a script from its earliest stages; the popular and widely acclaimed Without Walls (WOW) series of immersive and site-inspired work; as well as the Veterans Playwriting Workshop, Latinx New Play Festival and biennial Director Fellowship.

La Jolla Playhouse also offers a number Learning & Engagement opportunities for children, teens, and adults interested in theatre, both on and off the stage. The Performance Outreach Program (POP Tour) annually brings a professional, world-premiere production to schools, libraries, and community centers throughout San Diego. There are also opportunities for youth through the La Jolla Playhouse Conservatory, student matinees, teen council, and numerous school workshops and classes.

=== Page to Stage ===
La Jolla Playhouse began the "Page to Stage Play Development Program" in 2001 to facilitate the development of new plays and musicals, offering audiences the rare opportunity to experience the "birth" of a play and take part in its evolution. As a Page to Stage workshop, a production will feature minimal sets and costumes, and will be revised throughout its entire process, including performances. After the performance, audience feedback sessions will provide insight and suggestion for both the creative team and the actors. In the 22 years since the program began, two Page to Stage Productions have gone on to win Tony Awards. Doug Wright's I Am My Own Wife won the 2004 Pulitzer Prize for Drama and Tony Awards for Best Play and Best Leading Actor in a Play (Jefferson Mays); and Billy Crystal's 700 Sundays, a 2004 Page to Stage Production, won the 2005 Tony Award for Special Theatrical Event.

== Management ==
=== Managing directors ===
- 1981–1991: Alan Levey
- 1992–2004: Terry Dwyer
- 2005–2008: Steven Libman
- 2009–2018: Michael S. Rosenberg
- 2018–current: Debby Buchholz

== Artists ==
=== Artistic directors ===
- 1947–1959: Gregory Peck, Dorothy McGuire, Mel Ferrer (founders)
- 1983–1994: Des McAnuff
- 1995–1999: Michael Greif
- 1999–2000: Anne Hamburger
- 2000–2007: Des McAnuff
- 2007–2025: Christopher Ashley
- 2026-current: Jessica Stone

=== Notable actors ===
- Amy Aquino
- Tallulah Bankhead
- Heidi Blickenstaff
- Stephen Bogardus
- Christian Borle
- Matthew Broderick
- Danny Burstein
- Phoebe Cates
- Kim Cattrall
- Anna Chlumsky
- James Coburn
- Billy Crystal
- Ariana DeBose
- Dana Delaney
- Dann Florek
- Hunter Foster
- Sutton Foster
- Beth Gallagher
- John Goodman
- David Marshall Grant
- Ann Harada
- Neil Patrick Harris
- Dennis Hopper
- Linda Hunt
- Holly Hunter
- Laura Innes
- Bill Irwin
- Joanna Levesque
- Laura Linney
- Jon Lovitz
- Groucho Marx
- James Maslow
- James Mason
- Jefferson Mays
- Marin Mazzie
- Idina Menzel
- Cynthia Nixon
- Peter Paige
- Jennifer Paredes
- Jim Parsons
- Amanda Plummer
- Alice Ripley
- Wynn Harmon
- George Salazar
- Campbell Scott
- Helen Shaver
- Gary Sinise
- Alexandra Slade
- Nancy Travis
- Vivian Vance
- Daphne Rubin-Vega
- Sherie Rene Scott
- Malcolm-Jamal Warner
- Ron Richardson
- BD Wong

== Productions ==
=== La Jolla Playhouse to Broadway ===
Production	La Jolla Playhouse	Broadway	Tony Awards
Big River	1984	1985	Best Musical; Best Book of a Musical; Best Original Score; Best Performance by a Featured Actor in a Musical; Best Direction of a Musical; Best Scenic Design; Best Lighting Design
A Walk in the Woods	1987	1988	
Dangerous Games	1989	1989	
The Grapes of Wrath	1989	1991	Best Play
The Who's Tommy	1992	1993	Best Direction of a Musical; Best Choreography; Best Original Score; Best Scenic Design; Best Lighting Design
How to Succeed in Business Without Really Trying	1994	1995 (revival)	Best Actor in a Musical
An Almost Holy Picture	1995	2002	
The Green Bird	1996	2000	
Harmony	1997	2023	
Jane Eyre	1999	2000	
Thoroughly Modern Millie	2000	2002	Best Musical; Best Performance by a Leading Actress in a Musical; Best Performance by a Featured Actress in a Musical; Best Choreography; Best Orchestrations; Best Costume Design
Dracula, the Musical	2001	2004	
I Am My Own Wife	2001	2004	Best Play; Best Actor in a Play
700 Sundays	2004	2004	
Jersey Boys	2004	2005	Best Musical; Best Performance by a Leading Actor in a Musical; Best Performance by a Featured Actor in a Musical; Best Lighting Design of a Musical
Doctor Zhivago (premiered as Zhivago)	2006	2015	
The Farnsworth Invention	2007	2007	
Cry Baby	2007	2008	
33 Variations	2008	2009	Best Scenic Design of a Play
Memphis	2008	2009	Best Musical; Best Book of a Musical; Best Original Score; Best Orchestrations
Bonnie and Clyde	2009	2011	
Peter and the Starcatcher	2009	2012	Best Performance by a Featured Actor in a Play; Best Sound Design of a Play; Best Lighting Design of a Play; Best Costume Design of a Play; Best Scenic Design of a Play
Ghetto Klown (premiered as John Leguizamo: Diary of a Madman)	2010	2011	
Chaplin	2010	2012	
Jesus Christ Superstar	2011	2012 (revival)	
Hands on a Hardbody	2012	2013	
Side Show	2013	2014	
Indecent	2015	2017	Best Direction of a Play; Best Lighting Design of a Play
Come from Away	2015	2017	Best Direction of a Musical
John Leguizamo: Latin History for Morons	2016	2017	Special Tony Award
Junk: The Golden Age of Debt	2016	2017	
SUMMER: The Donna Summer Musical	2017	2018	
Escape to Margaritaville	2017	2018	
Diana	2019	2020	
Lempicka	2022	2024	
The Outsiders	2023	2024	Best Musical; Best Direction of a Musical; Best Lighting Design of a Musical; Best Sound Design in a Musical
Redwood	2024	2025	
Here there are Blueberries	2022	2026	
