= Intercalary chapter =

An intercalary chapter (also called an inner chapter, inserted chapter, or interchapter) is a chapter in a novel or novella that is relevant to the theme, but does not involve the main characters or further the plot. Intercalary chapters often take the form of vignettes that offer a broader or alternative perspective to the experiences of the main character. They can also be used to provide social and historical background that can't be easily interwoven into the narrative chapters.

== Examples ==
The following novels make use of intercalary chapters:

- American Gods by Neil Gaiman
- Cry, the Beloved Country by Alan Paton
- The Grapes of Wrath, by John Steinbeck
- The Left Hand of Darkness by Ursula K. Le Guin
- Moby-Dick; or, The Whale by Herman Melville
- Tom Jones by Henry Fielding
- War and Peace by Leo Tolstoy
- The Ministry for the Future by Kim Stanley Robinson
- Chronicle in Stone by Ismail Kadare
- The Black Book by Orhan Pamuk
- Les Misérables by Victor Hugo
- The Waves by Virginia Woolf
- Aunt Julia and the Scriptwriter by Mario Vargas Llosa
