= The Journey Continues =

The Journey Continues may refer to:

- The Journey Continues (Bradley Joseph album), 2003
- The Journey Continues (Tommy Emmanuel album), 1994 re-release of The Journey
- The Journey Continues, an album by Djabe and Steve Hackett, 2021
- The Journey Continues, an album by Journey, 2001
- "The Journey Continues", a song by Mark Brown, featuring Sarah Cracknell, 2007

== See also ==
- Journey Continued, a 1988 autobiography by Alan Paton
