= Fernando Varela (singer) =

American opera singer

Background information
- Born: Fernando Julio Varela; May 1, 1980 (age 46); San Juan, Puerto Rico,
- Genres: Classical, Pop Music, Classical Crossover
- Occupation: Recording Artist
- Instrument: Vocalist
- Years active: 1997–present
- Labels: Universal Music Group, Universal Classics, Deutsche Grammophon, Verve Label Group
- Member of: The Serenad3
- Formerly of: Forte Tenors
- Website: https://www.fernandovarela.com

Fernando Varela (born May 1, 1980) is a Puerto Rican operatic and classical crossover tenor, who has performed in staged operas, as a member of the classical crossover trio Forte Tenors, and as a solo artist. As a solo artist, he has toured internationally with David Foster, and also tours independently, having completed a European tour in 2016. In 2017, Varela debuted his PBS special "Fernando Varela: Coming Home", performed at the Grammy Museum Gala honoring David Foster, and joined Sarah Brightman on the Royal Christmas Gala tour November - December, 2017. From 2018 into 2020, Varela has toured extensively with David Foster, and has participated in several charitable events.

== Early years ==
Born in San Juan, Puerto Rico, Varela's family moved to central Florida when he was 8. He began singing at age 17 because he was "chasing after a girl who was an opera singer." At age 18, he auditioned for the music program at the University of Central Florida, where "they laughed at me. They told me I didn’t have what it took to be a singer." Varela said that was the spark that made him decide to pursue singing "for real."

== Career ==
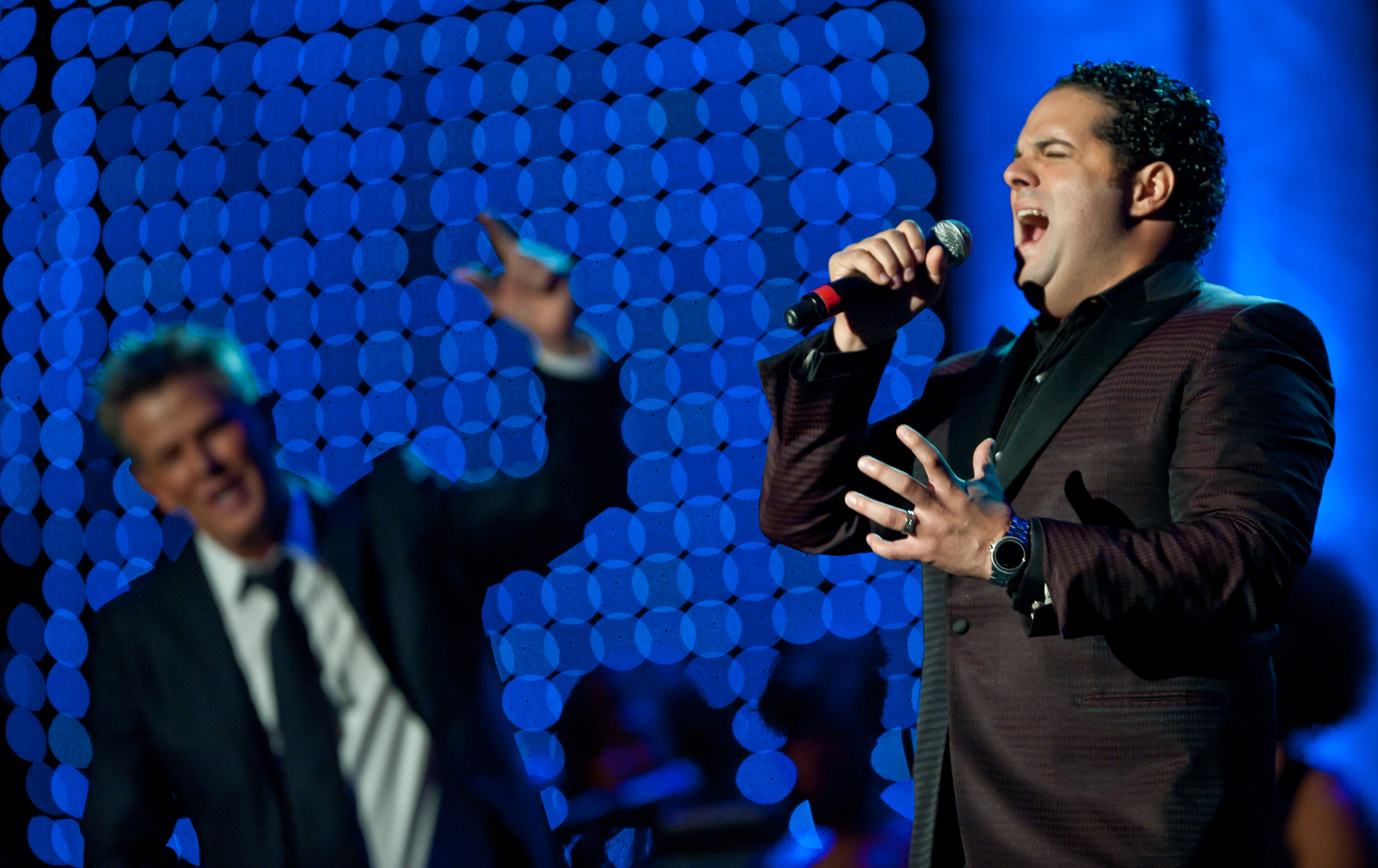
Fernando singing with David Foster at the Mandalay Bay Arena in 2011

Discovered by David Foster in his Born to Sing competition, Varela has since performed with David on multiple tours in over 31 countries across the globe. Singing anything from Nessun Dorma to taking on all the parts in Bohemian Rhapsody in a solo performance, Varela's music spans a range of genres. David said of him "Luciano Pavarotti has been reborn! Varela has the voice and personality of a superstar." After performing in The Puerto Rican Day Parade in New York City (produced by Walt Disney Entertainment, televised by Telemundo), Varela was approached by, and invited to study under Metropolitan Opera’s assistant director, Joan Dornemann. Varela has also been mentored by Mme. Licia Albanese, as well as by Maestro Giancarlo Chiaramello, conductor for Luciano Pavarotti. The Maestro said of Varela, "I have heard very few voices like yours." In Central Florida, Varela worked extensively with Bill Doherty, under whom Varela performed with the Central Florida Lyric Opera. He has also performed with the Palm Beach Opera, having performed in a total of 16 fully staged operas. As of fall 2014, Varela embarked on a 50 city tour of the US and Canada.

Varela was a founding member of the classical crossover group Forte Tenors, who placed 4th on Season 8 of America's Got Talent . As a ChildFund LIVE! artist, Varela, along with his wife Susan, traveled to Ecuador, and have been working to help find sponsorship of every child in the village they visited. He was named to Huffington Post's list of 50 Top Latino Voices To Follow On Twitter. Varela is also a producer, having produced his own albums and those of several other artists, as well as numerous events and shows in Central Florida and across the country.

Varela has recently completed production of his newest CD, "Vivere". This CD is being produced by Patrick Hamilton, who has also recently produced a chart-topping CD for Katherine Jenkins. Varela traveled to London to record with the orchestra and choir at Abbey Road Studios. He performed in his "Back to my Roots" concert, his first in Puerto Rico, on August 22, 2015, along with Puerto Rican group Tré, and accompanied by William Joseph, pianist and composer. In the fall of 2015, Varela headlined the Night of the Proms tour, held at the Rotterdam Ahoy, Netherlands, and the Sportpaleis in Antwerp Belgium through November, along with dates in Germany all throughout December. Tour goers and critics have shared reviews such as this "The name that will surely be remembered is that of the classical tenor Fernando Varela. He is a master of his craft, but also dares to color outside the lines."

As of December 1, 2015 it was announced that Varela has been signed by Deutsche Grammophon, and his new CD under their label was released March 10, 2017. Vois Des Arts noted in a recent review "There is in the atmosphere of Varela’s new disc Vivere something of the sense of inexpressible triumph that <Maria> Callas must have felt when Chicagoans’ ovations for her singing of ‘Un bel dì vedremo’ resounded in the Civic Opera House. Rather than contorting himself into others’ musical molds, Varela finds and refines the music within himself. Vivere is not a disc that aims to say ‘I told you so’ to harsh judges. Rather, the singer says to the listener, ‘I told me so.’ ", and concluded their review with "This is what Vivere ultimately conveys most arrestingly: these are the sounds of a modern troubadour living through music."

March 2016 found Varela touring Belgium and The Netherlands to promote the release of his new CD. June and July saw Fernando singing as a special guest to trumpet player Chris Botti. July also offered Fernando the opportunity to sing in front of some 250,000 soccer fans at Berlin's Brandenburg Gate prior to Germany's Euro 2016 Semi-Final match with France. In August, Varela performed as the opening act for Lionel Richie, at the Universal Inside 2016 event at Berlin's Mercedes Benz Arena, as well as singing with the Fireworks at Potsdamer Schlössernacht at Sanssouci. He has also recently completed taping of a PBS television special that began airing beginning in March 2017, to include a live taping of his "Coming Home" concert held in front of a sold-out crowd on November 30, 2016 at the Dr. Phillips Center for the Performing Arts in his hometown of Orlando, Florida. A duet of "A Thousand Years" with Jackie Evancho recorded live during this concert, has been included on Evancho's CD "Two Hearts"

Immediately before leaving to join Sarah Brightman on the Royal Christmas Gala tour, Fernando responded to the devastation of his home island of Puerto Rico by hurricanes Irma and Maria by organizing a benefit concert. Within a very short timeframe, Fernando produced and presented Fernando and Friends for Puerto Rico. The concert was held in the Sharon L. Morse Performing Arts Center at The Villages, Florida, with 100% of the proceeds being given to PRxPR to aid in the recovery efforts and rebuilding of Puerto Rico. Fernando was able to give 100% of ticket sales directly to aid Puerto Rico, with every typical cost associated with presenting the concert having been donated. Fully 100% of the labor, talent and equipment for the concert was given in donation, so that all of the proceeds would go directly to help Puerto Rico.

2019 began for Varela with his production company, Victory Productions, hosting the reunited AGT finalist lineup of Forte, in an early February sold-out run of four shows at The Sharon L. Morse Performing Arts Center, in The Villages, Florida. The trio of Varela, Panikkar and Page brought the audience to its feet repeatedly during their four day run. A week later, Varela returned to The Sharon, as he played host to David Foster in his first visit to The Villages, in a run of four shows in which Varela also performed. In March, Varela performed in the ceremony honoring Emilio and Gloria Estefan as recipients of the 2019 Library of Congress Gershwin Prize, at the DAR Hall in Washington, DC., to be aired on PBS nationwide on May 3, 2019. David Foster, acting as a judge on Asia's Got Talent (season 3) brought in Varela and Pia Toscano to perform as part of the shows finals. Varela performed Josh Groban’s “You Raise Me Up”. Among many other Charity Concerts, in May 2019, Varela performed at the Breast Cancer Research Foundation's Annual Hot Pink Party at the Park Avenue Armory. In summer 2019, Varela again toured in Canada with David Foster Finishing 2019, Varela appeared on David Foster's "An Intimate Evening with David Foster", hosted by PBS, and also offered to viewers as a DVD, and available to the public on CD, and download. Along with Varela, the show included Foster's wife Katherine McPhee, Pia Toscano, Loren Allred, and Shelea. The show first aired November 30, 2019.

In March 2020, Varela responded to the recent earthquake disaster in Puerto Rico with another benefit show, again with the proceeds being given to PRxPR. The show featured Four Divo, which included Varela, operatic Baritone Craig Irvin, Villages local and Harold S. Schwartz Music Scholarship recipient tenor Devin Eatmon, and Varela's fellow Forte member Josh Page. Also included is Varela’s wife soprano Susan Williams, and Puerto Rican trio Sonido Tré.

In April, given the isolation brought upon by the coronavirus pandemic, Varela's Victory Productions responded by supporting Belleview, FL's St. Paul Parish (where Varela is acting Music Director) by producing online Sunday Masses, with Fernando and Susan Varela providing the Music Ministry. Additionally, Varela presented a number of free Livestream performances, with the request for donations to support local charities.

Varela joined with baritone Craig Irvin and tenor Devin Eatmon to form The Serenad3, releasing their debut album Christmas Serenade in late November 2020. The featured single on the album is Silent Night, a collaboration with David Foster, who arranged the song, and accompanied the trio on piano, and featured vocals by Gloria Estefan. David Foster said of the album, that it's "A spectacular Christmas album. Every song, a masterpiece. It's a magical musical journey." The trio appeared as "The Christmas Tenors" to wrap up the Open Air Concert Series put on by Varela's Victory Productions at The Villages Polo Fields. They also were featured in the Dr. Phillips Center for the Performing Arts Front Yard Festival, also an open air series on the grounds of the Orlando Dr. Phillips Center.

== Discography ==
- Caruso – (with Forte Tenors) single, Sony/Columbia Records (digital release)
- Forte – (with Forte Tenors) album, Sony/Columbia Records, Released November 12, 2013
- Defining The Moment Released 2005
- Dare to Live Released December 23, 2008
- Prelude Released September 10, 2012
- Inspiration Released September 13, 2012
- Vivere - Deutsche Gramophone, Released March 10, 2017
- An Intimate Evening with David Foster (2019)
- Silent Night - (with The Serenad3, David Foster, Gloria Estefan) single, Released November 23, 2020
- Christmas Serenade - (with The Serenad3), Released November 24, 2020
- Romantic Serenade (with The Serenad3), Released Feb 12, 2021

== See also ==
- The Serenad3
- List of Puerto Ricans
