= D. C. S. Oosthuizen Memorial Lecture =

Lecture at Rhodes University, South Africa

The D. C. S. Oosthuizen Memorial Lecture at Rhodes University, dedicated to the memory of the philosopher D. C. S. Oosthuizen, was founded in 1970 and is held annually. The lectures are organised by the university's Academic Freedom Committee.

== Lectures ==
- 1970 Alan Paton, Inaugural lecture
- 1971 Jean Sinclair
- 1978 Frederik van Zyl Slabbert, Some reflections on academic freedom
- 1979 Geoff Budlender, The university and the new foreigners.
- 1980 G. R. Bozzoli, Change is Not Made Without Inconvenience
- 1982 Helen Joseph
- 1983 Nadine Gordimer, Living in the Interregnum
- 1984 Mark Orkin, Forced to be Free
- 1985 Allistair Sparks
- 1989 Jakes Gerwel
- 1990 Frederik van Zyl Slabbert
- 1991 Albie Sachs, Black is beautiful, brown is beautiful, white is beautiful: towards a rainbow culture in a united South Africa
- 1992 S. M. E. Bengu, The university and a free society
- 1993 Mahmood Mamdani, Universities in crisis : a reflection on the African experience
- 1994 Cheryl Carolus, Reconstruction and development is not a spectator sport: what is the role of our universities?
- 1995 Brenda Gourley
- 1996 Jairam Reddy, The university in contemporary society - the South African challenge
- 1997 Itumaleng Mosala
- 1998 Dennis Davis, The new nationalism: is there a future for South African universities?
- 1999 Mamphela Ramphele, The responsibility side of the academic freedom debate
- 2000 Malegapuru Makgoba, The university in a developing free society : challenges to autonomy and academic freedom
- 2001 Neville Alexander, Language Policy, Symbolic Power and the Democratic Responsibility of the Post-Apartheid University
- 2002 Jonathan D. Jansen, Is Race / Ethnicity Back?
- 2003 (No lecture was held)
- 2004 The lecture was replaced by a symposium, with the following speakers:

André du Toit, The Legacy of Daantjie Oosthuizen:Revisiting the Liberal Defence of Academic Freedom
Andrew Nash, Dialogue Alone: D. C. S. Oosthuizen’s Engagement with Three Philosophical Generations
Charles Villa Vincencio, Thinking Outside the Hut
Ian Macintosh, D. C. S. Oosthuizen's Legacy

- 2005 Naledi Pandor, African Universities and the Challenges of a Developmental State
- 2006 Chris Brink, Putting a price on academic ′freedom′ (This lecture was postponed and actually delivered in 2007)
- 2007 Ferial Haffajee
- 2008 Barney Pityana, On Academic Freedom
- 2009 Cheryl de la Rey, Academic Freedom – A Contested Good
- 2010 Mac Maharaj
- 2011 Blade Nzimande, The role of universities in a transformed post-school education and training system
- 2012 (No lecture was held)
- 2013 Silvia Federici, Academic Freedom and the Enclosure of Knowledge in the Global University
- 2014 Lis Lange, Thinking Academic Freedom
- 2015 Bruce Janz, "Free Space in the Academy"
- 2016 Eusebius McKaiser, Epistemic Injustices: The dark side of academic freedom
- 2017 Papama Nomboniso Gasa, Sexual and Gender Based Violence: Holding up a mirror to the South African society today
- 2018 Nomathamsanqa Tisani, Lost opportunities and pervading hope in South African Higher Education

== Links ==
http://dcsoosthuizen.blogspot.co.uk/ (a memorial site to D. C. S. Oosthuizen) has further links to a number of the lectures
