= Josh Page =

American operatic tenor

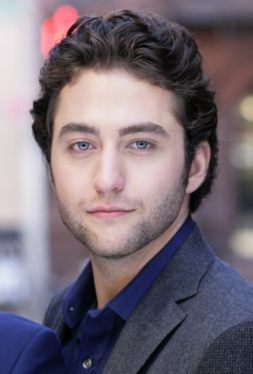
- Page in 2015

Background information
- Years active: 2009–present
- Member of: Forte; Brothers Page
- Website: brotherspage.com

Josh Page (born February 27, 1990) is an American operatic tenor who performs individually, as a member of Brothers Page with his brother Zach Page, and as a member of Forte, featured on America's Got Talent.

== Career ==
In 2009, Page won David Foster's Foster & Friends Competition singing "Because we Believe". In 2011, Page was called onto the stage at a Josh Groban concert at Madison Square Garden, and sang "The Prayer" with Groban. A YouTube video of that performance has since garnered over 10 million views.

Page contacted Fernando Varela via YouTube, and the two found a third member to form Forte. The group then auditioned for season eight of America's Got Talent, where they advanced to the finals and finished in fourth place.

Soon after their appearances, Forte released a self-titled album on the Columbia Records label. Page said, "part of my vision for Forte is people from different cultures creating a harmony together, one sound. We've had 16- to 18-year-old kids come up to us on the street and say 'Would never have listened to music like this before, but we just love your voices and the sound.'"

In December 2013, Page performed at the lighting of the UNICEF Snowflake, at the corner of Fifth Avenue and 57th Street in New York City. In 2017, Page was honored at the March Bistro Awards Critics' Pick Madame Mathieu's Soiree, put on by Cabaret Patroness Madame Mathieu.

In addition to his solo performances and appearances with Forte, Page continues to perform with his brother Zach as the Brothers Page; their Instagram account has gained over a million followers. The duo add a new video to their Instagram profile each week. In 2017, they performed at the #LOVE IS LOVE concert at W Times Square.

== Discography ==
=== Singles ===
- Caruso, as a member of Forte (2013)
- Game of Thrones, as a member of Forte (2015)
- A Sky Full of Stars, Brothers Page (2015)
- Feel It Still, Brothers Page (2018)
- Warrior Love, Brothers Page (2019)
- Back to You, Brothers Page (2019)
- Strange Direction, Brothers Page (2019)
- Anymore, Brothers Page (2019)
- Won't Stop/The Light, Brothers Page (2019)
- Meet Up, Brothers Page (2020)

=== Albums ===
- FORTE, as a member of Forte (2013)
- The Future Classics, as a member of Forte (2016)
- Insta-Tunes, Brothers Page (2019)
- Back to You, Brothers Page (2019)

== Filmography ==
=== Television ===
Year	Title	Role	Notes
2009	Law & Order: Special Victims Unit	Shane Newsome	Episode: "Turmoil"
