= Ah, but Your Land Is Beautiful =

1983 novel by Alan Paton

- First US edition (publ. Scribner)
- Author: Alan Paton
- Publisher: Jonathan Cape (UK); Scribner (US)
- Publication date: 1981
- Pages: 271
- ISBN: 978-0-14-006478-0
- OCLC: 20717293

Ah, But Your Land Is Beautiful (1981) is the third and final novel by South African author Alan Paton. Ah, But Your Land is Beautiful is set in the 1950s, after apartheid was established in postwar South Africa. The historical novel explores fictional characters interacting with historical figures working to resist these laws.

Paton's previous novel, Too Late the Phalarope was published twenty-eight years earlier in 1953. Paton originally conceived of the book as the first part of a trilogy.

The novel was first published by Jonathan Cape in 1981.

== Background ==
In this novel, set in the years 1952 to 1958, Paton drew from his years working as a political activist against apartheid. He also based it on his time as the president of the Liberal Party of South Africa. In the foreword, Paton says that the book contains both real (historic) and fictitious characters.

Two persons he references were still living at the time of his writing: Helen Joseph and Archbishop Trevor Huddleston. Each gave permission to Paton to introduce them, without requiring to see his text.

He noted that other real persons, who had died by the time of publication, were Albert Lutuli, Dr. Monty Naicker, Patrick Duncan, Advocate Donald Barkly Molteno, and Archbishop Geoffrey Clayton.

== Plot summary ==
The novel has multiple storylines that alternate with one another. They are related to the experiences of Paton and associates in resisting National Party rule in South Africa during the 1950s.

Prem Bodasingh is an Indian South African and a bright and talented high school student in Durban. She risks her future by her involvement in the Defiance Campaign by sitting in an area of the public library reserves for whites. She becomes romantically involved with Hugh Mainwaring, a young white student leader who joins the Defiance Campaign. Both risk prosecution under the Immorality Act forbidding interracial relationships.

Robert Mansfield is a handsome and revered former Springboks rugby player and now a popular headmaster. He took his students to play cricket against black African students at a local school. However, the Ministry of Education later decided that racially mixed school functions should be forbidden. In disagreement with the issue, Mansfield resigns from his position at the school to follow his conscience and join the Liberal Party. Angered by what they perceive as his betrayal, he begins to receive disturbing letters and death threats from right wing fringe groups and individuals.

Lodewyk Prinsloo, a respected white railway clerk sees his life disintegrate when the South African police inform him that he is Coloured. He loses his livelihood and his family as the news reverberates.

The novel is divided into six parts:

Part One: The Defiance Campaign Part Two: The Cleft Stick Part Three: Come Back, Africa Part Four: Death of a Traitor Part Five: The Holy Church of Zion Part Six: Into the Golden Age

== Reception ==
Nadine Gordimer reviewed the novel for The New Republic: "One cannot read this book without the total absorption of its truth and admiration for the artistic truth into which that has been transposed...This one is achieved with shining intelligence and acerbity, a young man's book with the advantage of an old man's experience of the battle with life and words."
