= Lost in the Stars (1949 musical) =

1949 musical

- Music: Kurt Weill
- Lyrics: Maxwell Anderson
- Book: Maxwell Anderson
- Basis: Cry, the Beloved Country by Alan Paton
- Premiere: October 30, 1949: Broadway theatre

Lost in the Stars is a 1949-premiered musical with book and lyrics by Maxwell Anderson and music by Kurt Weill, based on the novel Cry, the Beloved Country (1948) by Alan Paton. The musical premiered on Broadway in 1949; it was the composer's last work for the stage before he died the following year.

== Plot ==
In August 1949, in the South African village of Ndotsheni (The song "The Hills of Ixopo" is sung at this point.), the black Anglican priest of St. Mark's Church, the Rev. Stephen Kumalo, learns from a letter from his brother (John Kumalo, who lives in Johannesburg) that their sister is in trouble. Stephen decides to travel to Johannesburg to help his sister; he will also seek his son, Absalom, who works in the mines ("Thousands of Miles"). In Johannesburg, Stephen learns that his sister will not leave but she asks him to take care of her young son, Alex.

He finally locates his son Absalom, who had been in jail. Absalom now plans with his friends to steal, so they can get enough money to avoid a life in the gold mines. Absalom's pregnant girlfriend Irina tries to convince him not to take part, but he goes ahead with his plan ("Trouble Man"). During the robbery, Absalom kills Arthur Jarvis, a white friend of his father, Stephen. As Absalom is jailed, Stephen wonders how to tell his wife, Grace, and he realizes he is facing a crisis of faith ("Lost in the Stars").

Stephen knows that his son could either tell a lie and live or tell the truth and die. He prays for guidance ("O Tixo, Tixo, Help Me"). At the trial, Absalom's two friends lie to the court and are freed, but Absalom, truly repentant, tells the truth and is sentenced to hang ("Cry, the Beloved Country"). Stephen performs a wedding between Absalom and Irina in prison and then returns home to Ndotsheni with Irina and Alex. Alex and the child of Arthur Jarvis meet and start to become friends ("Big Mole"). Stephen tells his flock he can no longer be their minister, and their faith is now also shaken ("A Bird of Passage").

On the still-dark morning of the execution, Stephen waits alone for the clock to strike ("Four O'Clock"). Unexpectedly, the father of the murdered man pays him a visit. He tells Stephen that he has realized that they have both lost sons. Out of recognition of their mutual sorrow, and despite their different races, he offers his friendship, and Stephen accepts.

== Song list ==
=== Act I ===
- "The Hills of Ixopo" – Leader and Singers
- "Thousands of Miles" – Stephen Kumalo
- "Train to Johannesburg" – Leader and Singers
- "The Search" – Stephen Kumalo, Leader and Singers
- "The Little Gray House" – Stephen Kumalo and Singers
- "Who'll Buy?" – Linda
- "Trouble Man" – Irina
- "Murder in Parkwold" – Singers
- "Fear!" – Singers
- "Lost in the Stars" – Stephen Kumalo and Singers

=== Act II ===
- "The Wild Justice" – Leader and Singers
- "O Tixo, Tixo, Help Me!" – Stephen Kumalo
- "Stay Well" – Irina
- "Cry, the Beloved Country" – Leader and Singers
- "Big Mole" – Alex
- "A Bird of Passage" – Villager and Singers
- "Four O'Clock" – Singers

== Roles and original cast ==
- Leader (tenor or high baritone) – Frank Roane
- Stephen Kumalo (baritone) – Todd Duncan
- Absalom Kumalo – Julian Mayfield
- John Kumalo - Warren Coleman
- Grace Kumalo – Gertrude Jeanette
- James Jarvis – Leslie Banks
- Linda (singer-dancer) – Sheila Guyse
- Irina (mezzo-soprano) – Inez Matthews
- Alex (boy soprano) – Herbert Coleman

== Musical analysis ==
Several of the songs, including the title song, had been reworked from an earlier, abortive Weill/Anderson play Ulysses Africanus. The title song had originally been written circa 1938 for that other play in African-American dialect, but had already been reworked to standard English by the time Weill's wife Lotte Lenya became the first to record the song in 1943.

Weill wanted to use neither the "tom-tom" beat with which Americans were familiar nor the spirituals of the South, so he obtained recordings of Zulu music from Africa to study. In an interview with The New York Times however, Weill noted that "American spirituals are closer to African music than many people realize." In pointing out the set, he commented "Notice that this is an Anglican church. That is another influence that appears in the music. In general, the whole play has a Biblical tone that we hope the public will like."

He was influenced by African American musical idioms through his use of spiritual melodies, blues and jazz.

The title song "Lost in the Stars" enjoyed a measure of popular success, and versions of it were recorded by Anita O'Day, Frank Sinatra, Tony Bennett, Sarah Vaughan, Elvis Costello, Leonard Nimoy, William Shatner, Kurt Elling, Martin Gore and many others. The words, which in the musical are those of the minister Stephen Kumalo at the depth of his desperation, tell how God once "held all the stars in the palm of his hand... and they ran through his fingers like grains of sand, and one little star fell alone."

Kumalo says that God sought and found the little lost star and "stated and promised he'd take special care so it wouldn't get lost again." However, at times, he thinks that God has forgotten his promise and that "we're lost out here in the stars."

== Production and critics ==
Lost in the Stars opened on Broadway at the Music Box Theatre on October 30, 1949, and closed on July 1, 1950, after 281 performances. The production was supervised and directed by Rouben Mamoulian and choreographed by La Verne French. Mamoulian was such a strong influence on the production that Foster Hirsch calls him "the show's third author." Todd Duncan took the role of Stephen; Inez Matthews sang Irina.

Critic Brooks Atkinson, in his review for The New York Times wrote of the original 1949 Broadway production that Maxwell Anderson and Mr. Weill had encountered "obvious difficulty" in transforming "so thoroughly a work of literary art" into theatre, and was sometimes "skimming and literal where the novel is rich and allusive." He suggested that people unfamiliar with the novel might not fully appreciate the "multitudinous forces that are running headlong through this tragic story." He praised Anderson's "taste and integrity" and described the last scene as "profoundly moving." Robert Garland, writing in the Journal American, similarly commented that "the beauty and simplicity of Paton's book infrequently comes through."

In contrast, Atkinson felt that the music positively added to the experience of the novel: "Here, the theatre has come bearing its most memorable gifts. In the past Mr. Weill has given the theatre some fine scores. But...it is difficult to remember anything out of his portfolio as eloquent as this richly orchestrated singing music....[It is] overflowing with the same compassion that Mr. Paton brought to his novel...The music is deep, dramatic, and beautiful."

However, Paton did not agree with Anderson's ending. Paton desperately wanted the Christian aspect of his work to be a huge focus. Without it, it changed the meaning of the entire work. About Lost in the Stars, Paton thought that the opening lines were "profoundly unchristian and tantamount to an invitation to despair, and therefore they [were] an expression of something directly opposed to what Paton intended his character to embody."

== Later productions and adaptations ==
New York City Opera presented the musical in April 1958. Directed by Jose Quintero, the cast featured Lawrence Winters (Stephen Kumalo) and Lee Charles (Leader). (The conductor of those performances, Julius Rudel, led a 1992 complete recording of the score with the Orchestra of St. Luke's: Music Masters 01612-67100.)

A Broadway revival opened at the Imperial Theatre on April 18, 1972, and closed on May 20 after 39 performances and 8 previews. Directed by Gene Frankel with choreography by Louis Johnson, the cast featured Rod Perry as Leader, Brock Peters as Stephen Kumalo, Leslie Banks as James Jarvis, and Rosetta LeNoire as Grace Kumalo. Peters was nominated for the Tony Award Best Actor in a Musical and the Drama Desk Award Outstanding Performance; Gilbert Price was nominated for the Tony Award Best Featured Actor in a Musical.

Lost in the Stars was adapted for the screen in 1974, with Daniel Mann directing. The movie was released in the American Film Theatre series. Reviews were mixed.

Long Wharf Theatre, New Haven, Connecticut, presented a revival in April 1986, directed by Arvin Brown.

The York Theatre Company, New York City, New York, presented a revival that ran from March 25 - April 17, 1988, directed by Alex Dmitriev. Howard Kissel of the Daily News wrote: "The York Theatre Company has provided an enormous service by reviving Kurt Weill's 'Lost In The Stars.' When you hear music of this power, questions about whether or not it's 'opera' are irrelevant....You know you're in the presence of something great from the minute the show starts...." This production received a Drama Desk Nomination for Best Musical Revival. Musical Direction was by Lawrence W. Hill. In the cast were George Merritt as Stephen Kumalo, Ken Prymus as Leader, April Armstrong as Irini, and as an interesting note, Rachel Lemanski (aka Rachel York) in the ensemble. Costumes by Holly Hynes, set by James Morgan and lighting by Mary Jo Dondlinger.

A semi-staged concert was presented by the New York City Center Encores! series from February 3 to February 6, 2011. New Sussex Opera gave the British staged premiere at the Gardner Arts Centre, University of Sussex in 1991. The Glimmerglass Festival, in Cooperstown, New York State, presented the Lost in the Stars starring Eric Owens, Wynn Harmon, and Sean Panikkar in a co-production with Cape Town Opera, South Africa, between 22 July and 25 August 2012.
