= Sean Panikkar =

American operatic tenor (born 1981)

Sean Panikkar (born 17 September 1981) is an American operatic tenor. He has performed in many leading opera houses both nationally and internationally, including the Metropolitan Opera, Teatro alla Scala, Carnegie Hall, Salzburg Festival, as well as Opera Theatre of Saint Louis, Fort Worth Opera,

== Early years ==
Sean Panikkar was born and raised in Bloomsburg, Pennsylvania, the second son of Sri Lankan immigrants—a father of Sinhalese and Indian ancestry and a Tamil mother. Panikkar first began studying voice as a high schooler with Juilliard-trained soprano Li Ping Liu. At the University of Michigan he double majored in civil engineering and vocal performance for three years before committing himself entirely to music. At the School of Music, Theatre & Dance there he studied with Daniel Washington and Luretta Bybee and received his bachelor's and master's degrees in vocal performance. He participated in the Merola training program of the San Francisco Opera in 2004 and held an Adler Fellow with that company in 2005 and 2006.

== Career ==
Panikkar has performed several roles with Metropolitan Opera, including Tybalt in Roméo et Juliette under the baton of Plácido Domingo, Arturo in Lucia di Lammermoor conducted by Marco Armiliato, Brighella in Ariadne auf Naxos led by Kirill Petrenko, and Prunier in La rondine. Further credits include roles in The Queen of Spades, Le pauvre matelot, The Maid of Orleans, Manon Lescaut, Tristan und Isolde, Fidelio, Norma, and Die Zauberflöte with the San Francisco Opera, as well as Nabucco at Washington National Opera, the male title role of Béatrice et Bénédict with Opera Boston, Weill's Lost in the Stars at the Glimmerglass Festival, Salome at Washington National Opera and the Saito Kinen Festival, and Lensky in Eugene Onegin and Count Almaviva in The Ghosts of Versailles with the Opera Theatre of Saint Louis.

During the 2013/14 season, Panikkar sang Rodolfo in La bohème at the Royal Albert Hall in London, Macduff in Macbeth at Palm Beach Opera, and return engagements with Pittsburgh Opera as Tamino in The Magic Flute and with Fort Worth Opera as Nadir in Les pêcheurs de perles. In the 2014/15 season, he sang in The Death of Klinghoffer at the Metropolitan Opera and in the world premiere of Giorgio Battistelli's CO2 at Teatro alla Scala.

In 2013, Panikkar was recruited on short notice to join the classical crossover trio FORTE during season eight of America's Got Talent. Panikkar has released two albums as a member of FORTE: their self-titled debut in 2013, and The Future Classics in 2016.

In March 2018 Panikkar sang the role of Greenhorn in Jake Heggie's Moby-Dick at the Pittsburgh Opera. He then joined the Salzburg Festival in performances of The Bassarids. He was named "Artist of the Week" by Opernwelt prior to the anticipated Salzburg Festival debut. He also plays the lead role of Gandhi in Philip Glass's opera Satyagraha. Of his experience in that role he said:

As the first brown person to sing Gandhi, it brought an extra level of emotion to some of the oppressive scenes that doesn’t necessarily come across quite as powerfully when a white singer is doing it.

Panikkar began 2019 with a four-night run of the reunited AGT finalist lineup of FORTE at the Sharon L. Morse Performing Arts Center in The Villages, Florida. He then visited his family's homeland of Sri Lanka for the first time to present song recitals with soprano Tharanga Goonatilleke and pianist Rohan De Silva. Panikkar began May with the performance of Nadir in Bizet's The Pearl Fishers at Kansas City Lyric Opera.

In summer 2019, Panikkar starred in The Rise and Fall of the City of Mahagonny at the Festival d’Aix-En-Provence. In the fall at the Komische Oper Berlin he reprised the role of Dionysus in The Bassarids. In January 2020 he sang the role of José in Bizet's Carmen at the English National Opera.

Although the COVID-19 pandemic forced the cancellation of many of his engagements, in October 2020 at Michigan Opera Theater in Detroit he sang the role of Siegfried in an abridged version of Wagner's Götterdämmerung, a radical reinterpretation of that opera set in a parking garage and viewed by audience members driving through in cars.

On November 22, 2022, he sang the role of Leonard Woolf in the stage premiere of Kevin Puts's opera The Hours at the Metropolitan Opera. The performance of December 10 was video-cast as part of the Metropolitan Opera Live in HD series.

Panikkar has been honored by the George London Foundation with the 2007 Robert Jacobson Memorial Award and a 2009 George London Award; he was a First Prize winner of the 2010 Gerda Lissner International Vocal Competition, and second-place winner in the 2009 International Hans Gabor Belvedere Singing Competition.

== Discography ==
- Shalimar the Clown, with the Opera Theatre of Saint Louis, tenor soloist
- Stravinsky's Perséphone, with the American Symphony Orchestra, tenor soloist
- Mozart's Zaide (DVD) as Gomatz, directed by Peter Sellars, Medici Arts
- Puccini's Manon Lescaut (DVD with the Metropolitan Opera), as Edmondo, EMI Classics
- William Bolcom, Songs of Innocence and of Experience, soloist
- The Armed Man: A Concert for Peace (DVD) Rackham Symphony Choir and Orchestra, tenor soloist
- Hans Werner Henze, The Bassarids, as Dionysus, with the Vienna Philharmonic, Kent Nagano, conductor; Salzburg Festival, 2018

As a member of FORTE

- FORTE (2013)
- The Future Classics (2016)
