= The Serenad3 =

Operatic pop trio

- Genres: Classical crossover; operatic pop
- Years active: 2020–present
- Members: Fernando Varela; Craig Irvin; Devin Eatmon
- Website: theserenad3.com

The Serenad3 is a classical crossover–operatic pop trio consisting of Classical Crossover artist Fernando Varela, operatic baritone Craig Irvin, and operatic tenor Devin Eatmon.

== History ==
=== Formation ===
Varela joined with Craig Irvin and Devin Eatmon to form The Serenad3, releasing their debut album (EP) Christmas Serenade in late November 2020. The featured single on the album is Silent Night, a collaboration with David Foster, who arranged the song, and accompanied the trio on piano, and featured vocals by Gloria Estefan. David Foster said of the album, that it's "A spectacular Christmas album. Every song, a masterpiece. It's a magical musical journey." The trio appeared as "The Christmas Tenors" to wrap up the Open Air Concert Series put on by Varela's Victory Productions at The Villages Polo Fields. They also were featured in the Dr. Phillips Center for the Performing Arts Front Yard Festival, also an open air series on the grounds of the Orlando Dr. Phillips Center.

In March 2020, the group was signed by L2 Artists, a management agency which focuses on opera and symphonic musical artists.

== Discography ==
=== Singles ===
- "Silent Night" (2020)

=== Albums ===
- Christmas Serenade (Nov, 2020) as EP, Full release in 2021
- Romantic Serenade (Feb, 2021) as EP

== See also ==
- Fernando Varela
- Craig Irvin
- Devin Eatmon
