= James Berardinelli =

American film critic (born 1967)

- Born: September 25, 1967 (age 59); New Brunswick, New Jersey, U.S.
- Education: University of Pennsylvania (BS, MS)
- Occupation: Writer
- Spouse: Sheryl (m. 2004)
- Children: 2
- Writing career
- Period: 1992–present
- Genre: Fantasy
- Subject: Film
- Website: reelviews.net

James Berardinelli (born September 25, 1967) is an American film critic. His reviews are mainly published on his blog ReelViews. Approved as a critic by the aggregator Rotten Tomatoes, he has published two collections of reviews of movies on DVD and video. He is also a fantasy novelist, publishing a trilogy from 2015 through 2016 known as The Last Whisper of the Gods.

== Personal life ==
Berardinelli, who is of Italian heritage, was born in New Brunswick, New Jersey and spent his early childhood in Morristown, New Jersey. When he was nine, his family moved to the township of Cherry Hill, New Jersey, where he attended Cherry Hill High School East. Later he moved to Piscataway.

He attended the University of Pennsylvania from 1985 to 1990, obtaining both a bachelor's and master's degree in electrical engineering. After graduating he worked for Bellcore Company, now Telcordia Technologies. He worked during the next 15 years "in a variety of fields, including fiber optics, video testing, and software systems."

Berardinelli has categorized himself as an agnostic and a libertarian. He resides in Mount Laurel, New Jersey, with his wife, Sheryl, whom he met through his website. They have two children: a son born in May 2010, and a daughter born in November 2019.

== Career ==
Starting in January 1992, Berardinelli began writing movie reviews, his first being a review of the 1991 drama Grand Canyon. His first review published to the Internet was of the 1992 drama Scent of a Woman, which was posted both to Usenet and his Colossus Inc-hosted website, ReelViews.

Roger Ebert referred to Berardinelli as "the best of the Web-based critics" in 2001, and wrote a foreword for the 2003 book, Reelviews, a collection of Berardinelli's reviews. Berardinelli is a member of the Broadcast Film Critics Association and is a Rotten Tomatoes-approved critic.

In January 2004, he began his blog ReelThoughts, by which time his reviews could attract as many as 100,000 readers, up from around 1,400 weekly readers in 1997. In August 2006, the site moved to ReelViews.net, a domain Berardinelli had originally registered by late 2000.

In November 2015, Berardinelli published the first book in a fantasy novel trilogy entitled The Last Whisper of the Gods. The second book followed in January 2016, the third in March 2016.

Berardinelli appears as a guest on the pop-culture radio program Fictional Frontiers every two weeks.

== Annual film rankings ==
- 1993: Schindler's List
- 1994: Pulp Fiction
- 1995: Cry, The Beloved Country
- 1996: Hamlet
- 1997: The Sweet Hereafter
- 1998: Saving Private Ryan
- 1999: The War Zone
- Best of 1990s : Schindler's List
- 2000: Requiem for a Dream
- 2001: Memento
- 2002: Minority Report
- 2003: The Lord of the Rings: The Return of the King
- 2004: Maria Full of Grace
- 2005: Munich
- 2006: The Departed
- 2007: The Lives of Others
- 2008: The Dark Knight
- 2009: Avatar
- Best of 2000s: The Lord of the Rings
- 2010: The King's Speech
- 2011: The Girl with the Dragon Tattoo
- 2012: Looper
- 2013: Before Midnight
- 2014: Interstellar
- 2015: The Hateful Eight
- 2016: Arrival
- 2017: Three Billboards Outside Ebbing, Missouri
- 2018: Shoplifters
- 2019: Once Upon a Time in Hollywood
- Best of 2010s: Before Midnight
- 2020: Tenet
- 2021: The Father
- 2022: Avatar: The Way of Water
- 2023: Past Lives
- 2024: The Outrun

== Bibliography ==
- Berardinelli, James (2003) ReelViews : The Ultimate Guide to the Best 1,000 Modern Movies on DVD and Video, ISBN 1-932112-06-5
- Berardinelli, James (2005) ReelViews 2: The Ultimate Guide to the Best 1,000 Modern Movies on DVD and Video, 2005 Edition, ISBN 1-932112-40-5
- Berardinelli, James (2015) The Last Whisper of the Gods, ASIN B-016IWS-UN-M
- Berardinelli, James (2016) The Curse of the Gift, ASIN B-019CPR-EH-K
- Berardinelli, James (2016) The Shadow of the Otherverse, ASIN B-01BRSW-VH-S
- Berardinelli, James (2017) The Lingering Haze, ISBN 1-520762-02-X
