= Devin Eatmon =

American operatic tenor

Devin Eatmon is an American operatic tenor, and winner of a Harold S. Schwartz Music Scholarship. Eatmon grew up in The Villages, Florida, and sang with The Opera Club of the Villages and the Central Florida Lyric Opera. His summer performances included Opera in the Ozarks (2015) and Aspen Music Festival (2018 and 2019). He studied vocal performance at Florida State University, where he completed his bachelor's and master's degrees, and acted as a graduate teaching assistant. Selected as one of Opera Colorado's 2020-21 Artists in Residence, he will be performing several productions, once the season (delayed by COVID-19) is underway.

== Career ==
Eatmon has appeared often with The Central Florida Lyric Opera, to include solos in a number of performances, and a number of full operas to include La Traviata. While at Florida State University, he had a number of local appearances in the Tallahassee area. He has been selected as one of the 2020 Apprentice Singers by Santa Fe Opera He has also appeared in a number of concerts put on by Fernando Varela's Victory Productions, including as part of the group Four Divo.

In 2020, Eatmon joined Tenor Fernando Varela and Baritone Craig Irvin to form The Serenad3. Their first album, Christmas Serenade was released as an EP in late November. The trio appeared as "The Christmas Tenors" to wrap up the Open Air Concert Series put on by Varela's Victory Productions at The Villages Polo Fields. They also were featured in the Dr. Phillips Center for the Performing Arts Front Yard Festival, also an open air series on the grounds of the Orlando Dr. Phillips Center.

In August 2026, Eatmon has won the First Prize of the 10th Wagner Singers' Competition in Bayreuth. He is the first tenor that won the first prize.

In October 2026, he sang excerpts as Loge, Siegmund and Siegfried in a 150 minutes version of the "Ring 2.0" at Richard Meier's Stadthaus in Ulm. The stories between the excerpts were told, commented and explained by Harald Schmidt, Germany's David Letterman.

== Discography ==
- Silent Night - (with The Serenad3, David Foster, Gloria Estefan) single, Released November 23, 2020
- Christmas Serenade - (with The Serenad3), Released November 24, 2020
- Romantic Serenade (with The Serenad3), Released Feb 12, 2021

== See also ==
- The Serenad3
