= Talloires =

Commune in Haute-Savoie, France

Talloires Talouères (Arpitan)
- Part of Talloires-Montmin
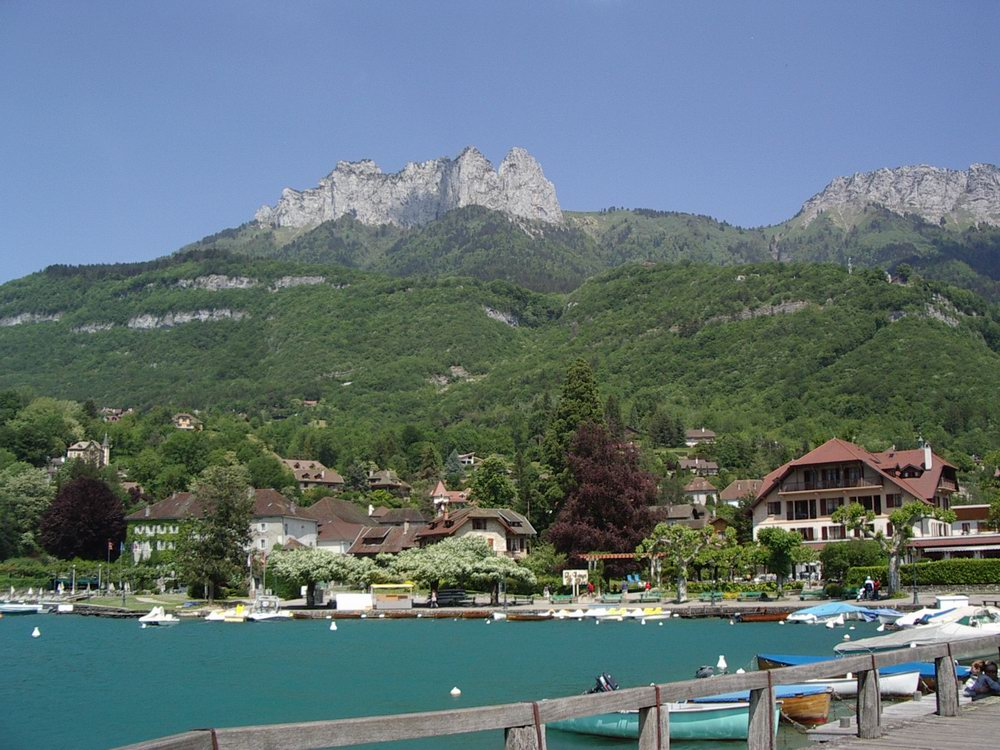
- Lake Annecy

- Coat of arms
- Location of Talloires
- Location within France Location within Auvergne-Rhône-Alpes
- Coordinates: 45°50′28″N 6°12′52″E
- Country: France
- Region: Auvergne-Rhône-Alpes
- Department: Haute-Savoie
- Arrondissement: Annecy
- Canton: Faverges
- Commune: Talloires-Montmin
- Area^{1}: 20.69 km^{2} (7.99 sq mi)
- Elevation: 447 m (1,467 ft)
- Highest elevation: 2,320 m (7,610 ft)
- Lowest elevation: 440 m (1,440 ft)
- Population (2022): 1,593
  - Density: 76.99/km^{2} (199.4/sq mi)
- Time zone: UTC+01:00 (CET)
  - Summer (DST): UTC+02:00 (CEST)
- Postal code: 74290
- ^{1} French Land Register data, which excludes lakes, ponds, glaciers > 1 km^{2} (0.386 sq mi or 247 acres) and river estuaries.

Talloires (French pronunciation: [talwaʁ]; Arpitan: Talouères) is a former commune in the Haute-Savoie department in the Auvergne-Rhône-Alpes region in south-eastern France. On 1 January 2016, it was merged into the new commune of Talloires-Montmin. Due to its setting on Lake Annecy Talloires has become a popular resort town, not only since it has been rediscovered by a privileged society of artists and writers but also since the start of the 20th century when the place became a destination.

== Geography ==
Talloires is located south of Geneva, Switzerland, on Lake Annecy and 13 km (8.1 mi) south of the local prefecture in Annecy, about 50 km (31 mi) from Switzerland and about 90 km (56 mi) from Italy. The town is situated in the French Alps, along a bay on the east side of the lake.

== History ==
The area of Talloires has been settled since Neolithic times. In Roman times, Talloires was a stage on the consular road leading from Milan to Strasbourg; the town is however mentioned for the first time in the 9th century AD. In 1016, an abbey was founded here by King Rudolph III of Burgundy and monks from Savigny Abbey and Lyon. The now standing structures of the abbey were built in 1681. The famous chemist Claude Louis Berthollet was born in Talloires, then part of the Duchy of Savoy, in 1749.

== Tourism ==
Talloires' mountainous landscapes and picturesque setting on Lake Annecy, medieval architecture, character, and summer and winter sports and activities, have created a small tourist industry in the village.

The summer activities in and around the Lake Annecy include sports (golf, water skiing, sailing, trekking in the surrounding Alps, tennis, canyoning, paragliding, horse back riding) and events (the annual Fête du Lac and Pyro Concerts). The area has hosted stages of the Tour de France several times, including a time trial stage around the lake. Talloires is close to ski resorts Megève, Espace Diamant, and La Clusaz.

The village of Talloires is 13 km (8.1 mi) away from Annecy, a city and major tourist destination. Annecy is three and a half hours from Paris on the TGV high-speed trains. Geneva International Airport is 50 minutes away on the A43 highway.

The primary business of the town is tourism, although it is still a complete community in its own right, with a central church, post office, bank, library, and a small general store.

== Conferences and education ==
Several international conferences have been conducted in Talloires, especially within the sustainable development and educational communities. The town was the birthplace of "The Talloires Declaration: University presidents for a Sustainable Future," an influential declaration on actions required by university leaders to reverse "environmental pollution and degradation, and the depletion of natural resources." Several conferences of the Weatherhead Center for International Affairs at Harvard University have been held in Talloires.

Talloires was also the site of a September 2005 conference on university civic engagement. This conference of 29 university presidents produced the Talloires Declaration on the Civic Roles and Social Responsibilities of Higher Education, which calls upon the university to "use the processes of education and research to respond to, serve and strengthen its communities for local and global citizenship." The declaration established the Talloires Network, an association of universities committed to advancing the principles of the declaration. As of July 2012, 247 universities have signed the declaration and have become members of the Talloires Network.

Tufts University maintains its European Center in the local 11th-century (former) Benedictine priory. The priory serves as a conference center and campus for visiting college students.

== Images ==
Views of Talloires

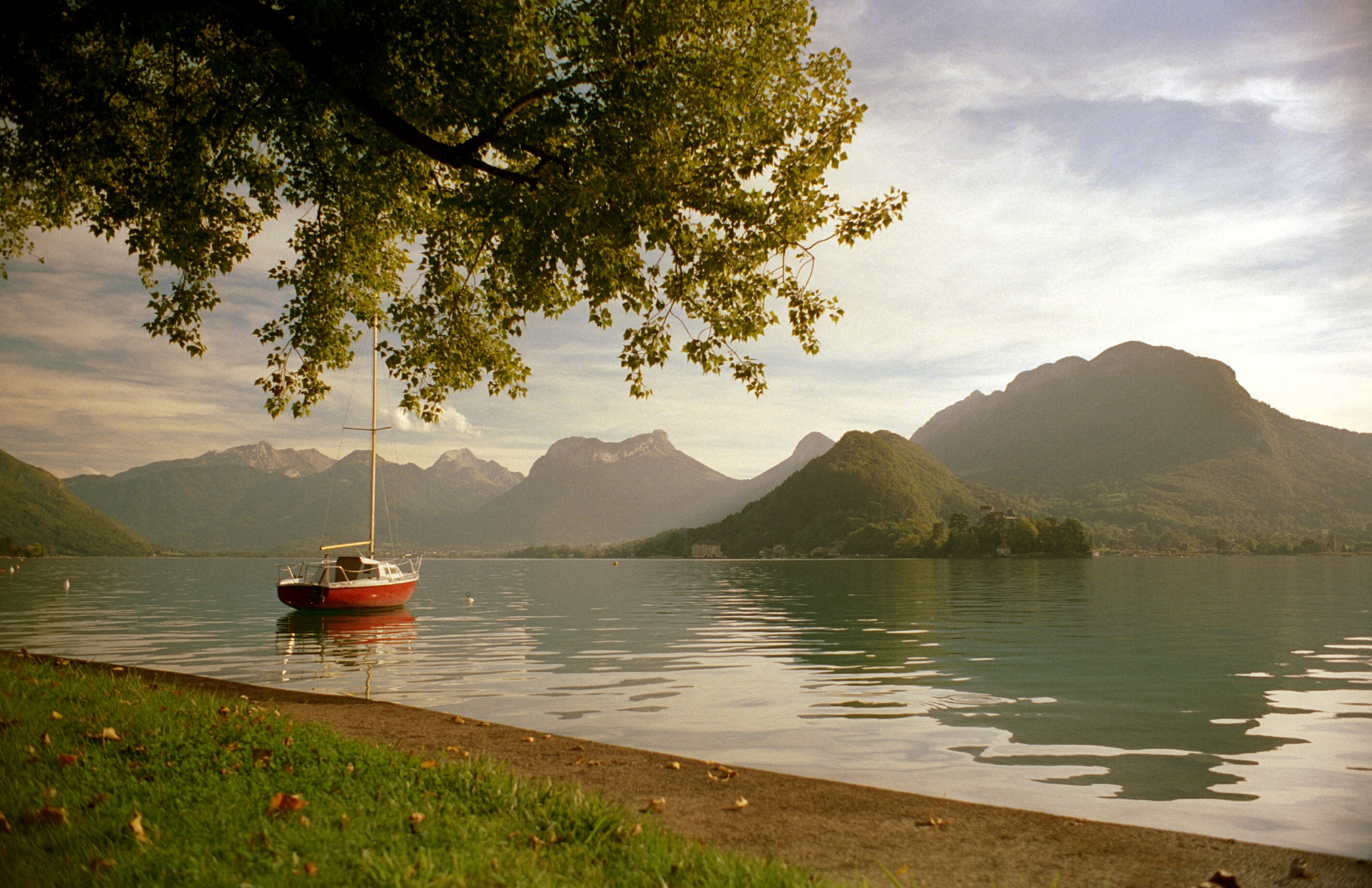
View of Lake Annecy from Talloires

The Tufts European Center on the Talloires campus

== See also ==
- Communes of the Haute-Savoie department
