= Kontakion For You Departed =

1969 book by Alan Paton

First edition (publ. Jonathan Cape)

Kontakion for You Departed is a book by Alan Paton dedicated to his wife Dorrie Francis Lusted. The book was published in 1969, two years after her death from emphysema in 1967.
