= Journey Continued =

Autobiography by Alan Paton

- Author: Alan Paton
- Genre: Autobiography
- Publication date: 1988
- ISBN: 978-0-19-219237-0

Journey Continued: An Autobiography is the second part of South African writer Alan Paton's autobiography. The first book was Towards the Mountain. In his Journey, he wrote about his life after the publication of his debut novel, Cry the Beloved Country (1948), which was so influential.

Paton had completed the writing and correction of this book, but he died in 1988, before it was published later that year.

== Topics ==
The book addresses a wide variety of topics, personal, professional, philosophical, and political. For example, it discusses the way in which Paton's Cry, The Beloved Country was adapted for Broadway theatre. It also discusses the Christian basis for Paton's activism.

Journey Continued outlines Paton's long and deep involvement with the Liberal Party of South Africa. He explores his views on liberalism and its distinction from other political philosophies.

== Quotations ==
"Between communists and liberals ... there is a fundamental incompatibility. ... A liberal cannot accept that the use of any means is justifiable if the end is good; a communist can. A liberal shrinks from the idea of a centrally controlled society, and a centrally controlled economy; a communist does not. The liberal belief in the separation of powers is not acceptable to communists. A liberal believes that a centrally controlled economy kills private initiative and drive, and leads to a drab and dreary existence. A liberal believes in the rule of law, the communist believes in the rule of the party."

— Alan Paton, Journey Continued
