= Wynn Harmon =

- Born: 7 November 1960 (age 66); Upper St. Clair Township, Pennsylvania, U.S.
- Education: Boston University (BFA); American Conservatory Theater (MFA)
- Occupation: Actor

Wynn Harmon (born in Upper St. Clair Township, Pennsylvania), is an American stage and television actor.

== Credits ==
=== Broadway ===
On Broadway he played The Detective in Porgy and Bess (also telecast Live from Lincoln Center on PBS).

=== Off Broadway ===
Off-Broadway credits include:

- As You Like It
- The premiere of Tibet Does Not Exist

=== Regional ===
Regional credits include:

- Lost in the Stars at Washington National Opera, Kennedy Center Washington DC
- Show Boat at Washington National Opera, Kennedy Center Washington DC
- Camelot at Glimmerglass Festival
- Carousel at Glimmerglass Festival
- Ariadne in Naxos at Glimmerglass Festival
- Lost in the Stars at Glimmerglass Festival
- The Music Man at Glimmerglass Festival and Royal Opera House of Muscat, Oman
- Hamlet at Shakespeare on the Sound
- The Hound of the Baskervilles at New Jersey Repertory Theatre
- The Habit of Art at The Studio Theatre Washington DC
- The Alchemist, Love's Labor's Lost at The Shakespeare Theatre, Washington DC
- Hamlet at Pioneer Theatre Company, Salt Lake City, Utah
- Cymbeline, Romeo and Juliet, A Midsummer Night's Dream, Pride and Prejudice at Orlando Shakespeare Festival
- The 39 Steps at The Depot Theatre, Westport, New York
- God of Carnage at Hartford TheatreWorks
- The Heidi Chronicles at Arena Stage
- A Moon for the Misbegotten at Long Wharf Theatre, Hartford Stage and The Alley Theatre
- The Constant Wife, Pericles, Macbeth, The Comedy of Errors, The Winter's Tale, Othello, A Midsummer Night's Dream, Titus Andronicus, Romeo and Juliet, Merry Wives of Windsor, All's Well That Ends Well at The Old Globe Theatre
- Sylvia and Travels with My Aunt at Virginia Stage and Syracuse Stage;
- The Way of the World at Huntington Theatre Company;
- The West End Horror and A Christmas Carol at Bay Street Theatre;
- Me and My Girl at Candlewood Playhouse
- Scrooge in A Christmas Carol at the Westport Country Playhouse;
- 1776, Anything Goes, Moon Over Buffalo, Noises Off, Murderers and Scotland Road at Riverside Theatre in Vero Beach
- Time of My Life, Balmoral, Tartuffe, The Mousetrap and Moon Over Buffalo at Depot Theatre
- Much Ado About Nothing; Romeo and Juliet at Hudson Valley Shakespeare Festival
- Our Town at Two River Theatre.
- Private Lives at Palm Beach Dramaworks

=== Television ===
- Trevor Babcock on All My Children
- Mark in the film Paper Cranes
