= Craig Irvin =

American operatic baritone

- Born: Craig Irvin
- Years active: 2006–present
- Website: irvinbaritone.com

Craig Irvin is an American operatic baritone. Irvin did his undergraduate study at the Simpson College, in Indianola Iowa, before completing his graduate work at The University of Tennessee. During his graduate studies, he performed with the Knoxville Opera as Basilio in Il Barbiere di Siviglia and as a soloist in Verdi's Requiem with the Elmhurst Symphony Orchestra. He has performed in many leading opera houses both nationally and internationally, including premiering the role of Lieutenant Horstmayer in Kevin Puts and Minnesota Opera's acclaimed and Pulitzer Prize winning Silent Night “I’ve had the new-opera experience that no one gets” Irvin is quoted to say by Opera News, in singing the same role multiple times.

== Career ==
Irvin began his career at Orlando Opera in the 2006 season, and continued the following season as a main stage artist. While in Orlando, Irvin also performed the role of Gaston in Beauty and the Beast at Walt Disney World, completing over 700 performances. “I got to be onstage, in front of thousands of people, five days a week, for almost two years,” Irvin says. “And that is not an experience you get - in America - as an opera singer!”

Irvin spent 2008 in residence with Lyric Opera of Chicago's Ryan Opera Center. He returned for a second season in 2009–2010. While there he portrayed a number of roles including Zuniga in Carmen, Theseus in A Midsummer Night's Dream, the Imperial Commissioner in Madama Butterfly, the title role in The Mikado, and Bartolo in Le Nozze Di Figaro, among others.

In 2011, Irvin performed as Lieutenant Horstmayer in the premier of Kevin Puts’ Silent Night at Minnesota Opera. Having said of Silent Night, “It’s the most amazing opera I have ever had a chance to work on.” Irvin describes why he feels that way, citing, “There’s a major battle scene about five minutes into the show that is extremely visceral, both for the action and the music,” He continues, “Ten minutes later, there’s some of the most beautiful music and orchestration I’ve ever heard. You can visualize, just through the music, the sun breaking the crest of the horizon, and the frost on the grass start to melt away, and birds taking off. But it ends darkly, because as the sun comes out, you see all the dead bodies.”

In the 2012–2013 season, Irvin sang in Carmina Burana with the Phoenix Symphony, and debuted at Opera Saratoga as Dick Deadeye in HMS Pinafore, and as Raimondo in Lucia di Lammermoor. In 2013, Irvin played Mandryka in Strauss's Arabella at the Minnesota Opera.

In early 2015 Irvin sang the Pirate King in the Pensacola Opera production of Gilbert & Sullivan's The Pirates of Penzance Also in 2015, Irvin was seen in Sarasota Opera's production of La Bohème as Marcello.

In their review of his role in Utah Opera's 2016 production of Figaro, The Salt Lake Tribune said of Irvin, “Baritone Craig Irvin was a strong foil, playing Count Almaviva as a suave bully who was redeemed by a lightning bolt of compassion at the end of the opera.” And in his role that year at LoftOpera as Macbeth, The Observer commented “As Macbeth, Craig Irvin flaunted a big, steely baritone as striking as his craggy profile.”

Irvin has reprised his premier role of Lieutenant Horstmayer a number of times since his original performance in 2011 at Minnesota Opera, including in 2012 at Opera Philadelphia. Further performances were at Fort Worth Opera and Cincinnati Opera in 2014, Atlanta Opera in 2016, 2019 at Austin Opera, and Utah Opera in 2020.

2017 found Irvin playing Excamillo in Carmen, a role of which the Texas Classical Review stated, “Though each generation finds new secrets in Carmen, Escamillo never changes: he needs a decent dynamic range, a sturdy swagger, and a beautiful, smooth vocal quality, all of which Irvin brought to the table.” Irvin was then described in his role as Dan Packard as “aptly heartless and blustering” in Dinner at Eight, “singing with a big, commanding baritone”.

In 2018 Irvin appeared twice at the Wexford Festival Opera, once as Sheriff Jack Rance in La Fanciulla Del West, of which Opera Wire said “Irvin, was very impressive. Stylishly dressed in black, his presence dominated the stage. He acted the role with such conviction that it would be impossible to doubt the malevolence of his intentions.” Continuing, they added “Irvin has a strong baritone with an interestingly colored timbre, which he successfully used to characterize Rance’s sinister nature. He sang with confidence, coated with a vocal swagger that gave him the necessary authority to convince in the role.” Also at the Wexford Festival, Irvin performed Dan Packard in Dinner at Eight.

Irvin was honored with the Heinz Rehfuss Singing Actor Award by the Orlando Opera. Irvin was also recognized with an Honorable Mention in the Fourth Annual Excellence in Opera awards by Operavore. He was featured by Barihunks for his Zurga in the 2015 production at Utah Opera of Bizet's The Pearl Fishers, and in 2017 for his role at Minnesota Opera in Dinner at Eight.

In 2020, Irvin joined Tenor Fernando Varela and Tenor Devin Eatmon to form The Serenad3. Their first album, Christmas Serenade was released as an EP in late November.

== Discography ==
- An American Baritone Vincero Enterprises (2011)
- Then Sings my Soul (2019)
- Silent Night - (with The Serenad3, David Foster, Gloria Estefan) single, Released November 23, 2020
- Christmas Serenade - (with The Serenad3), Released November 24, 2020
- Romantic Serenade (with The Serenad3), Released Feb 12, 2021

== See also ==
- The Serenad3
