= Brenda Gourley =

South African academic administrator (born 1943)

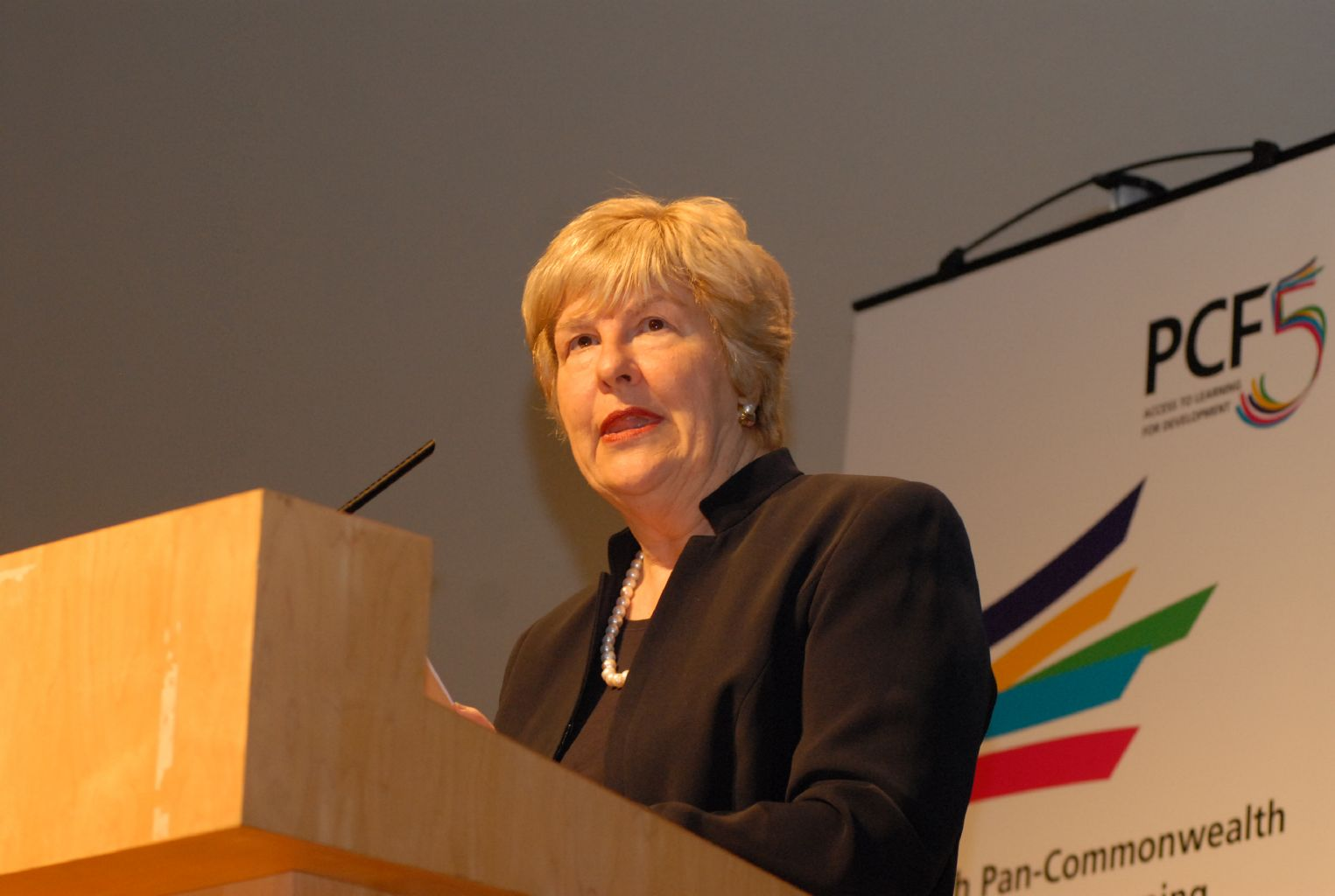
Brenda Gourley, PCF5 in London 2008

Brenda Mary Gourley (born December 1, 1943) was the Vice-Chancellor of the Open University from 2002 until 2009.

== Career ==
Gourley is a qualified Chartered Accountant and an emeritus professor of Accounting and Finance. She has served as a non-executive director on a variety of Boards and Trusts in both the public and private sectors. She was Vice-Chancellor of the University of Natal, South Africa for eight years. When appointed at Natal in 1994 she was South Africa's first female Vice-Chancellor. The Brenda M Gourley Scholarship is awarded in her honour at the University of Kwa-Zulu Natal for 'the undergraduate student ranked second in the full range of undergraduates throughout the University.'

She was appointed the fourth Vice-Chancellor of The Open University in 2002. Gourley made a special effort to inspire The Open University to engage with Africa. This involved raising substantial funds to enable them to offer their services to Africa. Gourley ensured that The Open University was the first British university to make a large selection of its educational resources freely available on the web, and she continues to champion the Open Educational Resource movement. She supports the role of Higher Education in promoting social justice and finding a sustainable way of out of poverty.

Gourley was a Founder Member of the Talloires Network of universities and educational institutions; an organisation that is aimed at strengthening the civic roles of universities and higher education. She served on the board of the International Association of Universities for eight years. She served as Chair, for two terms, of the Association of Commonwealth Universities.

Gourley was on the board of the University of Brighton from 2011 to 2015 Gourley was an independent non-executive director on the board of the South African listed company, AdvTech Ltd for 11 years until March 2021, and for 8 years, until 2019, on the Board of Trustees of the charity group, IADP, the International Association for Digital Publications, that seeks to improve the educational experience and outcome of tertiary education in developing countries. She was Chair, for two terms, of the Board of Trustees of the Council for Education in the Commonwealth, a charity that sought to improve the educational experience and outcome of tertiary education in Commonwealth countries. She was an elected Councillor on the City and Guilds of London Institute and a Trustee of The Royal Anniversary Trust which awards the biennial Queen's Anniversary Prize.

Gourley has been awarded 14 honorary doctorates from universities on four continents and, in 2014, Gourley was awarded the Outstanding Educator Award by UNISA University of South Africa which acknowledges her 'significant contribution to our society in the area of primary/pre-primary, secondary or tertiary education.'

In 2009 Gourley was named as one of the UK's most inspiring women in the Women in Public Life awards, receiving the International Public Servant of the Year and overall Outstanding Achiever awards.

== Honours and awards ==
- Honorary Degree: LLD, University of Nottingham, United Kingdom (1997)
- Honorary Degree: D.HLett, University of Richmond, United Kingdom (2004)
- Honorary Degree: D.Ed., by the University of Abertay, United Kingdom (2004)
- Honorary Degree: D.Phil., Allama Iqbal Open University, Pakistan (2007) in recognition of her eminence in the field of Distance Education and distinguished service to humanity,
- Honorary Degree: HC, Université du Québec à Montréal(2007)
- Honorary Degree: DCom, by the University of Pretoria, South Africa (2008)
- Honorary Fellowship of the Open University of Israel (2008) in recognition of her commitment to broadening access of the community to Higher Education.
- Honorary Fellowship of the Commonwealth of Learning (2008)
- Award of Individual Prize of Excellence by the International Council for Open and Distance Education (2008)
- Symon's Medal awarded by the Association of Commonwealth Universities for contribution to Higher Education in the Commonwealth (2008)
- Honorary Degree: HC, by the Open University in the Netherlands (2009)
- Fellowship of the City and Guilds of London Institute for services to Higher Education (2009)
- Award: International Public Servant of the Year Award made by Women in Public Life Initiative and Overall Outstanding Achiever of the Year Award made by same body (2009) in the United Kingdom.
- Honorary Degree: HC: by The Open University of Catalonia, Spain (2011)
- Honorary Degree: D.Phil., University of South Africa (2011) D.Phil. - in recognition of her contributions to Distance and Open Education
- Fellowship of The Open University (2011)
- Honorary Degree: D.Phil., University of Gloucestershire (2011)
- Honorary Degree: D.Ed., University of Witwatersrand (2012)
- Honorary Degree: D.Ed., University of South Africa (2013)
- UNISA Calabash Award 2014 UNISA (2014)
