= Richard Granville Baloyi =

South African politician

- Born: 1897; South Africa
- Died: 1962 (aged 64–65); Johannesburg, South Africa
- Occupations: Businessman, community leader, politician
- Organization: African National Congress (ANC)
- Known for: Alexandra Bus Owners' Association; Atlantic Charter Committee (1943)
- Title: Treasurer-General of the ANC (1937–1948)

Richard Granville Baloyi (1897–1962) was a South African entrepreneur, community leader, and politician who played a dual role as a pioneer of Black capitalism and a high-ranking official in the liberation movement. He is best remembered for serving as the Treasurer-General of the African National Congress (ANC) from 1937 to 1948 and for his leadership in the township of Alexandra, where he championed black-owned transport and property rights against colonial and early apartheid-era restrictions

== Business career and the Alexandra Bus Owners' Association ==
Baloyi was a central figure in the emergence of a Black middle class in Johannesburg. In 1927, he purchased his first buses to provide essential, affordable transport for Alexandra residents working in the city center. Shortly thereafter, he co-founded the Alexandra Bus Owners' Association, serving as its primary leader.

His business faced significant systemic challenges. By 1940, the association was largely forced out of the market due to:

- Legislation designed to entrench the monopoly of the state-run South African Railways.
- Direct competition from better-funded white-owned operations.
- Regulatory pressure aimed at limiting Black economic independence in urban areas.

Despite these setbacks, Baloyi remained a wealthy and influential figure, using his resources to support community and political causes.

== Political career ==
=== African National Congress (ANC) ===
Baloyi's tenure as Treasurer-General (1937–1948) occurred during the presidency of Alfred Bitini Xuma, a period marked by the administrative reorganization of the ANC. In 1943, he served on the Atlantic Charter Committee, a prestigious body that drafted African Claims in South Africa, a document that demanded full citizenship and land rights for black South Africans in response to the Atlantic Charter.

In 1948, Baloyi was part of the ANC delegation tasked with negotiating a "United Front" with the All-African Convention (AAC) to coordinate resistance against the newly implemented Apartheid policy.

=== Community and Local Leadership ===
Within Alexandra, Baloyi was a fierce defender of property rights. In 1943, he chaired the Alexandra Anti-Expropriation Committee, successfully leading the opposition against government plans to seize land and remove residents from the township. He also represented Black interests on the Native Representative Council (1937–1942).

== Later years and the Conservative "Bloc" ==
In the 1950s, as the ANC moved toward more radical mass action and alliances with the South African Communist Party, Baloyi's political stance became increasingly moderate. He aligned himself with the "Nationalist Bloc" (or conservative Bloc) led by Selope Thema. This group advocated for a more "Africanist" and pro-capitalist approach, often clashing with the more militant leadership that emerged following the 1949 Programme of Action.

== Social contributions ==
Baloyi was also a prominent figure in the social and athletic life of Johannesburg. He served as the president of the Bantu Sports Club, which provided one of the few formal athletic venues for Black South Africans during the era.

== Death ==
Richard Granville Baloyi died in 1962
