= Alan Paton =

South African author (1903–1988)

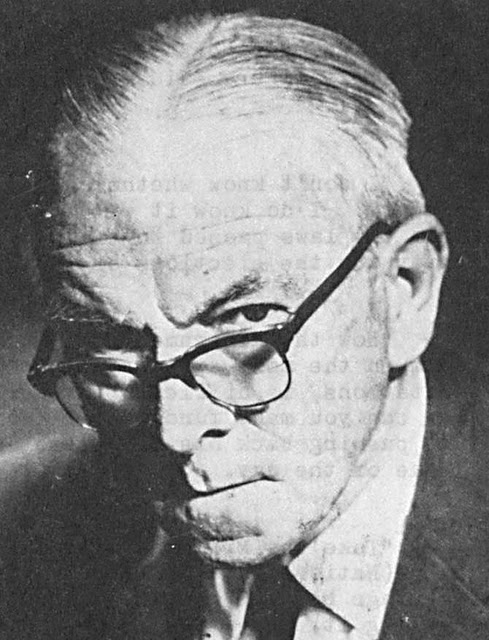
- Born: Alan Stewart Paton; 11 January 1903; Pietermaritzburg, Colony of Natal (in modern KwaZulu-Natal, South Africa)
- Died: 12 April 1988 (aged 85); Botha's Hill, South Africa
- Occupations: Author; anti-apartheid activist
- Spouse(s): Dorrie Francis Lusted (m. 1928–1967) Anne Hopkins (m. 1969–1988)
- Children: 2
- Writing career
- Language: English
- Notable works: Cry, the Beloved Country; Too Late the Phalarope, The Waste Land

Alan Stewart Paton (11 January 1903 – 12 April 1988) was a South African writer, anti-apartheid activist, and educator. His works include the novels Cry, the Beloved Country (1948), Too Late the Phalarope (1953), and the short story The Waste Land. He was posthumously awarded the Order of Ikhamanga in Gold for his literary contributions to the anti-apartheid movement.

== Early life ==
Paton was born in Pietermaritzburg in the Colony of Natal (South Africa's KwaZulu-Natal province). He was the son of James Paton, a civil servant and Scottish immigrant, and Eunice Warder Paton (née James), a schoolteacher of English descent. Both of his parents were deeply religious, raising him in the Christadelphian faith, and neither was highly educated. Paton's father was a strict disciplinarian whose beatings instilled in him a lasting opposition to corporal punishment, but who also introduced him to literature and inspired him to love nature. He was closer to his mother, who was well known for her integrity and faith. She had a strong influence over Paton's values as a child, particularly through the development of his compassion for others and his desire to promote social justice.

After attending Maritzburg College for high school, Paton earned a Bachelor of Science degree at the University of Natal in his hometown. He also got a diploma in education. After graduation, Paton worked as a teacher, first at the Ixopo High School, and subsequently at Maritzburg College.

== Early career ==
Paton served as the principal of Diepkloof Reformatory for young (native African) offenders from 1935 to 1949. A year before he started as principal, the South African parliament transferred reformatory institutions for juveniles from the Department of Prisons to the Union Education Department, opening up principal positions at several reformatories. Paton expressed interest in a principal position to his close friend Jan Hendrik Hofmeyr (1894–1948), a politician, who advised Paton to apply to them. Ultimately, Paton was appointed to principal at Diepkloof at the age of 32 on July 1, 1935. His main task, as expressed by Hofmeyer, was the transform Diepkloof from a prison to a school.

He introduced controversial progressive reforms, including policies on open dormitories, work permits, and home visitation. The young men were initially housed in closed dormitories; once they had proven themselves trustworthy, they would be transferred to open dormitories within the compound. Men who showed great trustworthiness would be permitted to work outside the compound. In some cases, men were permitted to reside outside the compound under the supervision of a care family. Fewer than 5% of the 10,000 men who were given home leave during Paton's years at Diepkloof ever broke their trust by failing to return.

== Later career ==
Paton volunteered for military service with the British Commonwealth forces during World War II, but was refused by the South African authorities. After the war he took a journey, at his own expense, to tour correctional facilities across the world. He toured Scandinavia, Britain, continental Europe, Canada, and the United States. During his time in Norway, he began work on his seminal novel Cry, the Beloved Country, which he completed over the course of his journey, finishing it on Christmas Eve in San Francisco in 1946. There, he met Aubrey and Marigold Burns, who read his manuscript and found a publisher: the editor Maxwell Perkins, noted for editing novels of Ernest Hemingway and Thomas Wolfe, guided Paton's first novel through publication with Scribner's.

In 1953, Paton published the novel Too Late the Phalarope.

On 11 January 2018, a Google Doodle honored the author on what would have been his 115th birthday.

== Opposition to apartheid ==
In 1948, four months after the publication of Cry, the Beloved Country, the right-wing National Party was elected to power in South Africa. Black South Africans did not receive the vote until 1994 so were unable to oppose this directly. The legislature soon passed laws to formally establish apartheid, a system of racial segregation.

Paton, together with Margaret Ballinger, Edgar Brookes, and Leo Marquard, formed the Liberal Association in early 1953. On 9 May 1953, it became the Liberal Party of South Africa, with Paton as a founding vice-president, which fought against the apartheid laws introduced by the National Party government. Alan and his wife Dorrie at times sought shelter from the police, at the safe house of Colin Webb.

Paton served as President of the LPSA until the government forced its dissolution in 1968 with the Prohibition of Political Interference Act which forbade political collaboration between different racial groups. Paton was a friend of Bernard Friedman, founder of the Progressive Party. Paton's writer colleague Laurens van der Post, who had moved to England in the 1930s, helped the party in many ways. The South African Secret Police were aware that van der Post was providing money to Paton and the LPSA, but they could not stop it by legal procedures.

Paton advocated peaceful opposition to apartheid, as did many others in the party. Yet, some LPSA members took a more violent stance − the African Resistance Movement (ARM). Consequently some stigma attached to the party, not just within South Africa, but also outside the country. The South African government confiscated Paton's passport when he returned from New York City in 1960, where he had been presented with the annual Freedom Award. His passport was not returned to him for ten years, making it impossible for him to travel to speak to other countries.

Paton retired to Botha's Hill, where he resided until his death. He is honored at the Hall of Freedom of the Liberal International organization.

== Other works ==
Paton continued to explore racial themes and apartheid in his second and third novels, Too Late the Phalarope (1953) and Ah, but Your Land Is Beautiful (1981), and his collected short stories, Tales From a Troubled Land (1961).

Ah, but Your Land Is Beautiful was built on parallel life stories, letters, speeches, news and records in legal proceedings. Its fictional characters interacted with some historic figures, such as Donald Molteno, Albert Luthuli and Hendrik Verwoerd. The novel is classified as historical fiction. It gives an accurate account of the resistance movement in South Africa during the 1960s.

"Paton attempts to imbue his characters with a humanity not expected of them. In this novel, for example, we meet the supposedly obdurate Afrikaner who contravenes the infamous Immorality Act. There are other Afrikaners, too, who are led by their consciences and not by rules, and regulations promulgated by a faceless, monolithic parliament."

He also wrote biographies of his friends Jan Hendrik Hofmeyr (Hofmeyr), and Geoffrey Clayton (Apartheid and the Archbishop). Another literary form that interested him throughout his life was poetry.

== Personal life ==
While at Ixopo, Paton met Dorrie Francis Lusted. They married in 1928, and remained together until her death from emphysema in 1967. Their life together is documented in Paton's memoir Kontakion for You Departed, (1969). They had two sons, Jonathan and David.

In 1969, Paton remarried, to Anne Hopkins. This marriage lasted until Paton's death in 1988.

Paton was a Christian. His faith was one of the reasons he was so strongly opposed to apartheid.

== Adaptations ==
Cry, the Beloved Country was twice adapted for films, in 1951 and 1995. It was the basis for the Broadway musical Lost in the Stars, which was adapted by American playwright Maxwell Anderson with music by Kurt Weill.

== Selected works ==
- Cry, The Beloved Country, 1948 – made into a film in 1951, directed by Zoltan Korda with a screenplay by Paton himself; in 1995, directed by Darrell Roodt; also a musical and an opera
- Lost in the Stars 1950 – a musical based on the above work (book and lyrics by Maxwell Anderson, music by Kurt Weill)
- Too Late the Phalarope, 1953
- The Land and People of South Africa, 1955
- South Africa in Transition, 1956
- Debbie Go Home, 1960
- Tales from a Troubled Land, 1961
- Hofmeyr, 1964
- South African Tragedy, 1965
- Sponono, 1965 (with Krishna Shah)
- The Long View, 1967
- Instrument of Thy Peace, 1968
- Kontakion For You Departed, 1969 (also: For You Departed)
- D. C. S. Oosthuizen Memorial Lecture, 1970
- Case History of a Pinky, 1972
- Apartheid and the Archbishop: the Life and Times of Geoffrey Clayton, Archbishop of Cape Town, 1973
- Knocking on the Door, 1975
- Towards the Mountain: An Autobiography, 1980
- Ah, but Your Land Is Beautiful, 1981
- Journey Continued: An Autobiography, 1988
- Save the Beloved Country, 1989
- The Hero of Currie Road: the complete short pieces, 2008

== Awards and honours ==
In 20 April 2006, Paton was posthumously awarded the Order of Ikhamanga in Gold for his "exceptional contribution to literature, exposing the apartheid oppression through his work and fighting for a just and democratic society."

== See also ==
- Liberalism
- Contributions to liberal theory
- List of African writers
- List of South Africans – In 2004, Paton was voted 59th in the SABC3's Great South Africans
