= Cry, the Beloved Country =

1948 novel by Alan Paton

- First US edition
- Author: Alan Paton
- Language: English
- Genre: novel
- Set in: Johannesburg and Natal, 1940s
- Publisher: Scribners (USA) & Jonathan Cape (UK)
- Publication date: 1 February 1948
- Publication place: South Africa
- Media type: Print (hard~ & paperback)
- Pages: 256 (hardback ed., UK) 273 (hardback ed., US)
- ISBN: 0-224-60578-X (hardback edition, UK)
- OCLC: 13487773
- Dewey Decimal: 823.914
- LC Class: PR9369.3 .P37

Cry, the Beloved Country is a 1948 novel by South African writer Alan Paton. Set in the prelude to apartheid in South Africa, it follows a black village priest and a white farmer who must deal with news of a murder.

American publisher Bennett Cerf remarked at that year's meeting of the American Booksellers Association that there had been "only three novels published since the first of the year that were worth reading… Cry, The Beloved Country, The Ides of March, and The Naked and the Dead." It remains one of the best-known works of South African literature.

Two cinema adaptations of the book have been made, the first in 1951 and the second in 1995. The novel was also adapted as a musical called Lost in the Stars (1949), with a book by the American writer Maxwell Anderson and music composed by the German emigre Kurt Weill.

== Plot ==
The story begins in the (fictional) village of Ndotsheni, near the real-life village of Ixopo, where the Christian priest Stephen Kumalo, a Zulu, receives a letter from the priest Theophilus Msimangu in Johannesburg. Msimangu urges Kumalo to come to the city to help his sister Gertrude because she is ill. Kumalo goes to Johannesburg to help her and find his son Absalom, who had gone to the city to look for Gertrude but never came home. It is a long journey to the great city of Johannesburg, and Kumalo sees the wonders of the modern world for the first time.

When he gets to the city, Kumalo learns that Gertrude has taken up a life of prostitution and beer brewing and is now drinking heavily. She agrees to return to the village with her young son. Assured by these developments, Kumalo embarks on the search for Absalom, first seeing his brother John, a carpenter who has become involved in the politics of South Africa. Kumalo and Msimangu follow Absalom's trail, only to learn that Absalom has been in a reformatory and will have a child with a young woman. Shortly thereafter, Kumalo discovers that his son has been arrested for murder. The victim is Arthur Jarvis, a white man who was killed during a burglary. Jarvis was an engineer and an Indigenous rights activist as well as the son of Kumalo's neighbour, James Jarvis.

Jarvis learns of his son's death and comes with his family to Johannesburg. Jarvis and his son had been distant, and now the father begins to know his son through his writings. Through reading his son's essays, Jarvis decides to take up his son's work for South Africa's black population.

Absalom reveals at his trial that he was pressured into committing a burglary by and with his two "friends", who later denied their involvement and threw all the blame on Absalom. Absalom is sentenced to death for the murder of Arthur Jarvis. Before his father returns to Ndotsheni, Absalom marries the girl carrying his child. She joins Kumalo's family. Kumalo returns to his village with his daughter-in-law and nephew, having found that Gertrude ran away the night before their departure.

Back in Ixopo, Kumalo makes a futile visit to the tribe's chief to discuss changes that must be made to help the barren village. Help arrives, however, when James Jarvis becomes involved in the work. He arranges for a dam to be built and hires a native agricultural demonstrator to implement new farming methods.

The novel ends at dawn on the morning of Absalom's execution. The fathers of the two children are devastated that both of their sons have wound up dead.

== Characters ==
- Stephen Kumalo: A 60-year-old Christian Zulu priest, the father of Absalom, who attempts to find his family in Johannesburg, and later to reconstruct the disintegrating state of his village. Book three focuses heavily on his relationship with James Jarvis.
- Theophilus Msimangu: A priest from Johannesburg who helps Kumalo find his son Absalom and his sister Gertrude.
- John Kumalo: Stephen's brother, who denies the tribal validity and becomes a spokesman for the new racial movement in the city; a former carpenter.
- Absalom Kumalo: Stephen's son who left home to look for Stephen's sister Gertrude and who murdered Arthur Jarvis. His name is an allusion to Absalom, wayward son of the Biblical King David.
- Gertrude Kumalo: The young sister of Stephen who becomes a prostitute in Johannesburg and leads a dissolute life.
- James Jarvis: A wealthy landowner whose son, Arthur, is murdered. He realizes the guilt of white residents in such crimes and forgives the Kumalos.
- Arthur Jarvis: Murdered by Absalom Kumalo, he is the son of James Jarvis. He had many liberal racial views that were highly significant and influential.
- Dubula: A big man who was the "heart" of anything and everything Arthur Jarvis did, including wanting peace between the races.
- Mr. Carmichael: Absalom's lawyer; he takes his case pro deo (for God) in this case meaning for free.
- Father Vincent: A priest from England who helps Stephen in his troubles.
- Mrs. Lithebe: A native housewife in whose house Stephen stays while in Johannesburg.
- The Harrisons: A father and son representing two opposing views concerning the racial problem. The father, Arthur's father-in-law, represents the traditional view, while the son represents the more liberal view.
- The Girl: A teenage girl, approximately 16 years old, impregnated by Absalom, whom she later marries. She tells Kumalo that Absalom will be her third husband and that her father abandoned her family when she was young. Given her young age, it is unclear if any of these marriages were wholly consensual.

== Main themes ==
Cry, the Beloved Country is a social protest against the structures of the society that would later give rise to apartheid. Paton attempts to create an unbiased and objective view of the dichotomies it entails: he depicts whites as affected by "native crime" while blacks suffer from social instability and moral issues due to the breakdown of the tribal system. It shows many of the problems with South Africa, such as the degrading of the land reserved for the natives, which is sometimes considered the central theme, the disintegration of the tribal community, native crime, and the flight to urban areas.

Another prevalent theme in Cry, the Beloved Country is the detrimental effects of fear on the characters and society of South Africa, as indicated in the following quotation from the narrator in Chapter 12:

Cry, the beloved country, for the unborn child that is the inheritor of our fear. Let him not love the earth too deeply. Let him not laugh too gladly when the water runs through his fingers, nor stand too silent when the setting sun makes red the veld with fire. Let him not be too moved when the birds of his land are singing, nor give too much of his heart to a mountain or a valley. For fear will rob him of all if he gives too much.

Paton frequently uses literary and linguistic devices such as microcosms, intercalary chapters and dashes instead of quotation marks for dialogue to indicate the start of speech.

== Background ==
Cry, the Beloved Country was written before the passage of a new law institutionalising the apartheid system in South Africa. The novel was published in 1948; apartheid became law later that year.

The book enjoyed critical success worldwide. Before Paton's death, it sold over 15 million copies.

The book is currently studied by many schools internationally. The writing style echoes the rhythms and tone of the King James Bible. Paton was a devout Christian.

Paton combined actual locales, such as Ixopo and Johannesburg, with fictional towns. The suburb in which Jarvis lived in Johannesburg, Parkwold, is fictional, but its ambiance is typical of the Johannesburg suburbs of Parktown and of Saxonwold. In the author's preface, Paton took pains to note that, apart from passing references to Jan Smuts and Sir Ernest Oppenheimer, all his characters were fictional.

== Allusions/references to other works ==
The novel is filled with Biblical references and allusions. The most evident are the names Paton gives to the characters. Absalom, the son of Stephen Kumalo, is named for the son of King David, who rose against his father in rebellion. Also, in the New Testament Book of Acts, Stephen was a martyr who underwent death by stoning rather than stopping declaring the things he believed. The Gospel of Luke and the Book of Acts are written to Theophilus, which is Greek for "friend of God".

In the novel, Absalom requests that his son be named "Peter", the name of one of Jesus's disciples. Among Peter's better-known traits is a certain impulsiveness; also, after Christ's arrest, he denied knowing Jesus three times and later wept in grief over this. After the resurrection, Peter renewed his commitment to Christ and to spreading the Gospel. All that suggests Absalom's final repentance and his commitment to his father's faith.

In another allusion, Arthur Jarvis is described as having a large collection of books on Abraham Lincoln, and Lincoln's writings are featured several times in the novel.

Paton describes Arthur's son as having characteristics similar to those of his childhood, which may allude to the resurrection of Christ.

== Film, television, and theatrical adaptations ==
In 1951, the novel was adapted into a motion picture of the same name, directed by Zoltan Korda. Paton wrote the screenplay with John Howard Lawson, who was left out of the original credits because he was blacklisted in Hollywood for refusing to give information to the House Un-American Activities Committee. Kumalo was played by Canada Lee, Jarvis by Charles Carson, and Msimangu by Sidney Poitier.

In 1983, a historic stage adaptation was performed by the Capital Players theatre group at the Moth Hall in Gaborone, Botswana. The country was at that time one of the leading "frontline states" to apartheid South Africa and a centre for artistic activity that often stood in quiet opposition to the racist regime just across the border. The premiere was attended by Paton himself, who had travelled from Natal, as well as Botswana's then-President Quett Masire (with political acumen, the director had arranged for the first performance to take place on the President's birthday). School students from across the country were bussed to the capital to see the production.

Another film version was released in 1995, directed by Darrell Roodt. James Earl Jones played the Reverend Kumalo and Richard Harris filled the role of Jarvis.

A stage version by the South African playwright Roy Sargeant was developed in early 2003. It was first staged at the National Arts Festival in Grahamstown, Eastern Cape on 27 June 2003 and at the Artscape Theatre in Cape Town on 8 July 2003. The director was Heinrich Reisenhofer. The script, together with notes and activities for school use, was published in 2006 by Oxford University Press Southern Africa. The play was produced by Independent Theatre in Adelaide, Australia, in 2006 and again in 2008.

=== Musical adaptation ===
In 1949, the composer Kurt Weill, in collaboration with the American writer Maxwell Anderson (book and lyrics), composed a musical based on the book called Lost in the Stars. The original Broadway production opened on 30 October 1949 at the Music Box Theatre and starred Todd Duncan and Inez Matthews. It ran for 273 performances before closing on 1 July 1950. It was made into a movie, starring Brock Peters and Melba Moore, and released in 1974.

Lost in the Stars is the last work Weill completed before he died in 1950. Although he was influenced by spirituals, jazz, and blues, Weill's distinctive and original style shines throughout the score.

Israeli contratenor David D'Or performed in a stage version at the Israeli National Theater ("Habima Theater") in 2004. Maariv in its review wrote: "D'or's outstanding voice is meant for great parts. His voice and presence embraces the audience, who showed their appreciation by a lengthy standing ovation."

In August 2012, the Glimmerglass Opera of New York produced the work, in conjunction with Cape Town Opera, directed by Tazewell Thompson.
