= Talloires Network of Engaged Universities =

- Formation: September 2005
- Type: Higher Education
- Headquarters: Tufts University
- Chair: Nieves Segovia
- Vice Chair: George Ladaah Openjuru
- Website: talloiresnetwork.tufts.edu

The Talloires Network of Engaged Universities is an international association of institutions which aims to foster higher education civic engagement. Its secretariat is based at Tufts University. The network began in September 2005 with a global conference involving 29 higher education heads from 23 countries who gathered at the Tufts University European Center in Talloires, France. The Network has over 400 member institutions in 78 countries. The Network hosts conferences, produces publications on university civic engagement, provides financial and technical support to regional university networks, and awards the annual Ma net Media Prize for university student civic engagement initiatives. The Executive Director of the Talloires Network of Engaged Universities is a Dr. Lorelene Hoy.
