= PRxPR =

PRxPR is a non-governmental, private disaster relief fund which was created to provide short-term recovery efforts as well as rebuilding assistance to Puerto Rico in the wake of the devastation caused by hurricanes Irma and Maria. They have continued to work in providing sustainable infrastructure changes to the island, as well as grants and assistance to individuals in the hardest hit areas.

== Formation ==
PRxPR was created immediately after category five hurricane Maria passed directly over Puerto Rico, causing widespread devastation across the island. Puerto Rico was left with no electricity nor available water island-wide. PRxPR was created with the goal of unifying Puerto Ricans both on and off the island in the immediate efforts of helping those in greatest need, as well as a long-term goal of assisting in rebuilding a better Puerto Rico.

The founders of PRxPR are:

- Carmen Báez (Former President, Latin America – Omnicom Group)
- María Celeste Arrarás (Emmy Award Journalist/Author – Telemundo NBCU)
- Francisco J. Cerezo, Esq. (Partner /US Head of Latin America – DLA Piper, LLP)
- Marilú Medina, Esq. (Senior Counsel – Fortune 100 Company, former partner O’Neill & Borges, LLC)
- Jorge Silva Puras, Esq. (Former Chief of Staff to the Governor of Puerto Rico)

By October 2017 PRxPR had already raised over $530,000. The money was immediately used to provide small grants to individuals and organizations on the island to procure urgent needs of what items could be found. Initially, just obtaining necessary items was difficult. "You get a private cargo plane landing in the Aguadilla airport, and when that plane lands, is that there's not enough personnel to help unload the plane," said PRxPR co-founder Carmen Baez,”There’s not enough personnel to guard the merchandise, to load the trucks, to drive the trucks to where they're needed.”

The organization has continued for the last several years now to focus on the infrastructure of the island, helping to install solar energy, water purification systems, distribute water, food and medical aid, repair structures, and provide grants to individuals, especially farmers to help them individually recover and aid in the overall recovery. “People have lost their livestock - the chicken that laid the eggs, the pork that provided the meat, their orchards and gardens that provided their vegetables.”

As Federal Aid is slow to come, organizations like PRxPR are continue to provide help and hope to the people of Puerto Rico. “The most disadvantaged victims of Hurricane Maria are now the ones that are further suffering under the burden of politics,” Carmen Baez is quoted to say. “If the federal aid was limited and slow before, now it will be worse.”

A year after the storm Francisco Cerezo, an attorney and one of the founders of PRxPR, said "There is still a lot of need, But if there is one ‘semi-silver lining,’ it's that people have united to help.The diaspora always had many different kinds of divisions,” he continued. “There are all kinds of ways Puerto Ricans self-identified. But after María, the walls of self-identification came down. We rallied for each other and will continue to do so.”

100% of the donations collected by PRxPR are directed to helping, as none of the principles or volunteers are paid, and in fact themselves cover all overhead and operating expenses. Donations come both from individuals, as well as the support of several partner businesses and organizations. Puerto Rican journalist Maria Celeste commented “I continue with PRxPR (Puerto Rico for Puerto Rico), an organization with diaspora groups, that we are working on many projects, such as the construction of an orphanage for girls in Arecibo, but we are waiting for an important donation. We continue to insist on doing works that make a difference because the important thing is not to give up, “.
