= Sponono Baloyi =

South African politician (1940–2021)

Member of the National Assembly
- In office May 1994 – April 2004

Personal details
- Born: 10 July 1940 Sabie, Eastern Transvaal; Union of South Africa
- Died: 12 May 2021 (aged 80)
- Citizenship: South Africa
- Party: African National Congress
- Spouse: Fanyana Baloyi (died 2021)
- Education: Technikon Witwatersrand; University of Bristol

Sponono Francinah Baloyi (10 July 1940 – 12 May 2021) was a South African politician who represented the African National Congress (ANC) in the National Assembly from 1994 until her retirement in 2004. A nurse by profession, she was briefly the Minister of Health and Welfare in the government of the KaNgwane bantustan from 1992 to 1994.

== Early life and medical career ==
Sponono was born on 10 July 1940 in Sabie in the former Eastern Transvaal. After finishing high school, she moved to Johannesburg, where she studied nursing at the Raheema Moosa Mother and Child Hospital and midwifery at the Chris Hani Baragwanath Hospital. In 1965 she returned to the Transvaal Lowveld to work as a general nurse at Rob Ferreira Hospital in Mbombela and then as a senior community health nurse at Themba Hospital in KaBokweni; in the later position, she was involved in oversight of all public clinics in the Eastern Transvaal.

In the interim between those two positions, she studied public health at Witswatersrand Advanced Technikon in 1971, and during her time there, she won an award from the South African Institute of Public Health for obtaining the highest marks in the country. In 1984, she travelled to the United States – her first time on an airplane – as part of the USAID Africa Leadership Programme, and in 1992 she received a British Council scholarship to complete a master's degree in primary health care at the University of Bristol.

== Political career ==
Also in 1992, Baloyi was appointed as Minister of Health and Welfare in the government of the KaNgwane bantustan. In subsequent years, she was a delegate to the Convention for a Democratic South Africa.

In the 1994 general election, which disbanded KaNgwane and marked the end of apartheid, Baloyi was elected to an ANC seat in the new National Assembly. She served two terms in the seat, gaining re-election in 1999, before retiring to Mbombela after the 2004 general election.

Soon into her retirement, in May 2005, she was appointed as deputy chairperson of the board of the Mpumalanga Economic Empowerment Corporation. In 2019, the Tshwane University of Technology awarded her an honorary doctorate in nursing.

== Personal life and death ==
She was married to Fanyana Baloyi, a prominent businessman in Mpumalanga and formerly an administrator at Rob Ferreira Hospital. She died on 12 May 2021 after a short illness; her husband had died five days earlier.
