= The Light in the Piazza =

The Light in the Piazza may refer to:

- The Light in the Piazza (novel), 1960 novella written by Elizabeth Spencer
- Light in the Piazza (film), a 1962 movie starring Olivia de Havilland
- The Light in the Piazza (musical), a 2003 stage musical
