= Adam Guettel =

American composer-lyricist (born 1964)

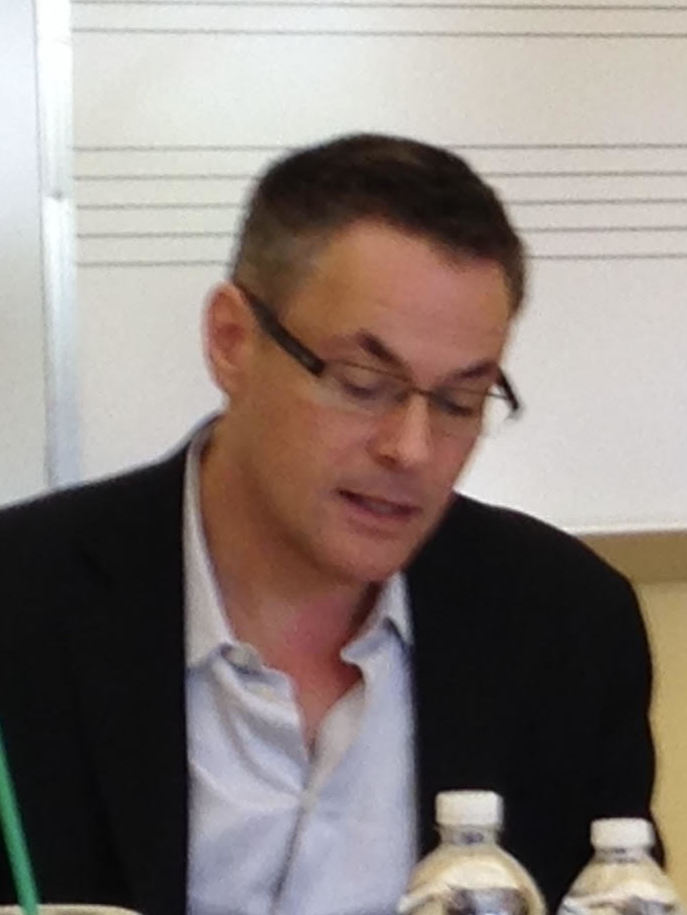

Background information
- Born: December 16, 1964 (age 61); New York City, U.S.
- Genre: Musical theatre
- Occupations: Composer, lyricist
- Years active: 1996–present
- Label: Nonesuch / Elektra Records
- Website: adamguettel.com

Adam Guettel (/ˈɡɛtəl/; born December 16, 1964) is an American composer-lyricist of musical theater and opera. Guettel has written the Broadway musicals Floyd Collins (1994), The Light in the Piazza (2003), and Days of Wine and Roses (2023).

As a composer and lyricist, Guettel has earned acclaim and numerous accolades, including two Tony Awards, two Drama Desk Awards, The Stephen Sondheim Award, the Richard Rodgers Award, and the Frederick Loewe Award.

== Early life, family, and education ==
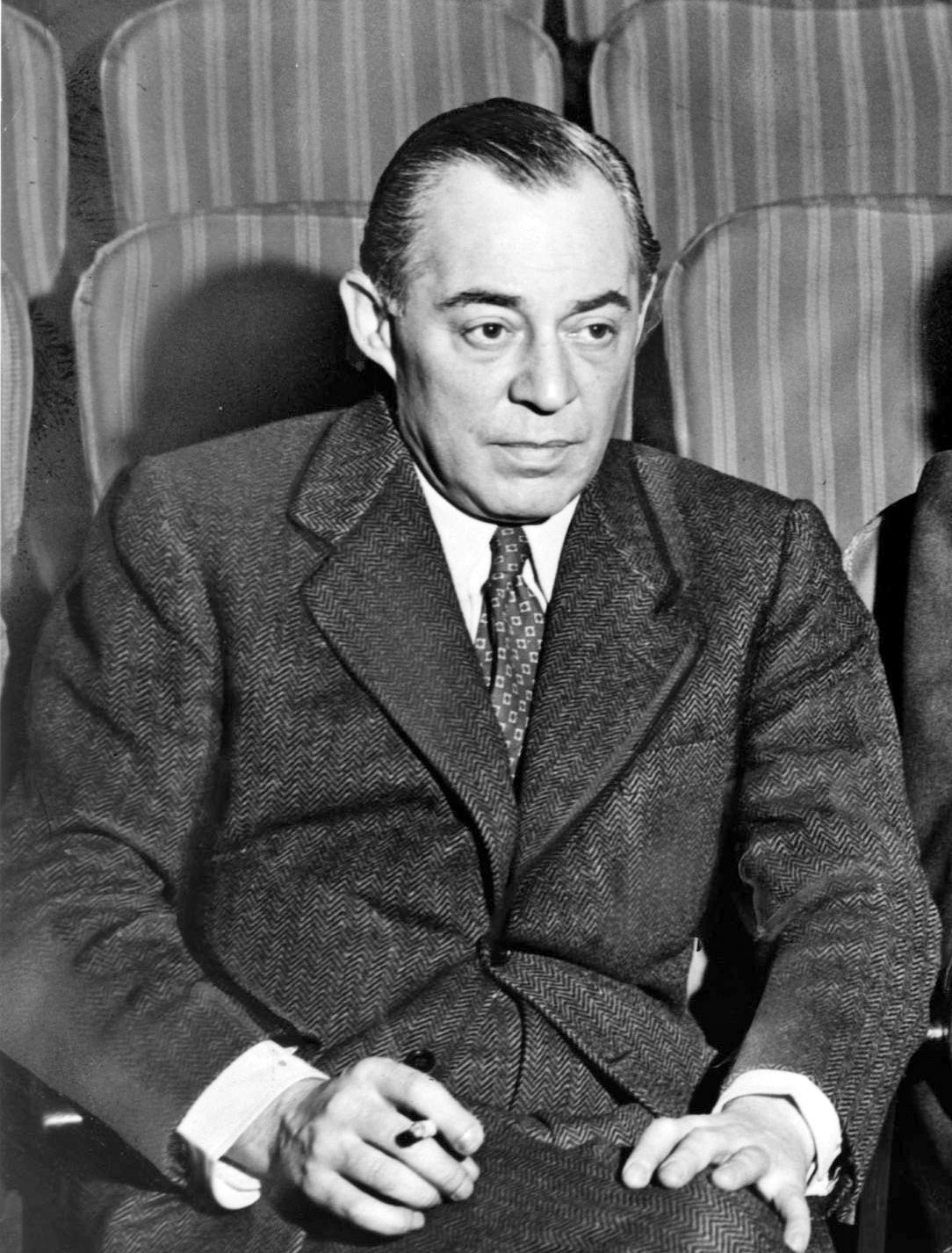
Adam Guettel is the grandson of composer Richard Rodgers

Adam Guettel, who is of Jewish heritage, was born on December 16, 1964. Guettel is the son of composer, author and Juilliard School chairman Mary Rodgers, who died on June 26, 2014, and grandson of musical theater composer Richard Rodgers. His father, Henry Guettel (died October 7, 2013), was a film executive and was the executive director of the Theatre Development Fund. He was raised on the Upper West Side of New York City. Despite his mother starting her career writing musicals, Rodgers had moved on to novels by the time Guettel was born, making music uncommon in his childhood home.

Guettel has four siblings. Another brother, Matthew, died at age three of asthma—Guettel's LLC is called Matthew Music.

Guettel began performing as a boy soprano soloist in operas including Pelléas et Mélisande and The Magic Flute, both at the Metropolitan Opera and the New York City Opera, and in another production of Pelléas with the Santa Fe Opera. He was also slated to play Amahl in the film remake of Gian Carlo Menotti's Amahl and the Night Visitors. After Guettel's voice changed, it "became a very light, high tenor", ending his boy soprano career.

Guettel played bass guitar in rock groups, but felt he wasn't good enough at the instrument, and that even if he was "even a bass solo is not that satisfying. It is like putting a sail on a car." For a short time, Guettel expected he would become an actor, "like any American boy in the '80s", but gave up after auditioning for a production of The Sound of Music and being told that he acted like a "cancer patient" by director Jay Harnick. In his collegiate years and into his early twenties, Guettel worked as a rock and jazz musician, singing and playing bass, before realizing "that writing for character and telling stories through music was something that I really loved to do, and that allowed me to express love".

=== Mentorship by Stephen Sondheim and Mary Rodgers ===
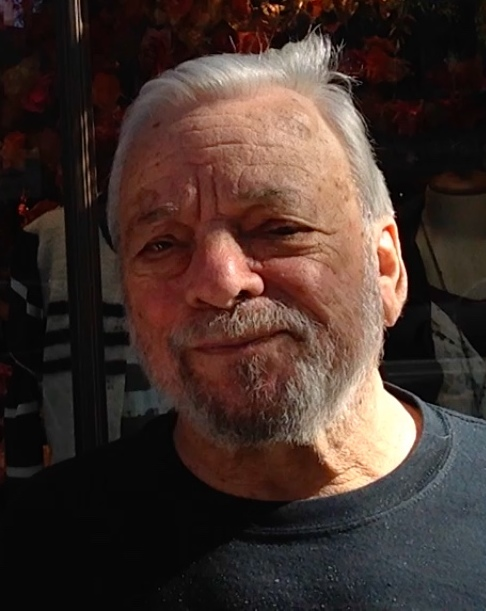
Guettel was mentored and influenced by composer Stephen Sondheim

Soon, turning to musical theatre composition, he was mentored by Stephen Sondheim. Guettel recalled how as a 14-year-old boy he showed Sondheim his work. Guettel was "crestfallen" since he had come in "sort of all puffed up thinking [he] would be rained with compliments and things", which was not the case since Sondheim had some "very direct things to say". Later, Sondheim wrote and apologized to Guettel for being "not very encouraging" when he was actually trying to be "constructive". He assured the 14-year-old Guettel that he thought him to be "literate, intelligent, and talented", and told him to "keep writing, because that's what we all do". Years later, Sondheim included Guettel's song "The Riddle Song" from Floyd Collins on his list of "songs he wished he'd written". Guettel credits Sondheim with his focus on clarity as the central rule in his writing. In September 2009, Guettel and Sondheim "broke down the art of songwriting" in an hour-long interview for the Dramatists Guild of America. After Sondheim's death, Guettel wrote the "last word" for the Library of Congress's magazine on his work.

When Guettel took up music composition in his mid-teens, his mother said that she offered him advice for around a year. "After that, he was so far beyond anything I could ever have dreamed of, I just backed off." Richard Rodgers, who died when Guettel was 15, overheard an early composition, said he liked it, and asked him to play it louder. Guettel has qualified the compliment, noting that "He was literally on his deathbed on the other side of the living-room wall."

=== Education ===
Guettel attended Phillips Exeter Academy, School Year Abroad (SYA France) and Interlochen Center for the Arts. He attended Yale University, where he met frequent collaborator Tina Landau. Guettel wrote a song for a revue Landau was directing, the first of many collaborations between the pair. While at Yale, Guettel took time off from school to work as John Mauceri's assistant and the DX7 consultant on the Broadway musical Song and Dance.

== Career ==
=== 1987–1999: Early work and Floyd Collins ===
==== Post-college work ====
After graduating from Yale University in 1987, Guettel's first major project was the score of The Legend of Oedipus, a retelling of the story of Oedipus directed by Nikos Psacharopoulos, head of the Williamstown Theater Festival. Guettel and Landau collaborated on an adaptation of A Christmas Carol produced by Trinity Repertory Company in Providence, Rhode Island 1989. According to Guettel, the production was a difficult experience. He recalls breaking his pencil point "about 45 times" during a run-through, taking notes on his problems with the way his score was being done. When Guettel told the musical director they needed more rehearsal time, they replied that there was no time. Guettel was "furious" and started punching a wall in the back of the theater, breaking his hand and wrist in three places. In the adaptation, Guettel used the original Dickens text as the lyrics. Fellow composer Ricky Ian Gordon wrote that there was a song in the show where the character, Belle, sings to Scrooge "I release you with a full heart for the love of him you once were", which made Gordon "almost burst into tears". Guettel said this experience taught him that he must "let go" to be a strong collaborator. Marjoree Samoff, producing director of the American Music Theater Festival saw the show and commissioned Guettel and Landau to write a new piece together.

==== Floyd Collins ====
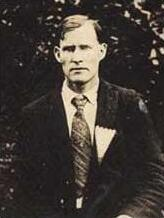
Floyd Collins

Landau began to search for a subject for the two to work on. "The spark" came when Landau and Guettel discovered a 1976 American Heritage article titled "Dark Carnival", a recounting of the story of Floyd Collins. Guettel claims his fascination with Collins' story came from a personal link. "This is right when I'm starting my career in musical theatre with Richard Rodgers as my Grandfather... I think I was writing it, on some level, to process the likelihood that I wouldn't match his career, to answer if there's nobility in failing at something noble" Guettel adds that his confidence in the idea came from his mentor Stephen Sondheim believing it was good idea for a musical. Sondheim was a fan of Ace in the Hole, a film loosely based on Collins' story and said it's a "fun idea for a show". Floyd Collins was originally staged at the American Music Theater Festival in Philadelphia, in 1994, in a workshop where Guettel not only wrote the music and lyrics, but also starred as Floyd's brother, Homer. On the subject of adapting the true story of Floyd Collins, Guettel stated "We're true to the spirit of the story, but we are circling it for the most dramatic angle". The musical opened at Playwrights Horizons on February 9, 1996. In The New York Times review of the show, critic Ben Brantley noted "Mr. Guettel establishes himself as a young composer of strength and sophistication, weaving strands from the Americana of Copland and the uneasy dissonance of Sondheim". Later, Guettel would say that it was his time working on Floyd which made him certain that he would spend his life writing music for the theatre.

==== Saturn Returns/Myths & Hymns ====
The second project he developed with Landau and Sperling was a song cycle titled Saturn Returns (recorded as Myths and Hymns). The piece musicalizes pieces of mythology, including the stories of Hero and Leander, Icarus, Medusa, as well as classic hymns. Discussing its genesis, Guettel stated "I had been writing these myths just because I was just starting out as a writer, and you don't know what to write. I did stuff that was tried and true. That was enough to keep me busy. Then I came across this book in an old antique shop... And it was just the words to a bunch of hymns... For some reason out of this Upper West Side Jew comes all of this music to these hymn lyrics". At first, Guettel was adapting the hymns and myths as separate projects, until Landau suggested they would work well together. "And we realized in some ways that the hymns are who we would have ourselves be, and the myths are basically who we are, and that they can kind of antiphonally talk to each other", said Guettel, in a 2021 New York Times interview on the online MasterVoices production of the piece. The piece was performed at The Public Theater and was later recorded by Nonesuch Records with performances by Billy Porter, Mandy Patinkin, Kristin Chenoweth, and Guettel himself.

==== Collaboration with Audra McDonald, incidental music, and concert work ====
Guettel has written bespoke songs, including several songs throughout Audra McDonald's discography. Her 1998 album Way Back to Paradise includes his songs "Come to Jesus" (from Myths and Hymns), "A Tragic Story", "Baby Moon" and "The Allure of Silence". Her 2000 album's namesake is the closing number of Floyd Collins, "How Glory Goes", and also includes "Was That You". Her 2006 album is named after his song "Build a Bridge" and also includes "Dividing Day" (from The Light in the Piazza). Her 2018 album Sing Happy includes "March is a Windy Month" (from Millions). In 2003, it was announced that Guettel would be writing a new piece for McDonald which would have opened Carnegie Hall's Zankel Hall, but this piece never came to fruition.

In addition to writing music and lyrics for musical theatre, Guettel has written incidental music for plays such as Lydie Breeze (2000), as well as film scores. In summer 2007, Guettel composed incidental music for a production of Anton Chekhov's play Uncle Vanya at the Intiman Playhouse in Seattle, Washington.

In 1999, Guettel performed a concert evening of his own work at New York's Town Hall with guests such as Kristin Chenoweth, Audra McDonald, Billy Porter, Jubilant Sykes and Theresa McCarthy. At first, Guettel resisted doing this concert at all, believing that his work had been heard enough in New York City, and he wanted to focus on writing something new, rather than having songs he had already written performed. It was Robert Hurwitz, the president of Nonesuch Records at the time, who insisted Guettel do the concert. Guettel has also contributed original scores to several documentary films, including Arguing the World and Jack: The Last Kennedy Film. In 2004, Guettel contributed vocals to Jessica Molaskey's P.S. Classics album Make Believe, dueting with Molaskey on his grandfather's song "Glad To Be Unhappy". Guettel also sang on albums by Ricky Ian Gordon, John Buccino, and starred opposite Meryl Streep in the short film The Music of Regret, singing several songs as a ventriloquist dummy. In 2001, he was set to sing as Charles on a studio recording of Evening Primrose. Guettel was beginning to write The Light in the Piazza, saying "bells were ringing, and things were starting to come out of me", and wanted to focus on his own work, rather than his mentor Sondheim's. Guettel was told by the producer of the album that it would not be a problem if he left the project, and that they would replace him with Neil Patrick Harris. After Guettel quit, he opened his mailbox to find a "withering" letter from Sondheim. They quickly reconciled. From then on, Guettel would primarily work as a composer/lyricist.

=== 2005–2020: The Light at the Piazza, The Princess Bride, and other work ===
==== The Light in the Piazza ====
After Floyd Collins, Guettel reportedly hoped to work on a love story. His mother suggested an adaptation that she had once pitched to her father, The Light in the Piazza by Elizabeth Spencer. Guettel worked on the project for 6 years, working with several book-writers, including Arthur Laurents and Alfred Uhry. According to Guettel, he and Uhry did not "get a lot done" together. Soon after, Guettel received a fellowship from Sundance, eventually leading to his collaboration with bookwriter Craig Lucas. At the Sundance Theatre Laboratory in 2002, Lucas and Guettel collaborated with director Michael Greif. Greif did not continue with the project, but would reunite with Guettel and Lucas nearly 20 years later, on Days of Wine and Roses. Kelli O'Hara also joined the project at Sundance, originally playing the role of Franca. The Light in the Piazza went on to make its world premiere production at Seattle's Intiman Theater, where Lucas also directed the piece. Guettel asked the theater to not mention his grandfather in the advertising material. Bartlett Sher eventually replaced Lucas as director.

Guettel co-orchestrated the musical with Ted Sperling and Bruce Coughlin. The Light in the Piazza opened on Broadway in 2005. The show, which starred Victoria Clark and Kelli O'Hara, met with mixed critical notices, but on June 5, 2005, Adam Guettel won the Tony Award for Best Original Score and the Tony Award for Best Orchestrations. The show was filmed for and aired on PBS.

==== The Princess Bride and To Kill a Mockingbird ====
He spent much of the period from 2005 to 2007 working on a musical adaptation of The Princess Bride with original screenwriter William Goldman. As of January 2007, Guettel had written the music for ten songs for the project. An orchestral suite from the score was performed at the Hollywood Bowl in November 2006, and Lincoln Center conducted a workshop of Bride in January 2007. The project was abandoned when Goldman reportedly demanded 75 percent of the author's share, even though Guettel was writing both the music and the lyrics.

In July 2009, the Signature Theatre of Arlington, Virginia, commissioned Guettel to write a new musical for their 2011–2012 season, under the auspices of their American Musical Voices Project. This would reportedly be a musical adaptation of the Danny Boyle film Millions. Other projects in development included an opera based on the short stories of Washington Irving.

Guettel wrote the original score for the original Broadway production of the play To Kill a Mockingbird (2018), for which he received a Tony Award nomination.

=== 2020–present: Return to Broadway ===
==== Days of Wine and Roses ====
The idea to adapt J.P Miller's Days of Wine and Roses into a musical came to Guettel twenty years before it came to Broadway. He was working on The Light in the Piazza with Kelli O'Hara, when they began formulating an idea for a "weird dark opera" adaptation of Miller's story. Guettel and eventual bookwriter Craig Lucas, had both struggled with alcoholism, which they say informed the development of the piece.

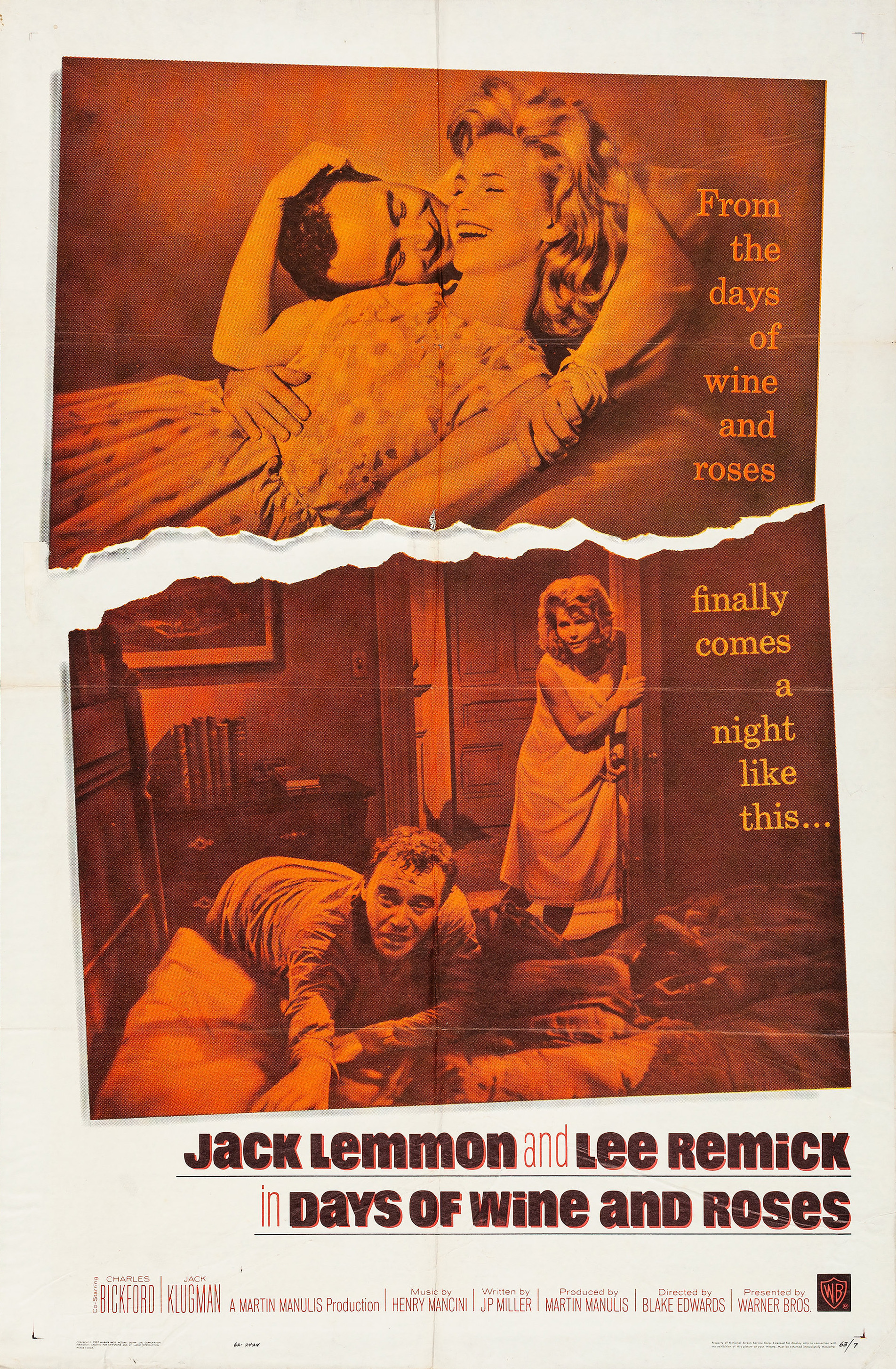
Poster for the 1952 film, Days of Wine and Roses

When he began writing it, Guettel received criticism from friends who did not believe such a tragic tale should be musicalized. "My response was, 'Well, Sweeney Todd wasn't exactly someone you had over for Sunday brunch.'" The piece became centered around O'Hara as Kirsten Arnesen, the role made famous by Lee Remick, and Brian d'Arcy James, who worked with Guettel on Floyd Collins and Myths and Hymns, as Joe Clay, the role made famous by Jack Lemmon.

Despite the show having an ensemble, Guettel chose to only have the central couple and their daughter sing. "For me, it was the most important piece that I’ve ever done in that sense that I could really sculpt this for these two great artists," Guettel said.

In January 2023, Atlantic Theater Company announced an eight-week world premiere production of Guettel's adaptation of Days of Wine and Roses, with music, lyrics, and orchestrations by Guettel, book by Craig Lucas (Guettel's collaborator on The Light in the Piazza, almost 20 years previously), and direction by Michael Greif. The production starred Kelli O'Hara and Brian D'Arcy James and was the first full production of a new musical by Guettel since Piazza. Days of Wine and Roses moved to Broadway, premiering on January 6, 2024, for a 16-week run.

==== Millions ====
Shortly after Days of Wine and Roses closed on Broadway, it was announced that Guettel's musical Millions would make its world premiere at the Alliance Theater. The production was directed by Guettel's longtime collaborator, Bartlett Sher, with a book by Bob Martin. The musical is based on the Danny Boyle film of the same name, which Guettel saw as "a wonderful movie with a huge heart. Some of the important characters are a little bit underwritten and under-realized – which is always a good thing for those of us who want to adapt to the stage". Guettel was attracted to the movie's combination of "soft and hard" elements. When Guettel first began writing the piece, in 2014, his mother died, connecting him to the plot of the piece, which centers around the loss of a mother. Guettel said he believes Millions is at its best "when that membrane between what's terrestrial and celestial starts to become penetrable". The show received mixed-positive reviews during its out of town tryout.

==== Floyd Collins on Broadway ====
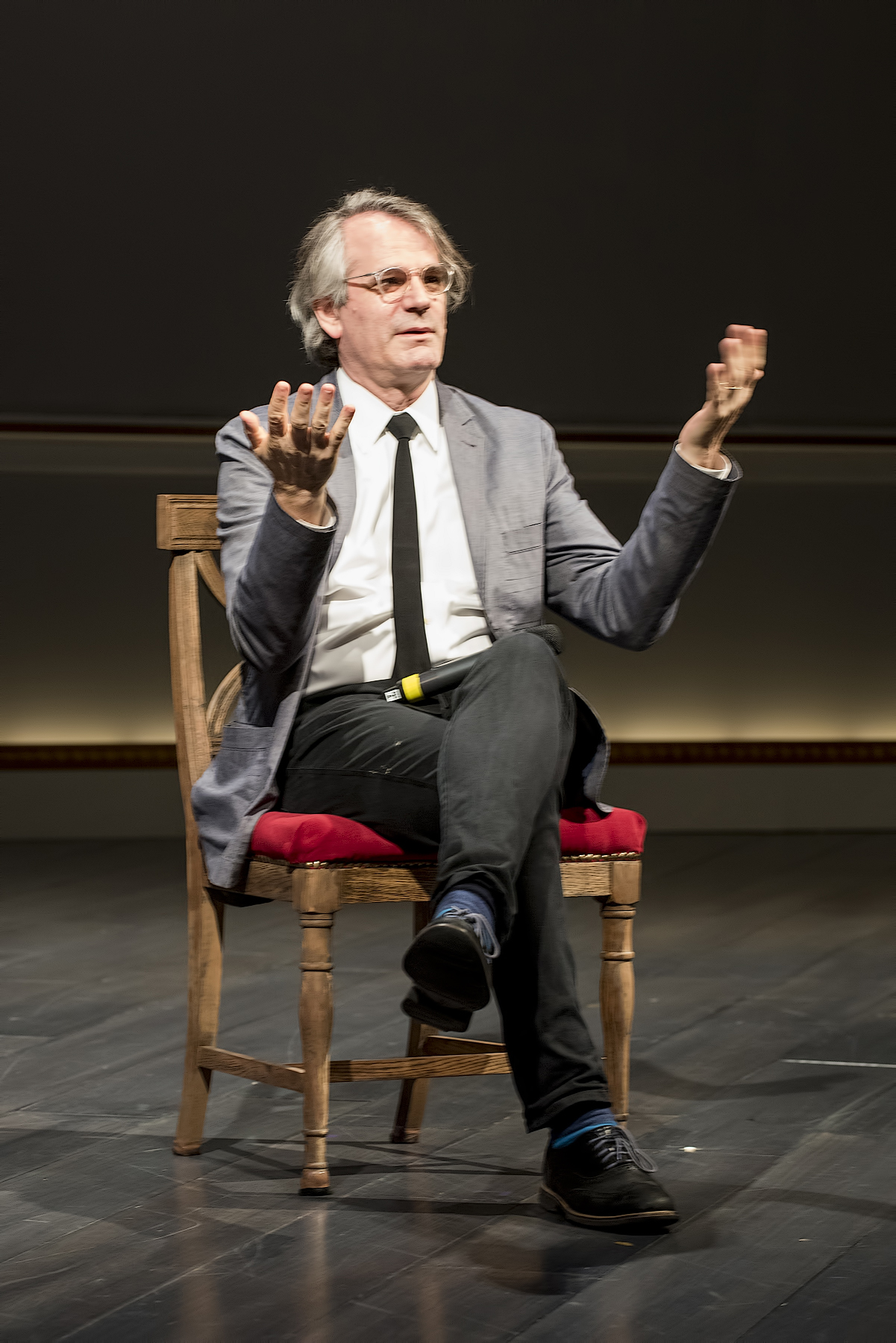
Guettel has collaborated with Bartlett Sher on The Light in the Piazza, The unmade The Princess Bride musical, To Kill a Mockingbird, and Millions.

In June 2024, it was announced that Floyd Collins would come to Broadway as a part of Lincoln Center Theater's 40th Anniversary season. Plans to revisit the piece had been years in the making, with Landau saying she and Guettel were "never really done" with the piece. Guettel and Landau did a rewrite of the show, with many of the "colloquialisms" being taken out of the book, as well as changes on a deeper level. These rewrites included a new version of the song "And She'd Have Blue Eyes", with Guettel writing a second half to the song, which was sung by Jeremy Jordan in this production. Guettel additionally made changes to the songs "'Tween a Rock", "Lucky", "Daybreak", and "The Riddle Song". Many of the songs also got new titles to match the Guettel and Landau's vision. The aeformentioned "Tween a Rock" was originally "Tween a Rock an' a hard place", and "Git Comfortable" was renamed "Get Comfortable". The duo also moved the aria, "It Moves", from the beginning of the show to the middle of act two.

Guettel and Landau were nominated for a Tony Award for Best Revival of a Musical for this production. A cast recording was made by Center Stage Records. Guettel co-produced the record with Lawrence Manchester and Ted Sperling. The album charted in 19 countries, reaching 21 on the ITunes charts.

==== Teaching ====
Another major aspect of Guettel's career is his work as a teacher. Since 1995, he has taught masterclasses and seminars in musical theatre performance and songwriting, considering this to be an important complement to his work as a composer. He has led such classes at DePauw University, DePaul University, New York University, Pace University, Harvard University, Yale University, Princeton University, Emerson College, Elon University, The Boston Conservatory, Southern Methodist University, Syracuse University, Wagner College and many others. Guettel also teaches singers privately, as well as leading masterclasses at his home studio. Guettel has led two voice masterclasses with NATS, one in 2023 and one in 2025, and co-taught a masterclass with Craig Carnelia at his home studio in 2024.

Guettel received an honorary doctorate from Lehman College in 2007 , and was made an honorary member of the Royal Academy of Music in 2019. He is a founding board member of Vermonters for a Clean Environment.

== Style and influences ==
Early on, Guettel's music was almost immediately characterized by its complexity and chromaticism. Early in his career, when asked about his approach to music, Guettel stated "to me, harmony is a continuum from Gregorian stricture to atonal chaos. And my music obviously lands somewhere in between there and occasionally accesses either pole. To me harmony is just a way of creating emotional syntax in songwriting or in music making, or in storytelling with music. Emotional syntax for me comes through harmony. Harmony as an emotional tool, I think, is predominately a tonal thing, as far as how it effects the listener. And dissonance is another color, it's another thing that is emotionally useful."

His major influences include Igor Stravinsky, Maurice Ravel, Claude Debussy, Benjamin Britten, and Stevie Wonder. Stephen Sondheim has referred to Guettel's work as "dazzling." In an interview, Guettel stated a portion of his influences that included I. M. Pei, Louis Kahn, Vincent Scully, Jane Jacobs, Igor Stravinsky, Stevie Wonder, Adam de la Halle, Harry Nilsson, Ruth Bader Ginsburg, Björk, Erich Wolfgang Korngold, Benjamin Britten, William Inge, Stephen Sondheim, Jody Williams, and Marvin Gaye.

== Discography ==
Guettel has had a lengthy recording career. He began the career as a session musician, playing bass on the records Duke Ellington's Pousse-Cafe, Ellis Larkin Plays, and the original Broadway cast recording of Andrew Lloyd Webber's Song and Dance. Since then, he has moved on to producing. He has produced the original Broadway cast albums of the two most recent productions of his own musicals, Days of Wine and Roses and Floyd Collins, as well as producing the 2025 Broadway Cast Recording of Once Upon a Mattress.

=== Composer/lyricist ===
| Year | Title | Role | Notes |
|---|---|---|---|
| 1997 | Floyd Collins: Original Cast Recording | Composer/Lyricist/Guitar | |
| 1998 | Audra McDonald: Way Back to Paradise | Composer/Lyricist/Vocalist | |
| 1999 | Myths and Hymns-Original Cast Recording | Composer/Lyricist/Vocalist | |
| 2000 | Audra McDonald: How Glory Goes | Composer/Lyricist | |
| 2000 | Billie Stritch: Jazz Live | Composer/Lyricist | |
| 2001 | Stars and the Moon: Betty Buckley Live at the Donmar | Composer/Lyricist | |
| 2002 | Jack Donahue: Lighthouse | Composer/Lyricist/Vocalist | |
| 2005 | Billy Porter: At the Corner of Broadway + Soul | Composer/Lyricist | |
| 2005 | The Light in the Piazza: Original Broadway Cast Recording | Composer/Lyricist | Also sings on bonus tracks: "Dividing Day (Demo)" and "Love to Me (Demo)" |
| 2006 | Audra McDonald: Build a Bridge | Composer/Lyricist | |
| 2007 | David Burnham | Composer/Lyricist | |
| 2007 | Victoria Clark: Fifteen Seconds of Grace | Composer/Lyricist | |
| 2007 | Lauren Kennedy: Here and Now | Composer/Lyricist | |
| 2007 | Kelli O'Hara: Wonder in the World | Composer/Lyricist | |
| 2008 | John Treacy Egan: Count the Stards | Composer/Lyricist | |
| 2009 | Robyn North: Make Believe | Composer/Lyricist | |
| 2011 | Kelli O'Hara: Always | Composer/Lyricist | |
| 2013 | Judy Kuhn: All This Happiness | Composer/Lyricist | |
| 2013 | Audra McDonald: Go Back Home | Composer/Lyricist | |
| 2017 | Bob Mundy: Love to Me | Composer/Lyricist | |
| 2018 | Renee Fleming: Broadway | Composer/Lyricist | |
| 2018 | Audra McDonald: Sing Happy | Composer/Lyricist | |
| 2023 | Days of Wine and Roses: Original Cast Recording | Composer/Lyricist/Producer | |
| 2025 | Floyd Collins: Original Broadway Cast Recording | Composer/Lyricist | |

=== Vocalist ===
| Year | Title | Role | Notes |
|---|---|---|---|
| 1998 | Audra McDonald: Way Back to Paradise | Composer/Lyricist/Vocalist | |
| 1999 | Myths and Hymns: Original Cast Recording | Composer/Lyricist/Vocalist | |
| 2000 | Grateful: The Songs of John Bucchino | Vocalist | |
| 2001 | Bright Eyed Joy: The Songs of Ricky Ian Gordon | Vocalist | |
| 2002 | Jack Donahue: Lighthouse | Composer/Lyricist/Vocalist | |
| 2004 | Jessica Molaskey: Make Believe | Vocalist | |
| 2005 | Michael Feinstein Presents: B.J. Ward Sings Marshall Barer | Vocalist/Vocal Engineer | |
| 2005 | The Light in the Piazza: Original Broadway Cast Recording | Composer/Lyricist | Also sings on bonus tracks: "Dividing Day (Demo)" and "Love to Me (Demo)" |

=== Producer ===
| Year | Title | Role | Notes |
|---|---|---|---|
| 2023 | Days of Wine and Roses: Original Cast Recording | Composer/Lyricist/Producer | Co-Produced with Lawrence Manchester and Jamie Lawrence |
| 2025 | Once Upon a Mattress: Broadway Cast Recording | Producer | Co-Produced with Lawrence Manchester, Amy Sherman Palladino, Mary-Mitchell Cambell, and Jenny Gersten |
| 2025 | Floyd Collins: Original Broadway Cast Recording | Composer/Lyricist | Co-Produced with Lawrence Manchester and Ted Sperling |

=== Instrumentalist/other ===
| Year | Title | Role | Notes |
|---|---|---|---|
| 1985 | Song & Dance: Original Broadway Cast Recording | Bassist | Assisted John Mauceri on the Broadway Production |
| 1992 | Ridiculous Theatrical Company 25th Anniversary | Engineer | |
| 1992 | Duke Ellington's Pousse-Cafe | Bassist | |
| 1994 | Ellis Larkin Plays | Bassist | |
| 1997 | Floyd Collins: Original Cast Recording | Composer/Lyricist/Guitar | |
| 2005 | Michael Feinstein Presents: B.J. Ward Sings Marshall Barer | Vocalist/Vocal Engineer | |

== Major works ==
=== Theatre ===
Music and lyrics

| Year | Title | Venue | Ref. |
|---|---|---|---|
| 1996 | Floyd Collins | Playwrights Horizons, Off-Broadway; Vivian Beaumont Theater, Broadway (2025) | |
| 1998 | Myths and Hymns (aka Saturn Returns) | The Public Theater | |
| 2005 | The Light in the Piazza | Vivian Beaumont Theater, Broadway; New York City Center (2023) | |
| 2006 | The Princess Bride | Hollywood Bowl | |
| 2024 | Days of Wine and Roses | Studio 54, Broadway | |
| 2025 | Millions | Alliance Theatre | |

=== Film ===
| Year | Title | Role | Notes |
|---|---|---|---|
| 1993 | Jack: The Last Kennedy Film | Composer | Fox Documentary |
| 1997 | Arguing the World | Composer | PBS Documentary |
| 2011 | The Legacy Project: In Conversation with Stephen Sondheim | Himself | Dramatists Guild Foundation Documentary |
| 2016 | Best Worst Thing That Ever Could Have Happened | Himself | Documentary |

=== Television ===
| Year | Title | Role | Notes |
|---|---|---|---|
| 2006 | Live from Lincoln Center | Composer | Episode: "The Light in the Piazza" |
| 2006 | The Music of Regret | Singer | Short film starring Meryl Streep |
| 2011 | The Miraculous Year | Composer | Television movie |

Other projects

- After contractual negotiations for The Princess Bride failed between Guettel and Goldman, the show was scrapped.
- Guettel has also been reported to be working on several other pieces, including an opera based on the works of Washington Irving and a musical based on H. G. Wells's The Invisible Man.

== Awards and nominations ==
| Year | Association | Category | Project | Result | Ref. |
|---|---|---|---|---|---|
| 2005 | Tony Awards | Best Original Score | The Light in the Piazza | Won | |
| 2005 | Tony Awards | Best Orchestrations | The Light in the Piazza | Won | |
| 2019 | Tony Awards | Best Original Score | To Kill a Mockingbird | Nominated | |
| 2024 | Tony Awards | Best Original Score | Days of Wine and Roses | Nominated | |
| 2025 | Tony Awards | Best Revival of a Musical | Floyd Collins | Nominated | |
| 1996 | Drama Desk Awards | Outstanding Music | Floyd Collins | Nominated | |
| 1996 | Drama Desk Awards | Outstanding Orchestrations | Floyd Collins | Nominated | |
| 2005 | Drama Desk Awards | Outstanding Music | The Light in the Piazza | Won | |
| 2005 | Drama Desk Awards | Outstanding Lyrics | The Light in the Piazza | Won | |
| 2024 | Outer Critics Circle Awards | Outstanding Score | Days of Wine and Roses | Nominated | |
| 2024 | Outer Critics Circle Awards | Outstanding Orchestrations | Days of Wine and Roses | Nominated | |
| 1990 | Stephen Sondheim Award | | | Won | |
| 1997 | ASCAP New Horizons Award | | | Won | |
| 2005 | The American Composers Orchestra Award | | | Won | |
| 2024 | The Frederick Loewe Award | Achievement in a Theatrical Score | Days of Wine and Roses | Won | |
