= Glenn Allen =

Glenn Allen may refer to:

- Glenn Allen Jr. (born 1970), racing driver and co-owner of Allen-Hock Motorsports
- Glenn Seven Allen, American actor and operatic tenor

== See also ==
- Glen Allen (disambiguation)
- Glennallen, Alaska
