= Days of Wine and Roses (musical) =

2023 musical based on the 1962 film

- The Musical
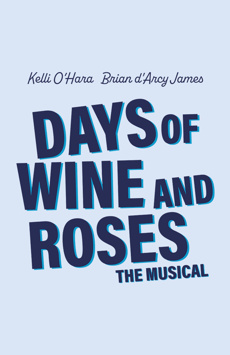
- Broadway Promotional Poster
- Music: Adam Guettel
- Lyrics: Adam Guettel
- Book: Craig Lucas
- Basis: Days of Wine and Roses screenplay by: JP Miller; Days of Wine and Roses teleplay; by JP Miller
- Premiere: May 5, 2023: Linda Gross Theater
- Productions: 2023 Off-Broadway; 2024 Broadway

Days of Wine and Roses is a 2023 stage musical with music and lyrics by Adam Guettel and a book by Craig Lucas, adapted from the 1962 film and 1958 teleplay of the same name.

The musical premiered Off-Broadway in May 2023 to highly positive reviews, starring Kelli O'Hara and Brian d'Arcy James, with direction by Michael Greif. A Broadway transfer opened in January 2024 with O'Hara, James, and Greif returning.

The plot follows Kirsten Arnesen and Joe Clay, a young couple who marry after he introduces her to social drinking. As years pass, their habit grows, and alcoholism plunges them into trouble and turmoil. Joe eventually gets sober and tries to help Kirsten from her self-destruction.

== Origins ==
Kelli O'Hara previously worked with Adam Guettel on The Light in the Piazza, during which time they began conceiving a stage musical version of JP Miller's Days of Wine and Roses. The original television and film versions were critically acclaimed at their release for their realistic portrayal of alcohol abuse. Miller had adapted his screenplay previously as a straight play which had been available for licensing for many years. During the COVID-19 pandemic, work on the musical was finished after being developed for over a decade.

The title comes from a poem by the English writer Ernest Dowson (1867–1900):

They are not long, the days of wine and roses:
Out of a misty dream
Our path emerges for a while, then closes
Within a dream.

== Production history ==
=== Off-Broadway (2023) ===
The show debuted in New York at Atlantic Theater Company's Linda Gross Theater. in 2023, with previews beginning on May 5 and a premiere on June 5. It ran for a limited engagement through July 16. It is directed by Michael Greif with choreography by Sergio Trujillo and Karla Puno Garcia. The production also features scenic design by Lizzie Clachan, costumes by Dede Ayite, lighting by Ben Stanton, sound by Kai Harada, hair & make-up design by David Brian Brown and orchestrations by Guettel and Jamie Lawrence.

On July 25, it was announced that the production had made a cast recording. The cast recording was released digitally on December 15.

=== Broadway (2024) ===
The musical's transfer to Broadway was announced on September 13, 2023. The production began previews on January 6, 2024, with an official opening on January 28. The show was scheduled for a sixteen-week limited run at Studio 54. O'Hara and Brian d'Arcy James reprised their roles in the Broadway production, as well as the entire original production team. Olivia Hernandez, Byron Jennings, Bill English, David Jennings, and Sharon Catherine Brown reprised their respective roles from Off-Broadway with Tony Carlin and Tabitha Lawing joining the company for the transfer.

Due to low ticket sales and attendance, the production closed 4 weeks early on March 31, 2024.

== Synopsis ==
The following is taken from the Days of Wine and Roses CD pamphlet

Joe Clay, public relations man and Korean War Veteran, meets lovely secretary Kirsten Arnesen, daughter of Norwegian immigrant farmers, at an office party (“Magic Time”). He’s buzzed. She’s first bemused, then game. Part of what drives their click (“The Story of the Atlantic Cable”) is that Joe introduces Kirsten to alcohol. A farm girl from a chilly upbringing intrigued by her new life in the city, she takes to drink immediately (“There Go I”) and she and Joe connect exuberantly through it (“Evanesce”). They marry. And during her pregnancy and the early months with their daughter, Lila, Kirsten is happy and sober (“Sammen i Himmelin”). Kirsten only abstains briefly, though, before joining Joe in the bottle (“As the Water Loves the Stone”).

Joe’s drinking gets him demoted to an account in Houston, away from his family. Both keep drinking alone, nevertheless (“Are You Blue?”), and one night Kirsten, taking care of Lila alone (“Underdeath”), passes out with a lit cigarette and nearly burns down their apartment building. Joe and Kirsten quit drinking and move in with Kirsten’s austere father on the farm where she had grown up, relieved to be healthy again (“First Breath”). But Joe has smuggled in alcohol, with a spare bottle hidden in Arneson’s greenhouse, ending up in a drunk ward (“435”).

They now move back to the city, and Joe begins working with Jim Hungerford, his sponsor in Alcoholics Anonymous (“Forgiveness”). But that night on her father’s farm, Kirsten had also begun to drink again, and her morning-after take on the matter is different from Joe’s. The only happiness she has known are the early years of their marriage, which included drinking. Joe’s association with A. A. feels like a shaming (“Morton Salt Girl”). She leaves on an open-ended bender, hoping but struggling to rejoin being a mother to Lila, as Lila hopes for her mother’s return (“The Letters”). Kirsten manages to put together five days without alcohol (“Forgiveness (Reprise)”). Joe and Lila nurse a wan hope that Kirsten will eventually rejoin them (“Lila Hangs the Moon”), but the best Kirsten can do is stop by briefly to leave Lila a present (“There Go I (Reprise)”). “The world looks so dirty to me when I’m not drinking,” she pleads – and with this ends the story of Kirsten and Joe.

== Musical numbers ==
- "Magic Time" – Joe
- "The Story of the Atlantic Cable" – Kirsten
- "There Go I" – Kirsten
- "Evanesce" – Joe, Kirsten
- "Sammen i Himmelen" – Kirsten
- "As the Water Loves the Stone" – Joe, Kirsten
- "Are You Blue" – Kirsten
- "Underdeath" – Kirsten
- "First Breath" – Kirsten, Lila
- "Evanesce (Reprise)" – Joe, Kirsten +
- "435" – Joe
- "Morton Salt Girl" – Kirsten
- "Forgiveness" – Joe
- "As the Water Loves the Stone (Reprise)" – Kirsten, Joe +
- "Letters" – Kirsten, Lila
- "Forgiveness (Reprise)" – Kirsten
- "Sammen I himmelen (Reprise)" – Joe, Lila +
- "There Go I (Reprise)" – Joe, Kirsten

Note: + Not included on the 2023 Original Cast Album

== Characters and original casts ==
Character	Off-Broadway	Broadway
Character	2023	2024
Kirsten Arnesen	Kelli O'Hara	Kelli O'Hara
Joe Clay	Brian d'Arcy James	Brian d'Arcy James
Betty	Olivia Hernandez	Olivia Hernandez
Rad Leland	Ted Koch	Tony Carlin
Ellis Arnesen	Byron Jennings	Byron Jennings
Lila Clay	Ella Dane Morgan	Tabitha Lawing
Mr. Shaw	Bill English	Bill English
Jim Hungerford	David Jennings	David Jennings
Mrs. Nolan	Sharon Catherine Brown	Sharon Catherine Brown

=== Notable replacements ===
- Off-Broadway (2023)
  - Kirsten Arnesen: Elena Shaddow
- Broadway (2024)
  - Joe Clay: Bill English (u/s)

== Awards and nominations ==
=== 2024 Broadway production ===
Year	Award	Category	Nominee	Result	Ref.
2024	Tony Awards	Best Original Score (Music and/or Lyrics) Written for the Theatre	Adam Guettel	Nominated	
2024	Tony Awards	Best Actor in a Musical	Brian d'Arcy James	Nominated	
2024	Tony Awards	Best Actress in a Musical	Kelli O'Hara	Nominated	
2024	Drama Desk Awards	Outstanding Lead Performer in a Musical	Brian d'Arcy James	Won	
2024	Drama Desk Awards	Outstanding Lead Performer in a Musical	Kelli O'Hara	Won	
2024	Drama League Awards	Distinguished Performance	Kelli O’Hara	Nominated	
2024	Outer Critics Circle Awards	Outstanding New Broadway Musical		Nominated	
2024	Outer Critics Circle Awards	Outstanding Lead Performer in a Broadway Musical	Brian d’Arcy James	Nominated	
2024	Outer Critics Circle Awards	Outstanding Lead Performer in a Broadway Musical	Kelli O’Hara	Won	
2024	Outer Critics Circle Awards	Outstanding New Score	Adam Guettel	Nominated	
2024	Outer Critics Circle Awards	Outstanding Orchestrations	Adam Guettel and Jamie Lawrence	Nominated	
2024	Outer Critics Circle Awards	Outstanding Direction of a Musical	Michael Greif	Nominated	
