= Elena Shaddow =

American singer and actress

Elena Shaddow is an American singer and actress. She is originally from Chagrin Falls, Ohio.

== Biography ==
Shaddow attended New York University, graduating with a music degree.

She has performed on Broadway, Off-Broadway, regionally, in national tours, and in London.

Her Broadway credits include Les Misérables, Sweet Smell of Success, Nine, Fiddler on the Roof, The Woman in White and The Visit.

She has performed twice at the Tony Awards, on The Today Show, and on The Rosie O'Donnell Show. She can be heard on the recordings of Illyria, Carols for a Cure, the new Broadway cast recording of Nine, the original cast recording of The Water Coolers, and on the original cast recording of Sweet Smell of Success.

She has been nominated twice for a Helen Hayes Award for Best Actress, once for her work in Senor Discretion Himself at Arena Stage (2005) and once for the national tour of The Light in the Piazza (2007, Outstanding Lead Actress, Non-Resident Production).

She starred as Anne Dindon in the 2010 Tony-winning revival of La Cage aux Folles in 2010–2011. In August 2013, she was in the world premiere of Jason Robert Brown's new musical, The Bridges of Madison County at the Williamstown Theatre Festival, starring alongside Steven Pasquale. In March 2022, she revisited The Light in the Piazza for a concert at London's Alexandra Palace Theatre, playing the role of Margaret – fifteen years after playing Margaret's daughter Clara on stage in the 2006–2007 U.S. national tour.

=== Tours ===
She toured as Clara Johnson in Adam Guettel's The Light in the Piazza in the 2006 US national tour before leaving in 2007 and being replaced by Katie Rose Clarke. She toured as Anna in the US tour of the Lincoln Center production of The King and I in 2018.

== Personal ==
Shaddow and Michael Harrington were married on October 24, 2004. The two met as students at New York University. Their child, a girl was born in 2008. They have a second child, a boy, born in 2011.

== Career ==
Broadway

Source: Playbill

- Cosette in Les Misérables (2001)
- Susan in Sweet Smell of Success (2002)
- Claudia in Nine (2003)
- Hodel in Fiddler on the Roof (2004)
- Laura Fairlie in The Woman in White (2005)
- Anne Dindon in La Cage aux Folles (April 6, 2010 – April 4, 2011)
- Ottilie Schell in The Visit (2015)

National Tour

- Clara in The Light in the Piazza (Helen Hayes Award Nomination) (2006–2007)
- Anna in The King and I (2018)

London

- Magnolia in Show Boat at Royal Albert Hall (2006)
- Margaret in The Light in the Piazza (2022) [Concert]

Off-Broadway

- Brooke in The Water Coolers (2002)
- Kirsten Arnesen in Days of Wine and Roses (2023)

Regional

- Sara Brown in Guys and Dolls at Bucks County Playhouse (2017)
- Cinderella in Into the Woods at The Muny (2015)
- Francesca Johnson in The Bridges of Madison County at Williamstown Theatre Festival (2013)
- Maria in The Sound of Music at Paper Mill Playhouse (2012)
- Lili in Carnival! at Paper Mill Playhouse
- Cecily in The Importance of Being Earnest at Shakespeare Theatre of New Jersey
- Hodel in Fiddler on the Roof at North Carolina Theatre
- Viola in Illyria at Shakespeare Theatre of New Jersey (2004)
- Lupita in Senor Discretion Himself (World Premiere) at Arena Stage (Helen Hayes Award Nom.)
- Eliza Doolittle in My Fair Lady at North Carolina Theatre (2004)
- Maria in West Side Story at North Shore Music Theatre (2003)
- Meg in A Christmas Carol at North Shore Music Theatre
- Kathie in The Student Prince at North Shore Music Theatre

Readings/Workshops

- Grazia in Death Takes a Holiday (Maury Yeston, composer)
- Lupita in Senor Discretion Himself
- Jaz in Jaz (a one-woman play)
- Edmee in Cheri (the opera) (Original Cast)
- Christine in Love Never Dies

Concert

- Maury Yeston's December Songs, The Encore
- The West Side Story Suites, Albany Symphony Orchestra
- Gloria (Poulenc), Cleveland Orchestra
- Chichester Psalms (Bernstein), Cleveland Orchestra
- Margaret in The Light in the Piazza (2022), Alexandra Palace Theatre, London

University (NYU Steinhardt)

- Sarah Brown in Guys and Dolls
- Maria in West Side Story
- Our Time (Premiere)
- Nora in Riders to the Sea
- Brigadoon
- The Memory of All That... Requiem
- From May to December
- The Happy Prince
