= Glen Allen =

Glen Allen, Glen Allan, or similar, may refer to:

== Places ==
- Glen Allyn, Queensland, Australia
- Glen Allan, Ontario, Canada; see Conestogo Lake
- Glen Allen, Alabama, U.S.
- Glen Allan, Mississippi, U.S.
- Glen Allen, Missouri, U.S.
- Glen Allen, Virginia, U.S.
  - Glen Allen High School
- Glennallen, Alaska, U.S.

== People ==
- Glenn Allen Jr. (born 1970), U.S. autoracer
- Glenn Seven Allen, American actor and operatic tenor
- Glen Alyn (1913–1984), Australian actress
- Glenallen Hill (born 1965), U.S. professional baseball player

== See also ==
- Glen Ellen, California, U.S.
- Glen Ellyn, Illinois, U.S.
