= Grand 1894 Opera House =

- Grand Opera House
- U.S. National Register of Historic Places
- Recorded Texas Historic Landmark
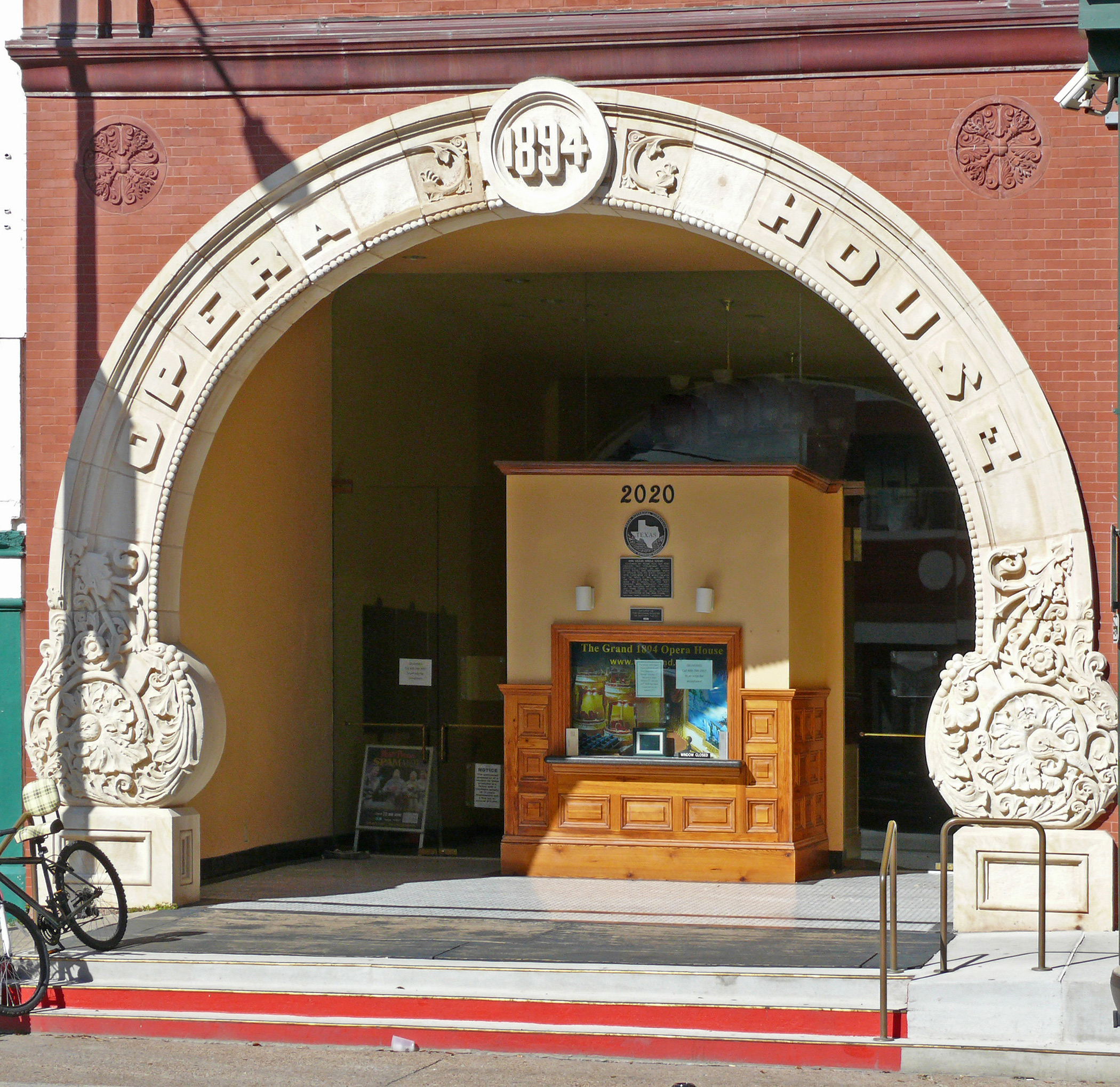
- Opera House entrance in 2012

- Location within Texas Location within the United States
- Location: 2020 Postoffice St. (Ave. E), Galveston, Texas
- Coordinates: 29°17′47″N 94°47′26″W
- Area: 1 acre (0.40 ha)
- Built: 1895
- Built by: Barnes & Palliser
- Architect: Frank Cox
- Architectural style: Romanesque
- Website: The Grand 1894 Opera House
- NRHP reference No.: 74002071
- RTHL No.: 7478

Significant dates
- Added to NRHP: January 2, 1974
- Designated RTHL: 1990

The Grand 1894 Opera House in Galveston, Texas is currently operated as a not-for-profit performing arts theatre. The Romanesque Revival style Opera House is located at 2020 Post Office Street in Galveston's Historic Downtown Cultural Arts District. It was named "The Official Opera House of Texas" in 1993 by the 73rd Texas Legislature. It has a seating capacity of 1,040.

== History ==
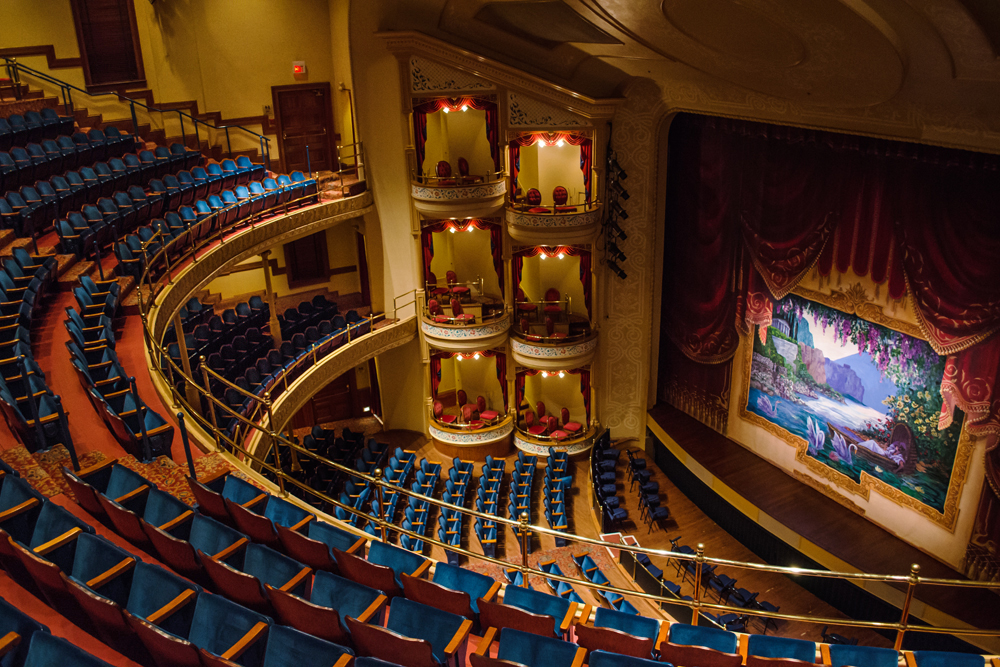
From the upper balcony of the Grand Opera House

In 1894, Henry Greenwall closed his Tremont Opera House at 23rd and Market Streets and raised money for the construction of a new opera house on Post Office Street. In 1894, Henry Greenwall (often spelled Greenwald) raised $100,000 for construction of The Grand Opera House and Hotel in Galveston. It opened on January 3, 1895 with a live performance of the play, The Daughters of Eve.

The Grand has stood through notable hurricanes, including the Galveston Hurricane of 1900, Galveston Hurricane of 1915, Hurricane Carla, and Hurricane Ike. The Grand began as a major, live performing arts theatre but after passing through a Vaudeville phase, it slowly evolved into a movie house. The movie house closed in 1974 and was purchased the same year by the Galveston County Cultural Arts Council. They transformed the movie house back into a theatre and then renovated and restored it to its former beauty. The restoration included volunteer efforts and support from private foundations. The theatre was listed in the National Register of Historic Places as "1894 Grand Opera House" in 1974. The Galveston County Cultural Arts Council owned the Opera House until 1986, when it became a stand-alone organization known as 1894, Inc. Maureen M. Patton is The Grand's Executive Director, having served as Director under the Arts Council beginning in 1981. Hurricane Ike hit Galveston Island on September 13, 2008, but The Grand was reopened on January 3, 2009 on its 114th anniversary. All of the damage that the hurricane and the flood had caused was repaired with only 92 days of construction.

== Notable Performers ==
- Maude Adams
- Gracie Allen
- Paul Anka
- The Beach Boys
- Tony Bennett
- Sarah Bernhardt
- William Jennings Bryan
- George Burns
- Ray Charles
- George M. Cohan
- Larry Gatlin and the Gatlin Brothers
- Eydie Gormé
- Helen Hayes
- Lionel Hampton
- Hal Holbrook
- Marilyn Horne
- James Earl Jones
- Dorothy Kirsten
- Steve Lawrence
- Cloris Leachman
- Lyle Lovett
- The Marx Brothers
- Johnny Mathis
- Maureen McGovern
- Liza Minnelli
- Madame Modjeska
- Willie Nelson
- The Oak Ridge Boys
- Ignace Paderewski
- Anna Pavlova
- Itzhak Perlman
- Bernadette Peters
- Lillian Russell
- Otis Skinner
- John Philip Sousa
- Tommy Tune
- Vienna Choir Boys

The Grand also has been the presenter of several premieres: Red White & Tuna and Tuna Does Vegas, two of four comedic plays written and performed by Greater Tuna creators, Jaston Williams and Joe Sears; and ANN, a one-woman play about the life of Texas Governor Ann Richards, written and performed by Holland Taylor.

The music video for the Mötley Crüe song "Without You" was filmed at the Grand on January 15, 1990 after their stop in Houston the previous night.

== Architecture ==
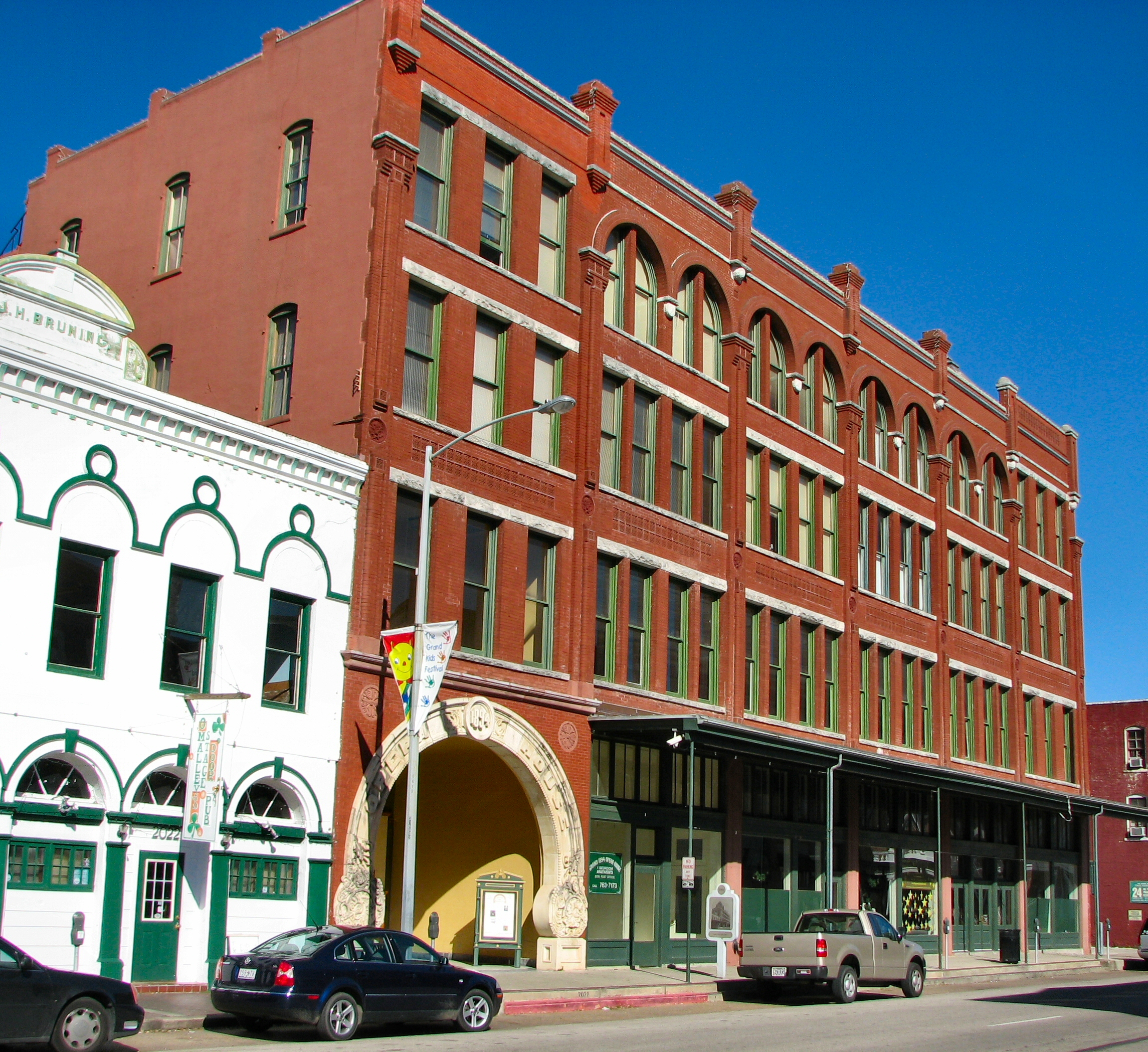

"When it opened in 1895, the 70' x 37' x 69' stage was the largest in the state of Texas and one of the largest in the country... Even today, a stage whisper can be heard without a microphone, and no seat is more than 70 feet from the stage."

The Grand has been through natural disasters, such as fires and hurricanes, as well as neglect during its time as a movie house. It has been rebuilt and remodeled more than once, such as during the devastating Galveston Hurricane of 1900, when its rear wall and roof caved in.

The front wall of the building is made of red stone, brick, and terra cotta; the large, glass doors are framed by a carved, Romanesque style stone arch. Inside, the glass box office sits in between the two sets of doors. The carpet is a historic pattern of colors found in the decorative curtain and stenciling of roses and scrolls on the ceiling and boxes. The floors are marble tile, and the walls are wainscot. The banisters and railings are of long leaf red-heart pine, like the wainscot. A large, bronze statue of a woman holding a torch stands on the newel post on The Grand staircase. Inside the theater auditorium, red, velvet curtains frame the stage and eight opera boxes. Blue velour lines the chairs. The stage curtain (originally painted by architect Frank Cox) is a replication of the original, depicting “Sappho and Companions”.

== See also ==
- National Register of Historic Places listings in Galveston County, Texas
- Recorded Texas Historic Landmarks in Galveston County

== Bibliography ==
- Beasley, Ellen; Fox, Stephen (1996). Galveston Architectural Guidebook. Houston: Rice University Press. ISBN 0-89263-345-X.
