= Sarah Uriarte Berry =

American actress and singer (born 1969)

- Born: Sarah Uriarte; May 31, 1969 (age 57); San Francisco, California
- Occupations: Actress, singer
- Years active: 1987–present

Sarah Uriarte Berry (born May 31, 1969 in San Francisco, California) is an American actress and singer.

== Career ==
Berry is a native of California and graduated from UCLA in 1992. She made her Broadway debut as Eponine in Les Misérables in 1993. She then went on to star as Belle in Beauty and the Beast in 1995. Berry then returned to the role of Eponine in Les Misérables in 1997. She appeared in the short-lived Taboo from October 2003 to February 2004 and The Light in the Piazza (2005) as "Franca", for which she was nominated for Drama Desk and Outer Critics Circle Awards as Outstanding Featured Actress in a Musical. She also starred as the title role in Cinderella alongside Eartha Kitt for the New York City Opera in 2004. On September 19, 2006, she returned to the role of Belle in Beauty and the Beast and left the show on December 24, 2006.

Berry's national tours include Sunset Boulevard as Betty Schaefer and starring Petula Clark (1998–1999) and Carousel, in which she portrayed Julie Jordan. Her regional theatre credits include A Little Night Music as Anne at the Kennedy Center in 2002,The Sound of Music at the Helen Hayes Theatre Company, Nyack, New York in 2002,Oklahoma! at the Sacramento Music Circus (July 27 – August 1, 2004), West Side Story at The Muny in St. Louis in June 2000, and Thoroughly Modern Millie, at the LaJolla Playhouse, California (2000).

Berry reprised her role as Franca in a production of The Light in the Piazza which ran from July 10–26, 2008 at the Weston Playhouse Theatre in Weston, Vermont, where she starred alongside her husband Michael, who played Roy. She also starred as Sharon in the Paper Mill Playhouse production of Master Class which ran from March 4 – April 5, 2009. Berry was a temporary standby for Alice Ripley in the role of Diana in Next to Normal on Broadway. She went on with her husband as Dan on February 19, 2010. Berry starred as Magnolia with her daughter, Madeleine, as Young Kim in the Goodspeed Opera House production of Show Boat, which ran from July to September 2011. In October 2022, Berry took part in the Disney Princess – The Concert tour after Susan Egan could not continue performing after being diagnosed Bell's Palsy. In April and May of 2023, she played the role of Countess Charlotte Malcolm in a revival of A Little Night Music at the Pasadena Playhouse. Afterwards, Berry then starred as Glinda in Musical Theatre West's 2023 production of The Wizard of Oz.

== Personal ==
Berry is married to Broadway actor and director Michael Berry. They have one daughter and twin sons.
