= Covina Center for the Performing Arts =

Theater in Covina, California, United States

Coordinates: 34°5′11″N 117°53′25″W

- Covina Center; Covina Theater
- Location in Los Angeles Location in California Location in United States
- Former names: Covina Theater
- Address: 104 N Citrus Ave; Covina, California; United States
- Owner: The Champion Foundation
- Operator: Covina Center
- Type: Cinema
- Current use: Movie premiers; Theater

Construction
- Built: 1920; 106 years ago
- Opened: 1920 (as Covina Theater)
- Renovated: 2004; October 2005
- Closed: 2020 (temporarily due to Covid-19)
- Reopened: TBA
- Years active: 1920–2004; 2005–Present
- Architect: Frank Cox

Tenant
- Covina Center for the Performing arts

Website
- www.covinacenter.com

The Covina Center for the Performing Arts is an historic theater located in Covina, California, dedicated to the advancement of theatre.

== History ==
The original Covina Theater was built in 1920 in the Reed building at the corner of Citrus and Badillo and was a downtown Covina staple for entertainment. It was a modern theater for its time, designed by architect Frank Cox They played two films nightly: first the newsreel, and then a silent film, accompanied by the piano. Saturday matinées showed the serials that were so popular at the time. The theater became a hot spot for many Covina youth when “The Candy Box” opened in the same building, just before Christmas 1921. With the advent of color movies in the 1930s, the theater was remodeled and continued to bring entertainment to the city of Covina. The second floor of the theater was removed and the Masonic Lodge that had been there was closed to add more space for a larger balcony section. In 1948, the whole building was again remodeled to add structural strength in case of an earthquake. With the addition of sound to film, once again new renovations were made to the theater, and The Candy Box moved out. Business boomed and the theater thrived. In the 1950s the theater continued to be remodeled to suit the needs of its patrons and the entertainment medium they presented. In 1961 the theater's marquee was added. It wasn't until 1984 that the building was used by a theatrical company, the West Covina Players. They moved into the theater after it had been dark for a year. In June 1993, the West Covina Players opened their season at their new location with the musical classic, “Fiddler on the Roof”, and transformed the old Covina Theater into the new Covina Valley Playhouse. They continued operating out of this facility until the closing production of Kander & Ebb’s “Cabaret”.

== Today ==
Beginning in 2004, renovation on the Covina Theater resumed again. Much of the former theater building and the original sign were torn down in 2005. The initial plan was to restore the building into a performing arts theater. This was before unforeseen issues with the building's structure were uncovered during the original restoration work. Unfortunately, the building was deemed structurally unsound, so the building was rebuilt instead. The new Covina Center for the Performing Arts (CCPA) opened to the public in October 2007. This breathtaking facility has become the cultural hub of the San Gabriel Valley, and is quickly becoming a force in the Southern California theater scene. Operating under the Actors' Equity Association's 99 Seat Plan, the Covina Center for the Performing Arts produces upwards of a half dozen equity shows annually.

CCPA 2008 Charter Season
Celebration of the Arts
Kiss Me, Kate
Neil Simon's The Odd Couple
Enter the Guardsman
Seussical the Musical
Gypsy: A Musical Fable
Wait Until Dark
An Adaptation of A Christmas Carol

CCPA 2009 Season
The Light in the Piazza
Neil Simon's Barefoot in the Park
Festival of New American Musicals
Godspell
HMS Pinafore in concert

In addition, there is a special events season, which includes performances by Jason Robert Brown and Fritz Coleman, the musical revues Not Fade Away and In the Mood, and the play Latinologues.

== Educational programming ==
According to the Covina Center for the Performing Arts, the Center is committed to bringing the highest level of theatrical education to the children of the San Gabriel Valley and surrounding areas. The Covina Center claims that through the highest level of performance-based instruction, free or low cost performances, unique backstage tours, internships/apprenticeships, and support for classroom teachers, the Covina Center for the Performing Arts is dedicated to promoting the performing arts and to being a positive, active influence in creating the next generation of performers, designers, and arts administrators, as well theatre enthusiasts and future patrons.
