= Myths and Hymns =

- Nonesuch Records album cover art
- Music: Adam Guettel
- Lyrics: Adam Guettel
- Premiere: March 24th, 1998: The Public Theater

Myths and Hymns (originally known as Saturn Returns) is a song cycle by composer Adam Guettel, based on Greek myth and lyrics found in an antique hymnal. Guettel's second major work, the song-cycle was originally produced by the Public Theater. The song cycle is structured as a revue, with no through plot. Performed in concert format, it concerns the relationship of humans to gods, past and present.

== Production History ==
While workshopping the Myths and Hymns at the Public Theater, Associate Producer, Wiley Hausman said "when you meet somebody as talented as Adam Guettel, you just say 'is that what you wanna do? we'll do it'. You just support it". Guettel reported feeling immense pressure on himself while working on the workshop, saying he "so want(ed) it to work)". Guettel also saw the score as a valuable learning experience.

=== Off-Broadway ===
Myths and Hymns was first performed Off-Broadway, under the title Saturn Returns, at the Public Theater on March 31, 1998 and closed on April 26, 1998 after 16 performances. It was directed by Tina Landau with a cast of 6 performers that included Annie Golden, Vivian Cherry, Theresa McCarthy, Lawrence Clayton, Jose Llana and Bob Stillman.

=== European Premiere ===
The show had its European premiere at the Finborough Theatre, London, on 22 April 2007, and was scheduled to run a further two performances on 29 April and 6 May. Due to popular demand the show was scheduled for two further performances on 30 April and 7 May. Directed by Tom Cooper, and with musical direction from Joe Hood, the cast featured Leon Craig, Ashleigh Gray, Hazel Holder, Craig Purnell, David Randall, and Caroline Sheen.

"... This is musical theatre that is challenging, compelling and compulsive... there is an astonishing intelligence and physicality throughout... bring yourself to it - as the fiercely committed cast of Tom Cooper’s production do - and it one of the most rewarding experiences you can have..." Mark Shenton, "The Stage"

Song list

The show's order followed that of the score rather than the recording:

- Prometheus
- Saturn Returns
- Icarus
- Migratory V
- Pegasus
- Jesus the Mighty Conqueror
- Children of the Heavenly King
- At the Sounding
- Build a Bridge
- Sisyphus
- Life is but a Dream
- Link
- Hero & Leander
- Come to Jesus
- How Can I Lose You?
- Awaiting You
- The Great Highway
- There's a Land
- Saturn Returns (Reprise)

=== Prospect Theater Production ===
The song cycle received its first narrative treatment, written and directed by Elizabeth Lucas (Clear Blue Tuesday), in February 2012 at Prospect Theater in New York City.

=== Mastervoices Streaming Production ===
During the COVID-19 pandemic, Ted Sperling led the production of a streaming version of the show, with Mastervoices. The production originally streamed in four parts, with performers filming their solos from home. Soloists included Renee Fleming, Kelli O'Hara, Dove Cameron, and original off-broadway cast member, Theresa McCarthy.

== Concept ==
The title Saturn Returns refers to Saturn's 29-year cycle around the sun, which is considered a time of reassessment. Many of the songs Guettel wrote were adapted from Greek myths and a hymnal he found in a used bookstore. Guettel says he "used these dissimilar cosmologies as points of departure and discovered as (he) went along that they have a lot in common- a desire to transcend earthly bounds, to bond with something or someone greater".

== Song list ==
A cast recording was released by Nonesuch on March 30, 1999. The performers on the recording include the off-Broadway cast, and also include others who were not in that production. Performers include: Adam Guettel, Audra McDonald, Mandy Patinkin, Kristin Chenoweth, Vivian Cherry, Billy Porter and Theresa McCarthy.

Songs on the recording in its final form:

- Children of the Heavenly King
- At the Sounding
- Saturn Returns
- Icarus
- Migratory V
- Link
- Hero and Leander
- Sisyphus
- Come to Jesus
- How Can I Lose You?
- Awaiting You
- The Great Highway
- There's a Land
- Saturn Returns (Reprise)
