= Señor Discretion Himself =

- Music: Frank Loesser
- Lyrics: Frank Loesser
- Book: Frank Loesser and Culture Clash
- Basis: a short story by Budd Schulberg
- Productions: Arena Stage, Washington, D.C. (2004)
- Awards: 2005 Helen Hayes Award Hayes Award (Outstanding Resident Musical)

Señor Discretion Himself is a musical with book, music and lyrics by Frank Loesser, adapted from the short story of the same name by Budd Schulberg. It was never completed before Loesser died in 1969, but it was revised and "completed" in 2004, with a new libretto by Culture Clash, vocal arrangements by Brian Cimmet and directed by Charles Randolph-Wright.

Señor Discretion Himself ran April 9 through May 23, 2004, at Arena Stage in Washington, D.C. The production was directed by Charles Randolph-Wright, choreography by Doriana Sanchez, music direction and vocal arrangements by Brian Cimmet, orchestrations by Larry Hochman. The production starred Shawn Elliott, Elena Shaddow, Ivan Hernandez, Margo Reymundo, and John Bolton.

== Background ==
Frank Loesser worked on what would have been his final musical from 1965 to 1968. Suffering from terminal illness, he ultimately wrote to Budd Schulberg, claiming to have abandoned work on Señor Discretion Himself.

In the 1980s, a developmental workshop was done of the show, for which new arrangements of the music were devised. The libretto was completed by Schulberg, but after the unsuccessful 1985 workshop, the show disappeared back into obscurity.

In 2003, a reading and subsequent workshop were put together in preparation for the 2004 production at Arena Stage.

In 2005, another reading and a demo recording were created.

== 2004 Arena Stage production (world premiere) ==
Cast:

- Pancito - Shawn Elliott
- Hilario - John Bolton
- Lupita - Elena Shaddow
- Martin - Ivan Hernandez
- Carolina - Margo Reymundo
- Father Orlando - Robert Almodovar
- Father Francisco - Tony Chiroldes
- Father Manuel - Carlos Lopez
- Ensemble - Venny Carranza, Steven Cupo, Rayanne Gonzales, Deanna Harris, Laura-Lisa, Lynnette Marrero, Eduardo Placer and Diego Prieto

== Awards and nominations ==
- 2005 Helen Hayes Award – Outstanding Resident Musical
- 2005 Helen Hayes Nomination – Emilio Sosa, Costume Design (Resident Design)
