= Frank Cox (architect) =

American artist and theater architect

Tignal Franklin Cox (1854–1940) was an American artist and theater architect. He worked as a scenic artist, decorator, builder, architect, and developer.

== Biography ==
Cox started his artistic career in the 1880s having painted backdrop curtains for the Opera House in Batavia, New York (1883) and the Academy of Music in Auburn, New York (1884). In 1885 he became the scenic artist for Smith's Opera Houses in Tarrytown, New York, and in Batavia.

He began working as an architect in New Orleans around 1893. He designed the Grand 1894 Opera House in Galveston, Texas.

He relocated to Chicago in 1900. In 1918 he moved to the Los Angeles suburb of Covina in Southern California. He designed the Covina Theatre there for his son-in-law George Leonardy and his nephew Earl Sinks in 1921 (demolished in 2005 because of structural problems and replaced by the Covina Center for the Performing Arts).

He designed more than 50 theaters for the Klaw & Erlanger company. His work includes the New Lyceum Theatre in Atlanta (destroyed by fire in 1901). Existing theaters he designed include the Morton Theatre in Athens, Georgia, Majestic Theatre at Streator, Illinois (1907) and the Grand Opera House in Galveston, Texas. Built for vaudeville, they were readapted as times changed and uses included burlesque shows and movies. Other, now demolished, theaters he designed included the Lyceum Theatre in Memphis, Tennessee and the Hippodrome Theatre in Alton, Illinois
