= Glenn Seven Allen =

American actor and operatic tenor

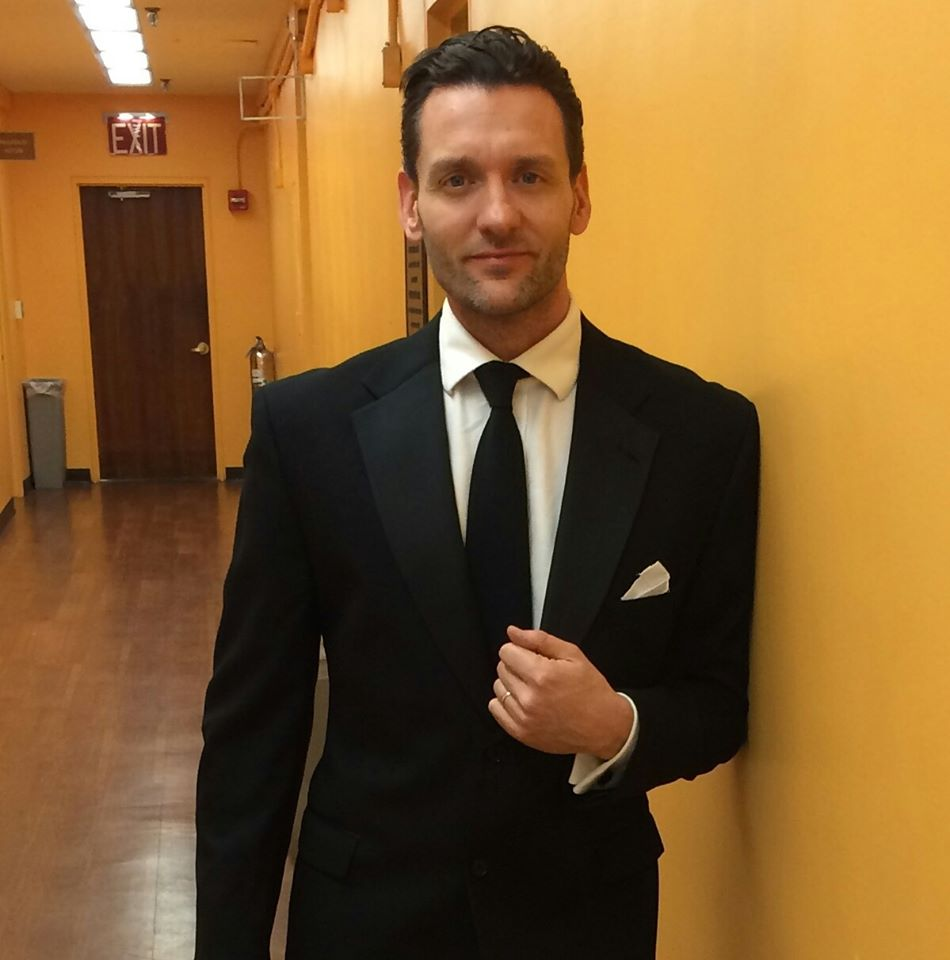
- Born: Atlanta, Georgia
- Education: University of Michigan
- Occupations: Actor, opera singer (tenor)
- Years active: 2000s–present
- Website: www.glennsevenallen.com

Glenn Seven Allen is an American actor and operatic tenor. He performs on Broadway, off-Broadway, and at notable opera venues throughout the United States. In addition to his performing career, Allen currently serves on the Acting Faculty at the Yale School of Drama and the NYU Tisch New Studio on Broadway.

== Career ==
Born in Atlanta, Georgia, Allen made his Broadway debut in the Tony Award winning musical The Light in the Piazza after originating the role of Giuseppe in the first professional productions of the show opposite Kelli O'Hara at both the Intiman Theatre Festival in Seattle and Goodman Theatre in Chicago. He has performed roles at Tony Award-winning theaters, including Old Globe Theatre, Arena Stage, Goodspeed Musicals, Goodman Theatre, Intiman Theatre Festival, Paper Mill Playhouse, and Lincoln Center Theater.

Allen has performed operatic roles at New York City Opera, Carnegie Hall, Alice Tully Hall, Avery Fisher Hall, Symphony Space, and Lincoln Center/Rose Hall. In 2017 he sang the role of The Faun in Respighi's La campana sommersa with New York City Opera at Lincoln Center, the city's first production of the opera since 1929.

Allen is a graduate of the Musical Theater Department of the University of Michigan and the Professional Actor Training Program at the University of Washington. He has been a member of the faculty at Yale University since 2014.

== Discography ==
Year	Album	Conductor, ensemble	Label
2005	Adam Guettel: The Light in the Piazza (Musical)	Ted Sperling	Nonesuch Records
2014	Victor Herbert: Orange Blossoms	Evans Haile, Light Opera of New York	Albany Records
2015	Paul Hindemith: The Long Christmas Dinner	Leon Botstein, American Symphony Orchestra	Bridge Records
