= Lawrence Manchester =

American music producer, Music Mixer

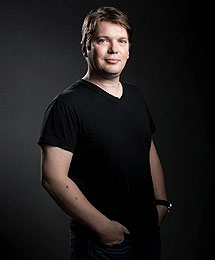
- Born: February 23, 1972 (age 54); Portland, Maine, U.S.

Lawrence Manchester is a four-time Grammy Award winning and one-time Emmy Award-winning music producer, engineer, and mixer based in New York City. Known for his work as music mixer for NBC's The Tonight Show Starring Jimmy Fallon including co-producer of Fallon's Grammy-winning comedy album, Blow Your Pants Off, mixing the award-winning score for The Queen's Gambit, many original Broadway cast albums, and film scores, as well as supervising Camila Cabello's broadcast sound for two Grammy Awards performances, a symphony orchestra for Martin Scorsese's The Departed, tracking vocals with Beyoncé, "Slow Jamming The News” with Barack Obama, and mixing Justin Timberlake and The Roots.

Some of Manchester's film score work includes recording all vocals for Steven Spielberg's 2021 remake of West Side Story, Danny Elfman's score for the film The Woman In The Window (Fox 2020) and (Twentieth Century Fox). Manchester also served as the Supervising Music Producer/Engineer/Mixer for Richard LaGravenese's film adaptation of Jason Robert Brown's musical The Last Five Years (Radius-TWC), starring Anna Kendrick and Jeremy Jordan, of which Variety exclaimed, "the film sounds fantastic".

In addition to his work on The Tonight Show for television, Manchester served as the Post-Audio Mixer for Adele Live in New York City. He has mixed the music for both seasons of the Apple TV+ musical Schmigadoon!, and Danny Elfman's score of the Netflix film, White Noise as well as the television series Smash.

Manchester co-produced the Original Cast Albums of Barry Manilow's 2024 Broadway show Harmony, the Grammy-nominated Original Cast Album for the Broadway hit Something Rotten!, Manchester won two Grammy Awards for his mixing on the Broadway cast album recordings Some Like it Hot, (2023) and Into the Woods (2022). His other notable Broadway cast albums include, A Bronx Tale, The Prom, Head Over Heels, The Cher Show, Summer: The Donna Summer Musical, Spider-Man: Turn Off The Dark, Pippin, and Kiss Me Kate.

Other notable films include Mean Girls, Dear Evan Hansen, I, Tonya, The Girl On The Train, Godless, True Grit, Noelle, Frida, and Across The Universe, and recorded and mixed the studio cast recording of Disney's The Hunchback of Notre Dame.

For more information about Manchester's work, go to: Joe D'Ambrosio Management - Lawrence Manchester

Lawrence holds bachelor's degrees from the Peabody Conservatory of Music, and Johns Hopkins University as well as a master's degree from New York University. He lives in New York City with his wife and two children.
