= Michael Greif =

American stage director (born 1960)

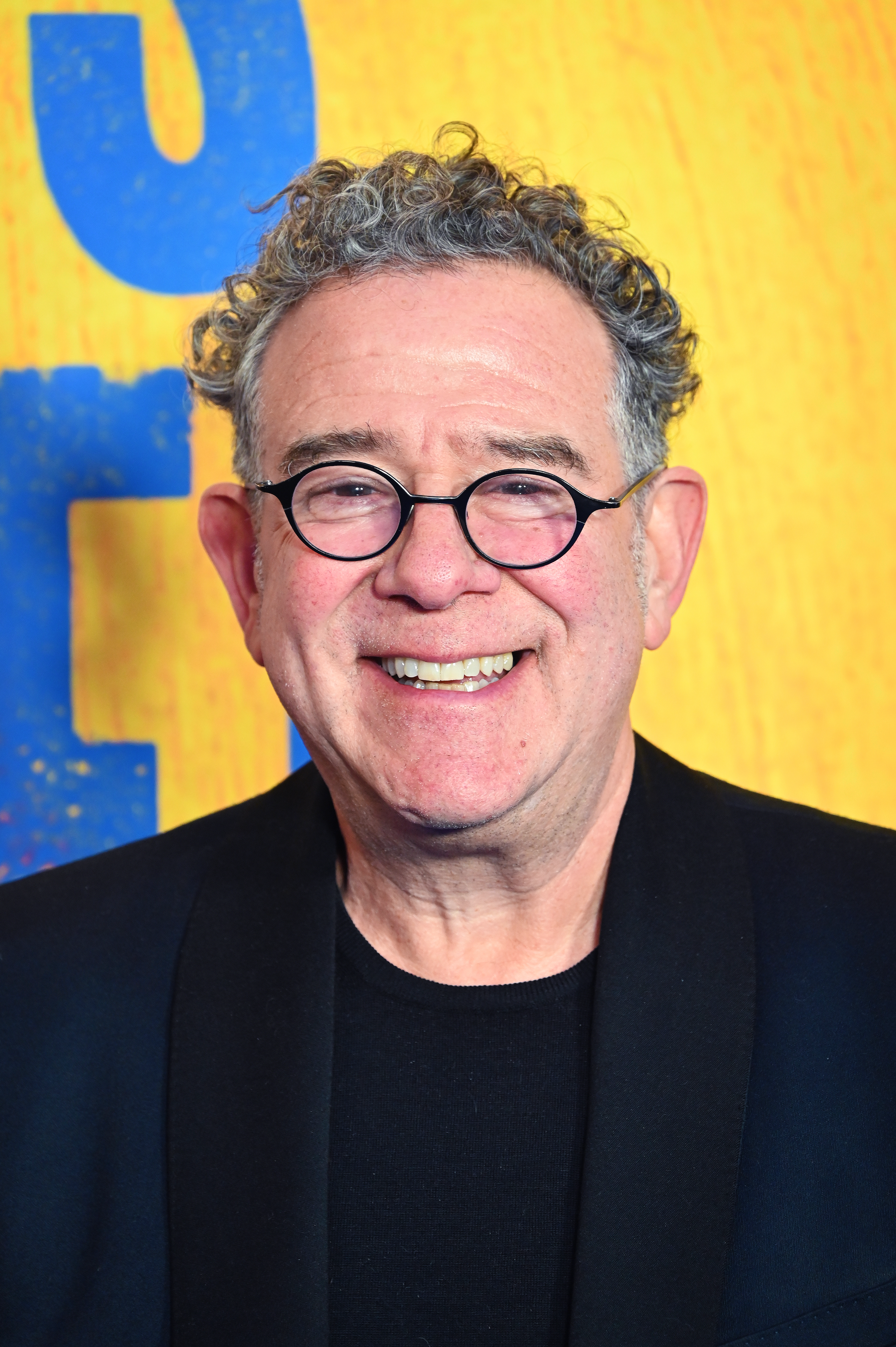
- Greif in 2025
- Born: ca. 1959 (age 66–67); Brooklyn, New York, United States
- Education: Northwestern University (BA); University of California, San Diego (MFA)
- Occupation: Theater director

Michael Greif (born c. 1959, Brooklyn, New York) is an American stage director. He has won three Obie Awards and received five Tony Award nominations, for Rent, Grey Gardens, Next to Normal, Dear Evan Hansen, and Hell's Kitchen.

== Career ==
Greif attended Northwestern University and graduated from the University of California, San Diego graduate directing program. He was the Artistic Director of the La Jolla Playhouse, LaJolla, California from 1994 to 1999.

He was an Artistic Associate at the New York Theatre Workshop where he directed, among others, Bright Lights, Big City (1998–99) and the original production of Rent for which he received the Obie Award for direction of a musical and which he later directed on Broadway.

Greif directed several original Broadway musicals and been nominated for the Tony Award for Best Direction of a Musical four times. In addition to Rent, his Broadway credits include If/Then (also at the National Theatre in Washington, D.C.), Next to Normal (also at Second Stage Theatre and Arena Stage), Grey Gardens (also at Playwrights Horizons), Dear Evan Hansen (also at Arena Stage and Second Stage), and War Paint (also at the Goodman Theatre, Chicago).

In August 2023, it was announced that his Chicago Shakespeare Theater production of The Notebook would transfer to Broadway in March 2024 and in September 2023, it was announced that he would transfer his Off-Broadway production of Days of Wine and Roses to Broadway in January 2024.

Among his many directing credits Off-Broadway are Alicia Keys' autobiographical musical Hell's Kitchen, Katori Hall's Our Lady of Kibeho, John Guare's Landscape of the Body and A Few Stout Individuals at Signature Theatre, Beauty of the Father for the Manhattan Theatre Club, the 2009 Playwrights Horizons production of Mrs. Sharp (with music and lyrics by Ryan Scott Oliver and starring Jane Krakowski), and Romeo and Juliet, The Winter's Tale, and The Tempest at the New York Shakespeare Festival at the Delacorte Theater (2007, 2010, 2015).

== Personal life ==
Greif has two children, born through artificial insemination with a lesbian friend. His long-time partner is actor Jonathan Fried.

== Work ==
=== Broadway ===
- Rent (1996)
- Never Gonna Dance (2003)
- Grey Gardens (2006)
- Next to Normal (2009)
- If/Then (2014)
- Dear Evan Hansen (2016)
- War Paint (2017)
- Days of Wine and Roses (2024)
- The Notebook (2024)
- Hell's Kitchen (2024)

=== Off-Broadway ===
New York Theatre Workshop

- 70 Scenes of Halloween (1986)
- Rent (1996)
- Bright Lights, Big City (1998)
- Cave-Dweller (2002)

The Public Theater

- Machinal (1990)
- A Bright Room Called Day (1991)
- Casanova (1991)
- Pericles (1992)
- Marisol (1994)
- Dogeaters (2001)
- Satellites (2006)
- The Intelligent Homosexual's Guide... (2010)
- Giant (2012)
- The Low Road (2018)
- Hell's Kitchen (2023)

Signature Theatre

- A Few Stout Individuals (2002)
- Landscape of the Body (2006)
- Angels in America (2010)

Playwrights Horizons

- Spatter Pattern (2004)
- Grey Gardens (2006)
- Far from Heaven (2013)

Second Stage

- Spike Heels (1993)
- Next to Normal (2008)
- Boy's Life (2011)
- Dear Evan Hansen (2016)

Atlantic Theatre Company

- Days of Wine and Roses (2023)

=== La Jolla Playhouse ===
- The Three Cuckolds (1986)
- What the Butler Saw (1992)
- Thérèse Raquin (Neal Bell adaption of Zola) (1994)
- Slavs! (Tony Kushner) (1995)
- Faust (Randy Newman) (1995)
- Boy (Diana Son) (1996)
- Sweet Bird of Youth (1999)
- Our Town (2001)

=== Williamstown Theater Festival ===
- Thérèse Raquin (1994)
- The Seagull (1995)
- Tonight at 8.30 (2001)
- Strew Scene (2002)
- Once in a Lifetime (2003)
- Landscape of the Body (2004)
- The Cherry Orchard (2005)
- Three Sisters (2008)
- Far from Heaven (2011)

=== Guthrie Theater ===
- The Intelligent Homosexual's Guide to Capitalism and Socialism with a Key to the Scriptures (Tony Kushner) (2009)

== Awards and nominations ==
| Year | Award | Category | Work | Result | Ref. |
|---|---|---|---|---|---|
| 1996 | Tony Awards | Best Direction of a Musical | Rent | Nominated | |
| 2007 | Tony Awards | Best Direction of a Musical | Grey Gardens | Nominated | |
| 2009 | Tony Awards | Best Direction of a Musical | Next to Normal | Nominated | |
| 2017 | Tony Awards | Best Direction of a Musical | Dear Evan Hansen | Nominated | |
| 2024 | Tony Awards | Best Direction of a Musical | Hell's Kitchen | Nominated | |
| 1991 | Drama Desk Award | Outstanding Director of a Play | Machinal | Nominated | |
| 1996 | Drama Desk Award | Outstanding Director of a Musical | Rent | Nominated | |
| 2001 | Drama Desk Award | Outstanding Director of a Play | Dogeaters | Nominated | |
| 2007 | Drama Desk Award | Outstanding Director of a Musical | Grey Gardens | Nominated | |
| 2017 | Drama League Award | Founders Award for Excellence in Directing | | Won | |
| 2006 | Outer Critics Circle Award | Outstanding Director of a Musical | Grey Gardens | Nominated | |
| 2016 | Outer Critics Circle Award | Outstanding Director of a Musical | Dear Evan Hansen | Nominated | |
| 2018 | Lucille Lortel Award | Outstanding Director | | Nominated | |
| 2024 | Dorian Award | LGBTQ Theater Artist of the Season | | Nominated | |
