= Light in the Piazza (film) =

1962 film by Guy Green

- Theatrical release poster
- Directed by: Guy Green
- Screenplay by: Julius J. Epstein
- Based on: The Light in the Piazza (1960 novel) by Elizabeth Spencer
- Produced by: Arthur Freed
- Starring: Olivia de Havilland; Rossano Brazzi; Yvette Mimieux; George Hamilton; Barry Sullivan
- Cinematography: Otto Heller
- Edited by: Frank Clarke
- Music by: Mario Nascimbene
- Production company: Metro-Goldwyn-Mayer
- Distributed by: Metro-Goldwyn-Mayer
- Release date: February 7, 1962 (US)
- Running time: 102 minutes
- Country: United States
- Language: English
- Budget: $1,261,000
- Box office: $2.2 million

Light in the Piazza is a 1962 American romantic drama film directed by Guy Green and starring Olivia de Havilland, Rossano Brazzi, Yvette Mimieux, George Hamilton, and Barry Sullivan. Based on the 1960 novel by Elizabeth Spencer, the film is about a beautiful but mentally disabled young American woman traveling in Italy with her mother and the Italian man they meet during one leg of their trip. The film features extensive location shooting in Florence and Rome by the cinematographer Otto Heller.

The film was released by Metro-Goldwyn-Mayer on February 7, 1962. Hamilton was nominated for a Best Foreign Actor at the 16th British Academy Film Awards for his performance.

== Plot ==
While taking a summer holiday in Florence with her mother, Meg, 26-year-old Clara Johnson, an American with a developmental disability since childhood caused by a kick in the head from a Shetland pony, meets and falls in love with a young Italian named Fabrizio Naccarelli. Blinded by his love for Clara, and with his limited English language skills and Clara's limited Italian language skills, Fabrizio believes her disability to be simple naivete. At a local holiday celebration, Meg tries to explain her daughter's condition to Fabrizio's father, but the moment is interrupted when one of the performers, a Naccarelli acquaintance, is wounded in a firearms accident. Afterwards, the opportunity never seems to be right. Fabrizio's family are taken with Clara, whose simple remarks are perceived as evidence of her innocence.

Meg spends the remainder of the trip trying to keep the two lovers apart and fearing that Fabrizio or his family will discover the truth about her daughter. She moves their holiday quickly to Rome, hoping that Clara will soon forget Fabrizio. On discovering how unhappy this has made Clara, however, Meg calls her tobacco executive husband, Noel, asking him to fly to Rome to meet them.

There the couple discusses their daughter's future, and Noel reminds her that Clara's previous suitors have been repulsed as soon as they discover her mental disability. Noel reminds Meg how much other students used to tease Clara when Meg enrolled her in a normal school. He reveals that he has made plans for Clara to be placed in an expensive care home for the mentally disabled. Meg is set against what she sees as the incarceration of her daughter for the rest of her life. The couple argue, and Noel returns to America.

Meg believes that Clara will have a much better life as a wealthy Italian wife with servants and inane gossip to entertain her rather than being placed in such a home. Returning to Florence, she does everything she can to expedite the marriage without her husband's knowledge. Fabrizio and Clara are overjoyed and plans are made for the wedding. Clara begins religious conversion to become a Catholic, and the priest instructing her is impressed with her childlike devotion to the Madonna. Clara's religious dedication, together with the Naccarelli family's connections in the Catholic Church, allows the wedding date to be set.

When Fabrizio's father glances at Clara's passport as they settle the wedding arrangements, he is suddenly alarmed, fleeing the church without explanation and taking Fabrizio with him. Meg fears he has somehow deduced Clara's mental age and does not want his son to marry a disabled person. Eventually, Signor Naccarelli visits Meg at her hotel, chiding her that she should have told him that Clara is 26. He contends that in Italian culture, a young man of 20 cannot marry an older woman without controversy.

When Signor Naccarelli tells his son about the age difference, Fabrizio reminds his father that he is actually 23 and that he so loves Clara that he cares nothing for this slight difference. The situation quickly is resolved for Signor Naccarelli when Clara's dowry is increased from $5,000 to $15,000, in addition to the sweetness of Clara's disposition. The womanizing Signor attempts to proposition Meg, but fails.

The wedding takes place in a church in Florence without Noel's presence. Afterwards, Meg asks the Signor about the man who was wounded by a firearms accident (who fatefully distracted from her attempt to reveal Clara’s disability, thus changing the outcome of Clara and Fabrizio’s union); he tells her the man died. Outside, the bride picks up an Italian wedding confetti candy off the ground, thrown by well-wishers, and puts it in her mouth. When the groom repeats the exact same action, Meg then says to herself, that her decision regarding Clara was the right thing to do.

== Cast ==
- Olivia de Havilland as Meg Johnson
- Rossano Brazzi as Signor Naccarelli
- Yvette Mimieux as Clara Johnson
- George Hamilton as Fabrizio Naccarelli
- Barry Sullivan as Noel Johnson
- Isabel Dean as Miss Hawtree
- Nancy Nevinson as Signora Naccarelli
- Moultrie Kelsall as The Minister

Uncredited

- Rosella Spinelli as Giuseppina Naccarelli
- Robert Rietti as Priest
- Steve Plytas as Concierge

== Production ==
The story first appeared as a novella in The New Yorker in June 1960. MGM purchased film rights in August and assigned it to producer Arthur Freed, while the novel version of the story was published later that year. Julius Epstein wrote the script.

Guy Green was given the job as director on the strength of The Angry Silence.

=== Casting ===
Actresses who tested for the female lead included Dolores Hart; producers selected Yvette Mimieux.

Ingrid Bergman was originally cast as Margaret (Meg), but was replaced by Olivia de Havilland.

Originally, Tomas Milian was cast as the Italian groom. George Hamilton campaigned actively for the role even though it had been cast and eventually succeeded, in part by persuading Ben Thau that he was suitable. Green confirms that Hamilton actively lobbied for the role and worked very hard at it. James Darren and Sal Mineo were both also considered, before Hamilton finally took the role. Italian-British actor and translator Robert Rietti coached Hamilton on the Italian language and accent, in addition to dubbing several minor roles and appearing in a bit part.

Italian actress Rosella Spinelli reportedly declined the female lead in the peplum film The Fury of Hercules so she could play the minor role of Giuseppina, for the opportunity to work with director Guy Green.

=== Filming ===
Principal photography started May 7, 1961. The film was shot on location in Rome and Florence, with interiors at MGM-British Studios near London, England.

Italian locations include:

- Piazza della Signoria, Florence, in which Michelangelo's statue David was then located
- Uffizi Gallery, Florence
- Via Veneto, Rome, which had its famously snarled motor traffic diverted for three shooting days
- Roma Ostiense railway station

While filming in Florence, the cast were honored at an annual charity ball to benefit Italian children. Among the guests was G. Frederick Reinhardt, the US ambassador to Italy.

== Reception ==
=== Box office ===
According to MGM records, the film earned $1.2 million in the U.S. and Canada and $1 million elsewhere, resulting in a loss of $472,000. But film critic Hugh Fordin's 1975 history of the MGM Freed Unit disputes those figures, claiming Light in the Piazza came in at $553,280 on an estimated $1.1 million budget, and grossed $2,345,000, making it a substantial hit.

=== Critical ===
Bosley Crowther of The New York Times thought the premise of a mother's anxieties over a backward, mentally challenged daughter untenable in light of the glamorous, appealing characterization of that daughter:

[T]he girl, as played with sunshine radiance and rapturous grace by Yvette Mimieux, seems no more and no less intelligent than any standard romantic miss in a Hollywood film. Except that she plays with toys in her bathtub, takes a teddy bear to bed, is afraid of ghosts and occasionally throws a tantrum when she cannot have her way, she appears no less bright in the upper story or capable of pulling her weight in a matrimonial rowboat than any doll played by Marilyn Monroe.

Filmink said "Hamilton is very relaxed and likeable; his Italian accent liberated him as an actor, and it was his best performance to date."

=== Awards and nominations ===
Ceremony	Category	Recipient(s)	Outcome	Ref.
16th British Academy Film Awards	Best Foreign Actor	George Hamilton	Nominated	

== See also ==
- List of American films of 1962

== Bibliography ==
- Spencer, Elizabeth (1960). The Light in the Piazza (First ed.). New York: McGraw-Hill. OCLC 290337.
- Fordin, Hugh (August 22, 1996). MGM's Greatest Musicals: The Freed Unit. Da Capo Press. ISBN 978-0306807305.
- Thomas, Tony (1983). The Films of Olivia de Havilland. Citadel Press. ISBN 978-0806508054.
