= The Light in the Piazza (novel) =

1960 novella by Elizabeth Spencer

- First edition cover
- Author: Elizabeth Spencer
- Language: English
- Genre: Fiction
- Publisher: McGraw-Hill
- Publication date: 1960
- Publication place: United States
- Media type: Print (hardcover)
- Pages: 110 pp
- OCLC: 290337

The Light in the Piazza is an American novella by writer Elizabeth Spencer, published in 1960. This novella became Spencer's best known work of fiction.

== Synopsis ==
In 1953, American housewife Margaret Johnson and her mentally disabled 26-year old daughter Clara Johnson are on vacation in Florence, Italy. Clara is mentally disabled because of traumatic brain injury from an incident with a pony at age 10. The mother and daughter encounter a 20-year old Florentine, Fabrizio Naccarelli, in the Piazza della Signoria. Clara and Fabrizio quickly fall in love. In the past, Margaret had advised past young male suitors of Clara's condition after they had expressed romantic interest in her. With this new relationship between Clara and Fabrizio, Margaret examines her past life with Clara following the traumatic brain injury incident, along with her own previous history with Italy, which included her honeymoon with her husband Noel. Margaret confronts the question of whether to advise the Naccarelli family about Clara's condition, in the course of the changing nature of this mother-daughter relationship, and the effects of Italy on Clara's personality.

== Analysis ==
Gérald Préher and Catherine Seltzer have written studies of the novella which each include examination of the theme of the liberation of Margaret Johnson and Clara Johnson from the social structures of the American South, with particular focus on how Italy allows Clara to transcend her mental condition.

== Adaptations ==
Screenwriter Julius J. Epstein adapted Spencer's novella into a 1962 film, titled Light in the Piazza, directed by Guy Green. The cast included Olivia de Havilland, Yvette Mimieux, Rossano Brazzi, and George Hamilton, who was nominated for a BAFTA Award for his performance.

In 2003, the novella inspired a musical adaptation, with the book written by Craig Lucas and the music and lyrics composed by Adam Guettel.
