= Elizabeth Spencer (writer) =

American writer (1921–2019)

- Born: July 19, 1921; Carrollton, Mississippi, U.S.
- Died: December 22, 2019 (aged 98); Chapel Hill, North Carolina, U.S.
- Education: Belhaven University (BA); Vanderbilt University (MA)

Elizabeth Spencer (July 19, 1921 – December 22, 2019) was an American writer. Spencer's first novel, Fire in the Morning, was published in 1948. She wrote a total of nine novels, seven collections of short stories, a memoir (Landscapes of the Heart, 1998), and a play (For Lease or Sale, 1989). Her novella The Light in the Piazza (1960) was adapted for the screen in 1962 and transformed into a Broadway musical of the same name in 2005. She was a five-time recipient of the O. Henry Award for short fiction.

Spencer's themes relate to tension between the individual and the group, and deal with how family or community ties support but also bind the individual's identity. She writes about this as it concerns the inner lives of her female characters, many of whom struggle to establish a fruitful life independent of society's narrow restrictions.

== Early life and career ==
Born in Carrollton, Mississippi, Spencer was valedictorian of her graduating class at J. Z. George High School. She earned her BA at Belhaven College in Jackson, Mississippi and a master's in literature at Vanderbilt University in Nashville, Tennessee in 1943. At Vanderbilt, Spencer studied with Donald Davidson.

Spencer taught at the junior college level at Northwest Mississippi Community College in Senatobia, Mississippi for two years, then accepted a job with the Nashville Tennessean, but she soon returned to teaching, this time at the University of Mississippi in Oxford. In 1953, she was awarded a Guggenheim Fellowship and left Mississippi to live in Italy and pursue writing full-time.

Her third novel, begun in Florence, Italy, The Voice at the Back Door, was the finalist for the Pulitzer Prize for Fiction in 1957. The prize ultimately wasn't awarded that year.

After her first three novels set in Mississippi, Spencer's career foundered for a while, for she was seen as a "Southern woman" writer, and not a literary figure. In 1981 Spencer published her collected Stories, with a foreword by Eudora Welty, and her standing was reestablished among critics, who took another look at her contributions.

== Personal life ==
While in Italy, she met and married John Rusher of Cornwall, England. The couple moved to Montreal, Quebec in 1956, where they remained until moving to Chapel Hill, North Carolina in 1986. She taught creative writing at Concordia University in Montreal, and at the University of North Carolina at Chapel Hill until her retirement. Rusher died in 1998, and Spencer continued to live in her Chapel Hill home until her death on 22 December 2019.

Spencer, through her mother's family, was a cousin of United States senator John McCain.

== Awards and honors ==
- Sidney Lanier Prize for Southern Literature, awarded by Mercer University, 2014
- Lifetime Achievement Award of the Mississippi Institute of Arts and Letters, 2009
- PEN/Malamud Award for Short Fiction, 2007
- Governor's Award for Achievement in Literature from the Mississippi Arts Commission, 2006
- The William Faulkner Medal for Literary Excellence, awarded by The Faulkner House Society, New Orleans, 2002
- Inducted into the North Carolina Hall of Fame, 2002
- Thomas Wolfe Award for Literature given by the University of North Carolina at Chapel Hill and the Morgan Foundation, 2002
- Cleanth Brooks Medal for achievement awarded by the Fellowship of Southern Writers, 2001
- Mississippi State Library Association Award for non-fiction, 1999
- Fortner Award for Literature, St. Andrews Presbyterian College, Laurinburg, North Carolina, 1998
- Richard Wright Literary Excellence Award for fiction, 1997
- J. William Corrington Award for fiction, Centenary College, Shreveport, Louisiana, 1997
- Charter Member Fellowship of Southern Writers, 1987; Vice-Chancellor, 1993–1997
- North Carolina Governor's Award for Literature, 1994
- John Dos Passos Award for Literature, 1992
- Salem Award for Distinction in Letters, Salem College, 1992
- National Endowment for the Arts Senior Fellowship in Literature Grant, 1988
- Election to the American Institute (now American Academy) of Arts and Letters, 1985
- Award of Merit Medal for the Short Story, American Academy, 1983
- National Endowment for the Arts Fellowship, 1983
- Bellaman Award, 1968
- Donnelly Fellowship, Bryn Mawr College, 1962
- McGraw-Hill Fiction Fellowship, 1960
- First Rosenthal Award, American Academy, 1957
- Kenyon Review Fiction Fellowship, 1956–57
- Guggenheim Foundation Fellowship, 1953
- Recognition Award, American Academy of Arts and Letters, 1952
- Mississippi Writers Trail historical marker, 2019

== Works ==
=== Novels ===
- Fire in the Morning (1948, Dodd, Mead / 2012, University Press of Mississippi; ISBN 978-1-61703-618-7)
- This Crooked Way (1952, Dodd, Mead / 2012, University Press of Mississippi; ISBN 978-1-61703-218-9)
- The Voice at the Back Door (1956, McGraw-Hill / 1994, Louisiana State University Press; ISBN 978-0-8071-1927-3)
- Knights and Dragons (1965, McGraw-Hill; ISBN 978-0-07-060145-1)
- No Place for an Angel (1967, McGraw-Hill / 2020, Liveright; ISBN 978-1-63149-063-7)
- The Snare (1972, McGraw-Hill; ISBN 978-0-07-060178-9 / 2012, University Press of Mississippi; ISBN 978-1-61703-686-6)
- The Salt Line (1984, Doubleday; ISBN 978-0-385-15698-1 / 1995, Louisiana State University Press; ISBN 978-0-8071-2029-3)
- The Night Travellers (1991, Viking Press; ISBN 978-0-670-83915-5 / 2012, University Press of Mississippi; ISBN 978-1-61703-240-0)

=== Short story collections ===
- Ship Island and Other Stories (1968, McGraw-Hill; ISBN 978-0-07-060182-6)
- The Stories of Elizabeth Spencer (1981, Doubleday; ISBN 978-0-385-15697-4 / 1983, Penquin Books; ISBN 978-0-14-006436-0)
- Marilee: Three Stories (1981, University Press of Mississippi; ISBN 978-0-87805-141-0)
- Jack of Diamonds and Other Stories (1988, Viking Press; ISBN 978-0-670-82261-4 / 1989, Penquin Books; ISBN 978-0-14-012252-7)
- On the Gulf (1991, University Press of Mississippi; ISBN 978-0-87805-507-4)
- The Light in the Piazza and Other Italian Tales (1960, McGraw-Hill / 1996, University Press of Mississippi; ISBN 978-0-87805-837-2)
- The Southern Woman (2001, The Modern Library; ISBN 978-0-679-64218-3 / 2009, The Modern Library; ISBN 978-0-8129-8076-9 / 2021, The Modern Library; ISBN 978-0-5932-4118-9)
- Starting Over (2014, Liveright; ISBN 978-0-87140-681-1 / 2020, Liveright; ISBN 978-0-87140-298-1)

=== Memoir ===
- Landscapes of the Heart: A Memoir (1997, Random House; ISBN 978-0-679-45739-8 / 2003, Louisiana State University Press; ISBN 978-0-8071-2916-6)

=== Play ===
- For Lease or Sale (1989; produced by Playmakers, UNC Chapel Hill, 1989)

=== Collection ===
- Elizabeth Spencer: Novels & Stories: The Voice at the Back Door / The Light in the Piazza / Knights and Dragons / Stories (Library of America, June 1, 2021, ISBN 978-1-598-53686-7)

=== Short fiction ===
Title	Publication	Collected in
"Pilgrimage"	Virginia Quarterly Review (Summer 1950)	-
"The Little Brown Girl"	The New Yorker (July 20, 1957)	Ship Island
"The Eclipse"	The New Yorker (July 12, 1958)	The Stories of Elizabeth Spencer
"First Dark"	The New Yorker (June 20, 1959)	Ship Island
"A Southern Landscape"	The New Yorker (March 26, 1960)	Ship Island
"The Light in the Piazza"	The New Yorker (June 18, 1960)	The Light in the Piazza
"Moon Rocket"	McCall's (October 1960)	The Stories of Elizabeth Spencer
"The White Azalea"	Texas Quarterly (Winter 1961)	Ship Island
"A Beautiful Day for the Wedding"	Redbook (September 1962)	-
"The Atwater Fiancee"	The Montrealer (September 1963)	-
"The Visit"	Prairie Schooner (Summer 1964)	Ship Island
"The Fishing Lake"	The New Yorker (August 29, 1964)	Ship Island
"Ship Island"	The New Yorker (September 12, 1964)	Ship Island
"The Adult Holiday"	The New Yorker (June 12, 1965)	The Stories of Elizabeth Spencer
"Knights & Dragons"	Redbook (July 1965)	The Stories of Elizabeth Spencer
"The Pincian Gate"	The New Yorker (April 16, 1966)	The Stories of Elizabeth Spencer
"The Absence"	The New Yorker (September 10, 1966)	The Stories of Elizabeth Spencer
"The Bufords" aka "Those Bufords"	McCall's (January 1967)	The Stories of Elizabeth Spencer
"A Bad Cold"	The New Yorker (May 27, 1967)	The Stories of Elizabeth Spencer
"On the Gulf"	Delta Review (February 1968)	The Stories of Elizabeth Spencer
"Judith Kane"	Ship Island (1968)	Ship Island
"Wisteria"	Ship Island (1968)	Ship Island
"The Day Before"	Ship Island (1968)	Ship Island
"Sharon"	The New Yorker (May 9, 1970)	The Stories of Elizabeth Spencer
"Presents"	Shenandoah (Winter 1971)	The Stories of Elizabeth Spencer
"The Finder"	The New Yorker (January 23, 1971)	The Stories of Elizabeth Spencer
"Instrument of Destruction"	Mississippi Review (1972)	The Stories of Elizabeth Spencer
"A Kiss at the Door"	The Southern Review (Summer 1972)	The Stories of Elizabeth Spencer
"The Name of the Game"	McCall's (September 1972)	-
"A Christian Education"	The Atlantic (March 1974)	The Stories of Elizabeth Spencer
"Mr. McMillan"	The Southern Review (Winter 1975)	The Stories of Elizabeth Spencer
"Prelude to a Parking Lot"	The Southern Review (Summer 1976)	The Stories of Elizabeth Spencer
"I, Maureen"	New Canadian Stories (1976)	The Stories of Elizabeth Spencer
"Port of Embarkation"	The Atlantic (January 1977)	The Stories of Elizabeth Spencer
"Indian Summer"	Southern Review (Summer 1978)	The Stories of Elizabeth Spencer
"The Girl Who Loved Horses"	Ontario Review (Spring/Summer 1979)	The Stories of Elizabeth Spencer
"The Search"	Chatelaine (April 1979)	The Stories of Elizabeth Spencer
"Go South in Winter"	Journal of Canadian Fiction 23 (1979)	The Stories of Elizabeth Spencer
"Jean-Pierre"	The New Yorker (August 17, 1981)	Jack of Diamonds
"The Cousins"	The Southern Review (Spring 1985)	Jack of Diamonds
"Jack of Diamonds"	The Kenyon Review (Summer 1986)	Jack of Diamonds
"The Business Venture"	The Southern Review (Spring 1987)	Jack of Diamonds
"The Skater"	North American Review (June 1988)	Jack of Diamonds
"The Legacy"	The Legacy, Mud Puppy Press (1988)	On the Gulf
"A Fugitive's Wife"	On the Gulf (1991)	On the Gulf
"The Weekend Travelers"	Story (Winter 1994)	The Southern Woman
"The Runaways"	Antaeus (Spring 1994)	The Southern Woman
"The Master of Shongalo"	The Southern Review (Winter 1995)	The Southern Woman
"The Everlasting Light"	Raleigh News & Observer (December 20, 1998)	Starting Over
"Owl"	Nightshade, ed. Robert Phillips (1999)	The Southern Woman
"First Child"	The Southern Review (Spring 2000)	The Southern Woman
"The Boy in the Tree"	The Southern Review (Summer 2004)	Starting Over
"Sightings"	The Hudson Review (July 2008)	Starting Over
"Return Trip"	Five Points: A Journal of Literature and Art (Spring 2009)	Starting Over
"Rising Tide"	Oxford American (July 2010)	Starting Over
"Christmas Longings"	Our State (December 2012)	Starting Over
"Blackie"	Epoch (2012)	Starting Over
"On the Hill"	Five Points (February 2013)	Starting Over
"The Wedding Visitor"	Zyzzyva (July 2013)	Starting Over
