= Ted Sperling =

- Born: Manhattan, New York, United States
- Occupations: Musical director, conductor, orchestrator, arranger, stage director
- Website: www.tedsperling.net

Ted Sperling is a musical director, conductor, orchestrator, arranger, stage director and musician, primarily for the stage and concerts. He won the Tony Award for Best Orchestrations and the Drama Desk Award, Outstanding Orchestrations, for his work in The Light in the Piazza in 2005. He is the artistic director of MasterVoices, formerly the Collegiate Chorale.

== Career ==
Sperling was born in Manhattan and started taking violin lessons at age 5, studied at Juilliard School starting at age 16, and graduated from Yale University, Phi Beta Kappa, summa cum laude at the age of 21.

Sperling has been the musical director, conductor, stage director and/or arranger for such Broadway musicals as the revival of South Pacific (2008) and The Light in the Piazza (2005), and for some ten Off-Broadway musicals, starting with Gus and Al in 1989 through Striking 12 in 2006. He appeared on-stage in the musical Titanic (1997) as a performer and one of the on-stage trio of musicians. He began stage directing in regional theatre in 2001, and then directed the musical See What I Wanna See, both regionally and off-Broadway, in 2004 and 2005.

He is the musical conductor for concerts for performer Victoria Clark. The two met at Yale University, when they sang in the Yale Chapel Choir and he was also the first violist in the Yale Symphony Orchestra. He has also conducted concerts for Audra McDonald, such as her Houston Grand Opera debut in March 2006 and her New York Philharmonic New Year's Eve concert, December 31, 2006. In 2013 he was named artistic director of MasterVoices, formerly The Collegiate Chorale.

In 2002 he was named Associate Artistic Director of the Prince Music Theater in Philadelphia, PA . In 2008 he was appointed Director of the Public Theater's Musical Theatre Initiative.

As an actor, he appeared on Broadway as the bandleader Wallace Hartley in the original production of Titanic (1997) and played Steve Allen in a television appearance of Lenny Bruce (portrayed by Luke Kirby) during the last episode of Season 2 in The Marvelous Mrs. Maisel.

== Work (selected) ==
- Guys and Dolls (2008) - Musical Director, Vocal and incidental music arrangements
- South Pacific (2008) - Musical Director, Conductor
- Striking 12 (2006), Daryl Roth Theatre, Stage director,
- The Light in the Piazza (2005) - Orchestrator, musical director, Conductor
- Peter Pan and Wendy (2002), Prince Music Theater, Philadelphia, Stage Director
- Lady in the Dark (2001), Prince Music Theater, Philadelphia, Stage Director
- The Full Monty (2000) - Musical Director, Vocal and incidental music arrangements
- How to Succeed in Business Without Really Trying (1995) - Musical Director, Conductor, Vocal and incidental music arrangements
- Sunday in the Park with George (1984) Synthesizer
