= The Light in the Piazza (musical) =

2005 musical by Adam Guettel and Craig Lucas

- Poster for the original Broadway production
- Music: Adam Guettel
- Lyrics: Adam Guettel
- Book: Craig Lucas
- Basis: The Light in the Piazza by Elizabeth Spencer
- Productions: 2003 Seattle; 2005 Broadway; 2006 US national tour 2009 Leicester; 2010 Toronto; 2019 Royal Festival Hall; 2023 Encores!
- Awards: 2005 Tony Award for Best Original Score; 2005 Drama Desk Award for Outstanding Music

The Light in the Piazza is a musical with music and lyrics by Adam Guettel, and a book by Craig Lucas.

Based on the 1960 novella by Elizabeth Spencer, the show is set in the 1950s and tells the story of Margaret Johnson, a wealthy woman from the American South, and Clara, her daughter, who is developmentally disabled due to a childhood accident. The two spend a summer together in Florence, Italy. When Clara falls in love with a young Italian man, Fabrizio, Margaret is forced to reconsider not only Clara's future, but her own deep-seated hopes and regrets as well.

The score breaks from the 21st century tradition of pop music on Broadway by moving into the territory of Neoromantic classical music and opera, with unexpected harmonic shifts and extended melodic structures, and is more heavily orchestrated than most Broadway scores. Many of the lyrics are in Italian or broken English, as many of the characters are fluent only in Italian.

== Productions ==
=== Original production ===
The Light in the Piazza was developed as a musical at the Intiman Playhouse in Seattle in June 2003 and then at the Goodman Theatre in Chicago in early 2004. Victoria Clark starred as Margaret Johnson, Celia Keenan-Bolger played Clara Johnson, and Steven Pasquale played Fabrizio Naccarelli. Kelli O'Hara also played Franca Naccarelli. When the show transferred to Broadway, Pasquale stepped away due to a conflict with the television series Rescue Me. In addition, O'Hara assumed the role of Clara.

=== Broadway production and national tour ===
After 36 previews, the Broadway production opened on April 18, 2005, at the Vivian Beaumont Theater in Lincoln Center, where it ran for 504 performances and closed on July 2, 2006. The musical was directed by Bartlett Sher, choreographed by Jonathan Butterell, with lighting by Christopher Akerlind, set by Michael Yeargan and costumes by Catherine Zuber. The cast featured Clark, O'Hara, Matthew Morrison, Michael Berresse and Sarah Uriarte Berry. Chris Sarandon joined the cast as Signor Naccarelli later in the run, Aaron Lazar was a replacement in the role of Fabrizio and Katie Rose Clarke was a replacement in the role of Clara.

On June 15, 2006, shortly before its closing night, the show was broadcast on the PBS television series Live from Lincoln Center, and drew more than two million viewers. The cast consisted of Victoria Clark (Margaret), Katie Rose Clarke (Clara), Aaron Lazar (Fabrizio), Chris Sarandon (Signor Naccarelli), Patti Cohenour (Signora Naccarelli), Michael Berresse (Giuseppe), Sarah Uriarte Berry (Franca), and Beau Gravitte (Roy).

A United States national tour starring Christine Andreas as Margaret, Elena Shaddow as Clara, and David Burnham as Fabrizio started at the Orpheum Theatre in San Francisco, California, in August 2006 and ended in Chicago on July 22, 2007.

=== Other productions ===
A Japanese production of the musical was produced in December 2007, having a limited engagement of about a month. It starred Kaho Shimada as Margaret Johnson.

An Australian concert version had a one-night presentation at the Lyric Theatre, Star City in Sydney on August 17, 2008. The cast consisted of members of the Australian company of The Phantom of the Opera, with Jackie Rees as Margaret, Kathleen Moore as Clara and James Pratt as Fabrizio. The production was directed by John O'May.

In the summer of 2008, Guettel reconfigured the musical as a smaller chamber piece for the Weston Playhouse Theatre Company in Vermont, where Sarah Uriarte Berry reprised her role as Franca.

The show had its opera house premiere in October 2008 at Piedmont Opera in Winston-Salem, North Carolina. It starred Jill Gardner as Margaret and Sarah Jane McMahon as Clara, directed by Dorothy Danner and conducted by James Allbritten.

The first Los Angeles area local premiere was seen at the Covina Center for the Performing Arts in 2009. It starred Christopher Callen as Margaret, Brooke Tansley as Clara, and Craig D' Amico as Fabrizio (all Broadway veterans) under the direction of Brady Schwind.

The Lethbridge Symphony Orchestra in Alberta presented the musical at the Genevieve E. Yates Memorial Centre October 19–21, 2009, which was the Canadian première. Directed by Fran Rude and musical direction by Ken Rogers this production starred Diane Llewelyn-Jones as Margaret, Nicole Higginson as Clara and Steven Morton as Fabrizio.

The Berkeley Street Theatre in Toronto saw the Canadian première by Acting Up Stage running in February 2010.

The Arena Stage (Washington, DC) production ran from March 5, 2010 through April 11, 2010, with Hollis Resnik as Margaret.

The European premiere was directed by Paul Kerryson at the Curve theatre, Leicester, UK, in May 2009, starring Lucy Schaufer as Margaret and Caroline Sheen as Clara, with design by George Souglides, musical direction by Julian Kelly, lighting design by Giuseppe di Iorio, sound design by Paul Groothuis.

A highly acclaimed production at Theo Ubique Cabaret Theater in Chicago opened on March 11, 2012, starring Kelli Harrington as Margaret and Rachel Klippel as Clara. Harrington's performance won the Jeff Award for Best Actress. The run was extended through June.

The 2013 Shaw Festival production ran in rep at the Court House Theatre in Niagara on the Lake, Ontario, Canada. Previews began July 4, 2013 with the official opening July 26, 2013; the show closed on October 13. The musical was directed by Jay Turvey and starred Patty Jamieson as Margaret Johnson.

Front Porch Theatricals (Pittsburgh) staged a performance in August 2015. It received rave reviews from both local and national critics with BroadwayWorld hailing the overall production and Josh Grosso in the role of Fabrizio. The cast included Becki Toth as Margaret and Lindsay Bayer as Clara. It was directed by Stephen Santa.

On April 4, 2016, the entire original Broadway cast reunited for a benefit concert version of the musical at the Vivian Beaumont Theater, where it originally played.

The work was presented by Life Like Company at the Arts Centre Melbourne from October 28, 2016 to November 6, 2016, directed by Theresa Borg and starring Chelsea Plumley (Margaret Johnson), Genevieve Kingsford (Clara Johnson) and Jonathan Hickey (Fabrizio Naccarelli).

The musical was produced in London at Royal Festival Hall from June 14, 2019 to July 6, starring Renée Fleming as Margaret Johnson and Dove Cameron as Clara. Daniel Evans directed. This production then moved to the Dorothy Chandler Pavilion in Los Angeles in October, the Lyric Opera of Chicago in December with Solea Pfeiffer taking over as Clara.

A semi-staged Encores! production ran at New York City Center from June 21–25, 2023. It starred Ruthie Ann Miles as Margaret, Shereen Ahmed as Franca, Andréa Burns as Signora Naccarelli, Rodd Cyrus as Giuseppe, James D. Gish as Fabrizio, Ivan Hernandez as Signor Naccarelli and Anna Zavelson as Clara. Directed by Chay Yew, it "reexamined the musical ... from an Asian American perspective.

The German-language premiere took place at the Landesbühnen Sachsen in 2018. The English text was translated by Roman Hinze, while the Italian remained unchanged from the original. The second interpretation of the musical in German took place in 2025 at the Musiktheater im Revier in Gelsenkirchen. The plot also remained untouched, despite the fact that the family from America speaks German and the Italian family speaks German with an Italian accent.

== Synopsis ==
=== Act 1 ===
In the early morning of their first day in Florence, Margaret reads to Clara from her guide book as the piazza around them wakes up and comes to life ("Statues and Stories"). A breeze carries Clara's hat off her head and across the square. A young Italian man, Fabrizio, catches it, mid-air, and returns it to her. The two are instantly smitten, but Margaret steers her daughter away from the encounter, bringing her to the Uffizi Gallery where the marble statues and reaching figures in the paintings speak to Clara of her own yearnings ("The Beauty Is"). Fabrizio appears, hoping to arrange a time to meet with Clara, but Margaret intervenes again.

Fabrizio, alone, declares his love for Clara, along with a heartfelt cry of fear that she could never love anyone as lost and without position as he ("Il Mondo Era Vuoto"). Fabrizio begs his father, Signor Naccarelli, and his brother, Giuseppe, to help him appear more presentably for Clara. Giuseppe attempts to teach Fabrizio some dance steps as well ("American Dancing").

At the Duomo, Fabrizio catches up with Margaret and Clara, this time with Fabrizio's father, who is able to help penetrate Margaret's resistance to any further involvement. They all agree to meet later that day at sunset to take a walk and admire the view of the city from above at the Piazzale Michelangelo ("Passeggiata").

Margaret and Clara are invited to have tea at the Naccarelli home. Giuseppe's wife, Franca, takes Clara on a tour of the apartment, and alone in a separate room, she warns Clara about how quickly love can stale in marriage ("The Joy You Feel"). Though the Naccarellis are universally impressed with Clara, Margaret tries without success to share her deep reservations. When she looks in Fabrizio's eyes and sees the love there, she cannot bring herself to disappoint him, as much as she feels she must; for there is something about Clara that none of these people know. Clara secretly makes plans to meet Fabrizio at midnight near the hotel.

Margaret calls her husband Roy, who is back in the states. She tries to tell him what is happening with Clara and Fabrizio, but he is brusque and not very understanding, cutting short the conversation. Margaret, alone in her hotel room, reflects on the loneliness in her marriage ("Dividing Day"). She checks in Clara's room and finds that she is missing.

On her way to meet Fabrizio, Clara becomes lost in the maze-like streets of Florence. She loses all poise and control, becoming hysterical and screaming like a child ("Hysteria"). Her mother takes her back to the hotel and, as Clara sleeps, reveals the source of her disquiet to the audience. When Clara was a young girl, she was kicked in the head by a Shetland pony, and the accident has caused her mental and emotional abilities to develop abnormally. Margaret feels that she must take Clara away from Florence at once, and she steps down into the lobby to have a drink. While she is away, Fabrizio comes to the room, distraught; he cannot find the right words to express his feelings, and Clara urges him to use any other means; Clara accepts Fabrizio's proposal of marriage, and the two are embracing, half undressed, as Margaret walks in on them ("Say It Somehow").

=== Act 2 ===
Margaret takes Clara to Rome to distract her and put an end to the affair. Back in Florence, the Naccarelli household is in complete chaos. As the family despairs, Signora Naccarelli translates in an aside; Fabrizio believes he has ruined everything with Clara, his father attempts to comfort him, and Giuseppe and Franca desire finer details ("Aiutami").

No matter what Margaret tries, her daughter refuses to give her an inch, culminating in a painful confrontation wherein Margaret slaps Clara across the face. Clara erupts with a torrent of feeling, centered on Fabrizio and the nature of love ("The Light in the Piazza"). This causes Margaret to relent, to set aside her doubts and considerations, and to no longer stand in the way of the wedding. The two return to Florence.

Clara is instructed in the Latin catechism in preparation for converting to Catholicism while around her everyone in the extended family sings of their feelings, stirred up by the immediate presence of such intense, young love ("Octet Part 1"). Franca, in an attempt to arouse her husband's jealousy, kisses Fabrizio right on the mouth, and Clara witnesses it, breaking into a furious rant that ends with her throwing a drink on Franca ("Clara's Tirade"). As Clara breaks down, Franca commends her for her bravery and declares her own desire to fight for Giuseppe. She toasts the upcoming union and is joined by the rest of the family ("Octet Part 2").

At the wedding rehearsal, Clara and Fabrizio are filling out the necessary forms when Signor Naccarelli sees something on Clara's form that causes him to call off the wedding and take his family away at once. Clara wants to know what is wrong with her, but her mother says there is nothing at all wrong. With Clara sobbing and broken, alone in one of the pews of the church, Margaret reveals her worst fears and her shame at having been the source of her daughter's lifelong suffering. She resolves to do whatever it takes to give Clara a chance for happiness ("The Beauty Is (Reprise)").

Margaret tries to reason with Signor Naccarelli, who saw Clara's childlike handwriting as she completed her marriage form. Seemingly unconcerned with her immaturity or her handwriting, Signor Naccarelli admits that he saw Clara write her age on the forms – 26 – and that this makes her an unsuitable bride for his son who is only 20. Relieved that he has not discovered their secret, Margaret begs him to change his mind, but he will not. She invites him to take a walk with her, and the two wander from one end of Florence to the other as the sun slowly sets and the night comes on ("Let's Walk"). By giving him time to mull things over and by not pressuring him, Margaret succeeds in putting the wedding back on track. They share a kiss and Signor Naccarelli promises his family will meet the Johnsons at the church the following morning, as originally planned.

From the hotel room, Margaret calls Roy to tell him about the wedding. As might be predicted, he insists that Clara cannot handle the responsibilities of marriage. Clara, in her wedding dress, stands in the shadows, overhearing her mother's side of the conversation. Margaret says, "Just because she isn't normal, Roy, doesn't mean she's consigned to a life of loneliness. She mustn't be made to accept less from life just because she isn't like you or me." Shattered, Clara slips out of the hotel room and runs once more through Florence ("Clara's Interlude"), meeting Fabrizio at the church in order to tell him that she cannot marry him; she won't allow herself to cause him any pain. However, Fabrizio assuages all of her fears ("Love to Me").

Moments before the wedding, Clara tells Margaret she can't leave her; Margaret assures her she can. Left alone, Margaret breaks open all the repressed doubts and yearnings that she has carried for years on end about love, realizing at last that the chance of love somehow outweighs the terrible risks, and joins the wedding ceremony ("Fable").

== Musical numbers ==
Act 1

- "Overture" – Orchestra
- "Statues and Stories" – Margaret Johnson, Clara Johnson, and Ensemble
- "The Beauty Is" – Clara
- "Il Mondo Era Vuoto" – Fabrizio Naccarelli
- "American Dancing" – Orchestra
- "Passeggiata" – Fabrizio and Clara
- "The Joy You Feel" – Franca Naccarelli
- "Dividing Day" – Margaret
- "Hysteria / Lullaby" – Clara, Fabrizio, and Margaret
- "Say It Somehow" – Clara and Fabrizio

Act 2

- "Entr'acte" – Orchestra†
- "Aiutami" – The Naccarelli Family
- "The Light in the Piazza" – Clara
- "Octet / Clara's Tirade" – Company
- "The Beauty Is (Reprise)" – Margaret
- "Let's Walk" – Signor Naccarelli and Margaret
- "Clara's Interlude" – Clara
- "Love to Me" – Fabrizio
- "Fable" – Margaret

†=Not on the Broadway Cast Album

== Instrumentation ==
Guettel, Ted Sperling, and Bruce Coughlin won the 2005 Tony Award for best orchestration, which was performed by a 15-piece pit orchestra:

- Strings: 6 violins, 2 cellos, 1 bass, 1 harp
- Guitars (1 player): steel-string acoustic, nylon-string acoustic, mandolin, suspended cymbal
- Piano/celesta
- Woodwinds: Reed 1: clarinet, English horn, oboe; and Reed 2: bassoon, contrabassoon
- Percussion (1 player): timpani, marimba, vibes (motor off always), chimes, orchestra bells, crotales, snare drum, bass drum, low tom tom, suspended cymbal, splash cymbal, choke cymbal, finger cymbals, triangle, mark tree, cowbell, slapstick, big gong, small gong

== Casts ==
Character	Seattle (2003)	Broadway (2005)	US national tour (2006)
Margaret Johnson	Victoria Clark	Victoria Clark	Christine Andreas
Clara Johnson	Celia Keenan-Bolger	Kelli O'Hara	Elena Shaddow
Fabrizio Naccarelli	Steven Pasquale	Matthew Morrison	David Burnham
Giuseppe Naccarelli	Glenn Seven Allen	Michael Berresse	Jonathan Hammond
Franca Naccarelli	Kelli O'Hara	Sarah Uriarte Berry	Laura Griffith
Signora Naccarelli	Patti Cohenour	Patti Cohenour	Diane Sutherland
Signor Naccarelli	Mark Harelik	Mark Harelik	David Ledingham
Roy Johnson	Robert Shampain	Beau Gravitte	Brian Sutherland

=== Broadway replacements ===
- Aaron Lazar as Fabrizio from September 2, 2005
- Chris Sarandon as Signor Naccarelli from September 13, 2005
- Katie Rose Clarke as Clara from December 15, 2005

== Critical response ==
CurtainUp called the musical a "gorgeously staged and musically sophisticated adaptation... the Guettel sound is nevertheless plush and enjoyable with a genuine musical theater sensibility.... Lucas has made room for the young lovers' voices and retained enough of the psychological complexities to prevent this from being the dated soap opera it could easily have been." Michael Feingold, in his review for the Village Voice, commented: "It has some considerable shortcomings...but its main distinction is that its humanity separates it from the bulk of current musical theater."

Critic John Simon, in New York magazine, wrote: "Anyone who cares about the rather uncertain future of this truly American genre should – must – see the show, think and worry about it, and reach his or her own conclusions ... Craig Lucas's book seems perfectly adequate to me, but the emphasis must be on Adam Guettel's music and lyrics ... the music, though fluctuating between the Sondheimesque and offbeat but still Broadwayish and the art-songlike and even operatic, is steadily absorbing, even if only intermittently melodious. One duet, "Let's Walk", is an unqualified hit, but the rest, without fully cohering, is also arresting. Ted Sperling and Guettel's jaunty orchestrations add to the slightly disorienting but wholly fascinating harmonies and instrumentation."

Ben Brantley, in The New York Times, deemed the show "encouragingly ambitious and discouragingly unfulfilled... the production comes into its own only in the sweetly bitter maternal regrets and dreams of Margaret Johnson." He further made special mention of the "gorgeous autumn-leaf-strewn set", the "lush golden lighting" and "the delectable period costumes".

In reviewing the revival starring Renee Fleming in 2019, Chris Jones said the show employed, "the most soul-satisfying score written for Broadway so far this century." He concluded, "'Piazza' is still very much alive and, in this staging, as vital as ever."

== Awards and nominations ==
=== Original Broadway production ===
Year	Award	Category	Nominee	Result
2005	Tony Award	Best Musical		Nominated
2005	Tony Award	Best Book of a Musical	Craig Lucas	Nominated
2005	Tony Award	Best Original Score	Adam Guettel	Won
2005	Tony Award	Best Actress in a Musical	Victoria Clark	Won
2005	Tony Award	Best Featured Actor in a Musical	Matthew Morrison	Nominated
2005	Tony Award	Best Featured Actress in a Musical	Kelli O'Hara	Nominated
2005	Tony Award	Best Direction of a Musical	Bartlett Sher	Nominated
2005	Tony Award	Best Orchestrations	Adam Guettel, Ted Sperling and Bruce Coughlin	Won
2005	Tony Award	Best Scenic Design	Michael Yeargan	Won
2005	Tony Award	Best Costume Design	Catherine Zuber	Won
2005	Tony Award	Best Lighting Design	Christopher Akerlind	Won
2005	Drama Desk Award	Outstanding Musical		Nominated
2005	Drama Desk Award	Outstanding Actor in a Musical	Matthew Morrison	Nominated
2005	Drama Desk Award	Outstanding Actress in a Musical	Victoria Clark	Won
2005	Drama Desk Award	Outstanding Featured Actress in a Musical	Sarah Uriarte Berry	Nominated
2005	Drama Desk Award	Outstanding Director of a Musical	Bartlett Sher	Nominated
2005	Drama Desk Award	Outstanding Orchestrations	Ted Sperling and Adam Guettel	Won
2005	Drama Desk Award	Outstanding Music	Adam Guettel	Won
2005	Drama Desk Award	Outstanding Set Design	Michael Yeargan	Won
2005	Drama Desk Award	Outstanding Costume Design	Catherine Zuber	Nominated
2005	Drama Desk Award	Outstanding Lighting Design	Christopher Akerlind	Won
2005	Drama Desk Award	Outstanding Sound Design	Acme Sound Partners	Nominated
