= The Hours (novel) =

1998 novel by Michael Cunningham

- Author: Michael Cunningham
- Language: English
- Genre: Literary fiction
- Publisher: Farrar, Straus and Giroux
- Publication date: November 11, 1998
- Publication place: United States
- Media type: Print (hardcover & paperback)
- Pages: 230 (hardcover 1st edition)
- ISBN: 0374172897
- OCLC: 39339842

The Hours, a 1998 novel by the American writer Michael Cunningham, is a tribute to Virginia Woolf's 1925 work Mrs Dalloway. Cunningham emulates elements of Woolf's writing style while revisiting some of her themes in different settings. The Hours won the 1999 Pulitzer Prize for Fiction and the 1999 PEN/Faulkner Award for Fiction, and was later made into an Oscar-winning, 2002, eponymous film and a 2022 opera in two acts with music by Kevin Puts and an English-language libretto by Greg Pierce, based on the novel and its 2002 film adaptation, both with the same title.

== Description ==
The nonlinear narrative unfolds primarily through the perspectives of three women across three decades, with each woman somehow affected by Woolf's novel Mrs. Dalloway.

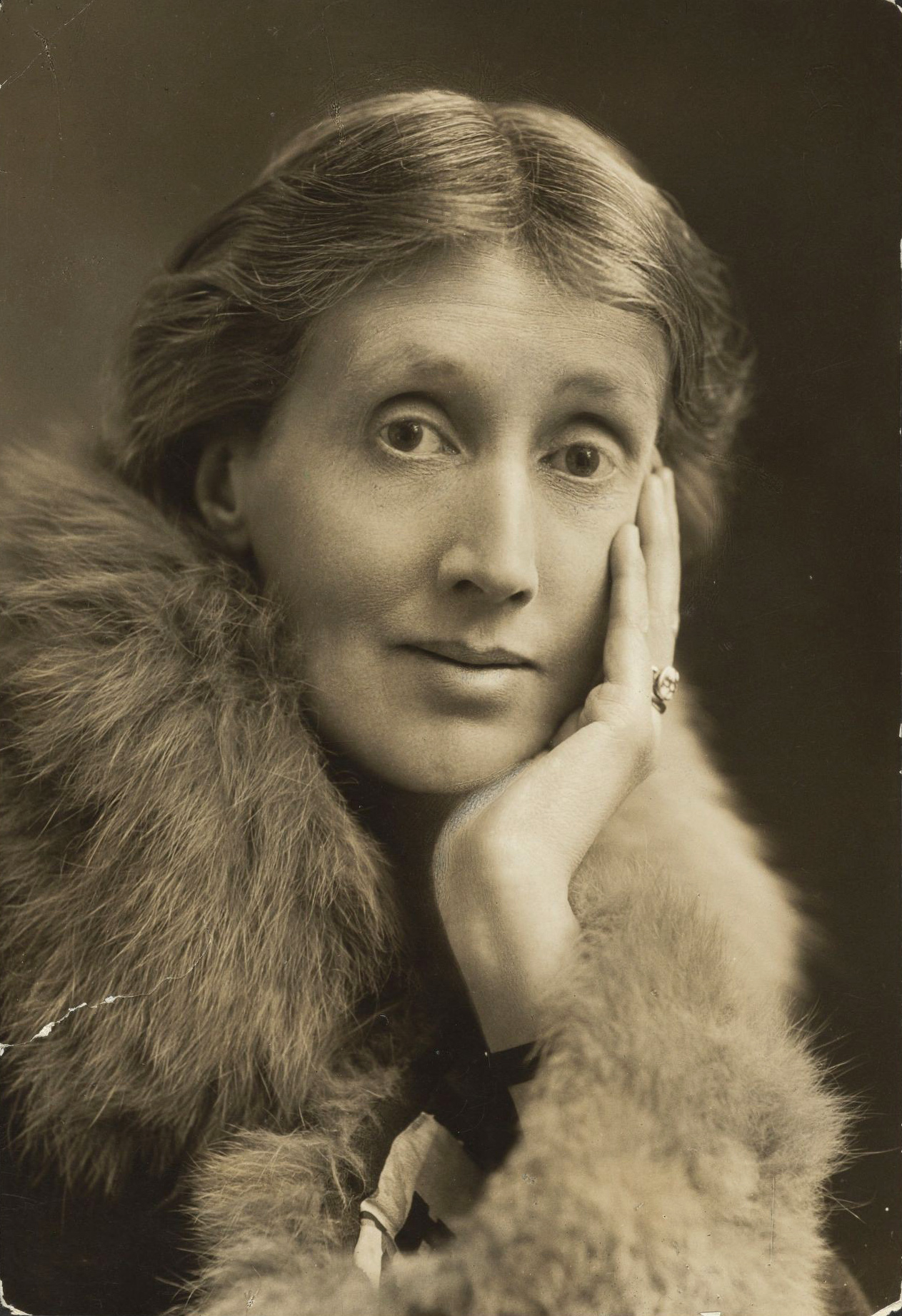
Virginia Woolf in 1927

In 1923 Richmond, London, author Virginia Woolf writes Mrs. Dalloway and struggles with mental illness. In 1949 Los Angeles, Laura Brown is reading Mrs. Dalloway while planning a birthday party for her husband, a World War II veteran. In 1999 New York City, Clarissa Vaughan plans a party to celebrate a major literary award received by her good friend and former lover, the poet Richard, who is dying of an AIDS-related illness.

The situations of all three characters mirror situations experienced by Woolf's character Clarissa Dalloway in Mrs. Dalloway, with Clarissa Vaughan being a modern-day version of Woolf's character. Like Dalloway, Vaughan goes to buy flowers while reflecting on the minutiae of the day around her, and later prepares to host a party. Both Dalloway and Vaughan also contrast their histories and past loves with their current lives, which they both perceive as trivial. Several other characters in Vaughan's story also parallel characters in Mrs. Dalloway.

Cunningham's novel mirrors Mrs. Dalloway's stream-of-consciousness narrative style, which Woolf and James Joyce pioneered. The protagonists' flowing thoughts and perceptions are depicted as they would occur in real life, and the characters interact with the present and with memories; this contextualizes personal history and backstory, such as buying flowers and baking a cake, which otherwise might appear trivial.

Similarly to Woolf's novel, Cunningham's novel places the story within one day; Woolf's Mrs. Dalloway describes one day in the central character's life while Cunningham's novel describes one day in the life of each of the three central characters: Clarissa Vaughan, Laura Brown, and Virginia Woolf. Through these characters, Cunningham attempts to show the beauty and profundity of every day in a person's life and how a person's whole life can be examined through one single day.

Cunningham's novel's title The Hours was the original working title Woolf used for Mrs. Dalloway.

== Plot summary ==
In 1941, Virginia Woolf drowns herself in the River Ouse, Sussex, England. Even as she drowns, she marvels at everyday sights and sounds. Leonard Woolf, her husband, finds her suicide note, and Virginia's body floats downstream, where life continues as normal.

In New York City at the end of the 20th century, Clarissa Vaughan announces she will buy flowers for a party she is hosting later in the day for her friend Richard, a renowned poet who is dying of an AIDS-related illness, because he has won the Carrouthers Prize, an esteemed poetry prize. Clarissa leaves her partner Sally to walk to the flower shop, enjoying the everyday life of the city. The sights and sounds she encounters trigger her thoughts about life, what she loves, and her past. Clarissa bumps into Walter, an acquaintance who writes gay pulp fiction romances. Clarissa invites him to the party, although she knows this will upset Richard. Clarissa continues on her way and arrives at the flower shop.

In 1923, Virginia Woolf wakes one morning with the possible first line of a new novel. She picks up her pen and writes: "Mrs. Dalloway said she would buy the flowers herself."

In 1949 in Los Angeles, Laura Brown reads the first line of Woolf's novel Mrs. Dalloway. Laura is pregnant with her second child and is reading in bed on her husband Dan's birthday. She goes downstairs and decides to make a cake for Dan's birthday that her son Richie will help her make.

Clarissa Vaughan, having left the flower shop with an armload of flowers, decides to visit Richard's apartment. On her way, she pauses at the site of a film shoot, hoping to catch a glimpse of a movie star. She leaves, having not seen the star and embarrassed at her trivial impulses. Clarissa enters a neighborhood she and Richard frequented as young adults. It is revealed Richard and Clarissa once had a failed romantic relationship, despite Richard's "deepest longings" being for Louis, with whom he was already in a relationship. Clarissa enters Richard's apartment building, which she finds squalid and associates with a sense of decay and death.

Richard welcomes Clarissa, calling her "Mrs. D", a reference to Mrs. Dalloway. As Richard's closest friend, Clarissa has taken on the role of a caregiver through his illness. Richard is struggling with what Clarissa assumes to be mental illness, brought about by his AIDS, and tells Clarissa he is hearing voices. Clarissa leaves, promising to return that afternoon to help him prepare for the party.

Two hours have passed since Virginia began writing the start of Mrs. Dalloway. Reflecting on the uncertainty of the artistic process, she decides she has written enough for the day. Virginia goes to the printing room, where Leonard and an assistant are at work. She senses from the assistant Ralph's demeanor Leonard has just scolded him for inefficiency. Virginia announces she is going for a walk and will then help with the work.

Laura Brown makes Dan's birthday cake with Richie's help. She fluctuates between intense love for, and annoyance with, Richie.

Virginia Woolf is taking her walk while thinking of ideas for her novel. She already believes Clarissa Dalloway will die by suicide and plans for Dalloway to have had one true love, a girl she knew during her childhood. Virginia plans for Clarissa to kill herself in middle age over something trivial. Virginia longs to return home; she is aware she is more susceptible to mental illness in London, but would rather die "raving mad" in the city than avoid life in Richmond. As Virginia returns home she feels she is impersonating herself in an effort to convince herself and others she is sane so Leonard will agree to move back to London.

Clarissa Vaughan enters her apartment. Her partner Sally, a television producer, is leaving for a lunch meeting with a film star. As Clarissa prepares for the party, she thinks of the famous actor Sally is lunching with, a B-movie action star who recently came out as gay. She thinks of a holiday she had with Louis and Richard when she was eighteen, a time when anything seemed possible. She wonders what might have happened if she had tried to remain with Richard.

Laura's cake is complete but she is not happy with it. Laura plans the rest of the day; she will prepare for Dan's party. Kitty, Laura's neighbor, arrives at the door. She notices Laura's amateur efforts at making a cake. Laura remembers Kitty has remained childless despite her desire to have children.

The two women drink coffee; Kitty says she must stay in hospital for a few days and wants Laura to feed her dog. Laura moves to comfort Kitty with an embrace. Both women hold each other; Laura kisses Kitty's forehead and the two women kiss each other on the lips. Kitty pulls away and Laura panics when she realizes Richie, has been watching them. Kitty leaves, forgetting her momentary lapse of character. Their kiss is never mentioned; she rejects Laura's continued overtures of help and leaves. Laura attends to her son and dumps her freshly made cake in the bin. She will make another cake.

As Virginia helps Leonard and Ralph with the printing press, a servant announces Virginia's sister has arrived. Vanessa Bell, Virginia's sister, is one-and-a-half hours early. Leonard refuses to stop working so Virginia attends to Vanessa alone. Virginia and Vanessa go into the garden, where Vanessa's children have found a dying bird. As she watches Vanessa's children, Virginia believes the real accomplishment in life is not her "experiments in the narrative" but the producing of children, which Vanessa has achieved. The bird has died and the children, assisted by the adults, hold a funeral for it. As Virginia stares at the dead bird she has an epiphany: her character, Clarissa Dalloway, is not like Virginia and would not die by suicide.

As Clarissa prepares for Richard's party, she is visited by Richard's former partner Louis, and is thrown off-kilter by the visit.

== Characters ==
1923

- Virginia Woolf;
- Leonard Woolf, Virginia's husband;
- Vanessa Bell, Virginia's sister.
- Nelly Boxall, Virginia and Leonard's cook.
- Julian, Quentin and Angelica, Vanessa's children.

1949

- Laura Brown;
- Dan Brown, Laura's husband;
- Richie Brown, Laura's son;
- Kitty, her neighbour.
- Mrs Latch, babysitter.

1999

- Clarissa Vaughan; a 52-year-old publisher.
- Sally, Clarissa's partner;
- Richard Brown, Clarissa's friend, Laura Brown's son;
- Louis Waters, Richard's former lover, friend of Richard and Clarissa;
- Julia Vaughan, Clarissa's daughter;
- Mary Krull, Julia's friend.

== Major themes ==
=== Sexuality ===
The Hours concerns three generations of questionably lesbian or bisexual women. Virginia Woolf was known to have affairs with women; Laura Brown kisses Kitty in her kitchen; and Clarissa Vaughan, who was previously Richard's lover, is in a relationship with Sally. Peripheral characters also exhibit a variety of sexual orientations.

=== Patterns of three ===
Apart from the novel's three female protagonists, and the three symbiotic storylines that they appear in, there are other examples in the novel where Cunningham patterns his story on groups of three. The most-conspicuous of these is the three-way relationship between Clarissa, Richard and Louis when they were three students on holiday together. In the "Mrs Woolf" storyline there is a factual grouping of three in Vanessa's children, Quentin, Julian, and Angelica, who come with their mother to visit Virginia. There is also the family of Laura Brown, her husband Dan and their son Richie. Michael Cunningham confirmed his preoccupation with the number three in a televised interview with Charlie Rose.

== Trivia ==
- On her way to Richard's apartment, Clarissa Vaughan thinks she sees Meryl Streep, who played Clarissa in Stephen Daldry's movie adaptation of The Hours. In the book, Clarissa considers the actor she sees might also have been Vanessa Redgrave, who played Clarissa Dalloway in the 1997 film version of Mrs Dalloway.
- According to Streep in The Hours DVD commentary, Redgrave's daughter Natasha Richardson sent Streep a copy of the novel. Richardson apparently felt Streep might enjoy reading about her fictional self in the novel.
- Mrs Brown is a character in Virginia Woolf's essay, "Mr. Bennett and Mrs. Brown".

== Adaptations ==
- The Hours (2002), film directed by Stephen Daldry, with the screenplay written by David Hare and starring Meryl Streep , Julianne Moore and Nicole Kidman.
- The Hours: A Live Tribute (2016), short film directed by Tim McNeill.
- Kevin Puts adapted the novel into an opera of the same name and a libretto by Greg Pierce, premiering in concert with the Philadelphia Orchestra in 2022, followed by its stage premiere at the Metropolitan Opera later that year, featuring Renée Fleming, Kelli O'Hara, Joyce DiDonato, directed by Phelim McDermott.
