= Karin Wolverton =

American operatic soprano

Karin Wolverton (born 1974, Roseville, Minnesota) is an American operatic soprano. A graduate of the University of Minnesota, she has performed several roles with the Minnesota Opera, including Antonia in Les contes d'Hoffmann, Donna Anna in Don Giovanni, Donna Ines in Maria Padilla and both Mimi and Musetta in La bohème among others. With that company she created the role of Anna Sorenson in the world premiere of Kevin Puts' Pulitzer Prize-winning opera Silent Night in 2011. That performance was filmed and broadcast nationally on PBS in 2013.

In 2014 Wolverton made her debut with the Tulsa Opera as Micäela in Bizet's Carmen. In 2015 she performed the role of Fiordiligi in Mozart's Così fan tutte with the Utah Opera, Donna Elvira in Don Giovanni with the Austin Lyric Opera, and returned to Tulsa as Mimi in La bohème. Other opera companies she has performed leading roles with include the Central City Opera, the Des Moines Metro Opera, the Pensacola Opera, the Pittsburgh Opera, and the Rubén Darío National Theatre in Nicaragua.

On the concert stage Wolverton has performed regularly with the Minnesota Orchestra, including performances of Pamina in The Magic Flute, the Mother in Amahl and the Night Visitors, and Carl Nielsen's Symphony No. 3, the latter of which was performed at Carnegie Hall in New York City. In 2014 she was the soprano soloist in Carmina Burana with the Pennsylvania Ballet and performed Knoxville: Summer of 1915 with Orchestra Seattle. Her performances include concerts with the Chippewa Valley Symphony, Dayton Philharmonic, Discovery Ensemble, New Hampshire Music Festival, the Rochester Symphony Orchestra, Saint Paul Chamber Orchestra, St. Cloud Symphony Orchestra, and Wayzata Symphony Orchestra among others.
