= Three Guineas =

1938 book-length essay by Virginia Woolf

- First edition
- Author: Virginia Woolf
- Cover artist: Vanessa Bell
- Language: English
- Publisher: Hogarth Press
- Publication date: 1938
- Publication place: United Kingdom
- Pages: 285 pp.
- OCLC: 1304213

Three Guineas is a book-length essay by Virginia Woolf, published in June 1938.

== Background ==
Although Three Guineas is a work of non-fiction, it was initially conceived as a "novel–essay" which would tie up the loose ends left in her earlier work, A Room of One's Own. However, Woolf eventually split the project into the novel The Years and the essay Three Guineas.

== Structure and overview ==
The entire essay is structured as a response to an educated gentleman who has written a letter asking Woolf to join his efforts to help prevent war. War was looming in 1936–7 and the question was particularly pressing to Woolf, a committed pacifist. In the gentleman's letter (he is never named), he asks Woolf her opinion about how best to prevent war and offers some practical steps. Woolf opens her response by stating first, and with some slight hyperbole, that this is "a remarkable letter—a letter perhaps unique in the history of human correspondence, since when before has an educated man asked a woman how in her opinion war can be prevented." Despite the remarkable nature of the letter, Woolf has left it unanswered because as the daughter of an educated man, without access or place in the public world of professions, universities, societies, and government, she fears that there are fundamental differences that will make her "impossible for [educated men] to understand." This sets up the fundamental tension of the work between, on the one hand, the desire to leave behind the stifling private home so as to help prevent war, an aim that Woolf certainly shares with her interlocutor, and, on the other, an unwillingness to simply ally with the public world of men. "Behind us lies the patriarchal system; the private house, with its nullity, its immorality, its hypocrisy, its servility. Before us lies the public world, the professional system, with its possessiveness, its jealousy, its pugnacity, its greed."

In the course of responding to the educated man's questions and practical suggestions, Woolf turns to two other letters: a request for funds to help rebuild a woman's college and a request for support for an organisation to help women enter the professions (professional life). Both allow Woolf to articulate her criticisms of the structure of education and the professions, which mostly involves showing how they encourage the very attitudes that lead to Fascism both at home and abroad. Woolf does not refute the values of education and public service outright but suggests conditions which the daughters of educated men will need to heed if they are to prevent being corrupted by the public order. She imagines, for example, a new kind of college that avoids teaching the tools of domination and pugnacity, "an experimental college, an adventurous college…. It should teach… the art of understanding other people's lives and minds…. The teachers should be drawn from the good livers as well as from the good thinkers."

In the final section, Woolf returns from the topics of education and the professions to the larger questions of preventing war and the practical measure suggested for doing so. In it she argues that although she agrees with her interlocutor that war is evil, they must attempt to eradicate it in different ways. "And since we are different," Woolf concludes, "our help must be different."

== Themes ==
Woolf wrote the essay as an answer to three questions, each from a different society:

- From an anti-war society: "How should war be prevented?"
- From a women's college building fund: "Why does the government not support education for women?" (Actually, the fund was a metaphor for family private funds to send the "boys of the family" to college and not the women.)
- From a society promoting employment of professional women: "Why are women not allowed to engage in professional work?"

The book is composed as Woolf's responses to a series of letters. The epistolary format gives the reader the sense of eavesdropping on a private conversation, and the question and answer format creates a sense of dialogue and debate on the politically charged issues the essay tackles, rather than just presenting simple polemical diatribes on each topic. The principle of dialogue is one that informs much of Woolf's work, and is also seen in her novels when she gives voice to different classes and marginalised groups in society through a diversity of characterisations. For example, the sky-writing scene in Mrs. Dalloway includes characters with a variety of class-influenced dialects. The "guineas" of the book's title are themselves a badge of social class, the money amount of 21 shillings (1.05 pounds sterling) for which no coin any longer existed, but which was still the common denomination for solely upper-class transactions (e.g., purchase of pictures or race-horses, lawyers' or medical specialists' fees, and so on.). She wrote "It is much to be regretted that no lives of maids … are to be found in the Dictionary of National Biography" which her father had created. (In time her servant Nellie Boxall would be included in its successor.)

Woolf was eager to tie the issues of war and feminism together in what she saw as a crucial point in history. She and her husband Leonard had visited both Nazi Germany and Fascist Italy in the early part of the decade.

== Reception ==
=== Contemporary responses ===
Q. D. Leavis (literary critic) wrote a scathing critique of Three Guineas shortly after its publication in 1938. She denounces the essay because it is only concerned with "the daughters of educated men", seeing Woolf's criticisms as irrelevant to most women because her wealth and aristocratic ancestry means she is "insulated by class". Elsewhere Three Guineas was better received. Woolf reports a favourable response in her diary of 7 May 1938. "I am pleased this morning because Lady Rhonda writes that she is profoundly excited and moved by Three Guineas. Theo Bosanquet, who has a review copy, read her extracts. And she thinks it may have a great effect, and signs herself my grateful outsider."

=== Recent responses ===
The views expressed in Three Guineas have been described as feminist, pacifist, anti-fascist, and anti-imperialist. Feminist historian Jill Liddington has praised Three Guineas as "an eloquent and impish attack on patriarchal structures", notes how the book puts forward the argument that "men's power under patriarchy dovetails with militarism", and claims "Three Guineas offers an important bridge between the earlier feminist flowering and the later 1980s wave of a women's peace movement".

In 2002, City Journal published a critique of Three Guineas by the conservative essayist Theodore Dalrymple, "The Rage of Virginia Woolf" (later reprinted in Dalrymple's anthology, Our Culture, What's Left of It), in which Dalrymple contended that the book is "a locus classicus of self-pity and victimhood as a genre in itself" and that "the book might be better titled: How to Be Privileged and Yet Feel Extremely Aggrieved". In response, Woolf scholar Elizabeth Shih defended Three Guineas and claimed Dalrymple's article was full of "ad hominem moments". Shih argued that Dalrymple "obtusely and consistently misreads Woolf's hyperbole", interpreting literally Woolf's comments about burning male-dominated colleges, and Woolf's likening women using their sexuality to control men to prostitution. Shih also criticised Dalrymple's attacks on Woolf's anti-militarism and her calls for working-class education. Shih suggested Dalrymple's objection to Three Guineas was due to his opposition to Woolf's "politicization of the private lives of women".
