= The Hours (film) =

2002 film by Stephen Daldry

- Theatrical release poster
- Directed by: Stephen Daldry
- Screenplay by: David Hare
- Based on: The Hours; 1998 novel by Michael Cunningham
- Produced by: Scott Rudin; Robert Fox
- Starring: Meryl Streep; Julianne Moore; Nicole Kidman; Ed Harris; Toni Collette; Claire Danes; Jeff Daniels; Stephen Dillane; Allison Janney; John C. Reilly; Miranda Richardson
- Cinematography: Seamus McGarvey
- Edited by: Peter Boyle
- Music by: Philip Glass
- Production companies: Miramax Films; Scott Rudin Productions
- Distributed by: Paramount Pictures (North America); Miramax International (international) (Note: Since the acquisition of Miramax by ViacomCBS (now Paramount Skydance), Paramount owns the worldwide rights to the movie.)
- Release date: December 25, 2002 (United States)
- Running time: 114 minutes
- Countries: United States; United Kingdom
- Language: English
- Budget: $25 million
- Box office: $108.8 million

The Hours is a 2002 psychological period drama film directed by Stephen Daldry from a screenplay by David Hare, based on the 1998 novel by Michael Cunningham. It stars Nicole Kidman, Julianne Moore, and Meryl Streep as three women whose lives are connected by Virginia Woolf's 1925 novel Mrs Dalloway. In 2001 New York, Clarissa Vaughan (Streep) prepares an award party for her AIDS-stricken friend and poet, Richard (Ed Harris). In 1951 California, Laura Brown (Moore) is a pregnant housewife in an unhappy marriage. In 1920s England, Virginia Woolf (Kidman) battles with depression while writing Mrs Dalloway. Supporting roles are played by John C. Reilly, Stephen Dillane, Jeff Daniels, Miranda Richardson, Allison Janney, Toni Collette, Claire Danes, and Eileen Atkins.

The Hours premiered in Los Angeles and New York City on Christmas Day 2002 and was given a limited release by Paramount Pictures in the United States two days later, with Miramax International releasing in other territories, before expanding in January 2003. A commercial success, it grossed $108.8 million on a $25 million production budget, and received generally favorable reviews with praise towards the performances of the lead trio. At the 75th Academy Awards, it received nine nominations, including Best Picture, with Kidman winning Best Actress. The film and novel were adapted into an opera in 2022.

In 2025, the film was selected for preservation in the United States National Film Registry by the Library of Congress as being "culturally, historically or aesthetically significant."

== Plot ==
In 1941, author Virginia Woolf died by suicide by placing rocks in her pocket and drowning in a river. The rest of the film takes place within the span of a single day in three different years and alternates among them.

In 1923, Woolf has begun writing the book Mrs. Dalloway at her home in Richmond outside London. Virginia, who has experienced several nervous breakdowns and suffers from recurring bouts of severe depression, feels trapped in her home, intimidated by servants and constantly under the eye of her husband, Leonard, who has begun a publishing business at home to stay close to her. Woolf both welcomes and dreads an afternoon visit from her sister Vanessa and her children. After their departure, Virginia flees to the railway station where she is awaiting a train to central London when Leonard arrives to bring her home. He tells her how he lives in constant fear that she will take her own life. She says she fears it also, but argues that if she is to live, she has the right to decide how and where, as much as any other person. In 1941, Virginia dies by suicide by drowning in the River Ouse.

In 1951, troubled Los Angeles housewife Laura Brown is pregnant with her second child and spends her days in her tract home with her young son, Richie. She married her husband, Dan, soon after World War II and on the surface they are living the American Dream, but she is deeply unhappy. She and Richie make a cake for Dan's birthday, but it is a disaster. Her neighbor Kitty drops in to ask her if she can feed her dog while she's in the hospital for a procedure. Kitty pretends to be upbeat, but Laura senses her fear and boldly kisses her on the lips. Kitty accepts the kiss without comment, and both women ignore any hidden meaning it might have. Laura and Richie successfully make another cake. She then takes him to stay with her friend Mrs. Latch. He is terrified of being left without her, although she insists she will be back. She checks into a hotel where she intends to take her own life. She removes several bottles of pills and Woolf's novel from her purse, and begins to read Mrs. Dalloway. She drifts off to sleep and dreams the hotel room is flooding, awakening with a change of heart. She picks up Richie and they return home to celebrate Dan's birthday.

In 2001, New Yorker Clarissa Vaughan spends the day preparing for a party she is hosting in honor of her friend Richard, a poet and author living with AIDS who is about to receive a career achievement award. Clarissa, who Richard frequently refers to as Mrs. Dalloway, is concerned about his depression. Although Clarissa herself is a lesbian who has been living with partner Sally Lester for 10 years, she and Richard were lovers during their college days. He has spent the better part of his life in gay relationships, including one with Louis Waters, who left him several years prior, but who returns for the festivities. Clarissa's daughter, Julia, comes home to help her prepare for the evening's event. Eventually Richard tells Clarissa he has stayed alive solely for her sake, and the award is meaningless because he didn't get it until he was on the brink of death. Having taken several pills, he tells Clarissa, shortly before jumping to his death from a window, she is the best thing he ever had. Later that night, Laura, who is revealed to be Richard's mother, arrives at Clarissa's apartment. Although it is clear that Laura's abandonment was a profound trauma for him, she feels it was better to leave her husband and children rather than take their own life.

== Cast ==
1923

- Nicole Kidman as Virginia Woolf
- Stephen Dillane as Leonard Woolf
- Miranda Richardson as Vanessa Bell
- George Loftus as Quentin Bell
- Charley Ramm as Julian Bell
- Sophie Wyburd as Angelica Bell
- Lyndsey Marshal as Lottie Hope
- Linda Bassett as Nelly Boxall

1951

- Julianne Moore as Laura Brown
- John C. Reilly as Dan Brown
- Jack Rovello as Richard "Richie" Brown
- Toni Collette as Kitty
- Margo Martindale as Mrs. Latch

2001

- Meryl Streep as Clarissa Vaughan
- Ed Harris as Richard "Richie" Brown
- Allison Janney as Sally Lester
- Claire Danes as Julia Vaughan
- Jeff Daniels as Louis Waters
- Eileen Atkins as Barbara
- Julianne Moore as Older Laura Brown

== Reception ==
=== Box office ===
The Hours opened in New York City and Los Angeles on Christmas Day 2002 and went into limited release in the United States and Canada two days later. It grossed $1,070,856 on eleven screens in its first two weeks of release. On January 10, 2003, it expanded to 45 screens and the following week it expanded to 402. On February 14, it went into wide release, playing in 1,003 theaters in the US and Canada. With an estimated budget of $25 million, the film eventually earned $41,675,994 in the US and Canada and $67,170,078 in foreign markets for a total worldwide box office of $108,846,072. It was the 47th highest-grossing film of 2002.

=== Critical response ===
On the review aggregation website Rotten Tomatoes, 80% of 196 critics gave the film a positive review and an average rating of 7.4/10. The site's critics consensus reads, "The movie may be a downer, but it packs an emotional wallop. Some fine acting on display here." On Metacritic, the film has a weighted average score of 80 out of 100, based on 40 critics, indicating "generally favorable reviews". Audiences surveyed by CinemaScore gave the film an average grade of "B−" on an A+ to F scale.

Richard Schickel of Time criticized the film's simplistic characterization, saying, "Watching The Hours, one finds oneself focusing excessively on the unfortunate prosthetic nose Kidman affects in order to look more like the novelist. And wondering why the screenwriter, David Hare, and the director, Stephen Daldry, turn Woolf, a woman of incisive mind, into a hapless ditherer." He also criticized its overt politicization: "But this movie is in love with female victimization. Moore's Laura is trapped in the suburban flatlands of the '50s, while Streep's Clarissa is moored in a hopeless love for Laura's homosexual son (Ed Harris, in a truly ugly performance), an AIDS sufferer whose relentless anger is directly traceable to Mom's long-ago desertion of him. Somehow, despite the complexity of the film's structure, this all seems too simple-minded. Or should we perhaps say agenda-driven? This ultimately proves insufficient to lend meaning to their lives or profundity to a grim and uninvolving film, for which Philip Glass unwittingly provides the perfect score—tuneless, oppressive, droning, painfully self-important."

Stephen Holden of The New York Times called the film "deeply moving" and "an amazingly faithful screen adaptation" and added, "Although suicide eventually tempts three of the film's characters, The Hours is not an unduly morbid film. Clear-eyed and austerely balanced would be a more accurate description, along with magnificently written and acted. Mr. Glass's surging minimalist score, with its air of cosmic abstraction, serves as ideal connective tissue for a film that breaks down temporal barriers." Mick LaSalle of the San Francisco Chronicle observed, "Director Stephen Daldry employs the wonderful things cinema can do in order to realize aspects of The Hours that Cunningham could only hint at or approximate on the page. The result is something rare, especially considering how fine the novel is, a film that's fuller and deeper than the book ... It's marvelous to watch the ways in which [David Hare] consistently dramatizes the original material without compromising its integrity or distorting its intent ... Cunningham's [novel] touched on notes of longing, middle-aged angst and the sense of being a small consciousness in the midst of a grand mystery. But Daldry and Hare's [film] sounds those notes and sends audiences out reverberating with them, exalted."

Peter Travers of Rolling Stone awarded the film, which he thought "sometimes stumbles on literary pretensions", three out of four stars. He praised the performances, commenting, "Kidman's acting is superlative, full of passion and feeling ... Moore is wrenching in her scenes with Laura's son (Jack Rovello, an exceptional child actor). And Streep is a miracle worker, building a character in the space between words and worlds. These three unimprovable actresses make The Hours a thing of beauty."

Philip French of The Observer called it "a moving, somewhat depressing film that demands and rewards attention." He thought "the performances are remarkable" but found the Philip Glass score to be "relentless" and "over-amplified". Steve Persall of the St. Petersburg Times said it "is the most finely crafted film of the past year that I never want to sit through again. The performances are flawless, the screenplay is intelligently crafted, and the overall mood is relentlessly bleak. It is a film to be admired, not embraced, and certainly not to be enjoyed for any reason other than its expertise." Peter Bradshaw of The Guardian rated the film three out of five stars and commented, "It is a daring act of extrapolation, and a real departure from most movie-making, which can handle only one universe at a time ... The performances that Daldry elicits ... are all strong: tightly managed, smoothly and dashingly juxtaposed under a plangent score ... Part of the bracing experimental impact of the film was the absence of narrative connection between the three women. Supplying one in the final reel undermines its formal daring, but certainly packs an emotional punch. It makes for an elegant and poignant chamber music of the soul."

In 2025, it was one of the films voted for the "Readers' Choice" edition of The New York Times' list of "The 100 Best Movies of the 21st Century", finishing at number 300.

== Soundtrack ==
The film's score by Philip Glass won the BAFTA Award for Best Film Music and was nominated for the Academy Award for Best Original Score and the Golden Globe Award for Best Original Score. The soundtrack album was nominated for the Grammy Award for Best Score Soundtrack Album for a Motion Picture, Television or Other Visual Media.
