= The Hours (opera) =

2022 opera by Kevin Puts

- Opera by Kevin Puts
- Promotional poster with Kelli O'Hara, Joyce DiDonato, and Renée Fleming
- Librettist: Greg Pierce
- Language: English
- Based on: The Hours (novel) by Michael Cunningham; The Hours (film), written by David Hare and directed by Stephen Daldry
- Premiere: 22 November 2022; The Metropolitan Opera House, New York City

The Hours is a 2022 opera in two acts with music by Kevin Puts and an English-language libretto by Greg Pierce, based on Michael Cunningham's 1998 novel and its 2002 film adaptation, both with the same title.

The opera was first performed on 18 March 2022 in a concert presentation at the Kimmel Center in Philadelphia and received its stage premiere on 22 November 2022 at the Metropolitan Opera House in New York City. The stage premiere was audio-streamed at the Met Opera website, and the performance of 10 December was presented in movie theaters as a part of the Metropolitan Opera Live in HD series.

== Genesis ==
The idea for the opera arose from a conversation between soprano Renée Fleming and composer Kevin Puts when they were collaborating on his 2019 song cycle The Brightness of Light. Someone in Fleming's office suggested Michael Cunningham's novel, and they both thought this was the right choice. The opera was commissioned by New York's Metropolitan Opera and the Philadelphia Orchestra. Greg Pierce, who wrote the libretto for the 2016 opera Fellow Travelers, as well as the lyrics of two musicals with John Kander, The Landing (2013) and Kid Victory (2015), was hired to write the libretto. In an interview with NPR, Pierce stated: "The Met is a very big space. It's got a massive chorus, a big orchestra. Why not make use of all of that? You could do an Hours that's really intimate, a chamber piece. That's not what we wanted to do." A lot of the book consists of a stream of consciousness, that is character's thoughts and perceptions, "and the idea that they [the chorus] could potentially go in and out of the minds of these main characters and argue with them, they could be in inner argument – it was really exciting to us", Pierce said.

== Performance history ==
The Hours was first performed on 18 March 2022 in a preview concert presentation at the Kimmel Center by the Philadelphia Orchestra under its conductor Yannick Nézet-Séguin. The singers included Renée Fleming as Clarissa Vaughan, Jennifer Johnson Cano as Virginia Woolf, Kelli O'Hara as Laura Brown, Brett Polegato as Richard, Jamez McCorkle as Leonard Woolf, Deborah Nansteel as Sally, and Brandon Cedel as Dan. Nézet-Séguin, who is also the music director of the Metropolitan Opera, conducted the stage premiere at that company's house on 22 November 2022, in a production by Phelim McDermott. The set and costume designer was Tom Pye, and the choreographer was Annie-B Parson. According to Jeff Lunden, writing for NPR, "the chorus and dancers are constantly onstage, helping to underline the central characters' emotional states." The company performed the opera eight times as part of their 2022–23 season. The premiere was broadcast on Metropolitan Opera Radio on SiriusXM and audio-streamed at metopera.org. The performance of 10 December was video-cast to movie theatres as part of the Metropolitan Opera Live in HD series and telecast on 17 March 2023 by PBS as part of the Great Performances at the Met series.

== Roles ==
Roles, voice types, premiere cast
Role	Voice type	Premiere cast, 22 November 2022 Conductor: Yannick Nézet-Séguin
Clarissa Vaughan, book editor	soprano	Renée Fleming
Virginia Woolf, novelist of Mrs. Dalloway	mezzo-soprano	Joyce DiDonato
Laura Brown, housewife and mother	soprano	Kelli O'Hara
Richard, Clarissa's friend	baritone	Kyle Ketelsen
Sally, Clarissa's partner	mezzo-soprano	Denyce Graves
Richie, Laura's son	boy soprano	Kai Edgar
Leonard Woolf, Virginia's husband	tenor	Sean Panikkar
Dan Brown, Laura's husband	bass-baritone	Brandon Cedel
Louis, Richard's former lover	tenor	William Burden
Walter, writer of gay romance novels	tenor	Tony Stevenson
Barbara, florist	soprano	Kathleen Kim
Kitty, Laura's neighbor	soprano	Sylvia D'Eramo
Man Under the Arch	countertenor	John Holiday
Nelly, Virginia and Leonard's cook	mezzo-soprano	Eve Gigliotti
Vanessa, Virginia's sister	soprano	Sylvia D'Eramo
Hotel Clerk	countertenor	John Holiday
Mrs. Latch, Richie's babysitter	soprano	Kathleen Kim
Julian, Vanessa's older son		Atticus Ware
Quentin, Vanessa's younger son		Patrick Scott McDermott
Angelica, Vanessa's daughter		Lena Josephine Marano
Mrs. Dalloway, title character in Virginia's novel	(a dancer)	
Septimus Warren Smith, character in Virginia's novel, a shell-shocked veteran of World War I	(a dancer)	
Chorus and dancers

== Instrumentation ==
The instrumentation is from the composer's website:

- Woodwinds: 3 flutes (3rd doubling piccolo, alto flute in G), 2 oboes, English horn in F, 3 clarinets in B♭ (3rd doubling E♭ clarinet, bass clarinet in B♭), alto saxophone in E♭, 3 bassoons (3rd doubling contrabassoon)
- Brass: 4 horns in F, 3 trumpets in C (1st doubling piccolo trumpet in B♭), 2 trombones, bass trombone, tuba
- Percussion: timpani, other percussion (4 players)
- Other: piano (doubling celesta), 2 harps
- Strings: violins, violas, cellos, double basses

== Synopsis ==
The story is about a single day in the lives of three women: book editor Clarissa Vaughan in New York's West Village in 1999; novelist Virginia Woolf in Richmond, England, in 1923; and housewife and mother Laura Brown in Los Angeles in 1949.

=== Act 1 ===
The chorus sings fragments of the opening line of Virginia's novel Mrs. Dalloway (the working title of which was The Hours): "Mrs. Dalloway said she would buy the flowers herself."

Clarissa and her partner Sally are preparing their apartment for a party in honor of Clarissa's best friend, Richard, who later that day is intended to receive an award for his recently published novel. Richard is seriously ill with AIDS, and Sally questions whether he will be able to come. Clarissa insists he will be able to attend. Clarissa goes out to buy flowers at a nearby shop. On her way she passes through Washington Square and notices the unusual singing of a Man Under the Arch. By chance, she encounters Walter, a writer of gay romances who knows Richard and whom she invites to the party. Walter also expresses doubt that Richard is well enough to attend the party.

In her house in the London suburb of Richmond, Virginia has awakened and entered her office, anxious to begin her new novel. Her husband Leonard, a proof editor, is concerned about her health and tries to get her to eat some breakfast, but she refuses. She considers the many roles he plays in her life.

Clarissa arrives at the flower shop, and the florist Barbara kisses her on the mouth. Clarissa briefly imagines what it would be like if Barbara and she were lovers and they would never need to leave the shop. She finds the flowers she wants and departs for Richard's apartment.

In her office, Virginia finds it difficult to begin her novel and thinks of central London and its many diversions, so different from her drab existence in suburban Richmond. Overcoming her hesitation, she starts to write.

In Los Angeles in her bed, Laura Brown is reading the same lines from Mrs. Dalloway. She feels guilty that she is avoiding her duties as a wife and mother. Although it is her husband Dan's birthday, and he and their six-year-old son Richie are waiting for her in the kitchen, she resumes reading. Eventually, she goes down to the kitchen, where Dan and Richie express worries about her. Dan leaves for work.

Clarissa considers whether her relationship of almost eighteen years with Sally is fulfilling enough. Virginia cannot decide which of the characters in her novel will die. Laura allows Richie to help her bake Dan's birthday cake, even though Richie will surely spoil it, and feels even her efforts are inadequate.

Clarissa stops on the street on her way to Richard's and remembers the time she casually broke off their romantic relationship with simple, thoughtless words. She wonders what might have been if she had not done so.

She enters Richard's apartment to remind him of the party but finds him weak and forgetful. He calls her Mrs. Dalloway, since her first name is the same as the novel's main character. She dislikes the nickname because it is such a tragic story. He says he is unable to attend the party, but Clarissa reproaches him for not making more of an effort. He confesses he still fantasizes about whether they could have been lovers. Clarissa says she needs to leave and return to her apartment to put the flowers in water so they will not wilt.

In her kitchen, Laura is unhappy with the progress of the cake.

Virginia asks her cook Nelly whether a young girl who started the day happily could decide to commit suicide. Nelly says, if the girl became despairing, it was possible. Virginia engages in a suicidal fantasy, foreseeing her death.

Kitty unexpectedly visits Laura. The doctor has told her she has a growth inside her and needs to look at it. Can Laura feed her dog? Laura is sorry for Kitty, feels tenderness for her, and holds her. They touch their lips together, but after a moment Kitty pulls away.

Virginia, who has become anxious, stops writing and goes outdoors. Clarissa enters her apartment. Sally is thinking about how to arrange the chairs. Clarissa, worried about Richard, decides to go back to see him. Virginia, wanting to escape Richmond, considers whether to take the train to London or drown herself in the river. Laura, feeling stifled at home, takes Richie to Mrs. Latch, his sitter, and drives toward Pasadena with no plan.

=== Act 2 ===
Laura enters a room at the Normandy Hotel with her tattered copy of Mrs. Dalloway and a bottle of pills. She recalls a bizarre encounter with the Hotel Clerk. While reading Mrs. Dalloway, she imagines Virginia heading to the river to kill herself. Laura considers suicide. Virginia, distracted by the voice of the Man Under the Arch, is found by Leonard, who expresses his fear of finding her dead and having to tell her sister Vanessa of his failure to save her. Virginia is disturbed by the intensity of his distress.

On her way to Richard's, Clarissa hears a choir singing lyrics seemingly directed at her. In front of Richard's building, she encounters Louis, Richard's former boyfriend, who can't decide whether to visit him. Louis recollects a summer the three of them were in Wellfleet, when he was shut out by their closeness, Richard wanting him only for his body, but wanting Clarissa for everything else.

In her office, Virginia hears children talking and wonders if she's going crazy. In the garden, she finds her sister Vanessa and her three children: Julian, Quentin, and Angelica. Quentin has found a sick bird, which he thinks is still alive. They decide to make a bed of grass for it to die in. Virginia identifies the bird as female because it is "a bit more drab" than the males. She begins making the bed for the bird, adding roses picked from the garden. She realizes the bird is dead and begins manically making the bed, accidentally pricking Angelica's finger with a thorn. Vanessa and her children retreat, realizing the severity of Virginia's illness.

Laura in her hotel room rebukes herself for thinking of suicide when she has a young son and a baby on the way to take care of. She decides to remain alive and return to her obligations as a mother.

Clarissa lets herself into Richard's apartment and finds him on the window sill, five stories above the ground. She attempts to persuade him to come back in. He says he only wanted to write something good, not great. Something that would touch someone. He tells her he loves her, slides off the sill, and falls outside. Clarissa hesitantly peers out the window and realizes he is dead.

Clarissa appears in the street and bends over Richard's lifeless body. The chorus can be heard repeating and reassembling words and thoughts from the day. Laura leaves the hotel. Virginia realizes she is losing her mind.

Laura picks Richie up from the sitter, and he tells her he was scared because he thought, like Kitty, she had something growing inside her.

At their dining table, Virginia expresses her gratitude to Leonard for having given her "the greatest possible happiness."

Dan returns home to his birthday party and tells his family how happy they have made him.

At Sally and Clarissa's, the party has become a wake. Richard's mother, Laura, arrives and reveals she abandoned Dan and Richie and feels regret.

As the others leave, the three female protagonists, Laura, Clarissa, and Virginia sing a trio, realizing that in their connection to one another across different times and places, they are not alone.

== Recording ==
- 2022 (HD video/audio CDs): Renée Fleming as Clarissa Vaughan; Kelli O'Hara as Laura Brown; Joyce Di Donato as Virginia Woolf; William Burden as Louis; Sean Panikkar as Leonard Woolf; Kyle Ketelsen as Richard; Brandon Cedel as Dan Brown; Metropolitan Opera Orchestra, Chorus, and Ballet, conducted by Yannick Nézet-Séguin; Phelim McDermott (producer); Tom Pye (set and costume designer); Annie-B Parson (choreographer); Finn Ross (projection designer); Gary Halvorson (video director); Christine Baranski (host); recorded live at the Metropolitan Opera House on 10 December 2022; streaming HD video at Met Opera on Demand; audio, streaming and CDs, released in 2024 on Erato.
