= Kelly O'Hara =

Kelly O'Hara may refer to:

- Kelli O'Hara (born 1976), American actress and singer
- Kelley O'Hara (born 1988), American soccer player
