= Kathleen Kim =

American opera singer

Kathleen Kim is a Korean operatic coloratura soprano. Her repertoire includes roles in operas by Handel, Mozart, Donizetti, Verdi, and Offenbach, among others, as well as in oratorios such as the Messiah and sacred works such as Mozart's Great Mass in C minor.

== Education ==
Kim was raised in Seoul, South Korea, where she sang in the children's chorus of the national broadcasting company. "I was on TV every Sunday, singing, and I loved it." She studied classical voice with Fa Park. In 1994, Kim left for the United States during her second year at Seoul Arts High School and enrolled at the Manhattan School of Music, receiving a Bachelor of Music degree in 1998 and a Master's in 2000.

She is also a graduate of the Ryan Opera Center of the Lyric Opera of Chicago. During her training, she appeared in various operatic roles, including Adele in Die Fledermaus, the First Priestess in Iphigénie en Tauride, the page in Rigoletto, the milliner in Der Rosenkavalier, and Frasquita in Carmen. Kim attended the Music Academy of the West in 2004.

== Career ==
Kim made her debut at the Metropolitan Opera in New York in 2007 as Barbarina in Mozart's The Marriage of Figaro and since then sang at the Met in the roles of Olympia in Les contes d'Hoffmann, Zerbinetta in Ariadne auf Naxos, Oscar in Un ballo in maschera, and Blonde in Die Entführung aus dem Serail. She sang the role of Chiang Ch'ing in the Met's premiere of John Adams's Nixon in China in 2011 and the roles of Barbara and Mrs. Latch in the Met's world stage premiere of Kevin Puts' The Hours in 2022.

Since her professional debut, Kim has sung with major opera companies in numerous theatres across the world, including the Lyric Opera of Chicago, the Gran Teatre del Liceu, the Bayerische Staatsoper, and the Opéra de Lille.

She is an active presence on the concert stage, having been a soloist with the Seoul Philharmonic Orchestra in works such as Mahler's Eighth Symphony and Beethoven's Ninth Symphony.

Kim made several role debuts in 2011, including her first performance in the title role of Donizetti's Lucia di Lammermoor. In 2012, she sang in a performance of Adams's Nixon in China at the BBC Proms, and also sang Mozart's Mass in C minor with the Oslo Philharmonic. In September 2015, she was appointed as a professor of Music College at Hanyang University.

== Awards ==
Kim has been the recipient of many prizes and awards, including an award from the Sullivan Foundation in 2006, the Sarasota Opera Guild's Leo Rogers Scholarship, and the Union League Civic & Arts Foundation's Rose Ann Grund Scholarship. She was the third-prize winner of the Mario Lanza Competition, a prize winner of the Liederkranz Competition, and a national finalist in the MacAllister Awards. At Music Academy of the West, she received the Encouragement Award of the Marilyn Horne Foundation Song Competition.

== Repertoire ==
Kim's repertoire includes the following operatic roles:

- Armida in Handel's Rinaldo at the Central City Opera House
- Blonde in Mozart's Die Entführung aus dem Serail at the Metropolitan Opera and the Minnesota Opera
- Chiang Ch'ing in John Adams's Nixon in China at the Metropolitan Opera, Chicago Opera Theater, and the Washington National Opera
- La Fée in Massenet's Cendrillon at Opéra de Lille and the Metropolitan Opera
- Le Feu, la Princesse and le Rossignol in Ravel's L'enfant et les sortilèges at the Glyndebourne Festival Opera and the Teatro dell'Opera di Roma
- Königin der Nacht in Mozart's Die Zauberflöte
- Lucia in Donizetti's Lucia di Lammermoor at Sarasota Opera
- Marie in Donizetti's La fille du régiment at the Asociación Bilbaína de Amigos de la Ópera in Bilbao
- Melissa in Handel's Amadigi di Gaula at the Central City Opera House
- Mother-in-law in Kaija Saariaho's Innocence at the Metropolitan Opera
- Olympia in Offenbach's Les contes d'Hoffmann at the Metropolitan Opera, the Gran Teatre del Liceu, and the Bayerische Staatsoper
- Oscar in Verdi's Un ballo in maschera at the Metropolitan Opera and the San Diego Opera
- Poppea in Handel's Agrippina at the Boston Lyric Opera
- Tytania in Britten's A Midsummer Night's Dream at the Metropolitan Opera
- Zerbinetta in Strauss's Ariadne auf Naxos at the Metropolitan Opera
