= My Life with Albertine =

Musical

My Life With Albertine
- Original Cast Album Cover
- Music: Ricky Ian Gordon
- Lyrics: Ricky Ian Gordon and Richard Nelson
- Book: Richard Nelson
- Basis: Albertine disparue by Marcel Proust
- Productions: 2003 Off-Broadway

My Life with Albertine is a musical with music and lyrics by Ricky Ian Gordon and book and lyrics Richard Nelson. The story was adapted from parts of the 1913-1927 seven-volume novel In Search of Lost Time by Marcel Proust. It ran Off-Broadway in 2003.

The musical is set in a salle du théâtre (private theatre in a home) in Paris, 1919. For much of the story, the Narrator stands beside a piano and speaks to the audience, as the curtain opens to reveal scenes from his life.

== Production ==
The musical opened Off-Broadway at Playwrights Horizons on February 18, 2003 (previews) officially on March 13, and closed on March 30. The cast starred Kelli O'Hara as Albertine, Brent Carver as older Marcel and the Narrator, and Chad Kimball as young Marcel. The cast featured Donna Lynne Champlin as the grandmother, Emily Skinner as Mlle. Lea, a lesbian cabaret singer, Brooke Sunny Moriber, and Laura Woyasz. Directed by Richard Nelson and choreographed by Sean Curran, scenery was by Thomas Lynch, costumes by Susan Hilferty, lighting by James F. Ingalls, and sound by Scott Lehrer.

The musical received a 2003 nomination for the Drama League Award as Distinguished Production of a Musical. It received two 2003 Lucille Lortel Award nominations: Costume Design (Susan Hilferty) and Lighting Design (James F. Ingalls).

== Synopsis ==
=== Act I ===
A young woman, Albertine, emerges through the curtain holding a letter, which she shares with the audience ("Is It Too Late?"). At its conclusion, the Narrator reveals, "That is the end. I will begin at the beginning — of my life with Albertine."

Marcel first met Albertine in a seaside village during the summer of 1898 ("Balbec-by-the-Sea"). He was only seventeen years old and immediately bewitched by her. Albertine is unlike anyone Marcel has ever encountered. With a black polo-cap pulled down over her forehead, she pushes along a bicycle and swinging her hips confidently. That night, unable to sleep, Marcel begs his Grandmother, with whom he is especially close, to sing him to sleep as she did when he was a child ("Lullaby"). A friend later tells him more about Albertine. She is an orphaned, middle-class girl who lives with her aunt. Intrigued, Marcel follows her down a path to the woods. At first spying on her, he eventually comes out and joins Albertine and her girlfriends in a game ("Ferret Song"). At the end of the summer, Albertine invites him to her hotel room, where he finds her alone and in her nightclothes. She shares with him a passionate poem she has been reading ("My Soul Weeps"), but when he tries to kiss her, she has him thrown out.

Back in Paris, Marcel's Grandmother dies. Feeling alone and adrift, Marcel begins to aimlessly attend adult "society" ("Talk About the Weather") while also trying to compose at the piano. One day Albertine suddenly arrives at his door. Now she allows — even encourages — his advances, and soon she sleeps with him, while the Narrator looks on ("The Different Albertines"). Having gotten what he wanted, Marcel breaks off the affair.

The following summer, Marcel avoids Albertine ("Sad Balbec"). He visits a seedy nightclub ("My Soul Weeps" — Tango) and discovers her dancing closely with another girl. Confused and excited, Marcel invites Albertine to tea at his hotel where they happen across a lesbian couple. Albertine assures him that she is not "that type" and after some hesitation, he believes her. Searching for words to express his feelings, Marcel asks the Narrator for help ("But What I Say"). Act I finishes as the Narrator closes the stage curtain and stands alone ("Song of Solitude")

=== Act II ===
Marcel, Albertine and her friend Andrée visit an outdoor cabaret together featuring Mademoiselle Lea, a well-known lesbian singer ("I Want You"). To Marcel's dismay, Albertine is already acquainted with Lea and is cajoled to offer her own recital ("I Need Me a Girl"). Consumed with jealousy, Marcel takes Albertine back with him to Paris, where he locks her in his apartment. Trying to work, he is distracted by the nearly-nude Albertine as she sleeps on the sofa. When she wakes, the Narrator, Marcel and Albertine again find themselves at a loss for words ("But What I Say" — Reprise). As Albertine runs off to take a bath, Marcel and the Narrator imagine their worst fears coming to life ("Sometimes").

With Albertine out at the theatre, the cries of street vendors inspire Marcel to compose, but his work unravels as his obsession grows ("The Street"). That night, after an argument, Marcel and the Narrator reach a decision, but before he can tell Albertine that she must leave, his maid Françoise informs him that she has gone. Even with her departure, the war between the two Marcels and Albertine continues to escalate ("The Letters"), but a broken Marcel halts it by scribbling out a telegram begging her to return on any terms. Before he can send it, a messenger appears with news of her death.

One more letter from Albertine arrives in the morning mail. Marcel opens it and reads as the Narrator goes to the piano and takes out the "real" letter. It is aged, creased and stained ("Albertine's Last Letter"). Curtain.

With his story finished, the Narrator adds that there is one song that did not fit anywhere into his story, so he has put it here. He summons back Albertine to perform a simple, pure, straightforward love song ("If It Is True") — everything that Marcel and the Narrator have been seeking and never found. The End.

== Musical numbers ==
Source: CurtainUp

- Is It Too Late? – Albertine
- Balbec-by-the-Sea – Marcel, Narrator and Ensemble
- Lullaby – Grandmother
- Ferret Song – Albertine, Andrée, Rosemonde and Marcel
- My Soul Weeps – Albertine
- Talk About the Weather – Marcel
- The Different Albertines – Narrator
- Sad Balbec – Narrator and Marcel
- My Soul Weeps (Tango) – Rosemonde and Ensemble
- But What I Say – Narrator, Marcel and Albertine
- Song of Solitude – Narrator
- I Want You – Mademoiselle Lea
- I Need Me a Girl – Albertine and Ensemble
- But What I Say (Reprise) – Narrator, Marcel and Albertine
- Sometimes – Mademoiselle Lea, Rosemonde and Andrée
- The Street – Marcel and Ensemble
- The Letters – Albertine, Marcel, Narrator and Company
- Albertine's Last Letter – Narrator
- If It Is True – Albertine

== Recording ==
PS Classics released the cast album in October 2003. Steven Suskin called the score "evocative and often moving".
