= This World of Tomorrow =

2025 play

- World Premiere Production Poster
- Written by: Tom Hanks; James Glossman
- Based on: A series of short stories written by Hanks

Premiere
- Date: October 30, 2025
- Place: The Shed, New York City
- Directed by: Kenny Leon

This World of Tomorrow is a play written by Tom Hanks and James Glossman, based on a series of short stories written by Hanks. It had its world premiere Off-Broadway at The Shed in New York City on October 30, 2025. The production is directed by Kenny Leon.

== Synopsis ==
A forlorn scientist from the future embarks on a time-traveling quest for true love as he repeatedly returns to one particular day at the 1939 World's Fair.

== Production history ==
=== Off-Broadway (2025) ===
The play received its world premiere Off-Broadway at The Shed in New York City. Previews began on October 30, 2025, with an opening night on November 18 and closed on December 21. Casting included Tom Hanks as Bert Allenberry and Kelli O'Hara as Carmen.

== Cast and characters ==
Character	Off-Broadway
Character	2025
Bert Allenberry	Tom Hanks
Carmen	Kelli O'Hara
M-Dash	Ruben Santiago-Hudson
Cyndee/ Woman Cashier	Kerry Bishé
Virginia	Kayli Carter
Lee/Tommy/ Doorman/Sandor	Lee Aaron Rosen
E.L.M.A./Sylvia	Jamie Ann Romero
Honoria/ Late-Night Cabbie	Michelle Wilson
Dr. Tanner/ Howard/Nico	Paul Murphy
Max/Costas/ Booming Voice	Jay O. Sanders
Baumgarten/Percy/ Clarence/Bud/ Sweeper/Alvin/Assan	Donald Webber Jr.
