= Mrs Dalloway =

1925 novel by Virginia Woolf

- First edition dust jacket, 1925; cover art by Vanessa Bell
- Author: Virginia Woolf
- Language: English
- Publisher: Hogarth Press
- Publication date: 14 May 1925
- Publication place: United Kingdom
- Media type: Print (hardback & paperback)
- Pages: 224 (paperback)
- ISBN: 0-15-662870-8
- OCLC: 20932825
- Dewey Decimal: 823.912 20
- LC Class: PR6045.O72 M7 1990b
- Text: Mrs Dalloway at Wikisource

Mrs Dalloway is a novel by Virginia Woolf published on 14 May 1925. It details a day in the life of Clarissa Dalloway, a wealthy woman in post-First World War London.

The working title of Mrs Dalloway was The Hours. The novel originated from two short stories, "Mrs Dalloway in Bond Street" and the unfinished "The Prime Minister". In autumn 1922, Woolf began to think of the "Mrs Dalloway" short story as the first chapter of her new novel, and she completed the manuscript in late autumn 1924.

The book describes Clarissa's preparations for a party she will host in the evening and the ensuing party. With an interior perspective, the story travels forwards and backwards in time to construct an image of Clarissa's life and the inter-war social structure. The novel addresses the nature of time in personal experience through multiple interwoven stories, using a stream of consciousness narration style.

In October 2005, Mrs Dalloway was included on Time magazine's list of the 100 best English-language novels written since its first issue in 1923.

== Plot summary ==
Clarissa Dalloway goes around London in the morning, getting ready to host a party that evening. The nice day reminds her of her youth spent in the countryside in Bourton and makes her wonder about her choice of husband; she had married the reliable, successful Richard Dalloway instead of the enigmatic and demanding Peter Walsh. She "had not the option" to be with a female romantic interest, Sally Seton. Peter reintroduces these conflicts by paying a visit that morning. Peter's visit makes it clear that he is still in love with Clarissa (despite mention of his new love interest, Daisy), and Clarissa expresses her desire for Peter to take her away. Clarissa additionally invites Peter to her party that evening.

Septimus Warren Smith, a First World War veteran suffering from deferred traumatic stress, spends his day in the park with his Italian-born wife Lucrezia, who experiences major loneliness as a result of her husband's isolating illness. His going to war affected not only his ability to function, but Lucrezia's as well. Septimus is now visited by frequent and indecipherable hallucinations, mostly concerning his dear friend Evans, whom he had unresolved unrequited sexual feelings towards, and who died in the war; otherwise Septimus seems to be unable to feel emotions for anyone, even his wife. Septimus's relationship with his physicians, Sir William Bradshaw and Dr Holmes, is extremely poor. He fears for his safety in the presence of both doctors and often questions human nature after their interactions. As a result of his involuntary commitment to a psychiatric hospital he takes his own life by jumping out of a window.

Clarissa's party in the evening is a slow success. It is attended by most of the characters she has met throughout the book, including Sally, Peter, and others from her past. Clarissa discovers that Sally, whom she has not seen for several decades, and who used to be a free-spirited tomboy, has become a respectable, matronly mother to five boys.

The novel ends with Clarissa hearing about Septimus's suicide at the party and gradually coming to admire this stranger's act, which she considers an effort to preserve the purity of his happiness. Clarissa also acknowledges her ability to relate to Septimus regardless of her limited knowledge of him.

== Characters ==
Clarissa Dalloway
The 51-year-old protagonist of the novel. She is Richard's wife and Elizabeth's mother, and, while reminiscing about her past, spends the day organising a party that will be held that night. She is self-conscious about her role in London's high society. The character was based on Kitty Lushington.
Elizabeth Dalloway
Clarissa and Richard's 17-year-old daughter. She is said to look "oriental" and has great composure. Compared to her mother, she takes great pleasure in politics and modern history, hoping to be either a doctor or farmer in the future. She would rather spend time in the country with her father than attend her mother's party.
Richard Dalloway
Clarissa's practical, "simple" husband, who feels disconnected from his wife. He is immersed in his work in government.
Miss Kilman
Miss Doris Kilman, originally "Kiehlman", is Elizabeth's schoolmistress for history and is a born-again Christian. She has a degree in history and during the Great War was dismissed from her teaching job because "Miss Dolby thought she would be happier with people who shared her views about the Germans". She has a German ancestry and wears an unattractive mackintosh coat because she is uninterested in dressing to please others. She dislikes Clarissa intensely but loves to spend time with Elizabeth.
Sally Seton
A love interest of Clarissa's, with whom she shared a kiss, who is now married to Lord Rosseter and has five boys. Sally had a strained relationship with her family and spent substantial time with Clarissa's family in her youth. She once could be described as feisty, as well as a youthful ragamuffin, although she has become more conventional with age.
Lucrezia "Rezia" Warren Smith
Septimus' Italian wife. She is burdened by his mental illness and believes she is judged because of it. During most of the novel, she is homesick for her family and country, which she left to marry Septimus after the Armistice.
Septimus Warren Smith
A World War I veteran who suffers from "shell shock" and hallucinations of his deceased friend, Evans. Educated and decorated in the war, he is detached from society and believes himself to be unable to feel. He is married to Lucrezia, from whom he has grown distant.
Peter Walsh
An old friend of Clarissa's who has failed at most of his ventures in life. In the past, Clarissa rejected his marriage proposal. Now he has returned to England from India and is one of Clarissa's party guests. He plans to marry Daisy, a married woman in India, and has returned to try to arrange a divorce from his current wife.
Hugh Whitbread
A pompous friend of Clarissa's, who holds an unspecified position in the British Royal household. Like Clarissa, he places great importance on his place in society. Although he believes he is an essential member of the British aristocracy, Lady Bruton, Clarissa, Richard, and Peter find him obnoxious.
Sir William Bradshaw
A famous psychiatrist to whom Septimus' physician, Dr. Holmes, refers Septimus. Bradshaw notes that Septimus has had a complete nervous breakdown and suggests spending time in the country as a cure.

== Style ==
In Mrs Dalloway, all of the action, aside from the flashbacks, takes place on a day in "the middle of June" of 1923. It is an example of stream of consciousness storytelling: every scene closely tracks the momentary thoughts of a particular character. Woolf blurs the distinction between direct and indirect speech throughout the novel, freely alternating her mode of narration between omniscient description, indirect interior monologue, and soliloquy. The narration follows at least twenty characters in this way, but the bulk of the novel is spent with Clarissa Dalloway, Peter Walsh, and Septimus Smith.

Woolf laid out some of her literary goals with the characters of Mrs Dalloway while still working on the novel. A year before its publication, she gave a talk at Cambridge University called "Character in Fiction", revised and retitled later that year as "Mr. Bennett and Mrs. Brown".

Mrs Dalloway is commonly thought to be a response to James Joyce's Ulysses. Both novels use the stream of consciousness technique to follow the thoughts of two characters, one older and one younger, during one day in a bustling city. Woolf herself, writing in 1928, denied any deliberate "method" to the book, saying instead that the structure came about "without any conscious direction".

== Themes ==
The novel has two main narrative lines involving two separate characters (Clarissa Dalloway and Septimus Smith); within each narrative there is a particular time and place in the past that the main characters keep returning to in their minds. For Clarissa, her charmed youth at Bourton keeps intruding into her thoughts on this day in London. For Septimus, his time as a soldier during the "Great War" keeps intruding, especially in the form of Evans, his fallen comrade. Other characters, such as Peter Walsh, also find themselves returning to moments in their past.

=== Time and secular living ===
Time plays an integral role in the theme of faith and doubt in Mrs Dalloway. The overwhelming presence of the passing of time and the impending fate of death for each of the characters is felt throughout the novel. As Big Ben towers over the city of London and rings for each half-hour, characters cannot help but stop and notice the loss of life to time in regular intervals throughout the story. For Septimus, who has experienced the vicious war, the notion of death constantly floats in his mind as he continues to see his friend Evans talking of such things. The constant stream of consciousness perspective of the characters, especially Clarissa, serves as a distraction from this passing of time and the ultimate march towards death, but each character is constantly reminded of the inevitability of these facts. Further emphasizing the passage of time is the time-frame of the novel, which takes place in the course of a single day, like Joyce's Ulysses.

The idea that there can be meaning in every detail of life, and a deeper appreciation of life as a result, is emphasized by the constant connection of characters to memories and to simple ideas and things. Clarissa even feels that her job (throwing her parties) is to offer "the gift" of connectedness to the inhabitants of London. Woolf's writing style crosses the boundaries of the past, present and future, emphasizing her idea of time as a constant flow, connected only by some force (or divinity) within each person. An evident contrast can be found between the constant passing of time—symbolized by Big Ben—and the seemingly random crossings of time-lines in Woolf's writing. Yet, although these crossings seem random, they only demonstrate the infinite possibilities that the world can offer once it is interconnected by the individual character of each person.

=== Mental illness ===
Septimus, as the shell-shocked war hero, operates as a pointed criticism of the treatment of mental illness and depression. Woolf criticises medical discourse through Septimus' decline and suicide; his doctors make snap judgments about his condition, talk to him mainly through his wife, and dismiss his urgent confessions before he can make them. Rezia remarks that Septimus "was not ill. Dr Holmes said there was nothing the matter with him."

Woolf goes beyond commenting on the treatment of mental illness. Using the characters of Clarissa and Rezia, she makes the argument that people can only interpret Septimus' shell shock according to their cultural norms. Throughout the course of the novel Clarissa does not meet Septimus. Clarissa's reality is vastly different from that of Septimus; his presence in London is unknown to Clarissa until his death becomes the subject of idle chatter at her party. By never having these characters meet, Woolf is suggesting that mental illness can be contained to the individuals who suffer from it without others, who remain unaffected, ever having to witness it. This allows Woolf to weave her criticism of the treatment of the mentally ill with her larger argument, which is the criticism of society's class structure. Her use of Septimus as the stereotypically traumatised veteran is her way of showing that there were still reminders of the First World War in London in 1923. These ripples affect Mrs. Dalloway and readers spanning generations. Shell shock, or post traumatic stress disorder, is an important addition to the early 20th century canon of post-war British literature.

There are similarities in Septimus' condition to Woolf's struggles with bipolar disorder. Both hallucinate that birds sing in Greek, and Woolf once attempted to throw herself out of a window as Septimus does. Woolf had also been treated for her condition at various asylums, from which her antipathy towards doctors developed. Woolf committed suicide by drowning, sixteen years after the publication of Mrs Dalloway.

Woolf's original plan for her novel called for Clarissa to kill herself during her party. In this original version, Septimus (whom Woolf called Mrs. Dalloway's "double") did not appear at all.

=== Existential issues ===
When Peter Walsh sees a girl on the street and stalks her for half an hour, he notes that his relationship to the girl was "made up, as one makes up the better part of life." By focusing on characters' thoughts and perceptions, Woolf emphasizes the significance of private thoughts on existential crisis rather than concrete events in a person's life. Most of the plot in Mrs Dalloway consists of realizations that the characters subjectively make.

Clarissa Dalloway is depicted as a woman who appreciates life. Her love of party-throwing comes from a desire to bring people together and create happy moments. Her charm, according to Peter Walsh, who loves her, is a sense of joie de vivre, always summarized by the sentence: "There she was." She interprets Septimus Smith's death as an act of embracing life and her mood remains light, even though she hears about it in the midst of the party.

=== Feminism ===
As a commentary on inter-war society, Clarissa's character highlights the role of women as the proverbial "Angel in the House" and embodies sexual and economic repression and the narcissism of bourgeois women who have never known the hunger and insecurity of working women. She keeps up with and even embraces the social expectations of the wife of a patrician politician, but she is still able to express herself and find distinction in the parties she throws.

Her old friend Sally Seton, whom Clarissa admires dearly, is remembered as a great independent woman – she smoked cigars, once ran down a corridor naked to fetch her sponge-bag, and made bold, unladylike statements to get a reaction from people. When Clarissa meets her in the present day, Sally turns out to be a perfect housewife, having accepted her lot as a rich woman ("Yes, I have ten thousand a year"-whether before the tax was paid, or after, she couldn't remember...), married, and given birth to five sons.

=== Homosexuality ===
Clarissa Dalloway felt a strong bond to Sally Seton at Bourton, and those feelings seem to extend beyond friendship. Thirty-four years later, Clarissa still considers the kiss they shared to be the "most exquisite" moment of her life, and she remembers feeling about Sally "as men feel." Clarissa even goes so far as to compare her feelings to those that Shakespeare's character Othello feels for Desdemona—and when she looks back and ponders those emotions, the narration remarks, "But this question of love (she thought, putting her coat away), this falling in love with women. Take Sally Seton; her relation in the old days with Sally Seton. Had not that, after all, been love?" Clarissa then recalls Sally's visit and how others seemed "indifferent" to Sally's presence, and she thinks to herself, "But nothing is so strange when one is in love (and what was this except being in love?) as the complete indifference of other people."

Clarissa also recalls Sally's visit—specifically the experience of seeing Sally at dinner—as "the most happy" moment of her life. Nevertheless, scholar Kate Haffey observes that some critics have attempted to gloss over the narrative's erotic qualities and reframe Clarissa and Sally's early relationship as a fanciful yet ultimately platonic phase of heterosexual female development: "Despite the quite sexual nature of Clarissa's descriptions of her affections for women, her feelings for Sally are most often constructed as representing a period of girlhood innocence that is sharply contrasted with the adult self […] When this love is not described in terms of its 'innocence,' it is positioned as part of that 'unruly' phase of adolescence, a period incompatible with female maturity." Yet in the novel itself, memories of the kiss are rendered in passionate language (Clarissa compares the kiss to "a diamond, something infinitely precious"), and this moment of the past drifts back powerfully into Clarissa's present, creating a sense of timelessness. The kiss thus underlines the novel's theme of temporality, as the experience is a moment that seems to stand outside or suspend ordinary time.

Similarly, Septimus is haunted by the image of his dear friend and commanding officer, Evans, who is described as being "undemonstrative in the company of women." The narrator describes Septimus and Evans behaving together like "two dogs playing on a hearth-rug" who, inseparable, "had to be together, share with each other, fight with each other, quarrel with each other...." Jean E. Kennard notes that the word "share" could easily be read in a Forsteran manner, perhaps as in Forster's Maurice; "The word 'share' […] was often used in this period to describe sexual relations between men." Kennard also notes Septimus' "increasing revulsion at the idea of heterosexual sex," abstaining from sex with Rezia and feeling that "the business of copulation was filth to him before the end."

== Adaptations ==
Dutch film director Marleen Gorris made a film version of Mrs Dalloway in 1997. It was adapted from Woolf's novel by British actress Eileen Atkins and starred Vanessa Redgrave and Natascha McElhone in the title role. The cast included Lena Headey, Rupert Graves, Michael Kitchen, Alan Cox, Sarah Badel, and Katie Carr.

A related 2002 film, The Hours depicts a single day in the lives of three women across generations affected by Mrs Dalloway: Woolf writing it in 1923, a Los Angeles housewife reading it in 1951, and a New York literary editor living it in 2001. Adapted from the 1998 novel by Michael Cunningham, the cast features Nicole Kidman as Woolf, Julianne Moore as housewife Laura, and Meryl Streep as editor Clarissa. Cunningham titled his novel The Hours after Woolf's working title for Mrs Dalloway. A 2022 opera with music by Kevin Puts and libretto by Greg Pierce was based on Cunningham's novel and the film.

In 2025, to mark the 100th anniversary of the novel's publication, it was broadcast on BBC Radio Four, in ten 15-minute instalments, read by Siân Thomas.

Twin Nigerian film directors Arie and Chuko Esiri co-directed Clarissa, starring Sophie Okonedo, David Oyelowo, Ayo Edebiri, Nikki Amuka-Bird, India Amarteifio and Toheeb Jimoh. The film is a modern-day reimagining of the novel, set in Lagos. It was announced that the film was acquired by Neon for worldwide distribution rights and will have its world premiere at the Directors' Fortnight section of the 2026 Cannes Film Festival.

== Other appearances ==
Mrs Dalloway also appears in Virginia Woolf's first novel, The Voyage Out, as well as five of her short stories, in which the character hosts dinner parties to which the main subject of the narrative is invited:

- "The New Dress": a self-conscious guest has a new dress made for the event
- "The Introduction": whose main character is Lily Everit
- "Together and Apart": Mrs Dalloway introduces the main protagonists
- "The Man Who Loved His Kind": Mrs Dalloway's husband, Richard, invites a school friend, who finds the evening uncomfortable in the extreme
- "A Summing Up": a couple meet in her garden

The stories (except for "The Introduction") all appear in the 1944 collection A Haunted House and Other Short Stories, and in the 1973 collection Mrs Dalloway's Party.
