= Fallen Angels (play) =

1925 play by Noël Coward

Edna Best, Austin Trevor and Tallulah Bankhead in the original London production, 1925

Fallen Angels is a comedy by the English playwright Noël Coward. It opened at the Globe Theatre (now called the Gielgud Theatre), London, on 21 April 1925 and ran until 29 August. Its depiction of two married women admitting to premarital sex and contemplating adultery met with hostility from the theatre censor, the office of the Lord Chamberlain, and the necessary licence was granted only after the personal intervention of the Chamberlain.

== Background ==
In 1924 Coward achieved his first hit as a playwright with The Vortex, and he consolidated his success in March 1925 with the revue On with the Dance. His script for the comedy Fallen Angels had already attracted the interest of Gladys Cooper, who wanted to produce the piece and co-star with Madge Titheradge, but the contractual commitments of the two actresses precluded it. Only after the success of The Vortex did other managements become eager to stage Coward's other works, which, along with Fallen Angels, included Hay Fever and Easy Virtue.

Fallen Angels was taken up by Marie Lohr and her husband Anthony Prinsep, who were jointly in management at the Globe Theatre in Shaftesbury Avenue. They intended it as a vehicle for Margaret Bannerman, a popular West End star. (Note: Bannerman later became Prinsip's second wife, after his divorce from Lohr.) There was initially some difficulty in obtaining a licence from the theatre censor, the Lord Chamberlain, whose approval was required for any public theatrical presentation. (Note: This requirement remained in force in Britain until 1968, when the Theatres Act abolished theatre censorship.) An official in the Lord Chamberlain's office recommended that a licence should be refused on the grounds that the loose morals of the two main female characters "would cause too great a scandal". The Lord Chamberlain, Lord Cromer, overruled his subordinate: "I take the view that the whole thing is so much unreal farcical comedy, that subject to a few modifications in the dialogue it can pass."

Four days before the premiere Bannerman was taken ill, and Tallulah Bankhead was brought in as a last-minute substitute. The play, directed by Stanley Bell, opened at the Globe on 21 April 1925 and ran for 158 performances, until 29 August.

== Original cast ==
Julia Sterroll – Tallulah Bankhead
Frederick Sterroll – Arthur Wellesley
Jane Banbury – Edna Best
William Banbury – Gerald Ames
Saunders – Mona Harrison
Maurice Duclos – Austin Trevor

Source: The Times, 22 April 1925.

== Synopsis ==
The play is set in the London flat of Frederick and Julia Sterroll in 1925.

Act 1

Two youngish men, Frederick Sterroll and William Banbury, go off on a golfing trip, leaving their wives to amuse themselves as best they can. The wives have each received a postcard from Maurice Duclos, whose lovers they both had been before their marriages. He tells them he is due in London and hopes to call on them imminently. Unsure whether they will be able to resist Maurice's powerful charm, they decide to leave before he arrives, but as they are about to go, suitcases in hand, the doorbell rings.

Act 2

The ring at the door had not been Maurice (it was the plumber), and the two women have decided to brave the forthcoming encounter. While waiting, quite nervously, for Maurice's arrival, they drink too many cocktails and too much champagne. Their old rivalry for Maurice's affections surfaces, they begin to bicker, and a tremendous quarrel ensues. By the end of the act Maurice has still not appeared and Julia has ordered Jane out of the flat.

Act 3

The next morning Julia wrongly imagines Jane has gone off with Maurice. In fury Julia tells William about his wife's supposed liaison. Jane, meanwhile, having spent the night innocently alone at a hotel, concludes that Julia and Maurice have gone off together, and she tells Frederick about her suspicions. Maurice finally arrives, and (almost) reassures the husbands that nobody has gone off with anybody, and there is nothing to worry about. He has taken the flat above the Sterrolls, and invites both couples to come and see it. The men decline, and Maurice escorts Julia and Jane to his flat. Presently the voices of all three are heard singing a sentimental love song; the husbands exchange panicked glances and rush upstairs.

== Later productions ==
A production by the Amsterdam Municipal Theatre was banned after a few performances in 1926. The play was presented on Broadway in 1927 and ran for 36 performances, with the following cast:

Julia Sterroll – Fay Bainter
Frederick Sterroll – Gordon Ash
Jane Banbury – Estelle Winwood
William Banbury – Gerald Hamer
Saunders – Eileen Beldon
Maurice Duclos – Luis Alberni

Under the title Le Printemps de Saint-Martin, the play was given in Paris in 1928 and again in 1945. Fallen Angels was revived in 1949 in a production seen first at the Shakespeare Memorial Theatre and then the Ambassadors Theatre, London. Hermione Gingold and Hermione Baddeley played the wives. Coward revised the play in 1953. In a Broadway production in 1956, with the script revised by Coward to set the action in New York, Nancy Walker and Margaret Phillips played Julia and Jane. A 1967 West End revival starred Joan Greenwood and Constance Cummings. A New York revival in 1980 featured Jo Henderson and Carol Teitel. In 2000 Felicity Kendal and Frances de la Tour played the wives in a production at the Apollo Theatre, London.

A television adaption of the play was broadcast by the BBC in 1963, with Ann Morrish and Moira Redmond as Julia and Jane. BBC radio presented a production in April 1973, a month after the author's death. Julia was played by Mary Wimbush and Jane by Isabel Dean. The following year, an Anglia television adaptation starred Susannah York as Julia and Joan Collins as Jane.

The Menier Chocolate Factory in London produced the play in November 2025.

A new production of the play by Roundabout Theatre Company began previews in March 2026 and officially opened on April 19 at the Todd Haimes Theatre on Broadway, starring Rose Byrne and Kelli O'Hara and directed by Scott Ellis.

== Reception ==
Critical opinion of the original production was divided, with the down-market press taking a hostile, moralistic stance, and the critics in the more serious newspapers taking a generally favourable view. The Daily Express called the piece an "unpleasant play which might tickle the palate of certain playgoers who enjoy the decadent". The Daily Mirror found the leading characters and their "'modern' impudences" "very tiresome". The Manchester Guardian praised Coward's theatrical skill as "little short of amazing". and the reviewer in The Observer, though rating the piece "neither a great nor a good play" on account of its overt theatricality and lack of depth, declared himself "vastly amuse[d]" by it. The Times judged that the play confirmed Coward's position as "the most uncannily adroit of our younger dramatists". In The Saturday Review Ivor Brown wrote:

Fallen Angels has created a bit of a fuss and it is easy to see the reason. Mr Coward has employed the French farcical idiom for the English "legitimate" stage. If the second act of this piece, which shows two English wives waiting for their mutual lover and getting mildly drunk while he dallies, had been condensed into a ten-minutes sketch for a revue, little more would have been heard about it. If Fallen Angels had been written by Sacha Guitry and brought over here as part of the family luggage, it would have been acclaimed as witty, airy, deliciously Gallic and all the rest of it. If its plain-speaking had been wiped out, its central situation had been softened, and its hard, crisp dialogue had been reduced to the language of leers and winks, it would have been acclaimed as a jolly English farce. But since it is an English essay in the French mode a cry of shocked surprise has gone up.

At the time of the Paris production in 1945 the reviewer in the newspaper Ce Soir praised Coward's comedy as comparable with Molière's Le Médecin volant, but some later productions attracted less favourable notices. The West End revivals in 1949 and 1967 prompted comments that the material was too thin for a three-act piece. By the time of the 2000 West End revival, critical opinion had shifted in Coward's favour. Variety found the play "deliciously featherweight", and The Observer called it "a fine piece of Coward writing: witty, trenchant, superficially frothy but actually questioning the empty lives led by these indolent privileged people".

In a 2000 study of Coward's works, Peter Raby groups Fallen Angels with some of the playwright's other early works in which Coward was more open than his predecessors Wilde and Saki about the prominence of sex in theatrical romances: "[W]hether the treatment is serious – as in The Vortex and Easy Virtue – or comic – as in Hay Fever and Fallen Angels – the overall impact seems much the same: sex is disruptive, compelling, even overwhelming, while sex and marriage are difficult, perhaps impossible, to reconcile."

== Awards and nominations ==
=== 2026 Broadway revival ===
Year	Award	Category	Nominee	Result	Ref.
2026	Drama League Awards	Outstanding Revival of a Play		Nominated	
2026	Drama League Awards	Distinguished Performance	Rose Byrne	Nominated	
2026	Drama League Awards	Distinguished Performance	Kelli O'Hara	Nominated	
2026	Tony Awards	Best Revival of a Play		Nominated	
2026	Tony Awards	Best Actress in a Play	Rose Byrne	Nominated	
2026	Tony Awards	Best Actress in a Play	Kelli O'Hara	Nominated	
2026	Tony Awards	Best Scenic Design in a Play	David Rockwell	Nominated	
2026	Tony Awards	Best Costume Design in a Play	Jeff Mahshie	Won	
2026	Outer Critics Circle Award	Outstanding Lead Performer in a Broadway Play	Kelli O'Hara	Nominated	
2026	Outer Critics Circle Award	Outstanding Lead Performer in a Broadway Play	Rose Byrne	Nominated	
2026	Outer Critics Circle Award	Outstanding Costume Design	Jeff Mahshie	Nominated	
2026	Dorian Award	Outstanding Broadway Play Revival		Nominated	
2026	Dorian Award	Outstanding Lead Performance in a Broadway Play	Rose Byrne	Nominated	
2026	Dorian Award	Outstanding Lead Performance in a Broadway Play	Kelli O'Hara	Nominated	
