= Kelli O'Hara =

American actress and singer (born 1976)

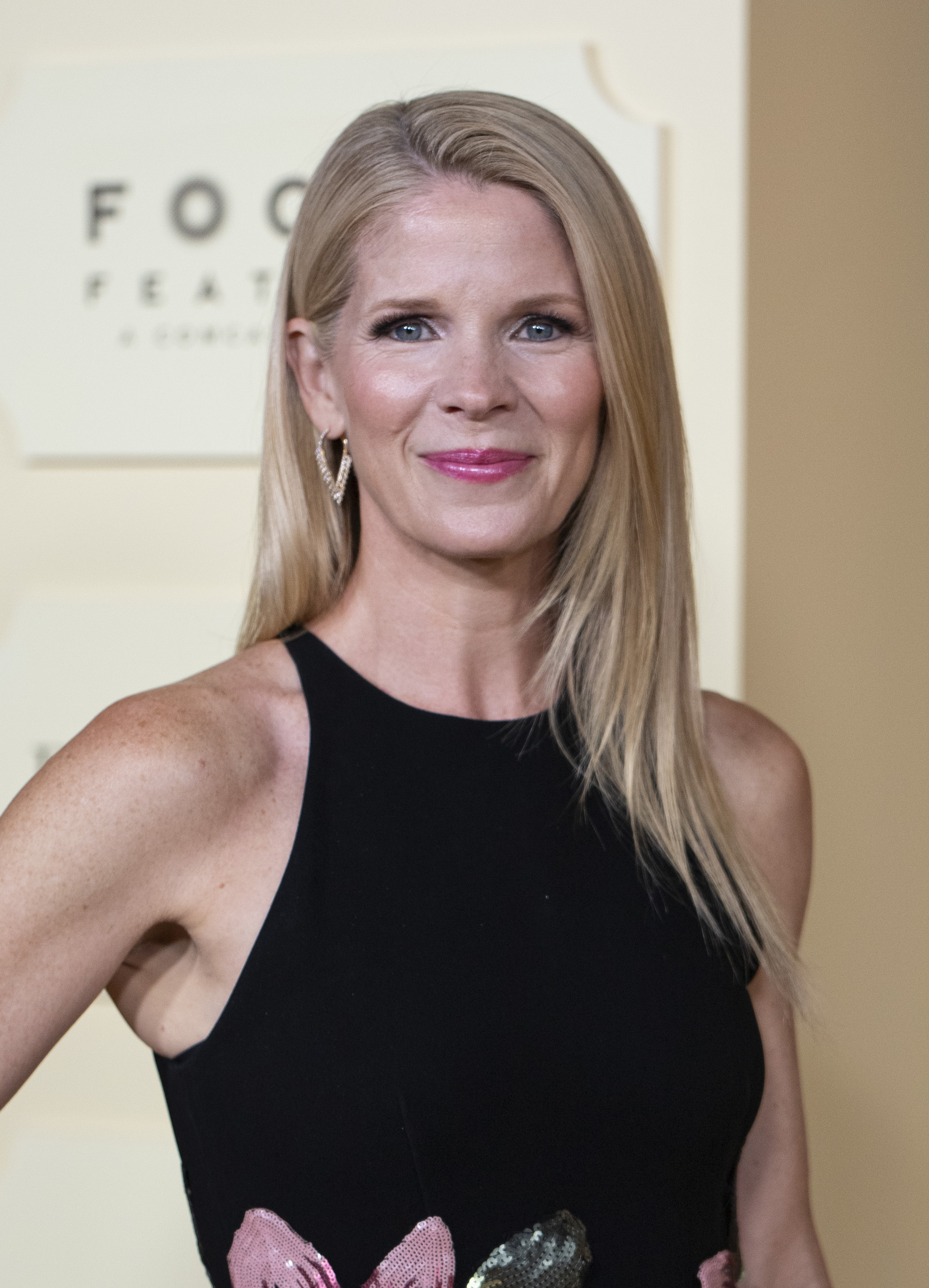
- O'Hara in 2025
- Born: April 16, 1976 (age 50); Tulsa, Oklahoma, U.S.
- Education: Oklahoma City University (BM)
- Occupations: Actress; singer
- Years active: 1999–present
- Spouse: Greg Naughton (m. 2007)
- Children: 2
- Relatives: James Naughton, father-in-law David Naughton, uncle in-law
- Website: www.kelliohara.com

Kelli Christine O'Hara (born April 16, 1976) is an American actress and singer, most known for her work on in Broadway musicals as well as in some opera productions. She has received a Tony Award, a Drama Desk Award, and a Drama League Award as well as nominations for three Grammy Awards, a Primetime Emmy Award, a Screen Actors Guild Award, and a Laurence Olivier Award.

O'Hara portrayed Anna Leonowens in the revival of The King and I for which she won the Tony Award for Best Actress in a Musical in 2015. She reprised her role in the West End for which she was nominated for the Laurence Olivier Award for Best Actress in a Musical in 2019. She was Tony-nominated for her performances in The Light in the Piazza (2005), The Pajama Game (2006), South Pacific (2008), Nice Work If You Can Get It (2012), The Bridges of Madison County (2014), Kiss Me, Kate (2019), Days of Wine and Roses (2024), and Fallen Angels (2026).

O'Hara made her debut at The Metropolitan Opera in a 2014 production of Franz Lehár's The Merry Widow. In 2018, she played the role of Despina in the Met Opera's production of Mozart's Così fan tutte. In 2022, she returned to the Met, starring as Laura Brown in Kevin Puts' The Hours, a role she and co-stars Renée Fleming and Joyce DiDonato reprised for eight performances in May 2024.

She has also played roles in television series, such as Masters of Sex, 13 Reasons Why, and The Gilded Age, receiving a nomination for the Primetime Emmy Award for Outstanding Actress in a Short Form Comedy or Drama Series for her starring role in the 2017 web drama series The Accidental Wolf at the 70th Primetime Creative Arts Emmy Awards in 2018.

== Early life and education ==
Kelli O'Hara was born in Tulsa, Oklahoma, and grew up in Elk City, Oklahoma in an Irish American family. She graduated from Deer Creek High School and also attended Oklahoma City University, graduating with a bachelor's degree in music in vocal performance/opera. O'Hara studied voice with Florence Birdwell, who also taught Kristin Chenoweth four years earlier. O'Hara and Chenoweth are both alumnae of the Gamma Phi Beta sorority.

== Career ==
=== 2000–2009: Early roles and breakthrough ===
One of O'Hara's earliest professional roles was in a U.S. national tour of the musical Jekyll & Hyde. She went on to play the role of Young Hattie Walker in the 2001 Broadway revival of Follies, and then played the role of Young Phyllis Rogers Stone. She next appeared in the 2002 Broadway production of Sweet Smell of Success as Susan Hunsecker. In 2003 she played Albertine in the Off-Broadway Playwrights Horizons production of the musical My Life with Albertine, and, in 2004, Lucy Westenra in the Broadway production of Dracula, the Musical.

She starred as Clara Johnson in the 2005 Broadway production of The Light in the Piazza at Lincoln Center's Vivian Beaumont Theatre. She had appeared in a workshop of the musical at the Theatre Lab at Sundance, and in tryouts in Seattle and Chicago, as the character of Franca Naccarelli. She received a 2005 Tony Award nomination for Best Featured Actress in a Musical at the 59th Tony Awards. O'Hara has been nominated for, or won, a Tony Award for every subsequent role she has played on Broadway. In her next Broadway musical, she played Babe Williams in the 2006 revival of The Pajama Game, for which she was nominated for Best Leading Actress in a Musical at the 60th Tony Awards. For this performance, New York Times reviewer Ben Brantley wrote that O'Hara "rockets past the promising ingénue status she attained with Light in the Piazza".

In 2007, O'Hara played the role of Dot/Marie in the Los Angeles Reprise! concert staging of Sunday in the Park with George and Eliza Doolittle in the New York Philharmonic's semi-staged production of My Fair Lady at Avery Fisher Hall. She was the voice of producer Beth Totenbag on PBS' 2008 animated series Click and Clack's As the Wrench Turns. From 2008 to 2010, O'Hara starred as Nellie Forbush in the Broadway revival of South Pacific at Lincoln Center's Vivian Beaumont Theater, for which she was nominated for her third Tony Award at the 62nd Tony Awards. She took maternity leave in March 2009 and returned to the musical in October 2009.

=== 2010–2019: Established Broadway actress ===
O'Hara played the role of Ella Peterson in the 2010 New York City Center Encores! concert presentation of Bells Are Ringing. She played the role of Ellen in the film Sex and the City 2 (2010), and in 2011 she appeared in "Mercy", the first episode of the second season of the CBS show Blue Bloods. Also in 2011, she played the role of Amalia Balash in a benefit concert of She Loves Me, presented by the Roundabout Theater Company, in honor of the company's 20th anniversary. Scott Ellis directed, and the musical director was Paul Gemignani. She had performed one of the best known songs from the show, "Will He Like Me?", the previous evening at Kennedy Center in honor of Barbara Cook.

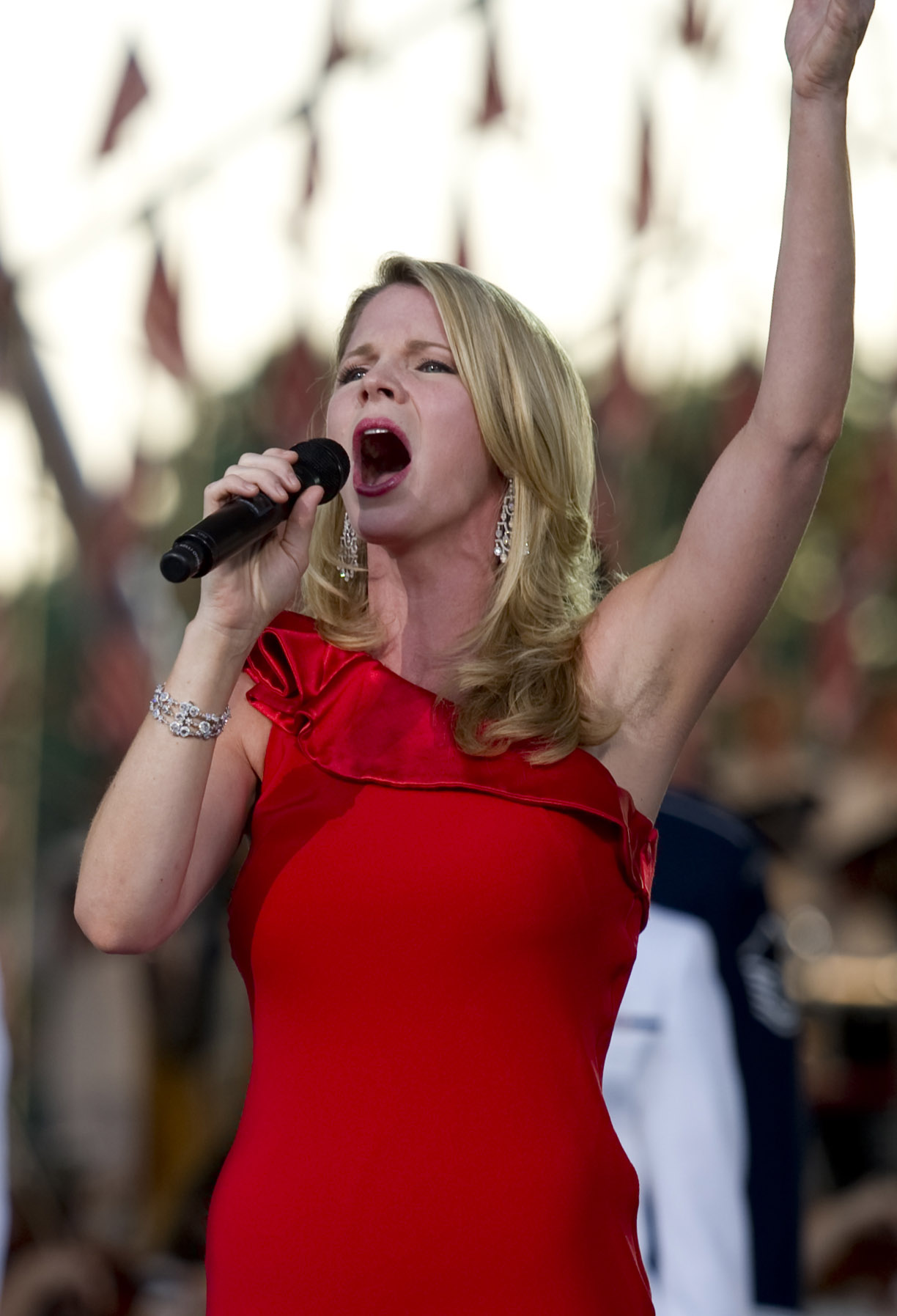
O'Hara performing at the National Memorial Day Concert in 2010

She starred on Broadway as Billie Bendix in Nice Work If You Can Get It from April 2012 to March 2013 and received her fourth Tony Award nomination at the 66th Tony Awards. In 2012, at the New Year's Eve concert, "Celebrating Marvin Hamlisch", at Lincoln Center, she sang "At the Ballet", from A Chorus Line, along with Audra McDonald and Megan Hilty. In 2013, she played the lead character of Julie Jordan in the staged concert of Carousel presented by the New York Philharmonic at Avery Fisher Hall. From January to May 2014, she starred as Francesca Johnson in the Broadway musical The Bridges of Madison County, for which she received her fifth Tony Award nomination at the 68th Tony Awards. Elyse Sommer, a CurtainUp.com reviewer, noted O'Hara's "superb vocal chops" and her "exquisite" duets with co-star Steven Pasquale. She played Mrs. Darling in the 2014 NBC telecast Peter Pan Live!. She sang two concerts, titled "Kelli and Matthew: Home for the Holidays", in December 2014 at Carnegie Hall with Matthew Morrison and the New York Pops. On December 31, 2014, O'Hara made her operatic debut at The Metropolitan Opera as Valencienne Zeta in Franz Lehár's The Merry Widow, alongside Renee Fleming in the title role of Hanna Glawari.

O'Hara returned to Lincoln Center Theatre to star as Anna Leonowens in the Broadway revival of The King and I opposite Ken Watanabe as King Mongkut. The production began previews at the Vivian Beaumont Theatre in March 2015 and opened in April 2015. This role won O'Hara her first Tony Award at the 69th Tony Awards. O'Hara's final performance as Anna was in April 2016. She gave her debut solo concert at Carnegie Hall in October 2016 and guest-starred as the recurring character Dody Oliver on the fourth season of Masters of Sex. She played Fiona MacLaren in the Encores! production of Brigadoon at New York City Center in November 2017. Jeremy Gerard of Deadline Hollywood called O'Hara's performance "luminous", writing: "O’Hara is impossibly beautiful, vocally and in conveying Fiona’s romantic determination and heartbreak." In 2017, she starred as Kate Bonner in the first season of the web drama series The Accidental Wolf, earning a nomination for the Primetime Emmy Award for Outstanding Actress in a Short Form Comedy or Drama Series at the 70th Primetime Creative Arts Emmy Awards. O'Hara appeared in the second season of 13 Reasons Why as Jackie, an anti-bullying advocate. The same year at the Metropolitan Opera, she sang the role of Despina in Così fan tutte. She reprised her role in The King and I at the West End's London Palladium for a limited run from June to September 2018.

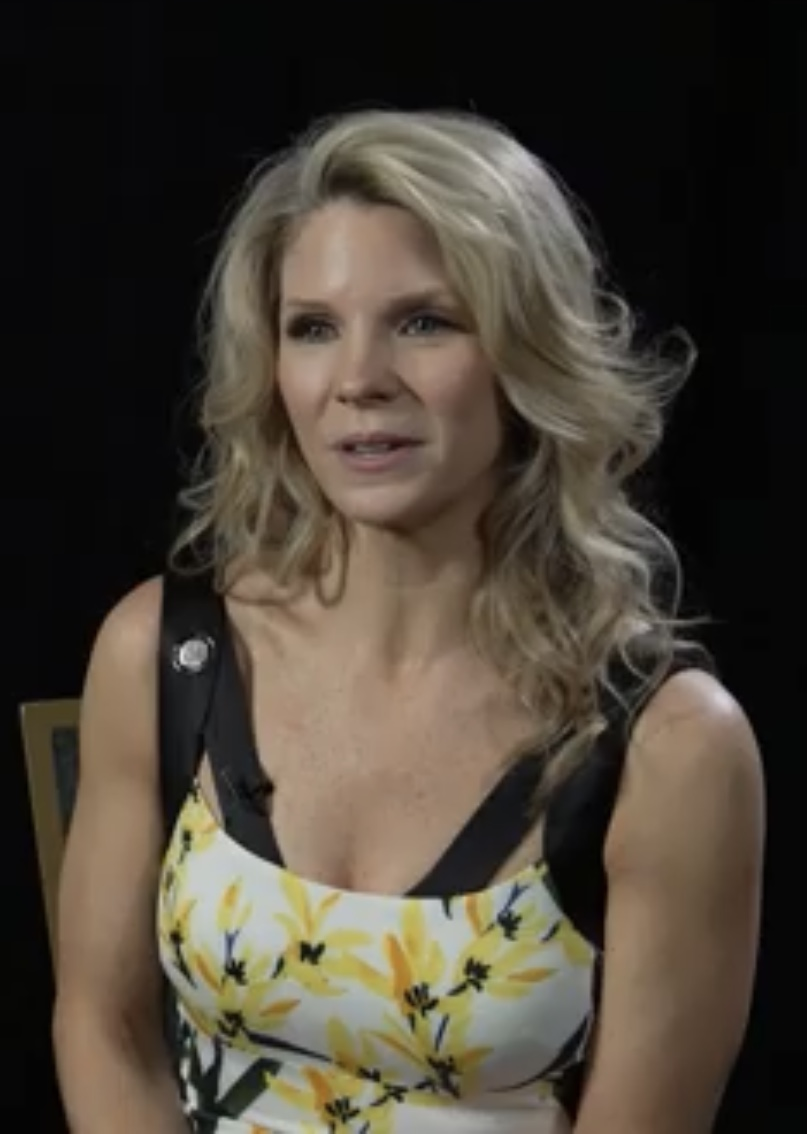
Kelli O'Hara for the 73rd Tony Awards in 2019

She returned to Broadway in February 2019 in a revival of Kiss Me, Kate at Studio 54, as Lilli Vanessi/Katharine Minola. The production was directed by Scott Ellis and choreographed by Warren Carlyle. The revival was produced by the Roundabout Theatre Company, which had produced a benefit concert of the show with O'Hara, Ellis, and Carlyle in 2016. O'Hara received her seventh Tony Award nomination for the revival at the 73rd Tony Awards. In December 2019, she and Richard Thomas joined the Tabernacle Choir at Temple Square for their annual Christmas concert, the 20th annual Christmas concert performed in the 21,000-seat Conference Center. In that concert, she performed “Mary’s Little Boy Child,” the lesser-known “The Birthday of a King,” by W. H. Neidlinger, and the lullaby “A Cradle in Bethlehem” — one of her father’s favorite Christmas songs. She was honored with the Drama League Award for Distinguished Achievement in Musical Theatre in 2019.

=== 2020–present ===
In a 2022 interview with Theatermania, she discussed working on three projects at once: HBO's costume drama The Gilded Age, from Downton Abbey creator Julian Fellowes; a new season of The Accidental Wolf, in a role that earned her a 2018 Emmy nomination, as a woman who becomes embroiled in a scandal after receiving a phone call from a stranger being murdered; and a role as Laura Brown in the operatic adaptation of Michael Cunningham's novel The Hours. She said "I love the fact that you have these things at the same time, because I don't ever want to be put in one box. I couldn't be happier or more challenged to have these three things happening at once."

In May 2023, O'Hara originated the role of Kirsten Arnesen in the musical adaptation of Days of Wine and Roses Off-Broadway at the Linda Gross Theater. In September 2023, it was announced that Days of Wine and Roses would transfer to Broadway's Studio 54 with O'Hara attached. Upon the show's January 2024 opening, a review in New York magazine noted: "O’Hara sings all but four of the play’s songs, and her voice is the kind of instrument that sends people scrabbling for metaphors. It’s a prism, an alpine stream, a Golden Snitch — clear, shimmering and darting, endlessly agile and controlled. She sings like Ginger Rogers dances." The show, originally a limited run set to run until April 28th, closed early on March 31st and garnered O'Hara her eighth Tony nomination at the 77th Tony Awards.

In 2025, she acted opposite Tom Hanks in his romantic science-fiction comedy play This World of Tomorrow where Hanks plays a scientist who travels back to the 1939 New York World's Fair where he meets a woman he falls in love with played by O'Hara. The play premiered at The Shed in 2025 and she will reprise her role alongside Hanks in its Broadway debut in 2027. In 2026, she starred alongside Rose Byrne in the Noël Coward revival Fallen Angels at the Todd Haimes Theatre. The two received critical acclaim for their comedic performances as well as Tony Award for Best Actress in a Play nominations.

== Personal life ==
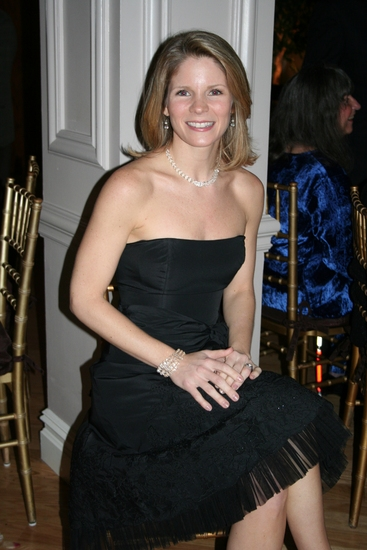
O'Hara at a NYS ARTS Fall Gala in 2008

O'Hara is married to Greg Naughton of The Sweet Remains, son of actor James Naughton and nephew of actor David Naughton. Their first child, Owen James, was born in 2009. Their daughter, Charlotte, was born in 2013.

== Acting credits ==
=== Film ===
Year	Title	Role	Notes
2005	The Dying Gaul	Liz	
2007	The Key to Reserva	Grace Thornberry	Short film
2009	Clear Blue Tuesday	Anonymous Woman	
2010	The Drawn Together Movie: The Movie!	Singer	
2010	Sex and the City 2	Ellen	
2018	The Independents	Kelly	
2020	All the Bright Places	Sheryl Markey	

=== Television ===
Year	Title	Role	Notes
2001	Jekyll & Hyde: Direct from Broadway	Kate	Television film
2007	All My Children	Leslie	2 episodes
2007	Numb3rs	Rachel Lawton	Episode: "Democracy"
2007	American Experience	Maria Reynolds	Episode: "Alexander Hamilton"
2008	Click and Clack's As the Wrench Turns	Beth	2 episodes
2010–2013	Live From Lincoln Center	Julie Jordan/Ensign Nellie Forbush	2 episodes
2011–2021	Blue Bloods	Lisa Farragaut	2 episodes
2014	Peter Pan Live!	Mrs. Darling	Television film
2014	Submissions Only	Anna Grace	Episode: "Having Foresight"
2015–2018	Great Performances at the Met	Despina/Valancienne Zeta	2 episodes
2016	Masters of Sex	Dody	3 episodes
2017	The Good Fight	Deirdre Kresteva	Episode: "Stoppable: Requiem for an Airdate"
2018	13 Reasons Why	Jackie	10 episodes
2020–2022	The Accidental Wolf	Katie	10 episodes
2022–present	The Gilded Age	Aurora Fane	Main role (23 episodes)
2025	Sheriff Country	Miranda Fraley	2 episodes
2026	The Beauty	Juliana	1 episode Beautiful Living Rooms

=== Theater ===
Year	Title	Role	Venue	Notes	Ref.
1999	Jekyll & Hyde	Ensemble / Emma Carew (replacement)	National Tour		
2000	Jekyll & Hyde	Kate (replacement) / Emma Carew (understudy)	Plymouth Theater	Broadway	
2001	Follies	Young Hattie Walker/Ensemble	Belasco Theatre	Broadway	
2002	Sweet Smell of Success: The Musical	Susan Hunsecker	Martin Beck Theater	Broadway	
2003	My Life with Albertine	Albertine	Playwrights Horizons	Off-Broadway	
2003	Beauty	Rose	La Jolla Playhouse	Los Angeles	
2004	The Light in the Piazza	Franca Naccarelli	Goodman Theatre	Chicago	
2004	Dracula, the Musical	Lucy Westenra	Belasco Theatre	Broadway	
2004	The Light in the Piazza	Clara Johnson	Vivian Beaumont Theater	Broadway	
2006	The Pajama Game	Babe Williams	American Airlines Theater	Broadway	
2007	Sunday in the Park with George	Dot / Marie	Reprise Theatre Company	Los Angeles	
2007	My Fair Lady	Eliza Doolittle	Avery Fisher Hall	Lincoln Center	
2007	Oklahoma!	Laurey Williams	Civic Center Music Hall	Oklahoma	
2008	South Pacific	Nellie Forbush	Vivian Beaumont Theater	Broadway	
2010	Bells Are Ringing	Ella Peterson	New York City Center	Concert	
2011	King Lear	Regan	The Public Theater	Off-Broadway	
2011	She Loves Me	Amalia Balash	Stephen Sondheim Theatre	Concert	
2012	Nice Work If You Can Get It	Billie Bendix	Imperial Theatre	Broadway	
2012	Far From Heaven	Cathy Whitaker	Williamstown Theatre Festival	Massachusetts	
2013	Carousel	Julie Jordan	Avery Fisher Hall	Lincoln Center	
2013	Far From Heaven	Cathy Whitaker	Playwrights Horizons	Off-Broadway	
2014	The Bridges of Madison County	Francesca Johnson	Gerald Schoenfeld Theatre	Broadway	
2014	The Merry Widow	Valencienne Zeta	Metropolitan Opera	Lincoln Center	
2015	The King and I	Anna Leonowens	Vivian Beaumont Theater	Broadway	
2016	Dido and Aeneas	Dido	New York City Center	Concert	
2017	Brigadoon	Fiona MacLaren	New York City Center	Concert	
2018	Così fan tutte	Despina	Metropolitan Opera	Lincoln Center	
2018	The King and I	Anna Leonowens	London Palladium	London	
2019	Kiss Me, Kate	Lilli Vanessi/Katharine Minola	Studio 54	Broadway	
2019	The King and I	Anna Leonowens	Tokyu Orb Theatre	Japan	
2022	The Hours	Laura Brown	Philadelphia Orchestra	Philadelphia	
2022	The Hours	Laura Brown	Metropolitan Opera	Lincoln Center	
2023	Ragtime	Mother	Minskoff Theatre	Concert	
2023	Days of Wine and Roses	Kirsten Arnesen	Atlantic Theater Company	Off-Broadway	
2023	Gutenberg! The Musical!	Producer (one night only)	James Earl Jones Theatre	Broadway	
2024	Days of Wine and Roses	Kirsten Arnesen	Studio 54	Broadway	
2024	The Hours	Laura Brown	Metropolitan Opera	Lincoln Center	
2024	South Pacific	Nellie Forbush	Vivian Beaumont Theater	Concert	
2025	This World of Tomorrow	Carmen	The Shed	Off-Broadway	
2026	Fallen Angels	Julia Sterroll	Todd Haimes Theatre	Broadway	
2027	This World of Tomorrow	Carmen	Shubert Theater	Broadway	

== Discography ==
Solo albums

- 2008 Wonder in the World
- 2011 Always

Cast recordings

- 2002 Sweet Smell of Success
- 2003 My Life with Albertine
- 2005 The Light in the Piazza
- 2006 Harry on Broadway, Act I (Note: two-disc set: 1. Original Broadway cast recording The Pajama Game; 2. Songs from Thou Shalt Not, Harry Connick, Jr. featuring Kelli O'Hara)
- 2008 South Pacific
- 2012 Nice Work If You Can Get It
- 2014 The Bridges of Madison County
- 2015 The King and I
- 2019 Kiss Me, Kate
- 2020 Christmas Day in the Morning
- 2023 Days of Wine and Roses
- 2024 The Hours

Soundtracks

- 2014 Peter Pan Live!

== Awards and nominations ==
Organizations	Year	Category	Work	Result	Ref.
Dorian Awards	2024	Outstanding Lead Performance in a Broadway Musical	Days of Wine and Roses	Nominated	
Dorian Awards	2026	Outstanding Lead Performance in a Broadway Play	Fallen Angels	Nominated	
Drama Desk Award	2006	Outstanding Actress in a Musical	The Pajama Game	Nominated	
Drama Desk Award	2008	Outstanding Actress in a Musical	South Pacific	Nominated	
Drama Desk Award	2012	Outstanding Actress in a Musical	Nice Work If You Can Get It	Nominated	
Drama Desk Award	2014	Outstanding Actress in a Musical	The Bridges of Madison County	Nominated	
Drama Desk Award	2024	Outstanding Lead Performance in a Musical	Days of Wine and Roses	Won	
Drama League Awards	2012	Distinguished Performance	Nice Work If You Can Get It	Nominated	
Drama League Awards	2014	Distinguished Performance	The Bridges of Madison County	Nominated	
Drama League Awards	2015	Distinguished Performance	The King and I	Nominated	
Drama League Awards	2019	Distinguished Performance	Kiss Me, Kate	Nominated	
Drama League Awards	2019	Distinguished Achievement in Musical Theatre		Honoree	
Drama League Awards	2024	Distinguished Performance	Days of Wine and Roses	Nominated	
Drama League Awards	2026	Distinguished Performance	Fallen Angels	Nominated	
Evening Standard Theatre Award	2018	Best Musical Performance	The King and I	Nominated	
Grammy Award	2012	Best Musical Theater Album	Nice Work If You Can Get It	Nominated	
Grammy Award	2015	Best Musical Theater Album	The King and I	Nominated	
Grammy Award	2025	Best Opera Recording	The Hours	Nominated	
Laurence Olivier Awards	2019	Best Actress in a Musical	The King and I	Nominated	
Outer Critics Circle Awards	2005	Outstanding Featured Actress in a Musical	The Light in the Piazza	Nominated	
Outer Critics Circle Awards	2006	Outstanding Actress in a Musical	The Pajama Game	Nominated	
Outer Critics Circle Awards	2008	Outstanding Actress in a Musical	South Pacific	Nominated	
Outer Critics Circle Awards	2012	Outstanding Actress in a Musical	Nice Work If You Can Get It	Nominated	
Outer Critics Circle Awards	2014	Outstanding Actress in a Musical	The Bridges of Madison County	Nominated	
Outer Critics Circle Awards	2015	Outstanding Actress in a Musical	The King and I	Nominated	
Outer Critics Circle Awards	2019	Outstanding Actress in a Musical	Kiss Me, Kate	Nominated	
Outer Critics Circle Awards	2024	Outstanding Lead Performer in a Broadway Musical	Days of Wine and Roses	Won	
Outer Critics Circle Awards	2026	Outstanding Lead Performer in a Broadway Play	Fallen Angels	Nominated	
Primetime Emmy Award	2018	Outstanding Actress in a Short Form Comedy or Drama Series	The Accidental Wolf	Nominated	
Screen Actors Guild Awards	2023	Outstanding Ensemble in a Drama Series	The Gilded Age	Nominated	
Tony Awards	2005	Best Featured Actress in a Musical	The Light in the Piazza	Nominated	
Tony Awards	2006	Best Actress in a Musical	The Pajama Game	Nominated	
Tony Awards	2008	Best Actress in a Musical	South Pacific	Nominated	
Tony Awards	2012	Best Actress in a Musical	Nice Work If You Can Get It	Nominated	
Tony Awards	2014	Best Actress in a Musical	The Bridges of Madison County	Nominated	
Tony Awards	2015	Best Actress in a Musical	The King and I	Won	
Tony Awards	2019	Best Actress in a Musical	Kiss Me, Kate	Nominated	
Tony Awards	2024	Best Actress in a Musical	Days of Wine and Roses	Nominated	
Tony Awards	2026	Best Actress in a Play	Fallen Angels	Nominated	
