= Silent Night (opera) =

2011 opera by Kevin Puts and Mark Campbell

- Opera by Kevin Puts
- Librettist: Mark Campbell
- Based on: Joyeux Noël
- Premiere: November 12, 2011; Minnesota Opera, Ordway Theater Saint Paul

Silent Night is an opera by composer Kevin Puts and librettist Mark Campbell. As Silent Night: Opera in Two Acts the work had its world premiere at the Ordway Theater, Saint Paul, Minnesota, on November 12, 2011 under the directorship and dramaturgy of Eric Simonson. As Silent Night, the opera had its East Coast premiere at the Philadelphia Academy of Music on February 8, 2013. It premiered in the Southwest at Bass Performance Hall with Fort Worth Opera on May 4, 2014. The European premiere took place on October 24, 2014, in a new production by Tomer Zvulun, at the Wexford Festival Opera in Ireland. In 2014 the work was staged at the Calgary Opera and the Cincinnati Opera, The Wexford production was performed at the Atlanta Opera and in 2015 it was performed at the Opéra de Montréal and the Lyric Opera of Kansas City. It received its West Coast premiere at Opera San Jose on February 11, 2017. The Glimmerglass Festival and University of Kentucky Opera Theatre presented the opera in 2018. It won the 2012 Pulitzer Prize for Music.

== Background ==
The libretto is based on the multilingual screenplay by Christian Carion for the 2005 film Joyeux Noël that tells a story during the historical short-lived spontaneous 1914 Christmas truce between enemy combatants in World War I. Depending on the characters and situations, the libretto is mostly sung in English, French and German, but also some Italian and Latin.

The opera was commissioned by Minnesota Opera as part of its New Works Initiative in co-production with Opera Philadelphia. For Kevin Puts, it was his first opera, while Mark Campbell had written librettos before.

Campbell remarked that the core message of the opera is "'War is not sustainable when you come to know your enemy as a person.' When you see that the person you might be shooting has a child or a wife or has this life at home and they’re just not the enemy, then it becomes very difficult if not impossible to sustain war."

== Roles ==
Role	Voice type	Premiere cast, November 12, 2011 (Conductor: Michael Christie)
The German Side
Nikolaus Sprink, an opera singer	tenor	William Burden, Brad Benoit
Anna Sørensen, his lover	soprano	Karin Wolverton
Lieutenant Horstmayer	baritone	Craig Irvin
Kronprinz, son of Kaiser Wilhelm II	tenor	A. J. Glueckert
The Scottish Side
Jonathan Dale	tenor	John Robert Lindsey
William Dale, his brother	baritone	Michael Nyby
Father Palmer	bass	Troy Cook
Lieutenant Gordon	baritone	Gabriel Preisser
The British Major	bass-baritone	Joseph Beutel
The French Side
Lieutenant Audebert	baritone	Liam Bonner
Ponchel, his aide-de-camp	baritone	Andrew Wilkowske
The General	bass	Ben Wager
Madeleine, Lt. Audebert's wife	soprano	Angela Mortellaro
Gueusselin, a soldier	bass-baritone	Ben Johnson
German, Scottish, and French soldiers

== Synopsis ==
=== Prologue ===
Summer, 1914: At a Berlin opera house the performance is disrupted by the announcement of war. The life and career of the singers Anna Sørensen and Nikolaus Sprink change, as Nikolaus has to go to war. In Scotland, William urges his younger brother Jonathan to enlist. In Paris, pregnant Madeleine is angry as her husband Audebert departs for war.

=== Act 1 ===
December 23, 1914: An attack by French and Scottish soldiers on the German line fails. Nikolaus stabs a man and despairs at the violence. William is shot and dies. In the bunker later, the soldiers are shocked by the slaughter.

December 24, 1914: In the morning, little Christmas trees are delivered to the German soldiers, a gift of the Kronprinz who is camping in a chalet nearby. Nikolaus is ordered to sing for him later and looks forward to reunite with Anna at that occasion. The French soldiers receive wine, sausages, and chocolates. The Scottish soldiers get crates of whisky. Later, in the evening, Anna and Nikolaus perform for the Kronprinz. Nikolaus has to return to the front, and Anna follows him. At night, a French soldier moves out with some grenades to infiltrate the German line. Some Scottish soldiers start singing. Nikolaus responds with a Christmas song ("Silent Night"), soon the Scottish bagpiper starts to accompany him, and Nikolaus raises a Christmas tree on the bunker. The Christmas truce starts as the lieutenants agree to stop fighting until the morning. The soldiers come out and the French soldier returns without using his grenades. The soldiers intermingle, talk, and exchange provisions. Anna appears. Father Palmer conducts a mass. Anna sings of peace. Jonathan, however, finds the body of his brother and vows to take revenge.

=== Act 2 ===
December 25, 1914: In the morning Jonathan buries his brother. A decision is made to extend the truce to allow for the burial of other soldiers. Later in the morning Father Palmer delivers the last rites as the bodies are carried away. During the day, the news of the truce reaches the British, French, and German headquarters. It is received with disbelief, anger, and the determination to punish the soldiers. In the evening Horstmayer wants to arrest Nikolaus for insubordination, but Anna takes his hand and leads him across the no-man's land toward the French side. Horstmayer's order to shoot him is ignored. Nikolaus and Anna ask the French for asylum.

December 26, 1914: The British Major punishes the Scottish soldiers by transferring them to the front lines. On his order, Jonathan shoots a German soldier crossing the battlefield. The soldier is actually the Frenchman, Ponchel, in a German uniform who was disguised to cross the lines and visit his mother. The French General orders Audebert to Verdun and disbands his unit. The Kronprinz transfers the German soldiers to Pomerania. The no-man's land is empty at the end.

== Critical reception ==
Puts' first opera was very well received, called "a remarkable debut". It was noted that it usually takes "a few tries to write an effective work". Larry Fuchsberg opined that "one senses that (Puts) has found his métier," admiring his ability to manage heterogeneous musical materials. Gale Martin called the work "a contemporary opera but not necessarily a modern opera" as it offered musicality and avoided dissonance, and thought it to be a "work crucial to the development and appreciation of opera as a relevant modern art form". The premiere run in 2011 was sold out.

== Awards ==
In 2012, Kevin Puts was named the Pulitzer Prize Winner in Music for Silent Night: Opera in Two Acts.

== See also ==
- List of Christmas operas
