= Thomas Lynch (set designer) =

Thomas Lynch is a professor at the University of Washington School of Drama. He teaches graduate students exclusively in opera scenery design.

== Education ==
Lynch completed his MFA at Yale under the supervision of Chinese American theatrical set designer Ming Cho Lee.

== Career ==
Before joining the University of Washington, Lynch worked as a freelance set designer in New York City for about 30 years. He has produced over 250 designs in major American theaters. He was previously a lecturer at NYU's Tisch School of the Arts.

== Awards ==
- 2008 Seattle Opera Artist of the Year Award - Der Fliegende Holländer and Iphigénie en Tauride (Winner)
- 2005 Obie Award for Design - Woman Before a Glass (Winner)
- 2001 Entertainment Design Award (EDDY) – Ring (winner)
- 2000 Tony Award for Best Scenic Design nomination - The Music Man
- 1999 Obie Award for Sustained Excellence – Betty's Summer Vacation (Winner)
- 1989 Tony Award for Best Scenic Design nomination - The Heidi Chronicles
- 16th Elliot Norton Award for Outstanding Designer - Game of Love and Chance (Winner)

== Works ==
- Der Ring des Nibelungen (2013 by Richard Wagner) – scenic designer. Produced by Seattle Opera 2013
- One Act Plays (2013 by Tennessee Williams) – scenic designer. Produced by Glenn Hughes Penthouse Theatre
- Iphigénie en Tauride (2011 by Christoph Willibald Gluck) – scenic designer. Produced by the Metropolitan Opera 2011
- Rodelinda (2011, by George Frideric Handel) – scenic designer. Produced by the Metropolitan Opera
- A Raisin in the Sun (2004 by Lorraine Hansberry) – scenic designer. Produced by Royale Theatre
- The Music Man (2000-2001 by Meredith Willson) – scenic designer. Produced by Neil Simon Theatre
