= Nellie Boxall =

Maid to British celebrities (1890–1965)

- Born: 2 November 1890; Farncombe
- Died: 19 November 1965; Farncombe
- Employers: Charles Laughton (1934–1936); Roger Fry (1912–1916); Virginia Woolf (1916–1934)

Nellie Boxall (1890–1965) was a domestic servant. She found notability working for Virginia Woolf. She also worked for Roger Fry and Charles Laughton. Woolf had suggested that she would make an interesting story in her diary and she noted that there were no maids in her father's Dictionary of National Biography. Boxall would be included in its successor the ODNB. Her life is the basis of several novels.

== Life ==
Boxall was born in Farncombe, Surrey. Her parents were Sarah (born Marsden) and Henry Boxall. Her father worked in agriculture and in time for a railway company but he died in 1891. Her mother had ten children and Nellie was the youngest. At the age of twelve her mother died too and she became an orphan.

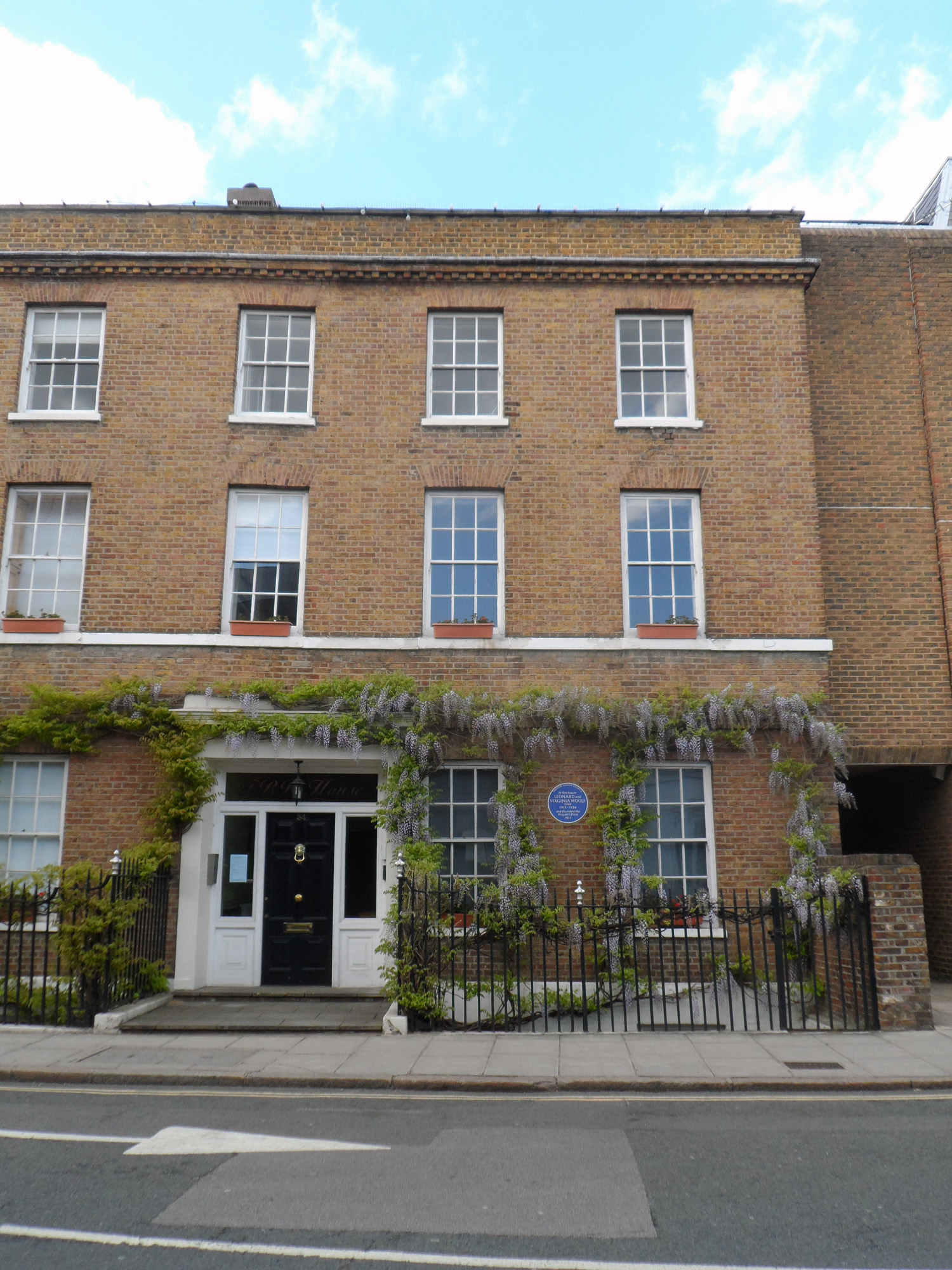
Hogarth House was her home with the Woolfs from 1916

Leonard and Virginia Woolf employed two servants at the recommendation of Roger Fry in 1916 at their home Hogarth House in Richmond.

She was educated at the local school and she went into domestic service which was the school's expectation. She obtained work near Guildford where she was employed by the painter and art critic Roger Fry at his house named Durbins. She started a lifelong friendship with Lottie Hope who was another servant. The house was modern with a dumb waiter and flush toilets, but Fry could not afford the house. In 1916 Fry recommended to his lover's sister, Virginia Woolf, that she and her husband should employ Lottie and Nellie.

Virginia Woolf was recovering from a mental breakdown. She and Leonard began making plans and in March 1917 their dining room table featured a new printing press set up on their dining room table at Hogarth House and they began what became the Hogarth Press.

Nellie's difficult relationship was recorded in Virginia's diaries and letters. Nellie and Lottie were the two live-in servants, however Virginia's mother had employed seventeen people. Virginia would report unkindly about Nellie as "loathsome", "spiteful" and a "mongrel". At other times she would be "dear Nelly (sic)". Virginia found her relationship with the servants difficult. She did not want to take her servants for granted but she could not cook so had to just write about how her servant "sweats when she is making jam".

Boxall would stay with them for eighteen years until she was sacked during a final falling out. The Woolfs offered her £25 as a leaving gift, but Boxall refused the compensation. Virginia thought that she would not easily find another job, but she moved soon nearby where she was employed by Charles Laughton and Elsa Lanchester. She was sent on cookery courses and she cooked for the visitors including Douglas Fairbanks Jr. and Marlene Dietrich. She rarely spoke about these celebrities after she returned to Farncombe in 1939 to live with Lottie Hope. She worked in a hospital and when the BBC interviewed her she spoke kindly of Virginia Woolf.

== Legacy ==
Woolf had regretted that there were no maids in her father's Dictionary of National Biography when she wrote Three Guineas. Boxall would be included in the successor to her father's work, the Oxford Dictionary of National Biography (ODNB).

Virginia Woolf's later writings include her servant although she never mentioned Boxall by name again. She had earlier written in her diary "If I were reading this diary ... I think I should seize with greed on the portrait of Nelly, & ... make the whole story revolve around that." Others have written about her. Alicia Giménez Bartlett imagined that Boxall had kept a diary and this was the basis of her work Una habitación ajena which won a Lumen Prize in 1997.

In 2007 Alison Light published Mrs Woolf & the Servants: The Hidden Heart of Domestic Service which includes Boxall.
