= Kevin Puts =

American composer (born 1972)

Kevin Matthew Puts /pʊts/ (born January 3, 1972) is an American composer, best known for his opera The Hours and for winning a Pulitzer Prize in 2012 for his first opera, Silent Night, and a Grammy Award in 2023 for his concerto Contact.

== Early life and education ==
Puts was born in St. Louis, Missouri, and grew up in Alma, Michigan. He studied composition and piano at the Eastman School of Music and Yale University, earning the Doctor of Musical Arts degree from Eastman School of Music. Among his teachers were Samuel Adler, Jacob Druckman, David Lang, Christopher Rouse, Joseph Schwantner, Martin Bresnick, and, in piano, Nelita True. He also studied at the Tanglewood Music Festival with William Bolcom and Bernard Rands.

== Career ==
He is composer-in-residence at the Fort Worth Symphony and has received a commission from the Aspen Music Festival. His Cello Concerto was premiered by Yo-Yo Ma. Puts' works have been performed by the St. Louis Symphony, the Pacific Symphony, the Utah Symphony (with Evelyn Glennie as percussion soloist), the Miró Quartet, and Concertante. He is a frequent composer in residence at the Cabrillo Festival of Contemporary Music, which commissioned his fourth symphony and his flute concerto.

His alma mater commented:

For several years, Kevin Puts received reviews describing him as a "promising composer" and "a young composer to watch". But with a flurry of recent performances and prestigious commissions, Puts can now be described as one of America's most important composers, period.

Puts was Associate Professor of Composition at the University of Texas at Austin from 1997 to 2005 and now teaches composition at the Peabody Institute of Johns Hopkins University and is a Distinguished Visiting Faculty member at The Juilliard School. His notable students include Jake Runestad and Viet Cuong.

The opera Silent Night, with score by Puts and libretto by Mark Campbell, was published by Aperto Press in 2011 and premiered by the Minnesota Opera on November 12. Puts won the annual Pulitzer Prize for Music in 2012; the citation called the piece "a stirring opera that recounts the true story of a spontaneous ceasefire [the 1914 Christmas truce] among Scottish, French and Germans during World War I, displaying versatility of style and cutting straight to the heart."

Puts's opera The Hours, with libretto by Greg Pierce, was first performed in concert form in Philadelphia at the Kimmel Center in March 2022, and then fully staged in November 2022 at the New York Metropolitan Opera. His triple concerto Contact won the 2023 Grammy Award for Best Contemporary Classical Composition.

== Awards ==
- 1992 American Academy of Arts and Letters composition prize
- 2001 Guggenheim Fellow
- 1996-1998 Young Concert Artists Composer-in-Residence
- 2002 Rome Prize of the American Academy in Rome.
- 2008 Opera Fund Awards, The Minnesota Opera: Silent Night
- 2012 Pulitzer Prize for Music for Silent Night (libretto by Mark Campbell)
- 2023 Grammy Award for Best Contemporary Classical Composition for Contact
- 2024 Composer of the Year from Musical America

== Selected works ==
=== Orchestra ===
- Network (1997), commissioned and premiered by the California Symphony Orchestra, Barry Jekowsky, conductor
- Symphony No. 1 (1999), commissioned and premiered by the California Symphony Orchestra, Barry Jekowsky, conductor
- Falling Dream (2001), commissioned and premiered by the American Composers Orchestra/BMI Foundation, Dennis Russell Davies, conductor
- John Brown's Body for Narrator and Orchestra (2001), commissioned and premiered by the Pacific Symphony Orchestra, Jack Everly, conductor
- Inspiring Beethoven (2001), commissioned and premiered by the Phoenix Symphony, Michael Hermann, conductor
- Millennium Canons (2001), commissioned and premiered by the Boston Pops and Hanson Institute for American Music, Keith Lockhart, conductor
- Symphony No. 2, Island of Innocence (2002), commissioned by the Barlow Foundation, premiered by the Cincinnati Symphony/Paavo Jaarvi conductor and Utah Symphony/Keith Lockhart conductor
- ...this noble company (2003), commissioned and premiered by the Atlanta Symphony, Jere Flint, conductor
- River's Rush (2004), commissioned and premiered by the Saint Louis Symphony in celebration of the orchestra's 125th anniversary, Leonard Slatkin, conductor
- Symphony No. 3, Vespertine (2004), commissioned by Kathryn Gould and Meet the Composer through Magnum Opus, premiered by the Marin Symphony, Alasdair Neale, conductor
- Symphony No. 4, from Mission San Juan (2007), commissioned by the Cabrillo Festival for Contemporary Music, premiered by the Cabrillo Festival Orchestra, Marin Alsop, conductor
- Two Mountain Scenes (2007), commissioned and premiered by the New York Philharmonic and the Bravo! Vail Valley Music Festival, Bramwell Tovey, conductor
- Hymn to the Sun (2008), commissioned and premiered by the Sun Valley Summer Symphony, Alasdair Neale, conductor
- The City (2016), commissioned and premiered by the Baltimore Symphony Orchestra, co-commissioned by Carnegie Hall and the Cabrillo Festival, Marin Alsop, conductor
- Silent Night Elegy (cut from his opera Silent Night) (2018), commissioned and premiered by the San Francisco Symphony, co-commissioned by the Saint Louis Symphony Orchestra and the Indianapolis Symphony Orchestra, Cristian Măcelaru, conductor
- Virelai (after Guillaume de Machaut) (2019), commissioned and premiered by the Saint Louis Symphony Orchestra, Stéphane Denève, conductor

=== Wind ensemble ===
- Chorus of Light (2003), commissioned and premiered by the University of Texas Wind Ensemble, Jerry Junkin, conductor
- Millennium Canons (band version arr. Mark Spede) (2003), commissioned and premiered by The University of Texas Wind Ensemble, Jerry Junkin, conductor

=== SATB choir ===
- To Touch the Sky (2012), SSAATTBB, commissioned by the Thelma Hunter Fund of the American Composers Forum and Conspirare, Craig Hella Johnson, conductor
- If I Were A Swan (2012), SSAATTBB, commissioned by the Thelma Hunter Fund of the American Composers Forum and Conspirare, Craig Hella Johnson, conductor

=== Concertos ===
- Concerto for Marimba and Orchestra (1997), commissioned by the Vermont Symphony Orchestra and the Kobe Ensemble of Japan, Makoto Nakura, marimba
- Concerto for Oboe and Strings No. 1 (1997), commissioned by the National Symphony Orchestra, Rudolph Vrbsky, oboe
- Concerto for Percussion and Orchestra (2006), commissioned by Orange County's Pacific Symphony and the Utah Symphony
- Sinfonia Concertante (2006), commissioned by the Minnesota Orchestra
- Concerto for Violin and Orchestra (2006), commissioned by Mr. and Mrs. Sid R. Bass for the Fort Worth Symphony Orchestra, Michael Shih, violin; Miguel Harth-Bedoya, conductor
- Vision (Concerto for Cello and Orchestra) (2006), commissioned by the Aspen Music Festival in honor of David Zinman's 70th birthday, Yo-Yo Ma, cello; David Zinman, conductor
- Nā Pali Coast (Concerto for Horn and Orchestra) (2008), commissioned by the Mobile Symphony, Jeff Leenhouts, horn; Scott Speck, conductor
- Night (Concerto for Piano and Orchestra) (2008), commissioned by the Los Angeles Chamber Orchestra, Jeffrey Kahane, piano and conductor
- Concerto for Clarinet and Orchestra (2009), commissioned by Kathryn Gould through Meet the Composer, premiered by Colorado Symphony Orchestra, Bil Jackson, clarinet; Jeffrey Kahane, conductor
- Concerto for Flute and Orchestra (2013), commissioned by Bette and Joe Hirsch, premiered by the Cabrillo Music Festival Orchestra, Adam Walker, flute; Carolyn Kuan, conductor
- Moonlight (Concerto for Oboe and Strings No. 2) (2016), commissioned by the Baltimore Symphony Orchestra, Peter Cooper, oboe; Brett Mitchell, conductor
- Contact: Triple Concerto for Two Violins, Bass and Orchestra (2022), commissioned by Time for Three, premiered by the San Francisco Symphony and The Philadelphia Orchestra

=== Song cycle ===
- The Brightness of Light (2019)

=== Opera ===
- Silent Night (2011)
- The Manchurian Candidate (2015)
- Elizabeth Cree (2017)
- The Hours (2022)
