= Peter Frechette =

American actor (born 1956)

- Born: October 3, 1956 (age 69); Warwick, Rhode Island, U.S.
- Occupation: Actor
- Years active: 1979–present
- Spouse: David Warren (m. 2017)

Peter Frechette (/frəˈʃɛt/ frə-SHET; born October 3, 1956) is an American actor of stage and screen. He received two Tony Award nominations for Eastern Standard and Our Country's Good, and frequently stars in the plays of Richard Greenberg. On television, he is well known for playing hacker George on the NBC series Profiler and Peter Montefiore on Thirtysomething. He portrayed T-Bird Louis DiMucci in the film musical Grease 2.

== Early life ==
Raised in Coventry, Rhode Island, Frechette is the youngest of five children. His father was an efficiency expert and his mother a nurse. Frechette earned a Bachelor of Fine Arts in Theater from the University of Rhode Island.

== Theater ==
Frechette first appeared on the professional stage at the Edinburgh Festival Fringe as part of the Rhode Island Summer Ensemble, starring with Chel Chenier in the comedy Pontifications on Puberty and Pigtails in 1979.

In 1981, Frechette received high praise for his work in two different productions of Harry Ruby's Songs My Mother Never Sang. The same year he starred in the one-act Off-Broadway production of In Cahoots, part of the Three Hopefuls MARATHON (featuring two other one-act productions). He left New York to work in Los Angeles, but returned in 1984 to star in Bob Merrill's Musical We're Home, and again in 1987's revised production of Flora the Red Menace (he also recorded songs for the cast album).

In 1988, Frechette returned to live in New York City and star in the Off-Broadway production of Eastern Standard by Richard Greenberg, costarring Patricia Clarkson, Dylan Baker, and Kevin Conroy. The show transferred to Broadway in December 1989 and he remained in the cast throughout the run while simultaneously filming the television series Dream Street in New Jersey (he filmed every day and performed every night for three months).

Frechette earned the Drama Desk Award, Outer Critics Circle Award and Theatre World Award for best actor, and was nominated for a Tony Award. The same year, he starred in The American Place Theatre's Off-Broadway production of Hyde in Hollywood (he would return to the role of communist screenwriter Jake Singer for a television version of the play two years later).

In 1991, he starred opposite Cherry Jones in Our Country's Good, which resulted in a second Tony nomination for best actor. The same year he co-starred in Absent Friends as grief-stricken Colin. In 1992, he appeared in Bob Merrill's last Broadway musical (and cast recording) of Hannah...1939 and Larry Kramer's autobiographical The Destiny of Me. He also appeared on Broadway in the original productions of Any Given Day (1993) and The Play's the Thing (1995), as well as the 2005 revival of The Odd Couple as Roy (and understudy for Matthew Broderick's Felix Unger).

Frechette appeared at the Roundabout Theatre in three productions: The Play's the Thing (1995), Hurrah at Last (1999) and The Dazzle (2002). For The Dazzle, he and Reg Rogers were both nominated for Drama League Award for Distinguished Performance and Lucille Lortel Award for Best Actor (Rogers won); the two shared the Obie Award for best actor for their performances as the co-dependent Collier Brothers. They originated the show in 2000 at the New York Stage and Film at Vassar College's Powerhouse Theater.

Frechette was part of the west to east coast transfer of Hurrah at Last, in the role of Laurie. He earned the Backstage West Garland Award in 1998 for his performance produced by the South Coast Repertory. He also appeared in their productions of Night and Her Stars and The Extra Man. In 2016, he returned to the theater company in the role of Joseph II in Amadeus.

Frechette was a member of the resident ensemble at the Oregon Shakespeare Festival for five years (2011–15). He has also worked with national regional companies including the Seattle Repertory Theatre, Berkeley Repertory Theatre, George Street Playhouse, Cape Playhouse, The Old Globe, La Jolla Playhouse, Mark Taper Forum, Berkshire Playhouse, and the Pasadena Playhouse as an actor and instructor since leaving New York City.

Frechette is a founding member of the New York theater company The Drama Department (along with David Warren, Cynthia Nixon, Patricia Clarkson, Hope Davis, John Slattery, Michael Rosenberg and John Cameron Mitchell).

In 2022, Frechette was in Dave Steakley's The Inheritance at the Zach Theatre in Austin, Texas.

In 2024, Frechette played Henry Lehman in The Lehman Trilogy, also at the Zach Theatre.

== Film and television ==
Frechette's made his film debut in Grease 2 (1982) as T-Bird Louis DiMucci. He appeared on the film's soundtrack (including a solo version of 'Let's Do It For Our Country', a satirical duet ballad he performed with Maureen Teefy in the film). He went on to appear in the pilot of Voyagers! (as Eddie Rickenbacker).

He appeared in two episodes of The Facts of Life which served as backdoor pilots for a series about an all-boys military academy. The would-be series would have starred Jimmy Baio with Frechette as the primary antagonist, but it was not picked up to series. He continued appearing in films, mostly horror films including The Hills Have Eyes Part II (1984), The Kindred (1987), The Unholy (1988) and Paint it Black (1989).

He had a large role in the 1984 comedy No Small Affair as Jon Cryer's older brother. He made guest appearances on Taxi, The Renegades, Hill Street Blues, Hotel, It's a Living, Cagney & Lacey, Matlock, and, most notably, in two episodes of L.A. Law as Christopher Appleton, an HIV-positive gay man who claimed to have killed his lover as an act of mercy because he was dying from AIDS.

Frechette was cast as one of the three leads of 1989's Dream Street, the unofficial blue-collar spin-off of Thirtysomething (it lasted 6 episodes, airing as a mid-season replacement). In November 1989, Frechette guest-starred in the Thirtysomething episode "Strangers" (season 3, episode 6), as Peter Montefiore, a man who goes on a date with recurring character Russell Weller (David Marshall Grant). Frechette and Weller appeared in bed, seemingly naked after having had sexual relations following a first date, generating controversy. A number of advertisers refused to run commercials during the broadcast, and ABC opted not to air the episode again during summer reruns (it has since returned to the syndication schedule and was released in the season three DVD box set).

Frechette was nominated for the Emmy Award for Outstanding Guest Actor in a Drama Series for his performance. He returned for three more episodes of Thirtysomething in season 4, a small appearance in "The Haunting of DAA" and as part of the inner-circle of friends in the episodes "New Year's Eve" and "Closing the Circle".

The same year he appeared in the first season of Law & Order as Jack Curry in 'The Reaper's Helper", an HIV positive man committing "mercy killings" for others diagnosed with AIDS. He would appear in two more episodes of Law & Order (and one episode of Law & Order: Criminal Intent). In 1992, he had a recurring role in the first season of Picket Fences.

In 1993, he co-starred in the critically acclaimed Barbarians at the Gate. The following year, he starred in the Lifetime film Against Her Will: The Carrie Buck Story. In 1996 he appeared in the pilot for the NBC series Profiler as computer expert/hacker George Fraley. Between shooting the pilot and being picked up, the producers made his character a regular and would remain on the show throughout the entire run.

In 2006, he took on the substantial role of bank manager Peter Hammond in Spike Lee's heist film Inside Man. He also appeared in small roles in various films, including The First Wives Club and Miracle at St. Anna. In 2016, he appeared as a high-powered divorce attorney on the television series Devious Maids.

== Personal life ==
Frechette's partner since 1988 is director David Warren. They married in 2017.

== Filmography ==
=== Film ===
Year	Title	Role	Notes
1982	Grease 2	Louis DiMucci	
1982	Voyager from the Unknown	Eddie Rickenbacker	
1984	The Hills Have Eyes Part II	Harry	
1984	No Small Affair	Leonard	
1987	The Kindred	Brad Baxter	
1988	The Unholy	Claude	
1989	Paint It Black	Gregory	
1996	The First Wives Club	Broadway Director	
1996	Milk & Money	Bookstore Clerk	
1997	Two in the Morning	Scott	Short film
2006	Inside Man	Peter Hammond	
2007	The Savages	Matt	
2008	Miracle at St. Anna	Peter Hammond	
2008	Gone to the Dogs	Stephen	Short film

=== Television ===
Year	Title	Role	Notes
1982	The Facts of Life	George Knight	Episodes: "The Academy", "The Big Fight"
1982	Voyagers!	Eddie Rickenbacker	Episode: "Voyagers"
1983	Taxi	Scott	Episode: "Louie Moves Uptown"
1983	The Renegades	Kane	Episode: "Film at Eleven"
1983	Hill Street Blues	Leonard Dulcimer	Episode: "A Hill of Beans"
1986	Hotel	Tom Travis	Episode: "Hearts Divided"
1986	It's a Living	Sidney	Episode: "Jump"
1986	Cagney & Lacey	Robert Sikorski	Episode: "Model Citizens"
1986	L.A. Law	Christopher Appleton	Episodes: "The Venus Butterfly", "Fly Me to the Moon"
1988	Matlock	Jimmy Collier	Episode: "The Magician"
1989	Dream Street	Harry DeBeau	Main cast (6 episodes)
1989–1991	Thirtysomething	Peter Montefiore	Recurring role (4 episodes)
1990	Hyde in Hollywood	Jake Singer	Television film
1990	Law & Order	Jack Curry	Episode: "The Reaper's Helper"
1990	Gabriel's Fire	Dakota	Episode: "The Wind Rancher"
1992	Picket Fences	D.A. Barnaby Woods	3 episodes
1993	Barbarians at the Gate	Robert Allegro	Television film
1994	Against Her Will: The Carrie Buck Story	Adam White	Television film
1994	M.A.N.T.I.S.	Edward Pascal	Episode: "Faces in the Mask"
1995	New York News	Kevin Kerns	Episodes: "Fun City", "Thin Line"
1995	Law & Order	Peter Nicodos	Episode: "Jeopardy"
1996	Chasing the Dragon	Louis	Television film
1996	The Burning Zone	Dr. Frank Matthews	Episode: "Pilot"
1996–2000	Profiler	George Fraley	Main cast (82 episodes)
2001	Family Law	Jason Quinn	Episode: "Obligations"
2002	Law & Order: Criminal Intent	Stuart Gaston	Episode: "Chinoiserie"
2003	Law & Order	Jim Wheeler	Episode: "Under God"
2016	Devious Maids	Encino Divorce Attorney	Episodes: "Blood, Sweat and Smears", "Grime and Punishment"

== Theatre credits ==
Year	Title	Role	Venue
1979	Pontifications on Puberty and Pigtails		Edinburgh Festival Fringe
1981	Songs My Mother Never Sang	Performer	Stage 73
1984	We're Home	Paul	Vineyard Theatre
1985	The Seagull	Treplev	La Jolla Playhouse
1987	Bent	Horst	Coast Playhouse
1987	Loot	Hal	Mark Taper Forum
1987–1988	Flora the Red Menace	Harry Toukarian	Vineyard Theatre
1988–1989	Eastern Standard	Drew Paley	New York City Center-Stage 1
1988–1989	Eastern Standard	Drew Paley	John Golden Theatre
1989	Hyde in Hollywood	Jake Singer	American Place Theatre
1991	Absent Friends	Colin	New York City Center-Stage 1
1991	Our Country's Good	2nd Lieutenant Ralph Clark	Nederlander Theatre
1992	Quartermaine's Terms	Mark Sackling	Berkshire Theatre Festival
1992–1993	The Destiny of Me	Benjamin Weeks	Lucille Lortel Theatre
1993	And Baby Makes Seven	Peter	Lucille Lortel Theatre
1993	Any Given Day	Eddie Benti	Longacre Theatre
1994	Sons and Fathers	Dad	Theatre Row Theatre
1994	The Great Unwashed	Bud	Theatre Row Theatre
1995	Night and Her Stars	Dan Enright	American Place Theatre
1995	Raised in Captivity	Sebastian Bliss	Vineyard Theatre
1995	The Play's the Thing	Sandor Turai	Criterion Center Stage Right
1998–1999	Hurrah at Last	Laurie	South Coast Repertory
1998–1999	Hurrah at Last	Laurie	Gramercy Theatre
2000	What the Butler Saw	Dr. Rance	Theater at St. Clement's Church
2002	The Dazzle	Homer Collyer	Gramercy Theatre
2002	Once in a Lifetime	Lawrence Vail	Adams Memorial Theater
2003	Flesh and Blood	Harry/Cody/Matt	New York Theatre Workshop
2003	Waiting for Godot	Vladimir	Geary Theater
2004	Valhalla	Ludwig of Bavaria	New York Theatre Workshop
2004	Spatter Pattern (Or, How I Got Away With It)	Dunn	Peter Jay Sharp Theater
2005–2006	The Odd Couple	Roy	Brooks Atkinson Theatre
