= Steven Pasquale =

American actor

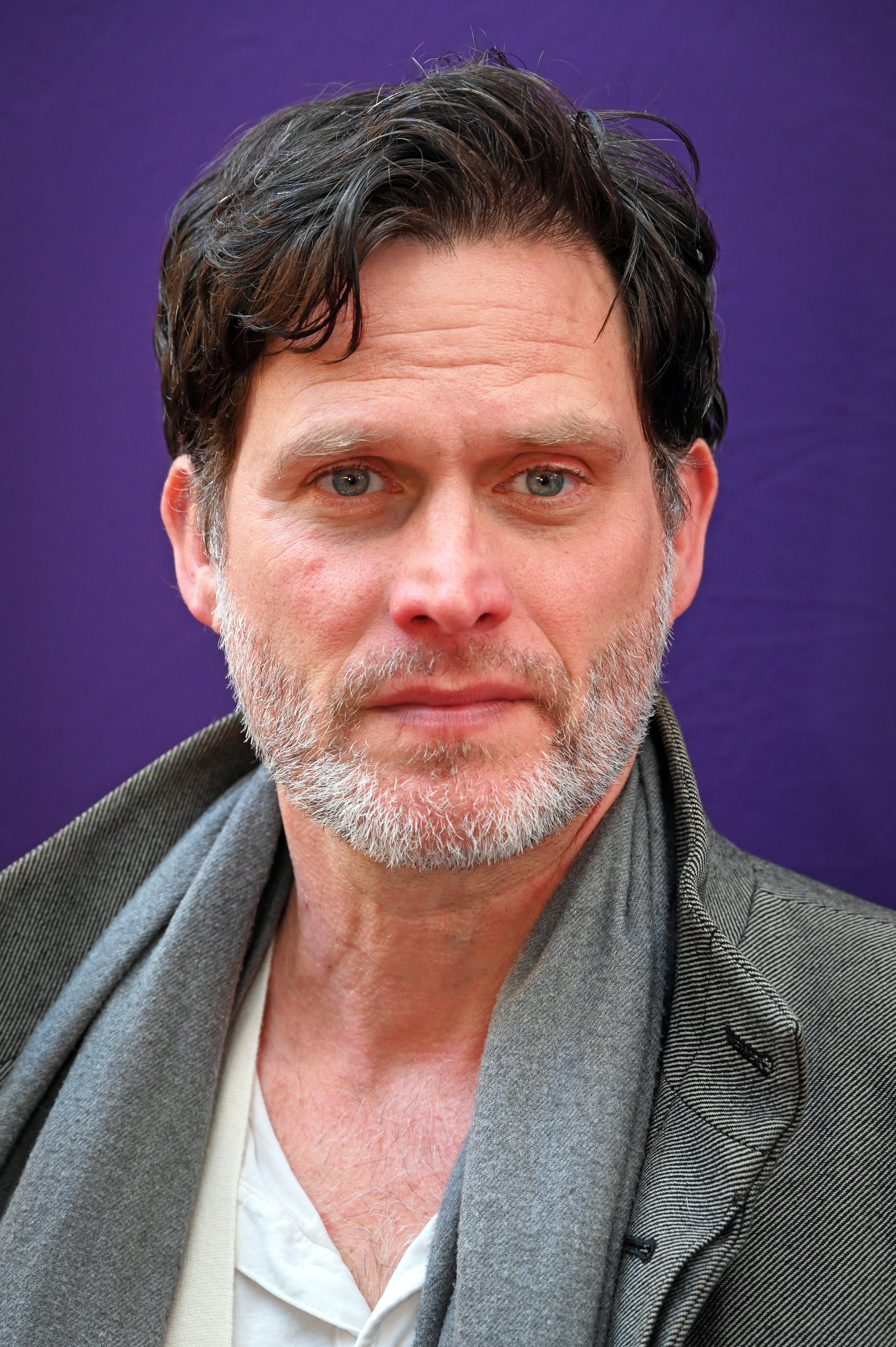
- Pasquale in 2026
- Born: November 18, 1976 (age 49); Hershey, Pennsylvania, U.S.
- Occupations: Actor, singer
- Years active: 1996–present
- Spouses: Laura Benanti (m. 2007; div. 2013) Phillipa Soo (m. 2017)
- Children: 1

Steven Pasquale (pronounced /pəsˈkwɑːl/; born November 18, 1976) is an American actor and singer. He is best known for his role as the New York City Firefighter/Emergency Medical Technician Sean Garrity in the series Rescue Me. He made his television debut on the HBO series Six Feet Under, playing a love interest for David. He has also starred in the film Aliens vs. Predator: Requiem, and as Scott in American Son, on both stage and screen.

He received a Drama Desk Award nomination in 2014 for Outstanding Actor in a Musical for his performance as Robert in the Broadway musical The Bridges of Madison County.

== Life and career ==
Pasquale was born in Hershey, Pennsylvania. He attended Bishop McDevitt High School, a Roman Catholic school in Harrisburg, Pennsylvania. Pasquale is also a 1995 YoungArts alumnus. He attended the Meadows School of the Arts at Southern Methodist University as a theatre major for one semester before moving to New York, where he starred in numerous theatre productions. He originated the role of Fabrizio in the Seattle cast of The Light in the Piazza. However, scheduling conflicts with Rescue Me prevented him from reprising the role on Broadway, a disappointment he described as "the most heartbreaking thing that I've ever experienced professionally."

He played the role of Sheriff Joe Sutter in the musical The Spitfire Grill, where he introduced the song "Forest For the Trees." He then landed the lead role of Chris in the 1998 American tour of Miss Saigon. In 2002, he played Robbie Faye in the New York production of A Man of No Importance and Archibald Craven at the Joey DiPaolo AIDS Foundation's concert of The Secret Garden alongside Michael Arden, Jaclyn Nedenthal, Will Chase, Max von Essen, Celia Keenan-Bolger, and Tony Award-winning actress Laura Benanti, whom he later married.

In April 2009, the record label PS Classics released Pasquale's first album, Somethin' Like Love, a jazz record produced by Jessica Molaskey and John Pizzarelli. He launched his official website in February 2009 and starred in the Broadway play Reasons to Be Pretty by Neil LaBute.

In 2011, Pasquale played the lead role of Paul Keller on the Fox Television Studios pilot Over/Under. The pilot was rejected in 2012 but aired on the USA Network on January 4, 2013. He also starred in the U.S. miniseries Coma.

He was the lead actor for the NBC series Do No Harm, which premiered on January 31, 2013, to the lowest debut rating in the history of prime-time television.

In 2013, Pasquale starred in The Bridges of Madison County at the Williamstown Theatre Festival, alongside Kelli O'Hara. He also starred in the Broadway production of the musical at the Gerald Schoenfeld Theatre beginning in late January 2014, with Kelli O'Hara replacing Elena Shaddow. He had previously worked with O'Hara in 2013, in the world premiere of Richard Greenberg and Scott Frankel's musical Far from Heaven, in which he portrayed Frank Whitaker.

In 2014, Pasquale guest starred in Season 6, episode 4 of the CBS legal drama series The Good Wife. He portrayed Jonathan Elfman, campaign manager for Alicia Florrick, who was played by Julianna Margulies.

He starred alongside Laura Osnes in Lyric Opera of Chicago's musical Carousel, which closed May 3, 2015.

In 2016, he portrayed Mark Fuhrman in the FX limited series American Crime Story: The People v. O.J. Simpson. He received the 2016 Lucille Lortel Award for Outstanding Lead Actor in a Musical for portraying Jamie Lockhart in the 2016 revival of The Robber Bridegroom at the Roundabout Theater Company.

In 2022, he portrayed Sky Masterson opposite his wife Phillipa Soo as Sarah Brown in the Kennedy Center production of Guys and Dolls. He was nominated for a Helen Hayes Award for his performance.

In 2024, Pasquale released "Some Other Time" with Center Stage Records, featuring John Pizzarelli on jazz guitar.

== Personal life ==
Pasquale has a daughter with his high-school sweetheart, who was born when Pasquale was twenty years old. While the couple never married, Pasquale stayed active in his daughter's life, such as driving to Pennsylvania every weekend to visit his daughter.

Pasquale was married to actress and singer Laura Benanti from 2007 to 2013. In February 2016, he became engaged to actress and singer Phillipa Soo. They married on September 24, 2017. They practice Transcendental Meditation.

== Acting credits ==
=== Film ===
| Year | Title | Role | Notes |
|---|---|---|---|
| 2004 | The Last Man | Jack Manning | |
| 2005 | Aurora Borealis | Jacob Shorter | |
| 2007 | Aliens vs. Predator: Requiem | Dallas Howard | |
| 2009 | The Answer Man | Elizabeth's date | Uncredited |
| 2019 | American Son | Scott Connor | |
| 2022 | Blue's Big City Adventure | Janitor | |

=== Television ===
| Year | Title | Role | Notes |
|---|---|---|---|
| 2001 | Six Feet Under | Kurt | 2 episodes |
| 2003 | Platinum | David Ross | Episode: "Love" |
| 2004–2011 | Rescue Me | Sean Garrity | Main; 93 episodes |
| 2010 | Marry Me | Luke Maynard | 2 episodes |
| 2011 | The Playboy Club | Young Hef | Episode: "Pilot" |
| 2011 | Submissions Only | Reed Rozelle | Episode: "The Miller/Hennigan Act" |
| 2012 | Up All Night | Luke Granby | 4 episodes |
| 2012 | Coma | Mark Bellows | 2 episodes |
| 2013 | Do No Harm | Dr. Jason Cole / Ian Price | 13 episodes |
| 2013 | Over/Under | Paul Keller | Television movie |
| 2014 | And, We're Out of Time | Jackson Cooper | Television movie |
| 2014–2015 | The Good Wife | Johnny Elfman | 13 episodes |
| 2014 | White Collar | Conrad Worth | Episode: "Taking Stock" |
| 2015–2016 | Bloodline | Alec Wolos | 8 episodes |
| 2016 | The People v. O. J. Simpson: American Crime Story | Mark Fuhrman | 5 episodes |
| 2016 | Billions | Chase | 2 episodes |
| 2016 | Almost There | Steven | 10 episodes |
| 2017 | Doubt | Billy Brennan | Main role; 13 episodes |
| 2018 | Divorce | Andrew | 4 episodes |
| 2019 | The Code | Col. "Kit" Schuylkill | Episode: "Legit Bad Day" |
| 2020 | The Comey Rule | Peter Strzok | Miniseries |
| 2021 | The Bite | Dr. Zach | 6 episodes |
| 2022 | The Good Fight | Johnny Elfman | Episode: "The End of Democracy" |
| 2022 | The Calling | Leonard Conte | 4 episodes |
| 2025 | All's Fair | Lionel Lee | Episode: "Pilot" |
| 2026 | The Four Seasons | Mark Brett | 3 episodes |

=== Theatre ===
| Year | Title | Role | Venue | Notes | Ref. |
|---|---|---|---|---|---|
| 1996–1997 | West Side Story | Gee-Tar (u/s Tony) | Various | National Tour | |
| 1997–1999 | Miss Saigon | Chris Scott | Various | National Tour | |
| 2000 | The Wild Party | Cop u/s Burrs | Manhattan Theatre Club | Off-Broadway | |
| 2000 | Spinning into Butter | Greg Sullivan | Mitzi E. Newhouse Theater | Off-Broadway | |
| 2001 | The Spitfire Grill | Joe | The Duke on 42nd Street | Off-Broadway | |
| 2002 | A Man of No Importance | Robbie Fay | Mitzi E. Newhouse Theater | Off-Broadway | |
| 2003 | The Light in the Piazza | Fabrizio Naccarelli | Intiman Theatre | Regional | |
| 2004 | Beautiful Child | Isaac | Vineyard Theatre | Off-Broadway | |
| 2005 | Fat Pig | Tom (replacement) | Lucille Lortel Theatre | Off-Broadway | |
| 2005 | A Soldier's Play | Captain Charles Taylor | Second Stage Theatre | Off-Broadway | |
| 2005 | The Secret Garden | Lord Archibald Craven | Manhattan Center Studios | Benefit Concert | |
| 2009 | Reasons to Be Pretty | Kent | Lyceum Theatre | Broadway | |
| 2012 | Far from Heaven | Frank Whitaker | Williamstown Theatre Festival | Regional | |
| 2013 | Far from Heaven | Frank Whitaker | Playwrights Horizons | Off-Broadway | |
| 2013 | The Bridges of Madison County | Robert | Williamstown Theatre Festival | Regional | |
| 2014 | The Bridges of Madison County | Robert | Gerald Schoenfeld Theatre | Broadway | |
| 2015 | Carousel | Billy Bigelow | Lyric Opera of Chicago | Regional | |
| 2015 | The Wild Party | Burrs | New York City Center Encores! | Off-Broadway | |
| 2016 | The Robber Bridegroom | Jamie Lockhart | Laura Pels Theatre | Off-Broadway | |
| 2017 | Assassins | John Wilkes Booth | New York City Center Encores! | Off-Broadway | |
| 2017–2018 | Junk | Robert Merkin | Vivian Beaumont Theatre | Broadway | |
| 2018–2019 | American Son | Scott | Booth Theatre | Broadway | |
| 2021–2022 | Assassins | John Wilkes Booth | Classic Stage Company | Off-Broadway | |
| 2022 | Assassins | John Wilkes Booth | Stephen Sondheim Theatre | Broadway Concert | |
| 2022 | Guys and Dolls | Sky Masterson | Kennedy Center | Regional | |
| 2023-2024 | Here We Are | Raffael Santello Di Santicci | The Shed | Off-Broadway | |
| 2024 | Teeth | Pastor Bill O'Keefe | Playwrights Horizons | Off-Broadway | |
| 2024 | Nine | Guido Contini | Kennedy Center | Regional | |
| 2025 | Millions | Ron | Alliance Theatre | Regional | |
| 2025 | The Bridges of Madison County | Robert | Carnegie Hall | Reunion concert | |
| 2026 | High Spirits | Charles Condomine | New York City Center Encores! | Off-Broadway | |
