= Gene Gabriel =

American actor

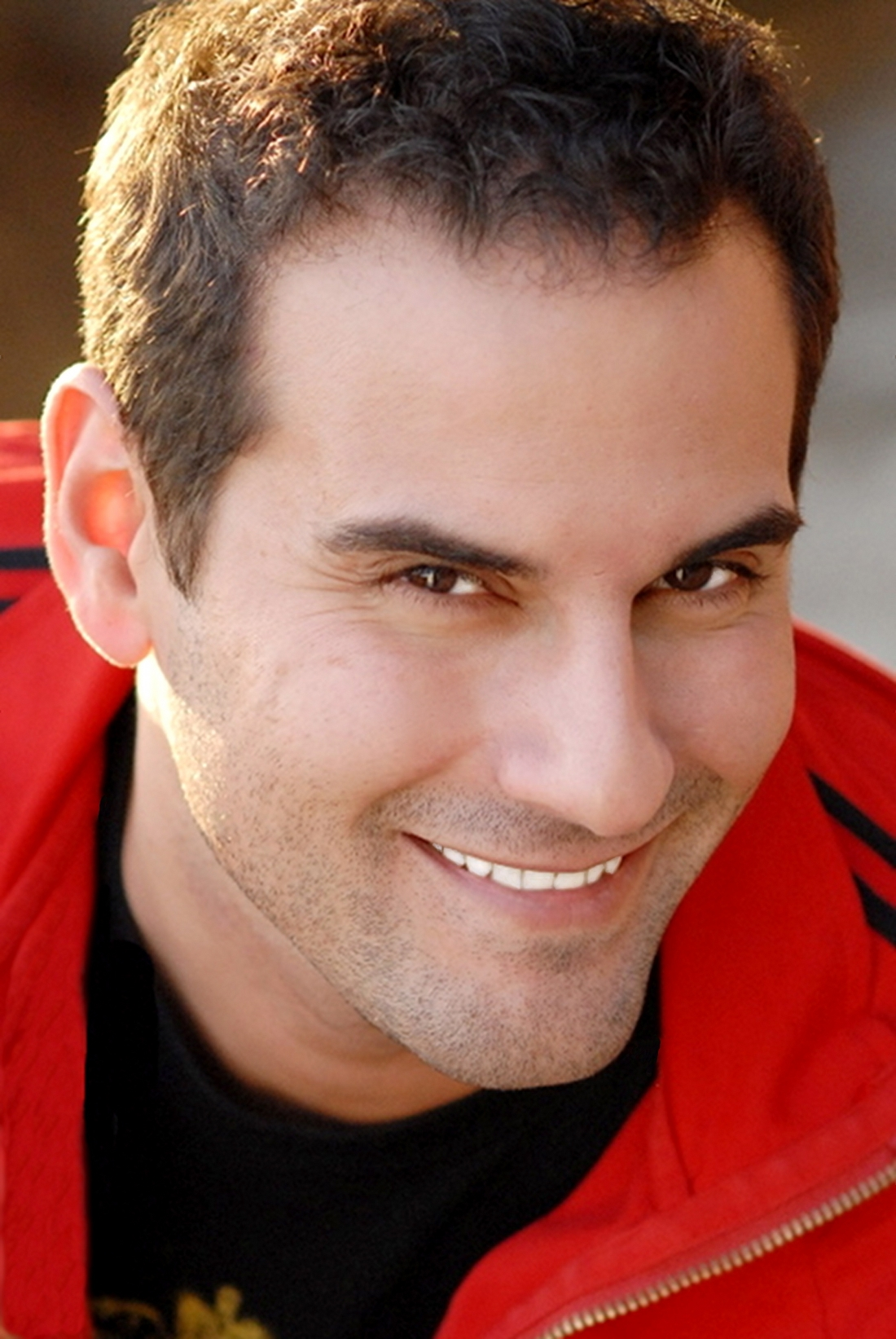
- Born: Eugene Jimenez; August 27, 1970 (age 55); New York City, New York, United States
- Occupations: Actor, writer
- Years active: 1987–present
- Spouse: Stacey Tookey (m. 2005)
- Children: 1

Gene Gabriel (born Eugene Jimenez; August 27, 1970) is a Cuban-American actor and writer most notable for originating the role of "Rodriguez" in Richard Greenberg's award-winning play Take Me Out in London and on Broadway. He is also co-founder of South Florida improv troupe Just The Funny. Most recently he has been recurring on CBS's Numb3rs and NBC's Days of Our Lives.

== Career ==
Gabriel began his acting career by writing and starring in a play in the fifth grade. In 1990 he got his first professional gig in a small role in Joseph Vásquez's film The Bronx War. His family eventually relocated to Miami and he soon followed. He continued to work in local theatre there appearing in several plays. In 1995 he answered an ad for an improv comedy troupe to be one of their apprentices. The troupe was 'Laughing Gas (improv)'. Gene soon became one of their star apprentices and almost immediately became a company member.

In 1998 he and nine other members co-founded what has now become South Florida's number one comedy improv troupe and training center, Just The Funny.

He starred in director Luis Saumell's award-winning Spanish language short, Porque.

He returned to New York in the summer of 1999. He worked with Freestyle Repertory Theatre an improv comedy troupe that also toured the tri-state area performing and educating children in improv as well as performing a weekly adult show. In early 2002 he auditioned for and won the part of Rodriguez an immigrant baseball player who refuses to speak English to his teammates in Richard Greenberg's play Take Me Out. The play opened at the Donmar Warehouse in London to rave reviews and then moved on to the Joseph Papp Public Theater in New York. The play transferred to Broadway in early 2003 and won three Tony's including best play for Greenberg and best director for Joe Mantello.

He is thanked in the published version of the play along with fellow cast members James Yaegashi and Robert M. Jimenez.

Gabriel has appeared on the Broadway stage originating the role of "Rodriguez" in Take Me Out and opposite Matthew Broderick, Nathan Lane and Brad Garrett in The Odd Couple. He has appeared in the films Brittany Runs a Marathon, The Informer, Return to Danger, Death of a Fool, Lift Me Up, Rich Boy, Rich Girl, The Evil Gene and on TV shows such as Bull, Instinct, The Good Fight, The Blacklist, Homeland, The Sopranos, Walker, Texas Ranger, Guiding Light, Law & Order: Criminal Intent . He has had recurring roles on the CBS show Numb3rs, One Life to Live, Days of Our Lives,

He is the star, writer and director of the award winning short film Sane People. He is the creator of the series, Montecito Heights, and is the writer of an action comedy film entitled Above the Title.

== Personal life ==
Gabriel met his current wife, dancer/choreographer Stacey Tookey, on a blind date several years ago in New York City. The two married in October 2005. They have a daughter born in January 2015.

== See also ==
- List of Cuban Americans
