= Jake Lucas =

American actor

Jake Lucas is an American actor with credits in musical theatre, film and television. After appearances in the children's chorus of the Metropolitan Opera and in other musicals on and off-Broadway, he appeared as Louis Leonowens in the 2015 Broadway revival of The King and I, which won the Tony Award for Best Revival of a Musical.

== Life and career ==
Born in Atlanta, Georgia to Ed and Karri Lucas, Lucas moved with his family to New York City when he was three years old. His parents own and run a software consulting company. He performed at an early age with the New York Boys Choir and Metropolitan Opera's children's chorus. He has appeared in three operas at the Met, Hansel and Gretel (2011), Billy Budd (2012), and Tosca (2012).

Lucas made his Broadway debut in September 2012 as Les in Newsies. He then appeared in 2013 as David Whitaker in Scott Frankel and Michael Korie's musical Far from Heaven, which ran Off-Broadway at Playwrights Horizons. The mother of his character in the show was portrayed by Kelli O'Hara. He also starred as Ralphie in A Christmas Story: The Musical at Madison Square Garden (2013) and on tour. Lucas also played the son of O'Hara's character in two subsequent projects: first in his television debut as John Darling to O'Hara's Mrs. Darling in NBC's Peter Pan Live! (2014), and then as Louis Leonowens to O'Hara's Anna Leonowens in the 2015 Broadway revival of The King and I by Rodgers and Hammerstein, which won the Tony Award for Best Revival of a Musical.

Lucas' younger sister is actress Sydney Lucas. Jake and Sydney appeared together in a commercial for Campbell's cream of mushroom soup and alongside Jennifer Aniston in the movie She's Funny That Way, which was released in 2015.

== Credits ==
=== Broadway ===
Year	Show	Role	Notes
2012	Newsies	Les	Nederlander Theatre
2015	The King and I	Louis Leonowens	Vivian Beaumont Theatre

=== Television ===
Year	Show	Role	Notes
2014	Peter Pan Live!	John Darling	NBC

=== Film ===
Year	Show	Role	Notes
2014	She's Funny That Way	David Albertson	Clarius Entertainment
