= The Destiny of Me =

1992 play by Larry Kramer

- Cover of the Grove Press paperback edition
- Original language: English
- Written by: Larry Kramer
- Subject: HIV/AIDS in the United States
- Genre: Drama
- Setting: National Institutes of Health

Premiere
- Date: October 11, 1992
- Place: Lucille Lortel Theatre; New York City

The Destiny of Me is a 1992 American play by Larry Kramer. The play follows Ned Weeks, a character from Kramer's 1985 play The Normal Heart. The play premiered off-Broadway in 1992, and was a finalist for the Pulitzer Prize for Drama.

== Overview ==
The Destiny of Me focuses on Ned Weeks, a character introduced in The Normal Heart, as he checks into the National Institutes of Health to undergo an experimental treatment for AIDS. Much of his story is told in flashback, as Ned recalls growing up as Alexander in a Jewish household where, as a hardcore theatre aficionado, he imitates Cornelia Otis Skinner and Mary Martin and adorns his bedroom with Broadway posters. He constantly is beaten by his father Richard, a government employee who never fulfilled the promise of his Yale education, for being "different" and a "sissy," while his sympathetic but complacent mother Rena fails to intervene. Meanwhile, both parents dote on his brother Benjamin, who grows up to become a successful attorney with a dazzling career.

== Productions ==
The play premiered Off-Broadway, produced by the Circle Repertory Company, at the Lucille Lortel Theatre on October 11, 1992 and closed on March 21, 1993 after 198 performances. Directed by Marshall W. Mason, the cast included John Cameron Mitchell as Alexander, Jonathan Hadary as Ned, David Spielberg as Richard, Piper Laurie as Rena, and Peter Frechette as Benjamin.

Larry Kramer was nominated for the 1993 Pulitzer Prize for Drama. Kramer won the Obie Award and the 1993 Lucille Lortel Award for Outstanding Play, and John Cameron Mitchell won the Obie Award, Performance, and was nominated for a Drama Desk Award as Best Actor in a play.

A one-night only benefit reading was held of the play in 2018, presented by The New Group. The reading featured Mark Ruffalo reprising his role as Ned Weeks from the film adaptation of The Normal Heart, Lee Pace as Benjamin, Ellen Barkin as Rena, Eric Bogosian as Richard, Gideon Glick as Alexander, and Josh Hamilton as Dr. Thomas Hamilton. Edie Falco read the stage directions.

== Critical response ==
Frank Rich of The New York Times observed, "No one can accuse Mr. Kramer of being a boy who cried wolf. History may judge this impossible, reflexively contentious man a patriot. But what makes The Destiny of Me so fascinating, and at times overwhelmingly powerful, is not so much its expected single-mindedness about AIDS as its unexpectedly relentless pursuit of the crusader at center stage. Mr. Kramer cannot solve the medical mystery of the virus or the psychological mystery of the world's tardy response to the peril. What he can try to crack is his own mystery: Why was he of all people destined to scream bloody murder with the aim of altering the destiny of the human race? The writing in The Destiny of Me can fall short of Mr. Kramer's ambitions, but it is never less than scaldingly honest." He continued, "Not by happenstance is The Destiny of Me a juicy, three-act memory play in the mode of that Arthur Miller-Tennessee Williams era, with occasional flashes of humor reminiscent of latter-day variations on the form by Neil Simon and Herb Gardner... Given the conventionality of Mr. Kramer's dramatic format, one sometimes wishes the dialogue fleshing it out were finer. He has a good ear, but it is the ear of a journalist, not a poet."
