= Life Under Water =

- Genre: Comedy; Drama; Romance
- Written by: Richard Greenberg
- Directed by: Jay Holman
- Starring: Sarah Jessica Parker; Haviland Morris; Keanu Reeves; Joanna Gleason; Stephen McHattie
- Music by: Peter Scherer
- Country of origin: United States
- Original language: English

Production
- Producer: Jay Holman
- Cinematography: Bobby Bukowski
- Editor: Elizabeth Kling
- Running time: 56 minutes
- Production company: American Playhouse

Original release
- Network: PBS
- Release: April 12, 1989

Life Under Water is a 1989 American made-for-television romantic comedy-drama film starring Sarah Jessica Parker, Joanna Gleason and Keanu Reeves. It was written by Richard Greenberg, based on his play. It was broadcast on the PBS television program American Playhouse on April 12, 1989.

== Background ==
The play on which this telefilm is based, also titled Life Under Water, premiered Off-Broadway at the Ensemble Studio Theatre in May 1985. Directed by Don Scardino, the cast featured Alexa Kenin (Amy-Joy), Amanda Plummer (Amy-Beth), Andrew McCarthy (Kip), Jill Eikenberry (Jinx), and Larry Bryggman (Hank). The play takes place in the summer on Long Island's South Fork.

== Plot ==
20 year old Kip moves out of his mother's home in the Hamptons, Long Island. His divorced mother, Jinx, is having an affair with Hank. Kip meets 2 young women on the beach—Amy-Beth and Amy-Joy. Amy-Joy insists that sea-monsters are real; Amy-Beth has had a nervous breakdown. Both are selfishly preoccupied with their own lives.
