= Take Me Out (play) =

2002 play by Richard Greenberg

- Original language: English
- Written by: Richard Greenberg
- Characters: Darren Lemming; Kippy Sunderstrom; Mason Marzac; Shane Mungitt; Davey Battle; Toddy Koovitz; Rodriguez; Martinez; Skipper; William R. Danziger; Jason Chenier; Takeshi Kawabata; Policemen
- Subject: Homophobia, racism, and class in sport
- Genre: Drama
- Setting: A baseball locker room

Premiere
- Date: 2002
- Place: Donmar Warehouse; London, England

Take Me Out is a play by American playwright Richard Greenberg. After a staging at the Donmar Warehouse in London, it premiered Off-Broadway on September 5, 2002, at the Joseph Papp Public Theater. It made its Broadway debut on February 27, 2003, at the Walter Kerr Theatre, where it ran for 355 performances and won the 2003 Tony Award for Best Play. A Broadway revival opened at the Hayes Theater on April 4, 2022.

== Background ==
As of 2025, no Major League Baseball (MLB) player has ever come out of the closet to the public during his career. The play is the dramatic exploration of what such an event might be like.

Playwright Greenberg has stated that one of the compulsions for creating a baseball play was his complete immersion into the sport in 1999 after following the New York Yankees' (then-)record 114-win season the previous year, beginning with David Wells' perfect game. Many believe the inspiration for Darren Lemming is former American Major League Baseball player Derek Jeter of the Yankees, and for racist pitcher Shane Mungitt, former National League pitcher John Rocker, then of the Atlanta Braves.

== Plot ==
Much of the play is set in the locker room of a professional baseball team, and as such has an all-male cast that explores themes of homophobia, racism, class, and masculinity in sports.

=== Act I ===
Darren Lemming, a star mixed-race center fielder for the fictional Empires Major League Baseball team, comes out as gay. His friend and teammate Kippy Sunderstrom warns Darren that the team will feel uncomfortable about his sexual orientation, but is brushed off by Darren. As Kippy wonders why Darren chose that particular moment in time to come out, a flashback to a week earlier shows Darren having drinks with his best friend Davey Battle, a religious player on a rival team. Davey tells Darren that he should want his true nature known to the world. Later, Darren meets with his new accountant Mason Marzac, a gay man uninterested in baseball until Darren's coming out.

The Empires fall into a slump, prompting relief pitcher Shane Mungitt to be brought up from the minor leagues. Shane tells the team that as a child, he was raised in orphanages after his father killed his mother and then himself in a murder-suicide. The team begins winning games again, but in a television interview, Mungitt expresses his discomfort with "colored people" on the team, and that he has to shower every night with a "faggot."

=== Act II ===
Shane is suspended due to the interview, causing the team to fall back into its slump. He writes an apology letter that is leaked to the public, which combined with the details about his tragic childhood, causes public sympathy to shift in his favor. Shane returns to the team, despite Darren's threat to retire in protest. In the locker room showers, Darren derides Shane for his racism and homophobia, and mockingly kisses him. In the game, Shane is sent to pitch against Davey Battle; the ball hits Davey's head, killing him.

=== Act III ===
In a flashback to Darren and Davey's final encounter, Davey angrily accuses Darren of using his straight-and-narrow public reputation to conceal his sexuality. Shane is permanently suspended from major league baseball, and arrested for questioning after players say they heard him muttering about wanting to "kill someone" before the game. He refuses to speak to the police, stating that he will only talk to Kippy. Kippy is joined by Darren, and as Kippy attempts to determine whether the pitch that killed Davey was intentional, Shane discloses that the apology letter was written by Kippy on Shane's behalf.

In narration, Kippy states to the audience that the Empires went on to win the World Series, and no charges were ever filed against Shane. Kippy expresses to Darren his desire to again be friends, and Darren invites Mason to the end-of-season party.

== Productions ==
=== London (2002) ===
The show received its world premiere at the Donmar Warehouse in London on June 20, 2002. The production was directed by Joe Mantello and starred Daniel Sunjata, Denis O'Hare, Neal Huff, Frederick Weller, Kevin Carroll, Dominic Fumusa, Gene Gabriel, Robert M. Jimenez, Joe Lisi, Kohl Sudduth, and James Yaegashi. It ran until August 3 of the same year.

The production transferred off-Broadway to the Joseph Papp Public Theater later that year with the same cast and direction where it ran until 2003.

=== Broadway (2003–2004) ===
The next year, the show transferred to the Walter Kerr Theatre on Broadway with the same cast with the exception of Dominic Fumusa, who was replaced by David Eigenberg. It opened on February 27, 2003. It featured designs by Scott Pask (scenic), Jess Goldstein (costume), Kevin Adams (lighting), and Janet Kalas (sound). At the 2003 Tony Awards, the production won the award for Best Play, Mantello won Best Direction of a Play, and O'Hare won Best Performance by a Featured Actor in a Play. It closed on January 4, 2004, after 355 performances.

=== Broadway revival (2022) ===
A Broadway revival opened at the Hayes Theater on April 4, 2022. It was originally scheduled to begin previews on April 2, 2020, and officially open on April 23. However, due to the COVID-19 pandemic, the show suspended production on March 12. The cast is made up of Jesse Williams, Jesse Tyler Ferguson, Patrick J. Adams, Michael Oberholtzer, Brandon L. Dirden, Carl Lundstedt, Hiram Delgado, Ken Marks, Eduardo Ramos, Tyler Lansing Weaks, and Julian Cihi. The production was directed by Scott Ellis and had a production team including David Rockwell (scenic), Linda Cho (costumes), Kenneth Posner (lighting), and Fitz Patton (sound). The production began previews on March 10, 2022, and officially opened on April 4. It closed on June 11.

The Broadway revival had a very strict policy regarding phones and required that all audience members place their phones in locked Yondr pouches prior to the show. However, on May 9, 2022, a video leaked online of a scene of Williams during the shower scene in which he is fully nude. The Actors' Equity Association, Jesse Tyler Ferguson, and 2nd Stage, the owner of the Helen Hayes Theater, released statements sharing their disgust. The latter stated they would be adding additional staff to enforce the "no phones" policy.

On June 12, 2022, the Broadway revival won Best Revival of a Play at the 75th Tony Awards.

The revival was remounted at the Gerald Schoenfeld Theatre and began performances on October 27, 2022, for a limited run of 14 weeks. Due to previous filming engagement, Adams was unable to return and Bill Heck assumed the role of Kippy for the return engagement.

=== Other productions ===
==== Singapore ====
A limited-run production opened at the DBS Arts Centre in Singapore on January 8, 2014, and closed on January 31.

== Notable casts ==
Character	London	Broadway	Singapore	Broadway Revival
Character	2002	2003	2014	2022
Darren Lemming	Daniel Sunjata	Daniel Sunjata	Juan Jackson	Jesse Williams
Mason Marzac	Denis O'Hare	Denis O'Hare	Hayden Tee	Jesse Tyler Ferguson
Kippy Sunderstrom	Neal Huff	Neal Huff	Tim Garner	Patrick J. Adams
Shane Mungitt	Frederick Weller	Frederick Weller	Chris Bucko	Michael Oberholtzer
Davey Battle	Kevin Carroll	Kevin Carroll	Johnny James	Brandon J. Dirden
Toddy Koovitz	Dominic Fumusa	David Eigenberg	Seth Adams	Carl Lundstedt
Rodriguez/Policeman	Gene Gabriel	Gene Gabriel	Ren Robles	Eduardo Ramos
Martinez/Policeman	Robert M. Jimenez	Robert M. Jimenez	Jejie Esguerra	Hiram Delgado
Skipper/William R. Danziger	Joe Lisi	Joe Lisi	Paul Lucas	Ken Marks
Jason Chenier	Kohl Sudduth	Kohl Sudduth	Kynan Francis	Tyler Lansing Weaks
Takeshi Kawabata	James Yaegashi	James Yaegashi	Hiro Mizuhara	Julian Cihi

=== Notable replacements ===
==== Broadway Revival (2022) ====
- Kippy Sunderstrom: Bill Heck

== Awards and nominations ==
=== Original Broadway production ===
Year	Award	Category	Nominated work	Result
2003	Tony Award	Best Play		Won
2003	Tony Award	Best Featured Actor in a Play	Denis O'Hare	Won
2003	Tony Award	Best Featured Actor in a Play	Daniel Sunjata	Nominated
2003	Tony Award	Best Direction of a Play	Joe Mantello	Won
2003	Drama Desk Award	Outstanding Play		Won
2003	Drama Desk Award	Outstanding Actor in a Play	Daniel Sunjata	Nominated
2003	Drama Desk Award	Outstanding Director of a Play	Joe Mantello	Nominated
2003	Drama Desk Award	Outstanding Featured Actor in a Play	Denis O'Hare	Won
2003	Drama Desk Award	Outstanding Featured Actor in a Play	Frederick Weller	Nominated
2003	Drama Desk Award	Outstanding Set Design	Scott Pask	Nominated
2003	Drama Desk Award	Outstanding Sound Design in a Play	Janet Kalas	Nominated
2003	Drama Desk Award	Outstanding Lighting Design	Kevin Adams	Nominated
2003	Drama League Award	Drama League Award for Distinguished Production of a Play		Won
2003	Lucille Lortel Award	Outstanding Play		Won
2003	New York Drama Critics' Circle Award	Best Play		Won
2003	Pulitzer Prize	Pulitzer Prize for Drama		Nominated

=== 2022 Broadway Revival ===
Year	Award	Category	Nominated work	Result
2022	Tony Awards	Best Revival of a Play		Won
2022	Tony Awards	Best Featured Actor in a Play	Jesse Tyler Ferguson	Won
2022	Tony Awards	Best Featured Actor in a Play	Michael Oberholtzer	Nominated
2022	Tony Awards	Best Featured Actor in a Play	Jesse Williams	Nominated
2022	Drama Desk Awards	Outstanding Actor in a Play	Jesse Tyler Ferguson	Nominated
2022	Drama League Awards	Outstanding Revival of a Broadway or Off-Broadway Play		Won
2022	Drama League Awards	Distinguished Performance Award	Jesse Williams	Nominated
2022	Drama League Awards	Distinguished Performance Award	Jesse Tyler Ferguson	Nominated
2022	Outer Critics Circle Awards	Outstanding Revival of a Play (Broadway or Off-Broadway)		Won
2022	Outer Critics Circle Awards	Outstanding Actor in a Play	Patrick J Adams	Nominated
2022	Outer Critics Circle Awards	Outstanding Featured Actor in a Play	Jesse Tyler Ferguson	Won
2022	Outer Critics Circle Awards	Outstanding Featured Actor in a Play	Michael Oberholtzer	Nominated
2022	Outer Critics Circle Awards	Outstanding Director of a Play	Scott Ellis	Nominated
2022	Theatre World Award		Patrick J Adams	Honoree

== TV series ==
In August 2021, it was reported that Anonymous Content would be adapting the play into a limited television series. Jesse Williams will star and Scott Ellis will direct the pilot written by Greenberg.
