= Necessary Evil: Super-Villains of DC Comics =

- Directed by: Scott Devine; J.M. Kenny
- Written by: Scott Devine; Jack Mulligan
- Produced by: Scott Devine; J.M. Kenny
- Narrated by: Christopher Lee
- Cinematography: Adam Biggs
- Edited by: Ryan Halferty; Shay Thompson
- Production companies: DC Entertainment mOcean
- Distributed by: Warner Home Video
- Release dates: June 2013 (San Diego Comic-Con); October 25, 2013 (United States)
- Running time: 99 minutes
- Country: United States
- Language: English

Necessary Evil: Super-Villains of DC Comics is a 2013 American direct-to-video documentary film about DC Comics super villains. It was produced and directed by Scott Devine and J.M. Kenny, with narration provided by English actor Christopher Lee, and was released on DVD and Blu-ray by Warner Home Video on October 25, 2013.

== Synopsis ==
Necessary Evil: Super-Villains of DC Comics explores the roles that DC villains have had in shaping the stories that they appear in.

== Development ==
The film was announced in March 2013, with production on the film beginning on March 30 and Christopher Lee narrating the film. The film premiered at the 2013 San Diego Comic-Con. Lee recorded a message about the film that was presented at Comic-Con. He was chosen to narrate the film because of his experience of playing villains. Geoff Johns, Kevin Shinick, Andrea Romano, JM Kinney, and Scott Devine promoted the film at a panel at Comic-Con.

The film was released on DVD and Blu-ray Disc on October 25 of the same year. Interviewees appearing in the film include Guillermo del Toro, Zack Snyder and Richard Donner.

== Cast ==
- Christopher Lee – narrator (voice only)
- Clancy Brown
- Claudia Black
- Kevin Conroy
- Guillermo del Toro
- Richard Donner
- Geoff Johns
- Dr. Travis Langley
- Jim Lee
- Dr. Andrea Letamendi
- Andrea Romano
- Scott Snyder
- Zack Snyder
- Michael Uslan
- Len Wein
- CM Punk
- Marv Wolfman
- Paul Dini
- Bobbie Chase
- Bob Harras
- Scott Porter
- Peter Tomasi
- Dan Didio
- Brian Azzarello
- Marc Guggenheim
- Phil Morris
- Andrew Kreisberg
- Doug Mahnke
- Neal Adams
- James Robinson
- Paul Levitz
- Kevin Shinick
- Glen Murakami
- Tony Daniel
- Ames Kirshen
- Alan Burnett
- Brian Buccellato
- Mike Carlin
- Michael Shannon
- Ed Boon
- Geoff Boucher
