= Eastern Standard =

Play by Richard Greenberg

- 1989 Playbill cover
- Original language: English
- Written by: Richard Greenberg
- Genre: Comedy
- Setting: Manhattan; The Hamptons

Premiere
- Date: May 1988
- Place: Seattle Repertory Theatre

Eastern Standard is a play by Richard Greenberg. Set in 1987, it focuses on yuppies, AIDS, the stock market and insider trading scandals, homelessness, and urban malaise.

== Plot ==
In the first act, very successful but disenchanted architect Stephen Wheeler is lunching with his best friend from their days at Dartmouth College, rising avant-garde gay artist Drew Paley, in a trendy restaurant on the Upper East Side of Manhattan. Seated at the adjoining table are Wall Street investment counselor Phoebe Kidde and her television producer brother Peter, who has just revealed he has AIDS to her. When boisterous homeless woman May Logan enters the restaurant and creates a scene, the four diners and their frazzled waitress Ellen find themselves thrown together, and they eventually strike up an unlikely alliance.

In the second act, six months have elapsed, and the sextet are spending the weekend at Stephen's summer house in The Hamptons. Stephen and Phoebe find they share a mutual attraction, while Peter, unprepared to discuss his recent diagnosis, is trying to discourage Drew's amorous advances. Representing the lower class are Ellen and May, whose presence forces everyone to reexamine their lives and reevaluate their priorities.

== Productions ==
The play's premiere production was at the Seattle Repertory Theatre in May 1988. Directed by Michael Engler, the cast included Harry Groener as Stephen, Tom Hulce as Drew, Valerie Mahaffey as Phoebe, Michael Cerveris as Peter, Barbara Garrick as Ellen, and Marjorie Nelson as May.

The Manhattan Theatre Club presented the play at the Off-Broadway New York City Center, opening on October 27, 1988, and closing on December 4, 1988. Again directed by Michael Engler, the cast included Dylan Baker as Stephen, Peter Frechette as Drew, Patricia Clarkson as Phoebe, Kevin Conroy as Peter, Barbara Garrick as Ellen, and Anne Meara as May.

A critical success, the production transferred to Broadway at the John Golden Theatre, where it began previews on December 19, 1988 and officially opened on January 5, 1989. It closed on March 25 after 92 performances. Both Baker and Frechette won the Theatre World Award, and Frechette won the Drama Desk Award for Outstanding Featured Actor in a Play and was nominated for the Tony Award for Best Performance by a Featured Actor in a Play.

Eastern Standard was the first of Greenberg's plays to run on Broadway. The New York Times noted that the play "was ensconsed on Broadway... after successful engagements at the Seattle Repertory and Manhattan Theatre Club." The play had six sold-out weeks off-Broadway.

== Critical reception ==
In his review in The New York Times, Frank Rich said the playwright "captures the romantic sophistication of the most sublime comedies ever made in this country: those produced by Hollywood from the middle of the Depression until the waning days of World War II. Mr. Greenberg's characters have youth, brains, money and classy professions. Their last names . . . are redolent of Philip Barry's Park Avenue; their fresh good looks and bubbly voices recall Katharine Hepburn and Henry Fonda. And like Carole Lombard, the heiress who adopts a tramp in My Man Godfrey, or Joel McCrea, the Hollywood director who goes underground as a hobo in Sullivan's Travels, they are driven by conscience to see how the other half lives . . . . If Mr. Greenberg's only achievement were to re-create the joy of screwball comedies, from their elegant structure to their endlessly quotable dialogue, Eastern Standard would be merely dazzling good fun. But what gives this play its unexpected weight and subversive punch is its author's ability to fold the traumas of his own time into vintage comedy without sacrificing the integrity of either his troubling content or his effervescent theatrical form . . . For anyone who has been waiting for a play that tells what it is like to be more or less middle-class, more or less young and more or less well-intentioned in a frightening city at this moment in this time zone, Eastern Standard at long last is it."

Michael Kuchwara, in his review for the Associated Press, wrote: "Alternately compassionate and caustic, funny and sad, Eastern Standard marks the arrival of a major playwrighting talent who has been percolating on the theater scene for several years....With Eastern Standard, the playwright tackles bigger, more ambitious themes. He mixes his materialistic and upwardly mobile characters with such up-to-the-minute social concerns as the homeless and AIDS. It makes for an intriguing theatrical confrontation as his complaisant people face some unpleasant aspects of their society as well as their own social conventions."

== Awards and nominations ==
=== Original Broadway production ===
Year	Award	Category	Nominee	Result
1989	Tony Award	Best Featured Actor in a Play	Peter Frechette	Nominated
1989	Drama Desk Award	Outstanding Featured Actor in a Play	Peter Frechette	Won
1989	Theatre World Award		Dylan Baker and Peter Frechette	Won
