= Far from Heaven (musical) =

Far From Heaven
- Music: Scott Frankel
- Lyrics: Michael Korie
- Book: Richard Greenberg
- Basis: Far From Heaven by Todd Haynes
- Productions: 2012 Williamstown; 2013 Off-Broadway

Far From Heaven is a 2013 musical with a book by Richard Greenberg, music by Scott Frankel, and lyrics by Michael Korie. The musical is adapted from Todd Haynes's 2002 film of the same name. The musical tells the story of Cathy Whitaker, a 1950s housewife, living in wealthy suburban Connecticut as she sees her seemingly perfect life begin to fall apart. The musical deals with complex contemporary issues such as race, gender roles, sexual orientation and class.

== Production ==
The musical had a developmental premiere at the Williamstown Theatre Festival in July 2012. Directed by Michael Greif, the cast starred Kelli O'Hara and Steven Pasquale. Michael Korie explained the concept: "It's a mostly-music musical — in a Rodgers and Hammerstein vein, where you take the characters seriously. You don't write genre cream-puff songs. You write from character."

The musical premiered Off-Broadway at Playwrights Horizons on June 2, 2013 where it ran until July 7, 2013. Directed by Michael Greif, Choreographed by Alex Sanchez, the production starred Kelli O'Hara as Cathy Whitaker, Steven Pasquale as Frank Whitaker, Isaiah Johnson as Raymond Deagan, Nancy Anderson as Eleanor Fine, Quincy Tyler Bernstine as Sybil, J.B. Adams as Dr. Bowman/Morris Farnsworth, James Moye as Stan Fine, Alma Cuervo as Mona Lauder, Sarah Jane Shanks as Doreen/ Connie, Mary Stout as Mrs. Leacock and Jake Lucas as David Whitaker. Erica Aubrey was the standby.

== Plot ==
In a suburb of Hartford, Connecticut in 1957, Cathy Whitaker is an upper-middle class wife, mother and homemaker. She finds out that her husband Frank has had secret homosexual desires, which he has fulfilled. Her world is shaken but she cannot confide in her friend Eleanor. The widowed black gardener Raymond Deagan attempts to comfort her, but she is put off by gossip about them. Frank and Cathy seek help from the psychiatrist Dr. Bowman, in an attempt to "cure" Frank of his homosexual desires.

== Musical numbers ==
Source: CurtainUp

Act 1

- Seasons – Orchestra
- Autumn in Connecticut – Cathy, Sybil, David, Janice, Eleanor, Neighborhood Ladies
- You Like? – Eleanor, Cathy
- Once Upon a Time – Janice, Cathy
- If It Hadn't Been – Frank, Cathy
- Table Talk – David, Janice, Sybil, Frank, Cathy
- Mrs. Magnatech – Mrs. Leacock
- Office Talk – Frank, Connie, Stan
- Once a Week – Nancy, Doreen, Eleanor, Cathy
- Sun and Shade – Raymond, Cathy
- Table Talk – David, Sybil, Janice, Cathy
- Secrets – Frank, Cathy
- If It Hadn't Been (Reprise) – Frank
- Interesting – Gallery Patrons, Mona Lauder, Morris Farnsworth
- Miro – Raymond, Cathy
- Once a Year – Party Guests, Frank, Cathy
- Cathy, I'm Your Friend – Eleanor, Cathy
- The Only One – Cathy, Raymond

Act 2

- Rumors – Mona Lauder, Ladies
- The Only One (Reprise) – Raymond, Cathy
- Table Talk – David, Janice, Frank, Cathy
- The Feminine Touch – Jackie, Fran
- Wandering Eyes – Latin Singer
- Table Talk – Janice, David, Cathy, Frank, Sybil
- Rumors (Reprise) – Mona Lauder, Ladies
- I Never Knew – Frank
- Cathy, I'm Your Friend (Reprise) – Eleanor, Cathy
- A Picture in Your Mind – Raymond, Cathy
- Tuesdays, Thursdays – Cathy
- Table Talk – David, Janice
- Finale / Autumn in Connecticut (Reprise) – Cathy

== Critical response ==
The TheaterMania reviewer wrote: "Frankel and Korie blitz the audience with a barrage of dreamy and reflective songs with complicated harmonies, but rarely do those numbers reach a boil or satisfying resolution... Greenberg hews remarkably close to the original plot and that is a good thing in that it maintains the thing that sets 'Far From Heaven' apart from the myriad gay dramas...:The story doesn't focus on the trials and tribulations of Frank as a closeted gay man but the effect his closet has on the people around him."

== Awards and nominations ==
Nominations

- 2013 Artios Award Nomination - New York Theatre-Comedy or Musical, Alaine Alldaffer
- 2014 Lucille Lortel Award Nomination - Outstanding Costume Design, Catherine Zuber
- 2014 Outer Critics Circle Nomination - Outstanding New Off-Broadway Musical
- 2014 Drama Desk Award Nomination - Outstanding Lyrics, Michael Korie
- 2014 Henry Hewes Awards Nomination - Costume Design, Catherine Zuber
