= Peter Pan Live! =

2014 American musical television special

- Promotional poster
- Genre: Musical drama
- Based on: Peter Pan by J.M. Barrie
- Written by: Irene Mecchi
- Directed by: Rob Ashford; Glenn Weiss
- Presented by: NBC
- Starring: Allison Williams; Christian Borle; Kelli O'Hara; Taylor Louderman; Christopher Walken
- Narrated by: Minnie Driver
- Composers: Moose Charlap; Jule Styne; Carolyn Leigh; Betty Comden; Adolph Green; Amanda Green
- Country of origin: United States
- Original language: English

Production
- Executive producers: Craig Zadan; Neil Meron
- Producer: Donna Suchan Smeland
- Production companies: Universal Television; Sony Pictures Television

Original release
- Network: NBC
- Release: December 4, 2014

Related
- The Sound of Music Live!; The Wiz Live!

Peter Pan Live! is an American television special that was broadcast by NBC on December 4, 2014. The special featured a live production of the 1954 musical adaptation of Peter Pan, televised from Grumman Studios in Bethpage, New York, starring Allison Williams in the title role and Christopher Walken as Captain Hook. The special was produced by Universal Television and Sony Pictures Television.

The production was a follow-up to The Sound of Music Live!—a similar adaptation of the 1959 play The Sound of Music which aired on NBC in December 2013 and brought the network's highest Thursday-night ratings since 2004. NBC's entertainment head Bob Greenblatt would sign Craig Zadan and Neil Meron—who served as the executive producers of the special, to produce another live musical for the 2014 holiday season. Additionally, the production served as a follow-up to three productions of Peter Pan produced for NBC in 1955, 1956, and 1960 that featured cast members from its original Broadway run. While similar in content to the original, the version of Peter Pan featured in the special contained revisions to its book to emphasize the character of Captain Hook, along with additional songs from its revivals, new songs adapted from the musicals Do Re Mi and Say, Darling, and the restoration of a song that had been cut from the musical before its original Broadway premiere.

== Cast ==
- Christopher Walken as Captain Hook
- Allison Williams as Peter Pan
- Taylor Louderman as Wendy Darling
- Jake Lucas as John Darling
- John Allyn as Michael Darling
- Christian Borle as Mr. Smee/George Darling
- Kathryn Terza as Liza Darling
- Kelli O'Hara as Mrs. Darling
- Alanna Saunders as Tiger Lily
- Minnie Driver as adult Wendy/Narrator
- Caitlin Houlahan as Jane Darling
- F. Michael Haynie as Slightly Soiled
- Jason Gotay as Tootles
- Jacob and David Guzman as the Twins
- Ryan Steele as Curly
- Chris McCarrell as Nibs
- Bryce Ryness as Starkey
- Michael Park as Cecco
- Austin Lesch as Bill Jukes
- Alan H. Green as Cookson
- Chris Sullivan as Noodler
- Ryan Andes as Admiral Chrichton
- John Arthur Greene as Mullins
- Michael Hartung as Sniffler
- Garrett Hawe as Patches
- Daniel Quadrino as Bunting
- T.Oliver Reid as Oliver Shreeks
- Gary Milner as The Vicar
- Matt Wall as Skylights
- Dyllón Burnside as Prickles
- James Brown III, Dominique Kelley, Marty Lawson, Michael Munday, Andrew Pirozzi, C.J. Tyson, Keenan Washington, Charlie Williams, Alex Wong as Pirates/Lost Boys
- Helen Anker, Stephanie Kim, Sarah O'Gleby as Dancers/Indians/Native American Tribe
- Henry Gottfried as Peter Pan understudy/swing for lost boys

== Development and production ==
In December 2013, NBC presented The Sound of Music Live!—a live adaptation of the Broadway musical The Sound of Music that starred country music performer and singer Carrie Underwood and was produced by Craig Zadan and Neil Meron. After bringing NBC's highest Thursday night ratings for entertainment programming since 2004, NBC's entertainment head Bob Greenblatt announced that the network would present another live musical for the 2014 holiday season, and that it had signed Meron and Zadan on to continue their role as producers. Greenblatt felt that there were enough recognizable, family-friendly musicals to make live musicals an annual tradition, and noted that various theatrical rightsholders had expressed interest in having their musicals adapted for television in this manner. In January 2014, NBC announced that its next musical would be an adaptation of the 1954 musical Peter Pan. This would not be the first time that NBC had broadcast a live production of Peter Pan, as a presentation featuring Mary Martin, Cyril Ritchard, and its original Broadway cast was presented by NBC on March 7, 1955, as part of the anthology series Producers' Showcase. The telecast, produced by Fred Coe, was one of the highest-rated programs in the early history of television, Martin and Ritchard would reprise their roles in another live presentation in 1956, along with a color presentation in 1960 that was videotaped and rebroadcast several times afterwards.

Produced on a $10 million budget and broadcast live from the Grumman Studios in Bethpage, New York, the staff from The Sound of Music Live! was carried over to Peter Pan, including Zadan and Meron, along with David Chase as music director and Derek McLane as production designer. Whilst producing The Sound of Music Live!, Zadan and Meron shared a fondness for creating what Meron described as "moments of theatricality"—a practice that carried over into Peter Pan Live!. Meron emphasized that the production would not be bound to the limitations of a traditional stage setting, allowing for larger sets, and "dynamic" camera angles and flying sequences. In total, he described the production as a "total balls-out musical." The production employed a CGI version of Tinker Bell: rendered live and controlled by a technician, it expressed emotions and thoughts by changing its size and color.

Allison Williams, star of the HBO series Girls and daughter of NBC Nightly News anchor Brian Williams, was cast as Peter Pan, continuing an established tradition of females portraying the title character of the musical. Actor Christopher Walken was cast as Captain Hook; Walken showed uncertainty for his role in the production due to its unique format, noting that "when you do a [stage] show, even if it isn't a hit, you're in previews for a few weeks and you get comfortable in the role. This is rehearsed as a stage show, but then the cameras are there. I'm never even sure when the camera is on me." In total, the production featured 46 cast members, and a production crew of at least 350 members.

Admitting that Peter Pan was not as much of a "bona fide classic" as The Sound of Music, Meron's crew was given flexibility in revising the show's contents. Irene Mecchi — who is best known for her screenwriting contributions to films such as The Lion King – was brought in to "strengthen and deepen" the portrayal of Captain Hook in the production. Revisions were also made to its soundtrack, including the addition of new songs with lyrical adaptations by Amanda Green, the daughter of Adolph Green, who, with Jule Styne and Betty Comden, added some songs for later productions, including "Never Never Land". New songs added to the production included the Captain Hook song "Vengeance", an adaptation of "Ambition" from the Styne-Comden-Green musical Do Re Mi, "Only Pretend", adapted from "I Know About Love", also from Do Re Mi, and the Peter and Hook duet "A Wonderful World Without Peter", adapted from "Something's Always Happening On The River" from the Styne-Comden-Green musical Say, Darling. "When I Went Home", a song sung by Peter that was cut before the musical's 1954 premiere due to a "subdued" reaction in try-outs, was also restored for this production; Meron explained that the song would help viewers to "understand more" about the character of Peter Pan. "Oh My Mysterious Lady", a song written with Mary Martin in mind, was cut from the show while the song "Ugg-a-Wugg", which contained racially insensitive lyrics, was rewritten into a new song entitled "True Blood Brothers."

As in The Sound of Music Live!, Walmart served as a major sponsor of the telecast. NBC produced five themed Walmart commercials starring Melissa Joan Hart and her family, to air throughout the special. The commercials featured allusions to Peter Pan and presentations of products from the store.

== Musical numbers and soundtrack ==
A soundtrack was released on both digital and physical format by Broadway Records on December 16, 2014.

1. "Tender Shepherd" – Mrs. Darling, Wendy, Michael, John
2. "I've Gotta Crow" – Peter
3. "Never Never Land" – Peter
4. "I'm Flying" – Peter, Wendy, Michael, John
5. "Pirate Song" – The Pirates
6. "Vengeance" – Hook and the Pirates
7. "Hook's Tango" – Hook and the Pirates
8. "Indians" – Tiger Lily and the Islanders
9. "Wendy" – Peter and the Lost Boys
10. "Hook's Tarantella" – Hook and the Pirates
11. "I Won't Grow Up" – Peter, the Lost Boys, Wendy, Michael, John
12. "Only Pretend" – Wendy
13. "Wonderful World Without Peter" – Peter and Hook
14. "True Blood Brothers" – Peter, Tiger Lily, Lost Boys, Islanders, Wendy, Michael, John
15. "Distant Melody" – Wendy and Mrs. Darling
16. "When I Went Home" – Peter and Wendy
17. "I'm Flying" (reprise) – Peter
18. "Hook's Waltz" – Hook and the Pirates
19. "I've Gotta Crow" (reprise) – Peter and the company
20. "Only Pretend" (reprise) / "Tender Shepherd" (reprise) – Mrs. Darling, Wendy, Michael, John
21. "We Will Grow Up" (reprise) – Mr. and Mrs. Darling, Wendy, Michael, John, the Lost Boys, Nana
22. "Finale Ultimo: Never Never Land (reprise)" – Peter

== Reception ==
Peter Pan Live! aired on the night of December 4, 2014, on NBC and was met with immediate public and critical reactions, both positive and negative. After a mediocre reception to the network's The Sound of Music Live! from 2013, many viewers were wary of the new production. Lead actress Allison Williams warned viewers in an interview with Entertainment Weekly: "I will say this about last year: today's audiences like to watch things cynically. And I'm on a show that's cynical in tone so I'm no stranger to that … Hate-watching is a thing. It's a whole way of watching something, and it's not an audience that's natural to a non-cynical performance. Peter Pan, you cannot watch cynically. If you do, you're going to hate it, no question. It falls apart instantly." She said almost the opposite to NPR, which reported that NBC expected that "hate-watchers" would help the event to succeed. Viewers shared their opinions on social media platforms using the hashtag #PeterPanLive and on the live blog on The Guardian's website, which gave such notes as: "As long and draggy and nonsensical as the show was, NBC didn't spare any expense with the talent or production and they really pulled it off."

While many reviewers expressed relief that the broadcast did not experience any major problems, critical reviews were mixed overall. The New Yorker panned the broadcast, especially Williams and Walken. The Associated Press called the production "an oddly ponderous, disconnected, disjointed and jerky mess. If it had been a Broadway show, it would have gotten the hook (pun intended)." The New York Daily News gave it two of five stars, writing that "we just weren't feeling the pixie dust". Likewise, Variety called it "a woefully lifeless production".

The A.V. Club's Caroline Siede gave the production a B+, calling it superior to the previous year's performance and a "colorful, competent, occasionally moving piece of musical theater". USA Today gave it a mostly positive review for the production, but questioned the new material. Melissa Maerz of Entertainment Weekly also gave it a mixed review calling it "Totally fine. ... Nothing spectacular. But nothing so embarrassing as NBC's live production of The Sound of Music". The Hollywood Reporter gave the production a rave review, highlighting both Williams' and Walken's performances saying, "It was a night where everything else about the play was shunted to the side as Williams and Walken grabbed your attention. Everything that could go wrong didn't go wrong and that's a credit the myriad people behind the scenes who pulled it off."

=== Viewership ===
Peter Pan Live! was seen in its original airing by 9.21 million viewers with a ratings share of 2.4/7 among adults 18–49, making it the most-watched program of the night across the major networks—but trailing a Thursday Night Football game on NFL Network, which brought 9.1 million viewers, but had a larger 18–49 share of 3.2/10. The special also brought NBC its second-highest 18–49 ratings on Thursday night entertainment programming since The Sound of Music Live! before being surpassed by The Wiz Live! a year later. Greenblatt did not expect viewership for Peter Pan Live! to be as high as that of The Sound of Music Live!, but still felt that NBC had a "great night", and thanked the cast and crew for their involvement in "three months of the hardest work I've ever seen." Nielsen also estimated that over 475,000 posts were made about the telecast on Twitter, which were seen 106.9 million times—more than double the number of views that tweets during The Sound of Music Live! received. The special retained 61% of its viewership, from beginning to end.

A behind-the-scenes special, The Making of Peter Pan Live!, was broadcast by NBC on November 26, 2014 and seen by 3.02 million viewers. NBC showed an encore presentation of Peter Pan Live! on Saturday, December 13, 2014. The rebroadcast was seen by 1.5 million viewers.

Peter Pan Live! was included as part of 'The Shows Must Go On' series of musicals launched by Andrew Lloyd Webber on YouTube in response to Covid-19. It was originally intended to be available for 48 hours from June 5, 2020, however in response to the Black Lives Matter movement it was postponed until June 20, 2020.

=== Accolades ===
Award	Category	Nominee(s)	Result	Ref.
Art Directors Guild Awards	Awards or Event Special	Derek McLane	Nominated	
Directors Guild of America Awards	Outstanding Directorial Achievement in Movies for Television and Mini-Series	Kenny Leon and Matthew Diamond	Nominated	
Dorian Awards	Campy TV Show of the Year		Nominated	
Primetime Emmy Awards	Outstanding Music Direction	David Chase	Nominated	
Primetime Emmy Awards	Outstanding Production Design for Variety, Nonfiction, Reality or Reality-Competition Programming	Derek McLane, Aimee B. Dombo and Mike Pilipski	Nominated	
Primetime Emmy Awards	Outstanding Technical Direction, Camerawork, Video Control for a Limited Series, Movie or a Special	Eric Becker, Bob Muller, JC Castro, Senior Paul Ranieri, Senior Rob Balton, Robert Del Russo, Fred Frederick, Shaun Harkins, Charlie Huntley, Jay Kulick, Tore Livia, John Meiklejohn, Jimmy O'Donnell, Tim Quigley, Claus Stuhlweissenburg and Mark Whitman	Nominated	
Young Artist Awards	Best Performance in a TV Movie, Miniseries, Special or Pilot – Young Actor 13 and Under	John Alyn	Nominated	
Young Artist Awards	Best Performance in a TV Movie, Miniseries, Special or Pilot – Young Actor 13 and Under	Jake Lucas	Nominated	

=== Parodies ===
In 2014, in season 40 of Saturday Night Live, the cast parodied the special, with guest star James Franco as Captain Hook, Cecily Strong as Peter Pan, Kate McKinnon as Wendy, Aidy Bryant as Tonkerbell, Tinkerbell's half-sister who is part housefly and part fairy.

== Home media release ==
A DVD of the special was released on December 16, 2014, through Universal Studios Home Entertainment. The DVD includes the behind-the-scenes special, The Making of Peter Pan Live!.
