= Kevin Conroy =

American actor (1955–2022)

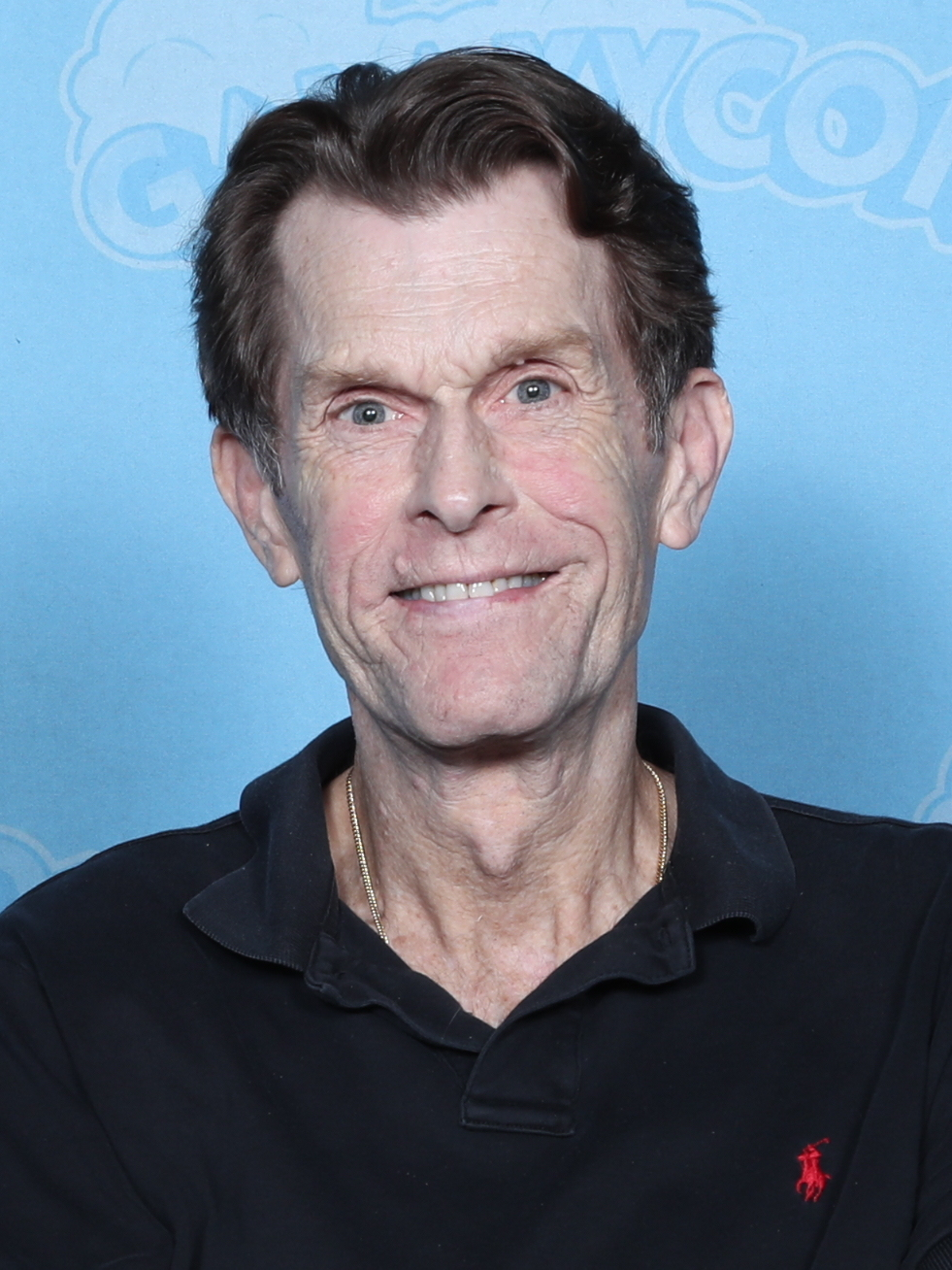
- Conroy in 2021
- Born: November 30, 1955; Westbury, New York, U.S.
- Died: November 10, 2022 (aged 66); New York City, U.S.
- Education: Juilliard School (BFA)
- Occupation: Actor
- Years active: 1978–2022
- Spouse: Vaughn C. Williams

Signature
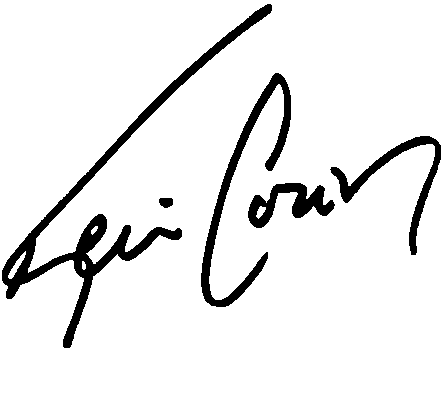

Kevin Conroy (November 30, 1955 – November 10, 2022) was an American actor. He appeared in a variety of stage performances, television series, and television films. Conroy earned fame for voicing the character Batman in various animated works, beginning with Batman: The Animated Series in 1992. Conroy went on to voice the character for dozens of animated television series, feature films, and video games over the next three decades.

== Early life ==
Kevin Conroy was born on November 30, 1955, in Westbury, New York, into an Irish Catholic family. He moved to Westport, Connecticut, when he was about 11 years old. He had three older siblings. Conroy held dual American and Irish citizenship.

Due to the tumultuous environment in his home, Conroy lived with a family friend during his last year of high school. His father was an alcoholic and once attempted suicide while Conroy was in high school. In adulthood, Conroy was estranged from his father for many years, but they reconciled shortly before his father's death. He was at both his mother's and father's side when they died.

Conroy moved to New York City in 1973 when he earned a full scholarship to attend the Juilliard School's drama division, studying under actor/director John Houseman. While there, he roomed with Robin Williams, who was in the same group as both Conroy and Kelsey Grammer. After graduating from Juilliard in 1978, he toured with Houseman's performing group The Acting Company, and the following year he went on the national tour of Ira Levin's Deathtrap. Conroy and his co-star Brian Bedford did not get along, and got into an on-stage brawl during the opening night performance of Deathtrap at the Kennedy Center.

== Career ==
=== Theatre ===
In 1980, after playing the role of Jerry Grove in the New York City-based daytime soap opera Another World, Conroy moved out to California to pursue further work in television. Conroy became associated with the Old Globe Theatre in San Diego, California, where he performed in productions of Hamlet and A Midsummer Night's Dream. From 1980 to 1985, he acted in a variety of contemporary and classic theatre pieces, including the Broadway productions of Edward Albee's adaptation of Lolita and Eastern Standard. He told The New York Times that, as a gay man living in New York City in the time of the AIDS epidemic, he "went to so many funerals that [he] felt such a sense of obligation" to portray the character of a TV producer secretly living with AIDS in Eastern Standard.

=== Film and television ===
Conroy returned to television in the 1985 TV film Covenant and had a role on another daytime soap drama, Search for Tomorrow. Conroy played gay lawyer Bart Fallmont on Dynasty from 1985 to 1986. He was a series regular on Ohara in 1987, and as the company commander on Tour of Duty from 1987 to 1988, before starring in a series of television films. Though initially cast as one of the show's main characters, his role on the show was reduced while it filmed in Hawaii and he ended up spending much of his time making portraits of tourists on the Honolulu boardwalk. Conroy also guest starred on shows such as Cheers, Search for Tomorrow, Matlock and Murphy Brown.

=== Voice acting ===
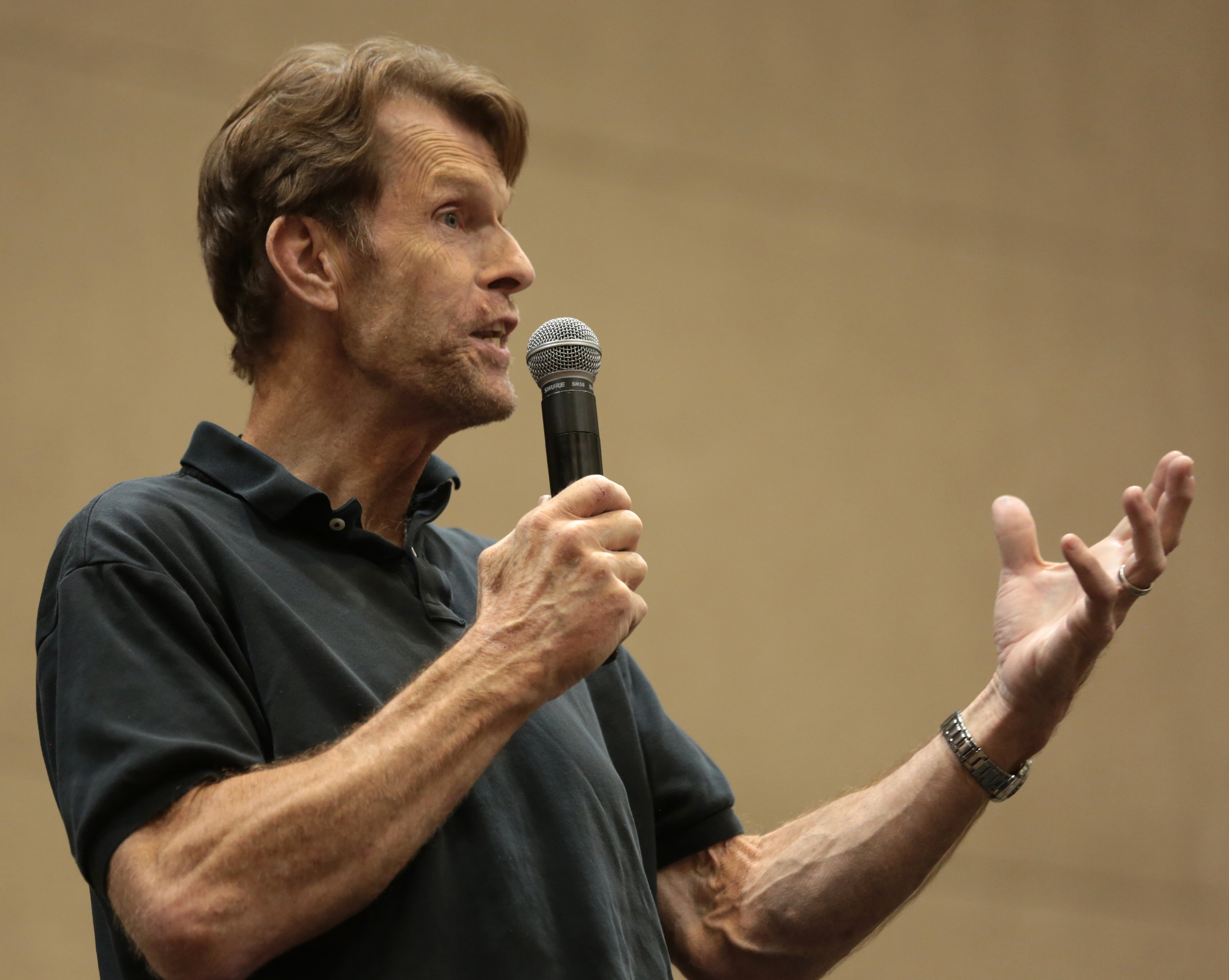
Conroy speaking at the 2017 Phoenix Comicon

As a voice actor, Conroy is known for his starring role in Batman: The Animated Series (1992–1995). He was notably the first voice actor to alter his voice tone between portraying Batman and Bruce Wayne, which Michael Keaton had previously done in Tim Burton's live-action Batman films. However, Conroy based his dual-voice performance on Leslie Howard in the 1934 film The Scarlet Pimpernel. He continued to voice Batman in various animated spin-off productions, which collectively took place in what is known as the DC Animated Universe (DCAU). These spin-offs include the TV shows The New Batman Adventures (1997–1999), Batman Beyond (1999–2001, in which he portrays an elderly Bruce Wayne retired from crimefighting), Justice League (2001–2004), and Justice League Unlimited (2004–2006), as well as the theatrical film Batman: Mask of the Phantasm (1993), and the direct-to-video films Batman & Mr. Freeze: SubZero (1998), Batman Beyond: Return of the Joker (2000), and Batman: Mystery of the Batwoman (2003). He also voiced the DCAU Batman for guest appearances in Superman: The Animated Series, Static Shock and The Zeta Project.

I often marveled at how appropriate it was that I should land this role. As a gay boy growing up in the 1950s and '60s in a devoutly Catholic family, I'd grown adept at concealing parts of myself. Of putting aspects of myself in a separate box and locking it away.

— Kevin Conroy, from his autobiographical comic Finding Batman

Conroy went on to voice Batman in the direct-to-video DC Universe Animated Original Movies: Batman: Gotham Knight (2008), Superman/Batman: Public Enemies (2009), Superman/Batman: Apocalypse (2010), Justice League: Doom (2012), Justice League: The Flashpoint Paradox (2013), Batman: Assault on Arkham (2014), Batman: The Killing Joke (2016), Batman and Harley Quinn (2017), and Justice League vs. the Fatal Five (2019). He later returned to voicing Batman on TV for the animated series Justice League Action (2016–2018), along with guest appearances on Teen Titans Go! and Scooby-Doo and Guess Who?. In a tally of the actor's performances that include his every episode and film portrayal of Batman, Conroy portrayed the character longer than any other actor in live-action and animation. The previous record-holder was Olan Soule, who voiced Batman in various animated works between the late 1960s and early 1980s (including Super Friends).

After the September 11, 2001, attacks in New York City, Conroy participated in relief efforts by volunteering to cook for people. During an audio commentary on Batman: Gotham Knight, Conroy expressed his surprise at the reaction of the emergency service workers to his presence. At the behest of another cook, Conroy called out from the kitchen to the dining area in his "Batman voice", reciting the iconic line, "I am vengeance! I am the night! I am Batman!" (from the BTAS episode "Nothing to Fear"). This was greeted by cheers and applause from emergency service personnel, many of whom had been fans of Batman: The Animated Series during its airing in the 1990s. Conroy confessed to being humbled and deeply flattered by the reaction.

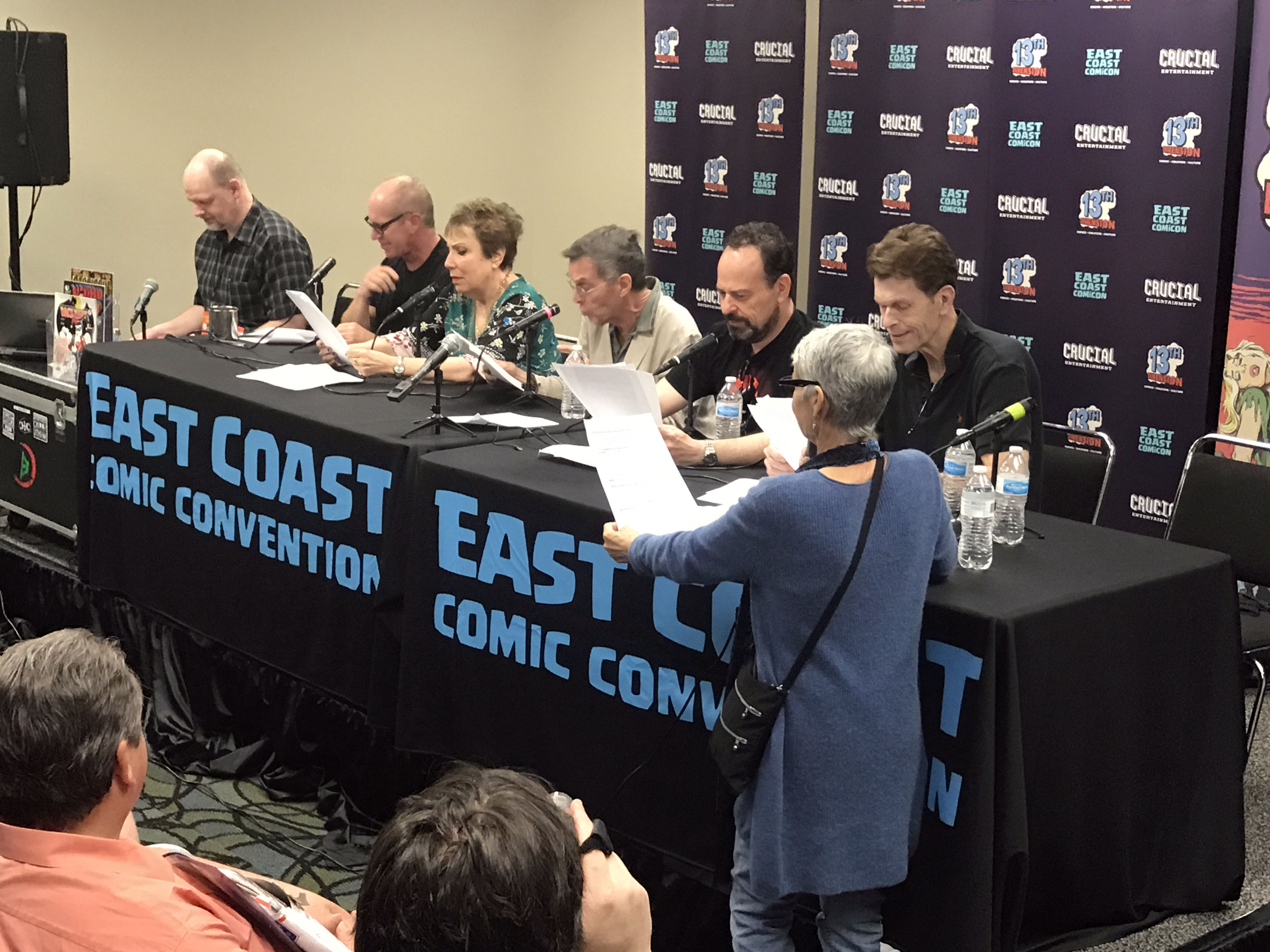
Conroy, at right, did a table read with the voice cast and crew of Batman: The Animated Series at the 2019 East Coast Comicon in Secaucus, New Jersey.

Conroy also voiced Batman for multiple video games, including the Batman: Arkham series. Following the release of Batman: Arkham Asylum (2009) and Batman: Arkham City (2011), he stated at the 2013 Dallas Comic Con that he had been working on "the next Arkham", leading to rampant speculation that he would reprise his role in Batman: Arkham Origins. In June 2013, however, it was confirmed that Conroy would not be involved in Arkham Origins (Batman was instead voiced by Roger Craig Smith in that game), meaning Conroy may have been referring to a yet-unannounced game from the Arkham series. He would ultimately reprise the role for the fourth game in the series, titled Batman: Arkham Knight (2015).

In October 2013, Conroy appeared on Tim Daly's web series The Daly Show, parodying his role as Batman, with Daly reprising the role of Superman from Superman: The Animated Series.

Conroy portrayed Bruce Wayne of Earth-99 in live-action in the Arrowverse crossover "Crisis on Infinite Earths". This was his only live-action portrayal of the character.

Mark Hamill, Conroy's frequent voice actor co-star as the Joker, spoke highly of working with him. Regarding his willingness to be involved in a Batman-related project, Hamill said, "When they offer me roles now, I say, 'Is Kevin doing it?' ... I don't even have to read the script, if Kevin's doing it, I'll do it." In 2023, following Conroy's death, Hamill stated he would no longer voice the Joker, citing his Joker quote "Without Batman, crime has no punchline".

In 2024, his final time voicing the character were in the spin-off title to the Arkham series, Suicide Squad: Kill the Justice League and a brief cameo in Justice League: Crisis on Infinite Earths – Part Three. The following year, Conroy was revealed to have a posthumous role in the Devil May Cry animated series as Vice President William Baines.

== Personal life ==
In a 2016 interview with The New York Times promoting the animated adaptation of Batman: The Killing Joke, Conroy revealed that he was gay. As part of DC Comics' 2022 Pride anthology, Conroy wrote "Finding Batman", a story that recounted his life and experiences as a gay man. It received critical acclaim upon release, and posthumously won Conroy the 2023 Eisner Award for Best Short Story.

He was married to Vaughn C. Williams at the time of his death.

Conroy made an effort to conceal his homosexuality throughout most of his career. He spoke in "Finding Batman" about the discrimination he faced once potential collaborators and employers discovered his homosexuality. Conroy said that on multiple occasions he had been removed from consideration for acting jobs due to his sexual orientation.

Conroy made frequent appearances at comic book conventions; his last convention was in Connecticut in July 2022.

== Death ==
Conroy died at Mount Sinai Hospital in New York City on November 10, 2022, at age 66, of intestinal cancer. Upon news of his death, DC Comics gave free online access to "Finding Batman" as a way to honor Conroy. "Finding Batman" went on to win the 2023 Eisner Award for Best Short Story. His co-stars, including Mark Hamill, Tim Daly, Tara Strong, and numerous other figures paid tribute to Conroy on social media.

== Legacy and tributes ==
Conroy was mourned by coworkers and fans worldwide, with even his friend Mark Hamill retiring his role as the Joker upon Conroy's death, citing his Joker quote "Without Batman, crime has no punchline". The first season finale of Devil May Cry, the video games Justice League: Cosmic Chaos, Suicide Squad: Kill the Justice League, Lego Batman: Legacy of the Dark Knight, and the film Justice League: Crisis on Infinite Earths – Part Three were all dedicated to Conroy's memory, particularly with Cosmic Chaos and Justice League: Crisis on Infinite Earths– Part Three being also dedicated to Gilbert Gottfried, Neal Adams, Alan Grant, George Pérez, and Tim Sale, all of whom also died in the same year.

== Filmography ==
=== Film ===
Year	Title	Role	Notes
1992	Chain of Desire	Joe	
1993	Batman: Mask of the Phantasm	Bruce Wayne / Batman	Voice
1998	Batman & Mr. Freeze: SubZero	Bruce Wayne / Batman	Voice, direct-to-video
2000	Batman Beyond: Return of the Joker	Bruce Wayne / Batman	Voice, direct-to-video
2003	Batman: Mystery of the Batwoman	Bruce Wayne / Batman	Voice, direct-to-video
2005	The Complete Robin Storyboard Sequence	Bruce Wayne / Batman	Voice, direct-to-video
2008	Batman: Gotham Knight	Bruce Wayne / Batman	Voice, direct-to-video
2009	Superman/Batman: Public Enemies	Bruce Wayne / Batman	Voice, direct-to-video
2010	Superman/Batman: Apocalypse	Bruce Wayne / Batman	Voice, direct-to-video
2012	Justice League: Doom	Bruce Wayne / Batman	Voice, direct-to-video
2013	Jay & Silent Bob's Super Groovy Cartoon Movie!	The Mayor of Red Bank	Voice
2013	Justice League: The Flashpoint Paradox	Bruce Wayne / Batman	Voice, direct-to-video
2013	Necessary Evil: Super-Villains of DC Comics	Himself	Documentary
2013	I Know That Voice	Himself	Documentary
2014	Russian Yeti: The Killer Lives	Narrator	Voice, documentary
2014	Alfred	Alfred	Short film
2014	Batman: Assault on Arkham	Bruce Wayne / Batman	Voice, direct-to-video
2015	Batman vs. Robin	Thomas Wayne	Voice, direct-to-video
2016	Batman: The Killing Joke	Bruce Wayne / Batman	Voice, limited theatrical release
2016	Yoga Hosers	Canadian Bat, Man!	
2017	Batman and Harley Quinn	Bruce Wayne / Batman	Voice, direct-to-video
2019	Justice League vs. the Fatal Five	Bruce Wayne / Batman	Voice, direct-to-video
2024	Justice League: Crisis on Infinite Earths – Part Three	Bruce Wayne / Batman (Earth 12)	Voice, direct-to-video; Posthumous release; dedicated in memory

=== Television ===
Year	Title	Role	Notes
1978	How to Pick Up Girls!	Bartender	Television film
1980	Another World	Jerry Grove	Recurring role
1982	Born Beautiful	Stan	Television film
1982	A Midsummer Night's Dream	Lysander	Television film
1983	A Fine Romance	Phil	Television film
1983	Kennedy	Ted Kennedy	Miniseries
1984	George Washington	John Laurens	1 episode
1984–1985	Search for Tomorrow	Chase Kendall	79 episodes
1985	Covenant	Stephen	Television film
1985–1986	Dynasty	Bart Fallmont	Recurring role; season 6
1986	Matlock	Clark Harrison	Episode: "The Affair"
1986	Kay O'Brien	David	Episode: "Princess of the City"
1986	Spenser: For Hire	Gallagher	Episode: "Shadowsight"
1987	Ohara	Captain Lloyd Hamilton	Main role; season 1
1987–1988	Tour of Duty	Captain Rusty Wallace	Recurring role; season 1
1988	Killer Instinct	Dr. Steven Nelson	Television film
1990	So Proudly We Hail	Francis Crosby	Television film
1990	The Face of Fear	Frank Dwight Bollinger	Television film
1990	WIOU	Lenny Lubinsky	Episode: "Pilot"
1989–1990	Cheers	Darryl Mead	2 episodes
1991	Murphy Brown	Roger Harris	Episode: "Terror on the 17th Floor"
1991	Hi Honey – I'm Dead	Brad Stadler	Television film
1992	Rachel Gunn, R.N.	Dr. David Dunkle	Main role
1992	The Secret Passion of Robert Clayton	Hunter Roy Evans	Television film
1992	Battle in the Erogenous Zone	Mondo Ray	Television short
1992–1995	Batman: The Animated Series	Bruce Wayne / Batman, additional voices	Main voice role
1994	Island City	Colonel Tom Valdoon	Television film
1994	The New Adventures of Captain Planet	Army Corps of Engineers Official	Voice, episode: "Jail House Flock"
1995	The Office	Steve Gilman	Main role
1996	The Real Adventures of Jonny Quest	Hardman	Voice, episode: "Manhattan Maneater"
1997–1999	The New Batman Adventures	Bruce Wayne / Batman	Main voice role
1997–1999	Superman: The Animated Series	Bruce Wayne / Batman	Voice, recurring role
1999–2001	Batman Beyond	Bruce Wayne / Batman, Stage Batman	Main voice role
2001	The Zeta Project	Bruce Wayne / Batman	Voice, episode: "Shadows"
2001–2004	Justice League	Bruce Wayne / Batman, additional voices	Voice, main role
2002–2004	Static Shock	Bruce Wayne / Batman	Voice, 5 episodes
2004–2006	Justice League Unlimited	Bruce Wayne / Batman, Joe Chill	Main voice role
2006	The Batman	John Grayson	Voice, episode: "A Matter of Family"
2008	Ben 10: Alien Force	Bellicus	Voice, episode: "X = Ben + 2"
2009, 2013	The Venture Bros.	Captain Sunshine	Voice, 2 episodes
2010	Batman: The Brave and the Bold	Batman of Zur-En-Arrh, Phantom Stranger	Voice, 2 episodes
2013	DC Nation Shorts: Tales of Metropolis	Bruce Wayne / Batman	Voice, episode: "Lois Lane"
2014	DC Nation Shorts: Batman Beyond	Bruce Wayne / Batman	Voice, television short
2014	DC Nation Shorts: Batman: Strange Days	Bruce Wayne / Batman	Voice, television short
2014	DC Nation Shorts: Shazam!	Zeus	Voice, episode: "Wisdom"
2015	Turbo Fast	Stinger	Voice, episode: "The Sting of Injustice"
2016–2018	Justice League Action	Bruce Wayne / Batman	Main voice role
2018	Teen Titans Go!	Bruce Wayne / Batman	Voice, episode: "Real Orangins"
2019	Scooby-Doo and Guess Who?	Bruce Wayne / Batman	Voice, episode: "What a Night, For a Dark Knight!"
2019	Welcome to the Wayne	Prismal	Voice, 7 episodes
2019	Batwoman	Bruce Wayne (Earth-99)	Episode: "Crisis on Infinite Earths: Part Two"; Final on-screen role
2019	Crisis Aftermath	Himself	Guest
2021	Masters of the Universe: Revelation	Mer-Man	Voice, episode: "The Most Dangerous Man in Eternia"
2022	He-Man and the Masters of the Universe	Hordak	Voice, episode: "The End of the Beginning (Part 2)"
2025	Devil May Cry	William Baines, various voices	Voice; posthumous release

=== Video games ===
Year	Title	Voice role	Notes
1994	The Adventures of Batman & Robin	Bruce Wayne / Batman	Sega CD version
1999	Crusaders of Might and Magic	Drake	
2001	Batman: Vengeance	Bruce Wayne / Batman	
2001	Jak and Daxter: The Precursor Legacy	Fisherman	
2003	Max Payne 2: The Fall of Max Payne	Lord Jack, Cleaner, Commando	
2003	Batman: Rise of Sin Tzu	Bruce Wayne / Batman	
2003	Lords of EverQuest	Lord Palasa	
2009	Batman: Arkham Asylum	Bruce Wayne / Batman, Thomas Wayne	
2011	DC Universe Online	Bruce Wayne / Batman	
2011	Batman: Arkham City	Bruce Wayne / Batman, Thomas Elliot / Hush	
2011	Batman: Arkham City Lockdown	Bruce Wayne / Batman	
2013	Injustice: Gods Among Us	Bruce Wayne / Batman	
2015	Infinite Crisis	Bruce Wayne / Batman	
2015	Batman: Arkham Knight	Bruce Wayne / Batman, Thomas Elliot / Hush	
2016	Batman: Arkham Underworld	Bruce Wayne / Batman	
2016	View-Master Batman Animated VR	Bruce Wayne / Batman	
2016	Batman: Arkham VR	Bruce Wayne / Batman, Thomas Wayne	
2017	Injustice 2	Bruce Wayne / Batman	
2018	Lego DC Super-Villains	Bruce Wayne / Batman	
2022	Hard West II	'Old Man' Bill	
2022	MultiVersus	Bruce Wayne / Batman	
2024	Suicide Squad: Kill the Justice League	Bruce Wayne / Batman	Posthumous release; dedicated in memory
2026	Lego Batman: Legacy of the Dark Knight	Arkham Asylum Announcer	Posthumous release; dedicated in memory

=== Theme parks ===
Year	Title	Role	Notes
2015	Justice League: Battle for Metropolis	Bruce Wayne / Batman	

=== Web ===
Year	Title	Role	Notes
TBA	Ollie & Scoops	The Creature (voice)	Posthumous release; final role

== Theatre ==
Year	Title	Role	Notes
1980	Hamlet	Performer	Old Globe Theatre
1981	Lolita	Performer	Broadway
1982	A Midsummer Night's Dream	Performer	Old Globe Theatre
1989	Eastern Standard	Peter Kidde	Broadway

== Awards and nominations ==
Year	Award	Category	Work	Result	Ref.
2001	Annie Award	Outstanding Individual Achievement for Voice Acting by a Male Performer in an Animated Television Production	Batman Beyond, "Out of the Past"	Nominated	
2012	Behind the Voice Actors Awards	Best Vocal Ensemble in a Video Game	Batman Arkham City	Won	
2013	Behind the Voice Actors Awards	Best Vocal Ensemble in a TV Special/Direct-to-DVD Title or Short	Justice League: Doom	Won	
2013	Behind the Voice Actors Awards	Best Male Vocal Performance in a TV Special/Direct-to-DVD Title or Short	Justice League: Doom	Won	
2014	Behind the Voice Actors Awards	Best Vocal Ensemble in a Video Game	Injustice: Gods Among Us	Won	
2015	Behind the Voice Actors Awards	Best Vocal Ensemble in a TV Special/Direct-to-DVD Title or Short	Batman: Assault on Arkham	Won	
2015	Play Legit's Best	Best Actor	Batman: Arkham Knight	Won	
2017	Behind the Voice Actors Awards	Best Vocal Ensemble in a TV Special/Direct-to-DVD Title or Short	Batman: The Killing Joke	Won	
2018	Behind the Voice Actors Awards	Best Vocal Ensemble in a Television Series	Justice League Action	Nominated	
2018	Behind the Voice Actors Awards	Best Vocal Ensemble in a TV Special/Direct-to-DVD Title or Short	Batman and Harley Quinn	Nominated	
2023	Eisner Awards	Eisner Award for Best Short Story	DC Pride, "Finding Batman"	Won	

Preceded by Adam West	Voice of Batman; 1992–2006	Succeeded by Rino Romano
Preceded by Jeremy Sisto	Voice of Batman; 2008–2022	Succeeded by Various Others (concurrent)
