= Scott Frankel =

American composer

Scott David Frankel (born May 6, 1963) is an American composer.

== Career ==
=== Early life ===
Frankel began his music education taking piano lessons with Betty Belkin in Cleveland, Ohio. He attended Interlochen Arts Camp, Hawken School (‘81) and graduated from Yale University in 1985, when he was inducted into the Skull and Bones secret society. While at Yale he met playwright Doug Wright.

=== Work ===
Frankel worked as a music director, conductor and pianist, on Broadway shows including Into the Woods, Les Misérables, Jerome Robbins' Broadway, Rags (1986, rehearsal pianist) and Falsettos, and also Off-Broadway on Putting It Together starring Julie Andrews.

He accompanied Shirley MacLaine and Meryl Streep in the film Postcards from the Edge party scene.

He then became a musical theatre composer, notably through collaborations with lyricist/librettist Michael Korie.

Their musical Doll was workshopped at the University of Houston as part of Stuart Ostrow's Musical Theatre Lab in 1995. A professional production premiered in Ravinia Festival in a staged reading in 2003, and was further developed at the Sundance Institute Theatre Lab, White Oak, Florida in December 2005.

Their musical Grey Gardens premiered Off-Broadway in 2006, and transferred to Broadway. For Grey Gardens, Frankel received a Tony Award nomination, as well as the ASCAP Richard Rodgers New Horizons Award and The Frederick Loewe Award for Dramatic Composition.

Their musical Happiness opened Off-Broadway in March 2009 Mitzi E. Newhouse Theater at Lincoln Center, with a book by John Weidman, direction and choreography by Susan Stroman.

In 2012, their musical Far from Heaven, starring Kelli O’Hara, premiered at the Williamstown Theatre Festival. The show, adapted from the film by Todd Haynes, subsequently received a production at Playwrights Horizons in 2013.

More recently, Frankel and Korie wrote the music and lyrics, respectively, for the musical War Paint, about Helena Rubinstein and Elizabeth Arden. The musical, with the book by Doug Wright and directed by Michael Greif, premiered at the Goodman Theatre, Chicago, in the summer of 2016 with stars Patti LuPone as Helena Rubinstein and Christine Ebersole as Elizabeth Arden. The musical is based on the 2003 book by Lindy Woodhead and on the 2007 documentary The Powder and the Glory by Ann Carol Grossman and Arnie Reisman. The production transferred to Broadway and opened on April 6, 2017.

== Personal life ==
Frankel currently resides in Manhattan. He and his partner, the architect Jim Joseph, restored Forth House in the Hudson Valley (New York).

== Awards ==
- MacDowell Fellowship, 1999, 2004, 2011
- ASCAP New Horizons Richard Rodgers Award
- Frederick Loewe Award

== Works ==
- Doll - 2003 - Lyrics/Libretto by Michael Korie
- Grey Gardens - 2006 - Lyrics by Michael Korie, Book by Doug Wright
- Happiness - 2009 - Lyrics by Michael Korie, Book by John Weidman
- Meet Mister Future - 2006 - Lyrics/Libretto by Michael Korie
- Far from Heaven - 2013 - Lyrics by Michael Korie; book by Richard Greenberg
- War Paint - 2016/2017 - Lyrics by Michael Korie, Book by Doug Wright
