= Richard Greenberg =

American playwright and television writer (1958–2025)

- Born: February 22, 1958; East Meadow, New York, U.S.
- Died: July 4, 2025 (aged 67); New York City, U.S.
- Education: Princeton University (BA); Harvard University (attended); Yale University (MFA)
- Occupations: Playwright; television writer
- Writing career
- Period: 1984–2022
- Notable works: Eastern Standard (1988); Three Days of Rain (1998); Take Me Out (2003)
- Notable awards: Tony Award for Best Play; New York Drama Critics Circle Award; Drama Desk Award; Finalist, Pulitzer Prize for Drama; Oppenheimer Award

Richard Greenberg (February 22, 1958 – July 4, 2025) was an American playwright and television writer known for his subversively humorous depictions of middle-class American life. He had more than 25 plays premiere on Broadway, off-Broadway, and off-off-Broadway in New York City and eight at the South Coast Repertory Theatre in Costa Mesa, California, including The Violet Hour, Everett Beekin, and Hurrah at Last. Greenberg is perhaps best known for his 2002 play Take Me Out.

== Early life and education ==
Greenberg was born on February 22, 1958, in East Meadow, New York, on Long Island. The younger of two children, his father, Leon Greenberg, was an executive for New York's Century Theaters movie chain, and his mother Shirley was a homemaker. Greenberg graduated from East Meadow High School in 1976 and went on to attend Princeton University, where he graduated magna cum laude with an A.B. in English. As part of his degree, Greenberg completed a 438-page senior thesis titled "A Romantic Career – A Novel". At Princeton, Greenberg studied creative writing under Joyce Carol Oates and roomed with future Harvard economics professor Greg Mankiw. Later, he attended Harvard for graduate work in English and American literature, but dropped out of the program when he was accepted to the Yale School of Drama's playwriting program in 1985.

== Career ==
Greenberg received the George Oppenheimer Award presented by Newsday in 1985 for The Bloodletters, produced off-off-Broadway while he was at Yale. In 1998, he was the first winner of the PEN/Laura Pels Theater Award for a playwright in mid-career.

Greenberg's play Take Me Out, about the conflicts that arise after a Major League Baseball player nonchalantly announces to the media that he is gay, premiered in 2002. The play premiered in London and ran in New York as the first collaboration between England's Donmar Warehouse and New York's Public Theater. After it transferred to Broadway in early 2003, Take Me Out won widespread critical acclaim for Greenberg and many prestigious awards including the Tony Award for Best Play.

Along with Take Me Out, Greenberg's plays include The Dazzle, The American Plan, Life Under Water, and The Author's Voice. His adaptation of August Strindberg's Dance of Death ran on Broadway in 2002, starring Ian McKellen, Helen Mirren, and David Strathairn.

In 2013, Greenberg worked on three shows: on Broadway, The Assembled Parties and an adaptation of Breakfast at Tiffany's, and the book for the musical Far From Heaven, which opened in June 2013 at Playwrights Horizons.

His play Our Mother's Brief Affair premiered at the South Coast Repertory Theatre in Costa Mesa in April 2009. Directed by Pam MacKinnon, the cast featured Jenny O'Hara, Matthew Arkin, Arye Gross and Marin Hinkle. This was a commission from the SCRT. The play opened on Broadway at the Samuel J. Friedman Theatre, produced by the Manhattan Theatre Club, on December 28, 2015 (previews), and officially on January 20, 2016, starring Linda Lavin.

His play The Babylon Line premiered off-Broadway at Lincoln Center Theater's Mitzi E. Newhouse Theater on November 10, 2016, in previews, and officially on December 5. Directed by Terry Kinney, the cast features Josh Radnor as a writing teacher and Elizabeth Reaser as his student. The play was first performed at New York Stage and Film & Vassar College's Powerhouse Theater in June and July 2014, starring Radnor.

=== Style ===
The Methuen Drama Guide to Contemporary American Playwrights describes Greenberg's "most prominent" interest as history "and (also) the past". He has a strong "tendency to draw on historical characters or events——the Lost Generation, the Collyer Brothers, the New York Yankees" as sources for his material. He is said to have a "witty use of language."

== Personal life and death ==
Greenberg lived in Chelsea, Manhattan.

Greenberg died from cancer at a nursing home in Manhattan, on July 4, 2025, at the age of 67; he previously had Hodgkin lymphoma when he was in his thirties. Actor Denis O'Hare paid tribute to him on Instagram, saying "He gave me the greatest gift ever – a beautiful character to inhabit in a beautiful play. He also gave me 2 of my best friends – Lisa Peterson and Linda Emond. We all met and worked on Rich's one act – The Author's Voice at Remains Theatre in 1987 in a festival of one acts called 'Sneaky Feelings.' I have a sneaky feeling of grief mixed with gratitude for this man." Actor Jesse Tyler Ferguson also paid tribute, writing "Rest in peace Richard, you gave the world so much." Theater director Robert Falls wrote "For over 30 years, it's been one of life's great pleasures to know Rich and his writing. Dazzling, humane, wildly funny. ... He was also one of the smartest people I've ever met. But he wore that brilliance lightly—often cloaked in hilarity, or tossed off in the driest, most devastating line at dinner. His kindness was real. His loss is enormous."

== Works ==
- 1984: The Bloodletters, Ensemble Studio Theatre, New York, NY, 1984.
- 1985: Life Under Water, Marathon '85 Series. Ensemble Studio Theatre, New York, NY, 1985.
- 1986: Vanishing Act, Marathon '86 Series. Ensemble Studio Theatre, New York, NY, 1986.
- 1987: The Author's Voice & Imagining Brad, Greenwich House, New York, NY, 1999.
- 1987: The Hunger Artist (based on stories and letters by Franz Kafka), St. Clement's, New York, NY
- 1987: The Maderati, Playwrights Horizons, February 19, 1987.
- 1988: Eastern Standard, Manhattan Theatre Club. New York City Center Stage I. October 1988; John Golden Theatre, Broadway, January 5, 1989.
- 1988: Neptune's Hips, Marathon '88 Series. Ensemble Studio Theatre, New York, NY, 1988.
- 1990: The American Plan, Manhattan Theatre Club. New York City Center-Stage I. December 4, 1990; Samuel J. Friedman Theatre, Broadway, 2009.
- 1992: The Extra Man, Manhattan Theatre Club. New York City Center-Stage II. April 28, 1992.
- 1992: Jenny Keeps Talking, Manhattan Theatre Club. New York City Center-Stage II, New York, NY. March 22, 1993.
- 1992: Pal Joey (based on the musical by John O'Hara, revised book), Huntington Theatre Company, Boston, MA, 1992–1993; Studio 54, Broadway, 2008
- 1994: Night And Her Stars, Manhattan Theatre Club. New York City Center-Stage II, March 29, 1995; South Coast Repertory, March 1994
- 1998: Three Days of Rain, Manhattan Theatre Club. New York City Center-Stage II, November 12, 1997; Bernard B. Jacobs Theatre, Broadway, 2006
- 1998: Hurrah at Last, Roundabout Theatre Company. Gramercy Theatre, New York, NY, June 3, 1999.
- 2000: Everett Beekin, South Coast Repertory, September 2000; Lincoln Center, Mitzi E. Newhouse Theater, November 14, 2001
- 2001: Dance of Death (adaptation), Broadhurst Theatre, Broadway
- 2002: The Dazzle, Gramercy Theatre, New York, NY, March 5, 2002.
- 2002: Take Me Out, Joseph Papp Public Theater, New York, NY, September 5, 2002; Walter Kerr Theatre, Broadway, 2003; Hayes Theater/Gerald Schoenfeld Theatre, Broadway, 2022
- 2003: The Violet Hour, Steppenwolf Theater Company, Chicago, IL, 2003; Biltmore Theatre, New York, NY, 2003.
- 2005: A Naked Girl on the Appian Way, South Coast Repertory Theater, Costa Mesa, CA; American Airlines Theatre, Broadway
- 2006: Bal Masque, Theatre J, Washington, D.C.
- 2006: The Well-Appointed Room, Steppenwolf Theater Company, Chicago
- 2006: The House in Town, Lincoln Center, Mitzi E. Newhouse Theater
- 2008: The Injured Party, South Coast Repertory Theater, Costa Mesa, CA.
- 2009: Our Mother's Brief Affair, South Coast Repertory Theater, Costa Mesa, CA; Samuel J. Friedman Theatre, Broadway, 2015
- 2013: Breakfast at Tiffany's, Cort Theatre, Broadway
- 2013: The Assembled Parties, Samuel J. Friedman Theatre, Broadway
- 2013: Far from Heaven (book), Playwrights Horizons, Off-Broadway
- 2016: The Babylon Line, Lincoln Center_{,} Off-Broadway
- 2020: The Perplexed, Manhattan Theatre Club, Off-Broadway
- 2021: A Shot Rang Out, South Coast Repertory Theater, Costa Mesa, CA.
- 2026: Holiday (adaptation), Goodman Theatre, Chicago, IL

=== Television ===
- 1989: "Ask Me Again" (based on "An Old-Fashioned Story" by Laurie Colwin), American Playhouse, PBS.
- 1989: "Life Under Water" (based on his one-act play), American Playhouse, PBS.
- 1989: "The Sad Professor," Trying Times, PBS.
- 1991: "Georgie Through the Looking Glass," Sisters, NBC.
- 1993: "Mirror, Mirror," Sisters, NBC.
- 1999: "The Time the Millennium Approached," Time of Your Life, Fox.

== Awards and nominations ==
- Tony Award, Best Play

Take Me Out, 2003 – winner
The Assembled Parties, 2013 – nominee

- New York Drama Critics Circle Award, Best American Play

Three Days of Rain, 1998 – Runner up
Take Me Out, 2003

- Drama Desk Award, Outstanding Play

Take Me Out, 2003 – winner
The Assembled Parties, 2013 – nominee

- Lucille Lortel Award, Outstanding Play

The Dazzle, 2002 – nominee
Take Me Out, 2003 – winner

- Drama League Award, Best Play, Take Me Out, 2003
- Outer Critics Circle Award

The Dazzle, 2002 Outstanding Off-Broadway Play – winner
The Dazzle, 2002 John Gassner Award – nominee

- Oppenheimer Award, Best New Playwright (The Bloodletters, 1985)
- Molly Kazan Playwriting Award
- PEN/Laura Pels Theater Award for an American Playwright in Mid-Career (1998)
- Pulitzer Prize for Drama

Three Days of Rain, 1998 – Finalist
Take Me Out, 2003 – Finalist

== See also ==
- LGBT culture in New York City
- List of LGBT people from New York City
