= Iron Jawed Angels =

2004 American historical drama film

- DVD cover
- Directed by: Katja von Garnier
- Written by: Sally Robinson; Eugenia Bostwick-Singer; Raymond Singer; Jennifer Friedes
- Produced by: James Bigwood; Laura McCorkindale; Denise Pinckley
- Starring: Hilary Swank; Frances O'Connor; Julia Ormond; Anjelica Huston
- Cinematography: Robbie Greenberg
- Edited by: Hans Funck
- Music by: Reinhold Heil; Johnny Klimek
- Production companies: HBO Films; Blue Dominion Productions; Bluebird House; Spring Creek Productions
- Distributed by: HBO Films
- Release dates: January 16, 2004 (Sundance); February 15, 2004 (United States)
- Running time: 125 minutes
- Country: United States
- Languages: English; Ukrainian

Iron Jawed Angels is a 2004 American historical drama film directed by Katja von Garnier. The film stars Hilary Swank as suffragist leader Alice Paul, Frances O'Connor as activist Lucy Burns, Julia Ormond as Inez Milholland, and Anjelica Huston as Carrie Chapman Catt. It received critical acclaim after the film premiered at the 2004 Sundance Film Festival.

The film focuses on the American women's suffrage movement during the 1910s and follows women's suffrage leaders Alice Paul and Lucy Burns as they use peaceful and effective nonviolent strategies, tactics, and dialogues to revolutionize the American feminist movement to grant women the right to vote. The film was released in the United States on February 15, 2004.

== Plot ==
Alice Paul and Lucy Burns return from England where they met while participating in the Women's Social and Political Union started by radical suffragette leader Emmeline Pankhurst and led by her daughter Christabel Pankhurst. The pair presents a plan to the National American Woman's Suffrage Association (NAWSA) to campaign directly in Washington D.C. for national voting rights for women. They find that their ideas are too forceful for the established suffragist leaders in the U.S., particularly Carrie Chapman Catt, but they are allowed to lead the NAWSA Congressional Committee in D.C. They start by organizing the 1913 Woman Suffrage Procession on the eve of President Woodrow Wilson's inauguration.

While soliciting donations at an art gallery, Paul convinces labor lawyer Inez Milholland to lead the parade on a white horse. Paul also meets a Washington newspaper political cartoonist, Ben Weissman (a fictional character), and there are hints of romantic overtones. In a fictional scene, Paul tries to explain to Ida B. Wells why she wants African American women to march in the back of the parade in order to not anger southern Democrats and activists, but Wells refuses, and she comes out of the crowd to join a white group during the middle of the parade. (Note: Wells did refuse to be segregated, and marched with her state delegation, but never met with Paul about it.) After disagreements over fundraising, Paul and Burns are forced out of the NAWSA, and they found the National Woman's Party (NWP) to support their approach. Alice Paul briefly explores a romantic relationship with Ben Weissman.

Further conflicts within the movement are portrayed as NAWSA leaders criticize NWP tactics, such as protesting against Wilson, and their sustained picketing outside of the White House in the Silent Sentinels action. Relations between the American government and the NWP protesters also intensify, as many women are arrested for their actions and charged with "obstructing traffic."

The arrested women are sent to the Occoquan Workhouse for 60-day terms. Despite abusive and terrorizing treatment, Paul and other women undertake a hunger strike, during which paid guards force-feed them milk and raw eggs. The suffragists are blocked from seeing visitors or lawyers, until (fictional) U.S. Senator Tom Leighton visits his wife Emily, one of the imprisoned women. News of their treatment leaks to the media after Emily secretly passes a letter to her husband during his visit. Paul, Burns, and the other women are released.

Pressure continues to be put on President Wilson as the NAWSA joins in the NWP call for passage of the Nineteenth Amendment to the United States Constitution. Wilson finally accedes to the pressure rather than be called out in the international press for fighting for democracy in Europe while denying democracy's benefits to half of the U.S. population. During the amendment's ratification, Harry T. Burn, a member of the Tennessee legislature, receives a telegram from his mother at the last minute, changes his vote, and the amendment passes.

== Origin of title ==
The film derives its title from Massachusetts Representative Joseph Walsh, who in 1917 opposed the creation of a committee to deal with women's suffrage. Walsh thought the creation of a committee would be yielding to "the nagging of iron-jawed angels" and referred to the Silent Sentinels as "bewildered, deluded creatures with short skirts and short hair." The use of iron holding open the jaws of the women being force-fed after the Silent Sentinel arrests and hunger strike is also a plot point in the film.

== Cast ==
- Hilary Swank as Alice Paul
- Frances O'Connor as Lucy Burns
- Julia Ormond as Inez Milholland
- Anjelica Huston as Carrie Chapman Catt
- Molly Parker as Emily Leighton
- Laura Fraser as Doris Stevens
- Lois Smith as Reverend Dr. Anna Howard Shaw
- Vera Farmiga as Ruza Wenclawska
- Brooke Smith as Mabel Vernon
- Patrick Dempsey as Ben Weissman
- Margo Martindale as Harriot Eaton Stanton Blatch
- Adilah Barnes as Ida Wells-Barnett
- Bob Gunton as President Woodrow Wilson
- Vinny Genna as Fiorello La Guardia
- Peter Berinato as Harry T. Burn
- Joseph Adams as Senator Thomas "Tom" Leighton
- Brett Boseman as Ben Weissman's Child

=== Fictional characters ===
The fictional characters in the film are Ben Weissman; his child; Emily Leighton; and Senator Tom Leighton.

== Reception ==
=== Critical response ===
Film critic Richard Roeper gave the film a positive review, writing, "Iron Jawed Angels is an important history lesson told in a fresh, and blazing fashion." Scott Faundas of Variety gave the film a negative review, writing, "HBO's starry suffragette drama, Iron Jawed Angels, latches on to a worthy historical subject and then hopes noble intentions will be enough to carry the day. Alas, there's no such luck in this talky, melodramatic overview of the dawn of equal rights for women in America. Gussied up with a comically anachronistic use of period music on the soundtrack and flashy, MTV-style montage sequences, pic misguidedly strives – but ultimately fails – to belie its instincts as an assembly-line movie-of-the-week."

Robert Pardi of TV Guide gave a mixed review, "All the elements for a splendid film about the early days of the women's rights are in place, but director Katja von Garnier's use of distracting cinematic trickery and jarringly modern music meshes poorly with the period setting... Blessed with a flawless physical production, von Garnier distorts her epic tale with music that belongs on a Lilith Fair tour; it sometimes feels as though she and her writers conceived the fight for women's suffrage as a 1912 version of Sex and the City. Only when the anachronisms finally subside in the film's final third is the moving core allowed to shine."

Historians have been critical about the movie for several reasons. Director Katja von Garnier created a 21st-century soundtrack and remade the early 20th-century suffragists into "third-wave" feminists that would be more familiar to modern audiences. The depiction of Alice Paul's sexuality in the film had no basis in historic fact; Paul was single-minded in her devotion to winning suffrage for women. There is no evidence she had a sexually intimate relationship with anyone, male or female. The movie even creates a fictional character to play a love interest for Paul, cartoonist Ben Weissman. This suggests that Paul needed the assistance of a newspaperman to get publicity for her activist campaign, when in reality, Paul was a highly talented publicist in her own right.

The film also portrayed Paul welcoming Ida B. Wells-Barnett with a smile when Wells-Barnett joined the procession from the mass of spectators along the route. This never happened in reality, and was perhaps the director's attempt to soften the event's racist aspect. Paul marched in the college section in her cap and gown, not with the Illinois delegation that Wells-Barnett joined. Wells-Barnett marched with two white Illinois women who had supported her right to march with the state delegation: Belle Squire and Virginia Brooks.

=== Accolades ===
The film was nominated for five awards at 56th Primetime Emmy Awards, none of which were won; three awards at the 62nd Golden Globe Awards, winning one; and two awards at the 9th Golden Satellite Awards, winning one. Anjelica Huston won the Golden Globe Award for Best Supporting Actress – Series, Miniseries or Television Film and the Satellite Award for Best Supporting Actress – Series, Miniseries or Television Film for her performance in the film.

Year	Award	Category	Recipient	Result
2004	Primetime Emmy Award	Outstanding Casting for a Miniseries, Movie, or a Special	Janet Hirshenson, Jane Jenkins, Liz Marks, Kathleen Chopin	Nominated
2004	Primetime Emmy Award	Outstanding Cinematography for a Miniseries or a Movie	Robbie Greenberg	Nominated
2004	Primetime Emmy Award	Outstanding Costumes for a Miniseries, Movie, or a Special	Caroline Harris, Eric Van Wagoner, Carl Curnutte III	Nominated
2004	Primetime Emmy Award	Outstanding Supporting Actress in a Miniseries or a Movie	Anjelica Huston	Nominated
2004	Primetime Emmy Award	Outstanding Writing for a Miniseries, Movie, or a Dramatic Special	Sally Robinson, Eugenia Bostwick-Singer, Raymond Singer, Jennifer Friedes	Nominated
2004	Casting Society of America	Best Casting for TV Movie of the Week	Janet Hirshenson, Jane Jenkins, Liz Marks	Nominated
2004	Humanitas Prize	90 Minute or Longer Category	Sally Robinson, Eugenia Bostwick-Singer, Raymond Singer, Jennifer Friedes	Nominated
2004	OFTA Television Awards	Best Supporting Actress in a Motion Picture or Miniseries	Anjelica Huston	Nominated
2004	OFTA Television Awards	Best Supporting Actress in a Motion Picture or Miniseries	Brooke Smith	Nominated
2004	OFTA Television Awards	Best Actress in a Motion Picture or Miniseries	Hilary Swank	Nominated
2004	OFTA Television Awards	Best Motion Picture Made for Television	Iron Jawed Angels	Nominated
2005	Golden Globe Awards	Best Supporting Actress – Series, Miniseries or Television Film	Anjelica Huston	Won
2005	Golden Globe Awards	Best Miniseries or Television Film	Iron Jawed Angels	Nominated
2005	Golden Globe Awards	Best Actress – Miniseries or Television Film	Hilary Swank	Nominated
2005	American Society of Cinematographers	Outstanding Achievement in Cinematography in Movies of the Week/Mini-Series/Pilot (Basic or Pay)	Robbie Greenberg	Won
2005	Screen Actors Guild Awards	Outstanding Performance by a Female Actor in a Miniseries or Television Movie	Hilary Swank	Nominated
2005	Satellite Awards	Best Supporting Actress – Series, Miniseries or Television Film	Anjelica Huston	Won
2005	Satellite Awards	Best Miniseries or Television Film	Iron Jawed Angels	Nominated
2005	PEN Center USA West Literary Awards	Teleplay	Sally Robinson, Eugenia Bostwick-Singer, Raymond Singer, Jennifer Friedes	Won
2005	Costume Designers Guild Award	Outstanding Period/Fantasy Television Series	Caroline Harris	Nominated

== See also ==
- Jailed for Freedom (1920 book)
- Shoulder to Shoulder (1974 series)
- Suffragette (2015 film)
- Suffs (2022 musical)
