= Ruza Wenclawska =

American trade union organizer and suffragist (1889-1934)

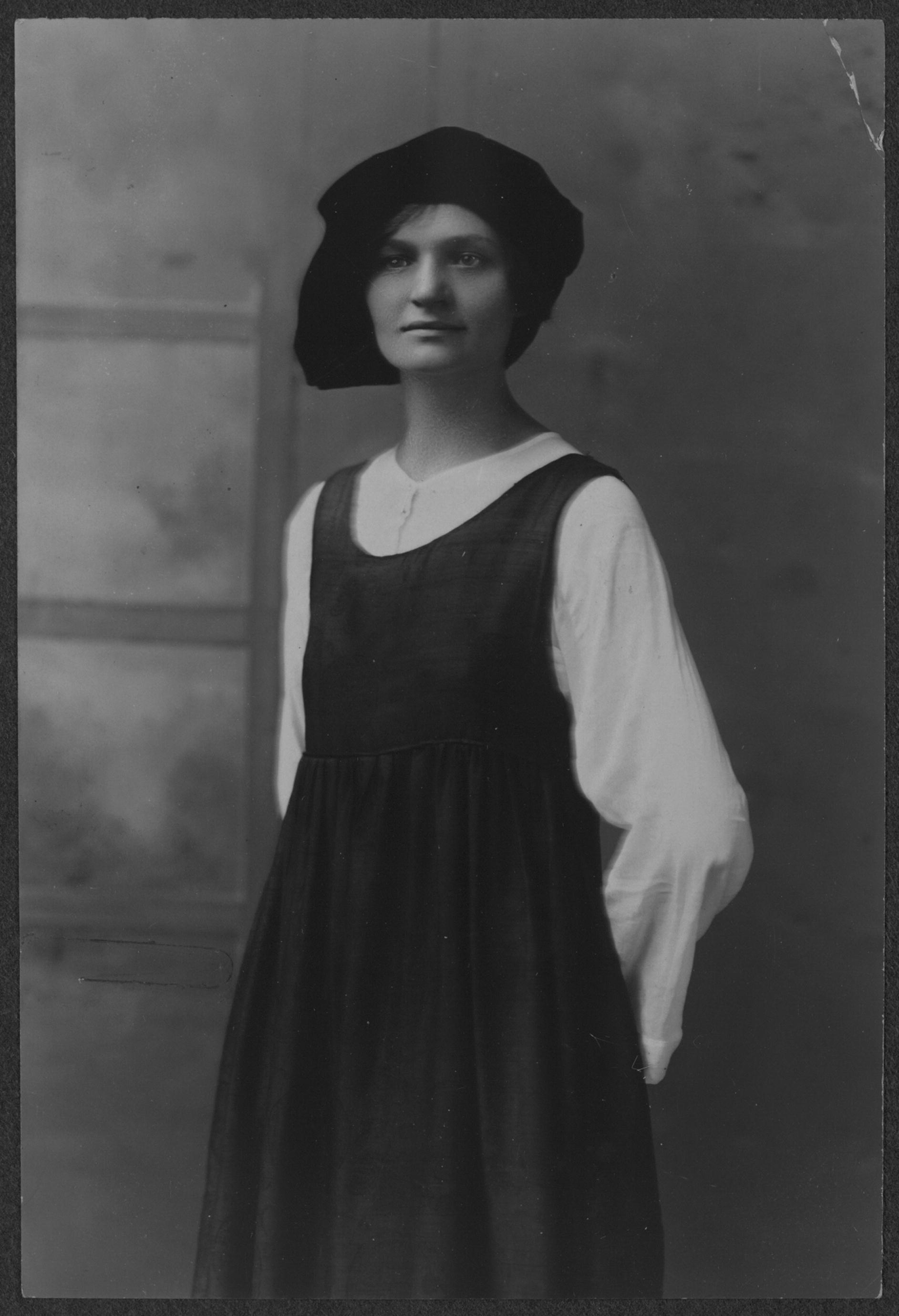
- Wenclawska in New York City, c.1916
- Born: Ruza Wenclawska; December 15, 1889; Suwałki, Poland
- Died: April 16, 1934 (aged 44); Islip, NY, United States
- Other names: Rose Winslow; Rose Lyons; Ruza Wenclaw
- Occupations: Suffragist; Factory worker; Trade union organizer; Actress; Poet
- Spouse: Philip Lyons

Ruza Wenclawska (December 15, 1889 – April 16, 1934), more widely known as Rose Winslow and later as Rose Lyons by marriage, was a Polish-American suffragist, factory inspector and trade union organizer. She was a dedicated member of the National Woman's Party. Wenclawska's main goal within this organization was to advocate fair treatment in the workplace for women. She also worked as an actress and a poet.

== Early life ==
Wenclawska was born in Suwałki, Congress Poland, and immigrated to the United States with her parents when she was an infant. At the age of eleven, she began work as a mill girl in the hosiery industry in Pittsburgh. Her father was a miner and her brother a slate picker. Wenclawska also worked in factories in Philadelphia. When she was nineteen, she caught tuberculosis, and was unable to work for two years. During this time, Wenclawska put herself through night school, and began working as a labor organizer.

== Later life ==
Wenclawska worked as a factory inspector and a trade union organizer in New York City with the National Consumers' League and the National Women's Trade Union League. She also worked with the Woman's/Women's Political Union by 1913 before joining the National Woman's Party. Wenclawska became an excellent public speaker during her years of union activism and would travel across the country speaking to suffrage rallies, often with National Woman's Party founder Alice Paul. However, Wenclawska would advocate for the inclusion of working-class women and men into the National Woman's Party while Paul did not wish to organize men and did not encourage a pro-labor message in her platform. In February 1914, Wenclawska and Doris Stevens spoke at a mass meeting for working women and organized a mass suffrage parade in which working women marched to the White House to meet with Woodrow Wilson on suffrage rights. Also in 1914, Wenclawska and Lucy Burns were leaders of the Congressional Union for Woman Suffrage's campaign in California to urge voters to oppose Democratic congressional candidates (see House and Senate election results). She did similar work with other organizers in Wyoming during the electoral campaigns of 1916. During this time, she also wrote a poem, "The 'New Freedom' for Women," that was published in The Suffragist. There she compared Wilson unfavorably to Abraham Lincoln, who sacrificed his life to give freedom to slaves. Wilson, in contrast, told suffrage advocates, "You can afford to wait."

In September and October 1916, Wenclawska went out west as a speaker for the National Woman's Party to lobby for the federal woman suffrage amendment and oppose Democratic candidates. She spoke mostly in Colorado and Arizona. She got very ill during those speaking engagements, and had to make only one speech per day, and rest a lot.

In 1917, she was part of the Silent Sentinels protests at the White House. On October 15, 1917, Wenclawska was arrested, sentenced to seven months in jail, and was sent to the Occoquan Workhouse in Virginia. Once in jail, Wenclawska and her fellow picketers were threatened, assaulted, and abused. Wenclawska, herself, was placed in solitary confinement for at least five weeks. These abuses resulted in a hunger strike, a symbolic protest that forced the authorities to either release them or torture them by force-feeding. This demonstration also intended to identify the picketers as political rather than criminal prisoners. During this time, Wenclawska smuggled letters out to her husband, Philip Lyons, and her friends. In one of these letters she writes, "I am waiting to see what happens when the President realizes that brutal bullying isn’t quite a statesmanlike method for settling a demand for justice at home...All the officers here know we are making this hunger strike that women fighting for liberty may be considered political prisoners; we have told them. God knows we don’t want other women ever to have to do this over again." Eventually all of the women were released and courts ruled that the arrests had been improper. Following more than two years of White House picketing, Congress approved the 19th Amendment and sent it out to the states for ratification, which followed in August 1920. Her engagement in political activism appears to have ended with her White House picketing and subsequent jail time.

Wenclawska married Phil Lyons before 1910. By 1917, they were living in Greenwich Village where they lived until the mid 1920s according to letters, and the 1920 census. She listed herself as an actress and performed in several plays in New York City, including a part in Eugene O'Neill's Desire Under the Elms, on Broadway in 1924. She performed under her maiden name, Ruza Wenclawska. Wenclawska and Lyons divorced in 1926. The 1930 United States census lists her as living at the Central Islip State Hospital in New York; she was a tuberculosis ward patient. She is listed in the New York State Death Index as having died on April 16, 1934, in Islip, NY.

== Theatre ==
Wenclawska started acting professionally in Redemption or The Living Corpse in October 1918. The play opened at the Plymouth Theater on Broadway, now the Schoenfeld Theater. It was produced by Arthur Hopkins, and John Barrymore played the lead role. Wenclawska played "a maid" and was credited as Ruza Wenclaw. In December 1918, she started performing with The Provincetown Players in Greenwich Village, under the name Ruza Wenclaw. She was Kate in The Rescue. She then played the role of 0555 in 5050 by Robert Allerton Parker in January 1919. In April 1919, she appeared as Annie in The Rope by Eugene O'Neill.

After a few years in Europe, Wenclawska went back to New York, and started working at the Provincetown Playhouse again, this time as Ruza Wenclawska. In January 1924, she appeared in the Playhouse's production of The Spook Sonata (The Ghost Sonata). She played the Janitress. She then played Prudence in Fashion by Anna Cora Mowatt. The play was produced at the Provincetown Playhouse from February to April 1924. It then moved to the Greenwich Village Theatre until July 1924. It moved to the Cort Theater, now James Earl Jones Theater on Broadway in July 1924. Fashion closed on July 1924. Wenclawska was a singer in S.S. Glencairn by O'Neill at the Provincetown Playhouse in November 1924. Desire Under the Elms by O'Neill opened at the Greenwich Village in November 1924. Ruza Wenclawska was "other folks from surrounding farms". It played there until January 1925. It then transferred to the Earl Carroll Theatre on Broadway. It played there until June 1925. The production then transferred to the George M. Cohan's Theatre until September 1925. It seems that Wenclawska left in July 1925 as an article from the New York Herald announced her return in Paris.

== Legacy ==
Doris Stevens published excerpts of Wenclawska's smuggled diary scraps from her time spent in the Occoquan Workhouse in Jailed for Freedom (1920), a history of militant suffragists in the United States between 1913 and 1919.

Wenclawska was portrayed by Vera Farmiga in the 2004 film Iron Jawed Angels, dramatized as a broad composite of working-class women discovering activism through the suffrage movement.

The 2017 book Feminist Essays by Nancy Quinn Collins was dedicated to Wenclawska.

Wenclawska is depicted in the musical Suffs, a role originated off-Broadway by Hannah Cruz in 2022, and on Broadway by Kim Blanck in 2024.
