= Inez Milholland =

American suffragist (1886–1916)

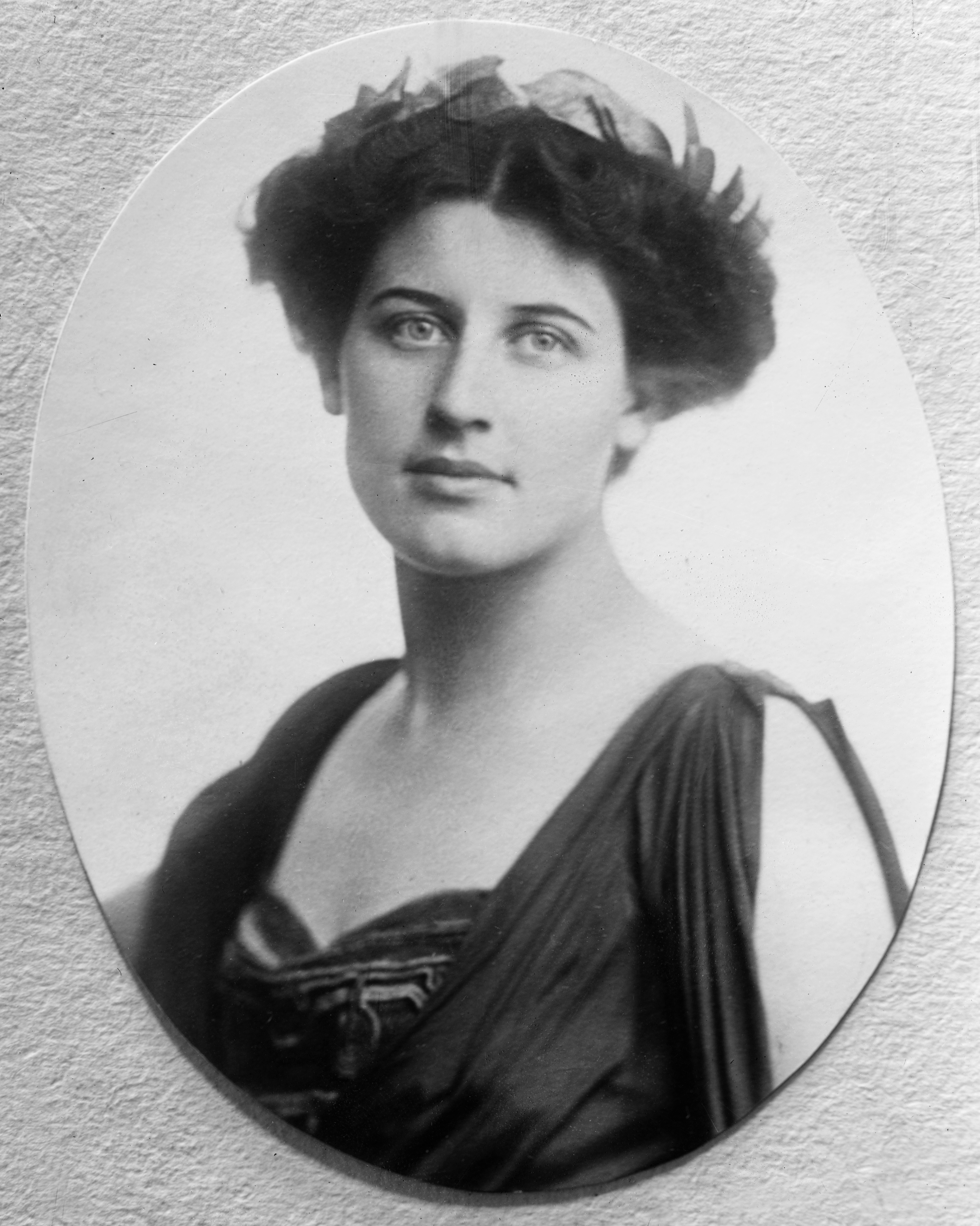
- Born: August 6, 1886; New York City, U.S.
- Died: November 25, 1916 (aged 30); Los Angeles, California, U.S.
- Education: Vassar College, NYU School of Law
- Spouse: Eugen Jan Boissevain (m. 1913–1916)

Inez Milholland Boissevain (August 6, 1886 – November 25, 1916) was a leading American suffragist, lawyer, and peace activist.

From her college days at Vassar College, she campaigned aggressively for women’s rights as the principal issue of a wide-ranging socialist agenda. In 1913, she led the dramatic Woman Suffrage Procession on horseback in advance of President Woodrow Wilson's inauguration as a symbolic herald. She was also a labor lawyer and a war correspondent, as well as a high-profile New Woman of the age, with her avant-garde lifestyle and belief in free love. She died of pernicious anemia on a speaking tour, traveling against medical advice.

== Early life ==
Born and raised in Brooklyn, New York, Inez Milholland grew up in a wealthy family. Known as Nan, she was the eldest daughter of John Elmer Milholland and Jean Milholland (née Torry). She had one sister, Vida, and one brother, John (Jack). Her father was a New York Tribune reporter and editorial writer who eventually headed a pneumatic tubes business that afforded his family a privileged life in both New York and London. In London, she met and was impressed by the English suffragist Emmeline Pankhurst. Milholland’s father supported many reforms, including world peace, civil rights, and women's suffrage. Her mother exposed her children to cultural and intellectual stimulation. Milholland spent summers on her family's land in Lewis, Essex County, New York; the property is now the Meadowmount School of Music.

== Education ==
Inez Milholland received her early education at the Comstock School in New York and Kensington Secondary School in London. After finishing school, she decided to attend Vassar, but when the college wouldn't accept her graduation certificate, she attended Willard School for Girls in Berlin.

As a student, she was known as an active radical. During her attendance at Vassar College, she was once suspended for organizing a women's rights meeting. The president of Vassar had forbidden suffrage meetings, but Milholland and others held regular "classes" on the issue, along with large protests and petitions. Defying the campus suffrage meeting ban, she convened one in a cemetery across the road. She started the suffrage movement at Vassar, enrolled two-thirds of the students, and taught them the principles of socialism. Milholland was president of the campus Intercollegiate Socialist Society, which was dominated by women at the time and reflected their identification with the oppressed. For Milholland, socialism was "a vital means to correct the monster evils under the sun."

With the radical group she had gathered about her, she attended socialist meetings in Poughkeepsie, which were under the ban of the faculty. An athletic young woman, she was the captain of the hockey team and a member of the 1909 track team; she also set a record in the basketball throw. Milholland was also involved in student productions, the Current Topics Club, the German Club, and the debating team.

After graduating from Vassar in 1909, she tried for admission at Yale University, Harvard University, and Cambridge University with the purpose of studying law, but was denied due to her sex. Milholland finally matriculated at the New York University School of Law, from which she took her LL.B. degree in 1912.

== Careers ==
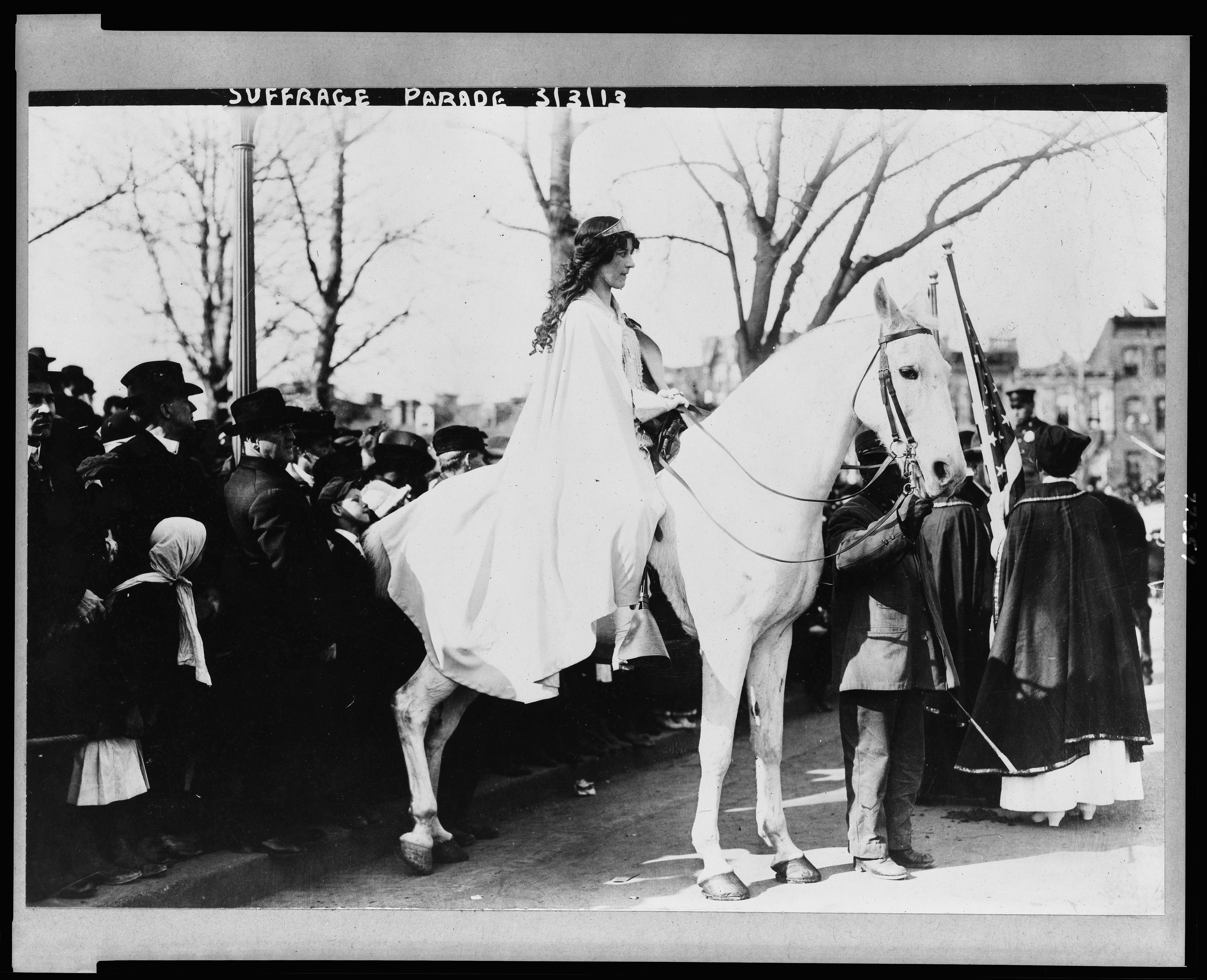
Inez Milholland, on horseback, led the March 3, 1913 Woman Suffrage Procession in Washington, D.C. She was known as the 'Most Beautiful Suffragist'.

Milholland's causes were far-reaching. She was not only interested in prison reform, but also sought world peace and worked for equality for African Americans. Milholland was a member of the NAACP, the Women's Trade Union League, the Equality League of Self Supporting Women in New York (Women's Political Union), the National Child Labor Committee, and England's Fabian Society. She was also involved in the National American Woman Suffrage Association, which later branched into the grassroots radical National Woman's Party. She became a leader and a popular speaker on the campaign circuit of the NWP, working closely with Alice Paul and Lucy Burns.

=== Lawyer ===
Milholland was later admitted to the bar and joined the New York law firm of Osborne, Lamb, and Garvan, handling criminal and divorce cases. In one of her first assignments, she was sent to investigate conditions at Sing Sing prison. At the time, female contact with male prisoners was frowned upon, but she insisted on talking personally with the prisoners to uncover the horrible conditions. Additionally, she wanted to see what it felt like to be an inmate, so she had herself handcuffed to one.

=== Suffrage ===
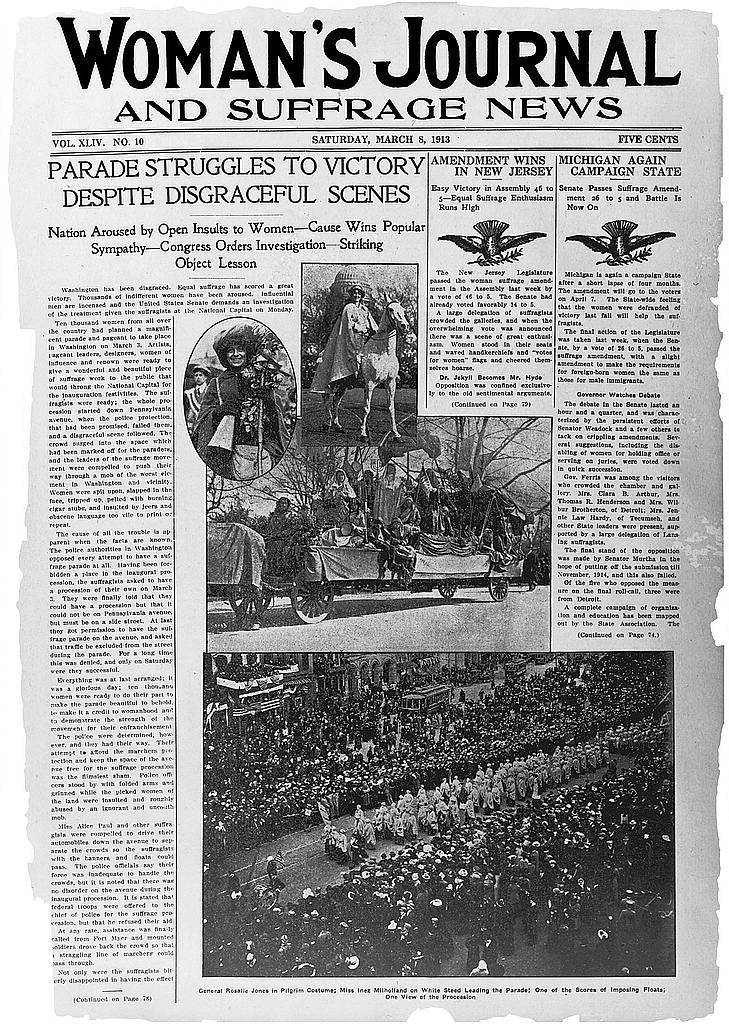
Front page of the Woman's Journal and Suffrage News from March 8, 1913. Depicted are Rosalie Gardiner Jones, Inez Milholland on a white horse, floats, and an aerial view of the Woman Suffrage Parade of 1913.

Milholland stepped into her first suffrage parade on May 7, 1911. She held a sign that read, "Forward, out of error,/Leave behind the night,/Forward through the darkness,/Forward into light!" Milholland quickly became the face of the suffrage movement. The New York Sun stated that "No suffrage parade was complete without Inez Milholland." Suffrage leader Harriot Eaton Stanton Blatch had Inez lead parades in 1911, 1912, and 1913. On March 3, 1913, the day before President Woodrow Wilson's inauguration, Milholland, 26, made her most well-known appearance at the Woman Suffrage Procession in Washington, D.C., which she had helped organize. Suffrage leader Alice Paul placed her at the head of the parade wearing a crown and a long white cape riding a large white horse named "Gray Dawn." Horses became a very common method of spreading information about the suffrage movement, and other suffragists such as Claiborne Catlin Elliman rode horses to raise awareness for the movement.

Milholland believed that women should have the right to vote because of the traits that were unique to women. She argued that women would metaphorically become the "house cleaners of the nation." She believed women's votes could remove social ills such as sweatshops, tenements, prostitution, hunger, poverty, and child mortality. She told men that they should not worry about the women in their lives, as they were extending their sacred rights and duties to the whole country rather than inside the home. Even though she spoke of these issues, she was always disappointed that she was better known for her looks than her brains.

The concluding words of her last suffrage speech were, “Mr. President, how long must women wait for liberty?"

=== Pacifist ===
Milholland traveled overseas to Italy at the beginning of World War I shortly after the RMS Lusitania had been torpedoed by a German U-boat. After landing, the captain informed Milholland that a German submarine followed them across the ocean. With this information, she began writing for the Tribune and became a war correspondent. Milholland worked to be allowed to visit the front lines in the war as she continued to write anti-war articles that led to her censure by the Italian government, which banned her from the country.

Upon returning from Italy, Milholland suffered from bouts of depression. She felt that she had been barred from the front because she was a woman and not because she was a pacifist. She felt like she had returned a failure.

She was also a leading figure on Henry Ford's ill-fated Peace Ship expedition of late 1915, steaming across the Atlantic with a team of pacifist campaigners who hoped to give impetus to a negotiated settlement to the First World War. However, she left the ship in Stockholm because the trip was unorganized and dissension had ensued between passengers.

== Personal life ==
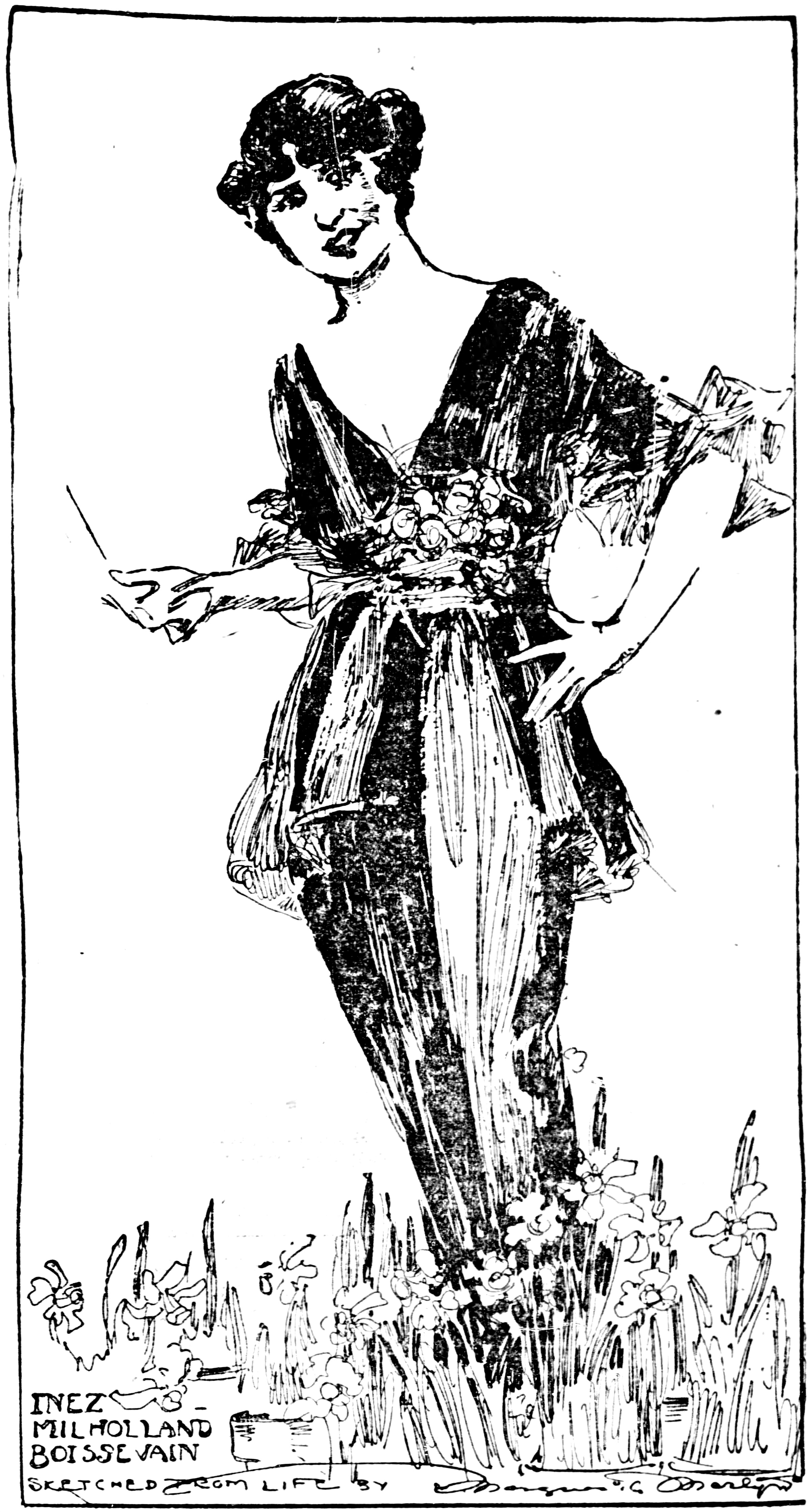
Sketched by Marguerite Martyn of the St. Louis Post-Dispatch, 1914

Inez Milholland became the classic New Woman in the beginning of the 20th century. She loved the new dance crazes of the Turkey Trot and the Grizzly Bear and enjoyed traveling to Paris and buying Parisian couture gowns. Additionally, her views mirrored those of the New Woman when it came to sexual love.

By the fall of 1909, Inez Milholland and Max Eastman became rising radical stars due to their handsome looks. Inez knew Max through his sister, Crystal Eastman, whom she met at socialist and suffrage rallies. Inez told Max that she loved him and tried to convince him to elope with her. When he finally reciprocated her love and agreed to marry her, their relationship fell apart. They both realized they could not be lovers, but they did remain close lifelong friends.

In the same way that she fell fast in love with Eastman, soon after she began seeing the author John Fox, Jr.. She told him she loved him, but he didn't reciprocate right away. When he did tell her that he loved her, she was no longer interested.

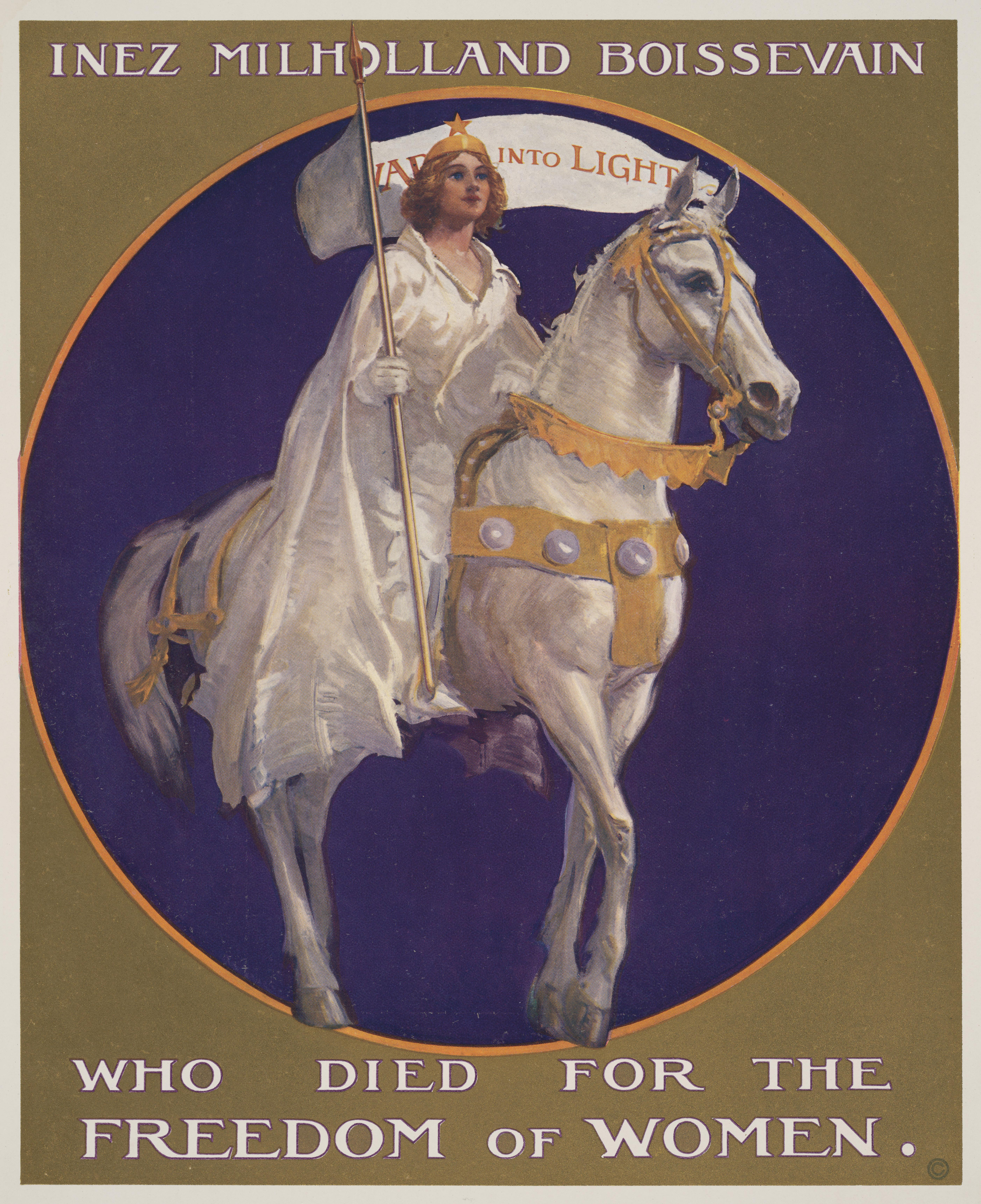
Suffrage poster depicting Milholland Boissevain dressed for the 1913 Woman Suffrage Procession in Washington, D.C.

In July 1913, while on a cruise to London, Milholland proposed to Eugen Jan Boissevain, a Dutchman she had known for about a month. The two were married on July 14 at the Kensington registry office, which was as soon as they could after they arrived in London without consulting their families. John Milholland was in New York at the time and heard about the marriage from the press. John insisted that the two get remarried in a church, but Inez refused. A complication arose when the couple returned to New York from London. Milholland was no longer an American citizen because the Expatriation Act of 1907 provided that if an American woman married a non-American, she took her husband's nationality.

Milholland did not stop flirting with other men after her marriage and often wrote to Boissevain to tell him. Although Milholland adored children, the couple never had any of their own.

== Death ==
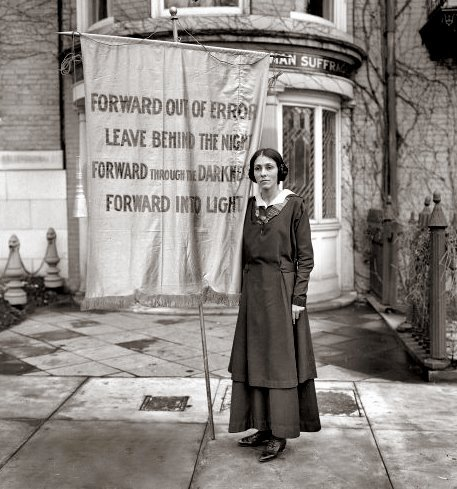
Banner at Milholland's memorial service in 1916

In 1916, she went on a tour in the West, speaking for women's rights as a member of the National Woman's Party. She undertook the tour despite suffering from pernicious anemia and despite the admonitions of her family, who were concerned about her deteriorating health. On October 23, 1916, she collapsed in the middle of a speech in Los Angeles, California, at Blanchard Hall and was rushed to Good Samaritan Hospital. Despite repeated blood transfusions, she died on November 25, 1916.

== Legacy ==
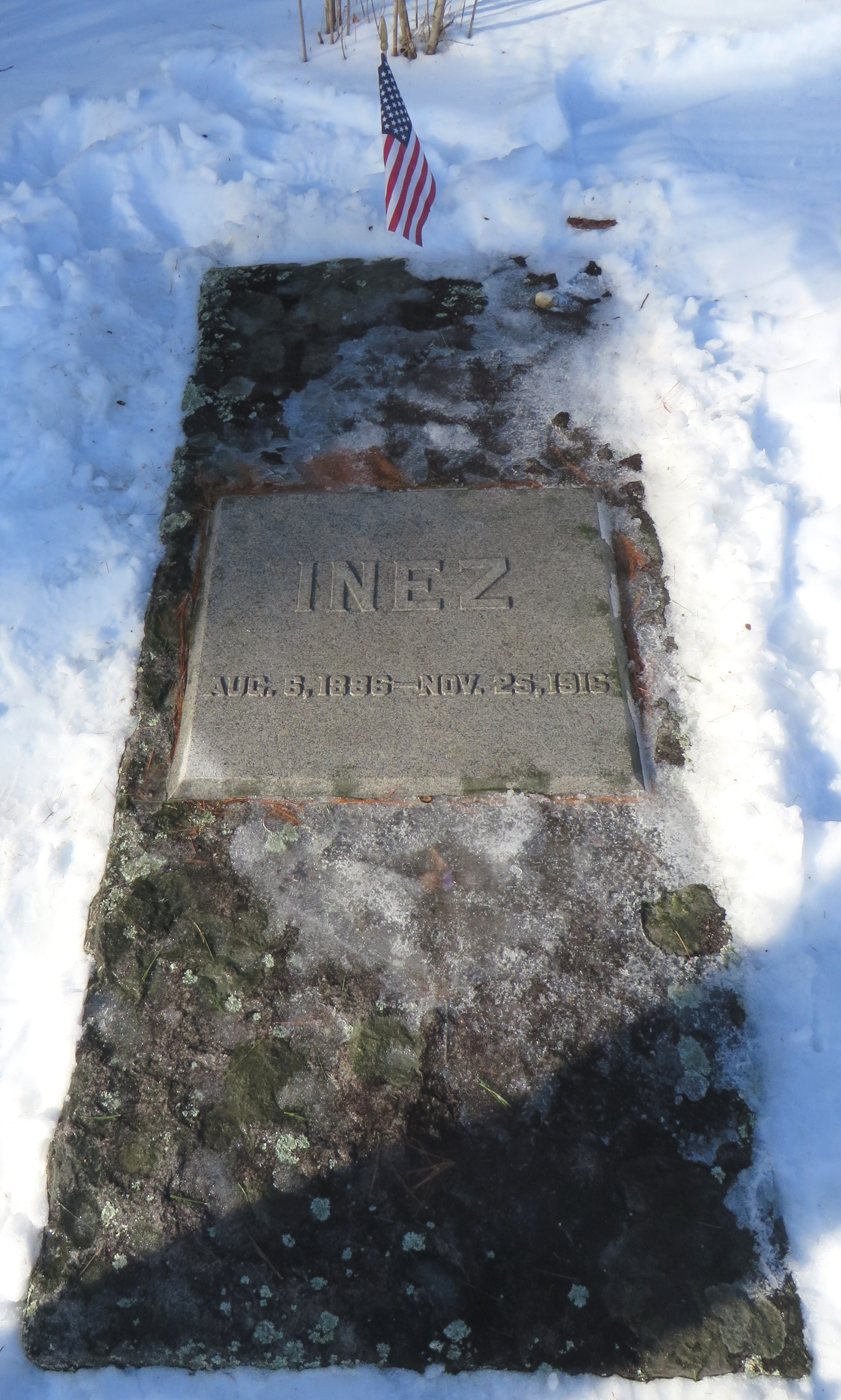
Inez Milholland's gravesite in the Lewis Cemetery, Lewis, New York, 2018

After she died, her sister Vida Milholland devoted her time to suffrage work, including going to prison for three days in 1917.

In 1916, Mount Discovery in the Adirondacks was renamed Mount Inez by the Town of Lewis in tribute to Inez Milholland. On December 12, 2019, the U.S. Board on Geographic Names approved the name change on the federal level.

Carl Sandburg wrote a poem about Inez Milholland titled "Repetitions," which appears in his 1918 volume, Cornhuskers. Edna St. Vincent Millay, who married Milholland's widower Eugen Boissevain in 1923, wrote a poem, "To Inez Milholland," included in her 1928 collection The Buck in the Snow.

Julia Ormond portrayed Inez Milholland in the 2004 film Iron Jawed Angels. Phillipa Soo portrayed Inez Milholland in the 2022 Off-Broadway musical Suffs. Upon the production's Broadway transfer, Hannah Cruz took over the role of Milholland.

The Inez Milholland Professorship of Civil Liberties at New York University School of Law, filled by Burt Neuborne, was named in her honor.

== See also ==
- History of feminism
- List of suffragists and suffragettes
- List of women's rights activists
- Suffragette
- Timeline of women's suffrage
- Women's Social and Political Union
- Women's suffrage in the United States
