= Utomi =

Utomi is a surname. Notable people with the surname include:

- Daniel Utomi (born 1997), American-born Nigerian basketball player
- Edred Utomi (born 1991), American stage actor
- Patrick Utomi (born 1956), Nigerian professor
- Chris Utomi Nwabuoku, Nigerian entrepreneur
