= Hannah Cruz =

American actress and singer (born 1992)

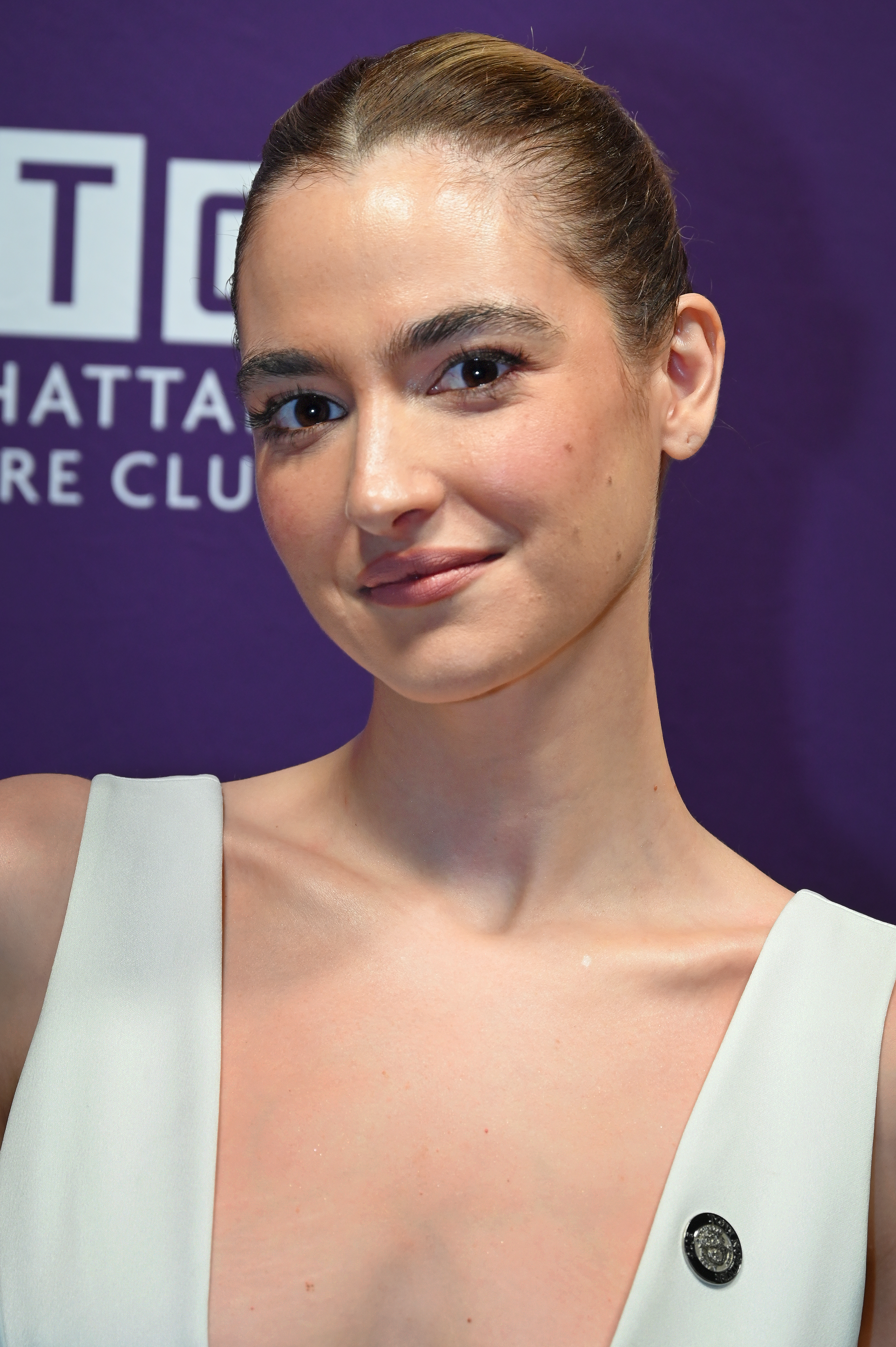
- Cruz in 2026
- Born: Hannah Rose DeFlumeri; February 19, 1992 (age 34)
- Occupations: Actress; singer
- Years active: 2011–present
- Spouse: Edred Utomi (m. 2024)

Hannah Cruz (born February 19, 1992) is an American actress and singer. She is known for playing Inez Milholland in the original Broadway cast of Suffs, as well as roles in the original cast of The Connector and the 2025 Broadway revival cast of Chess for which she was nominated for a Tony Award.

She was awarded the Clarence Derwent Award (2024) for promising performers from Actor's Equity, for her roles in Suffs and The Connector.

Cruz has also acted in television and film, including The Housemaid (2025) and The Copenhagen Test (2026). She was cast as Gussie in the upcoming film version of Merrily We Roll Along, which will be in production for more than a decade.

== Early life ==
Cruz was born Hannah Rose DeFlumeri to Jack and Jackie DeFlumeri. She grew up in Newtown, Connecticut. Cruz graduated from Newtown High School in 2010. She attended Broadway musicals as a teen, including the 2008 Gypsy revival starring Patti LuPone, who she has cited as a major inspiration. Cruz was accepted to Ithaca College, but chose to develop her acting career instead.

In 2010, she uploaded a performance as Mama Rose in her senior musical Gypsy to YouTube. It was shared at the time by Playbill as a viral video that received ten thousand views in less than a month. The video earned her an audition for a national non-Equity tour of Legally Blonde as Vivienne Kensington. After the tour, she moved to New York in 2011 to continue working as a professional actor.

== Career ==
After touring with Legally Blonde, Cruz continued to work in regional, touring, and off-Broadway theater throughout the 2010s. She acted in the 2015 national tour of Bullets over Broadway as Ellen. She played Elsa in the stage show Frozen – Live at the Hyperion at Disney California Adventure. Besides her theater work, Cruz also worked in food service and as a sitter.

Cruz joined the Hamilton national tour as Eliza in September 2018. She starred alongside Isa Briones (Peggy) and Stephanie Umoh (Angelica), as well as Edred Utomi. In 2020, she was cast as James Wilson in Diane Paulus's all-female revival of 1776 at the American Repertory Theater, which was postponed during the COVID-19 pandemic. She later acted at the Ogunquit Playhouse in Maine, including in stage versions of The Da Vinci Code and Young Frankenstein.

She featured as Ruza Wenclawska in the original production of Suffs at the Public Theater in 2022. New York Times critic Maya Phillips referred to Cruz's performance as "droll." She also appeared as Camille in Only Gold, a dance musical by Andy Blankenbuehler and Kate Nash, at the off-Broadway MCC Theater. A critic at New York Stage Review praised her performance, noting that "Hannah Cruz (a Suffs standout) somehow manages to surf this sea of cliches, with a fine voice and vivid presence."

Cruz originated the role of Robin Martinez—a junior copy editor suspicious of the Stephen Glass-inspired lead character—in the premiere of Jason Robert Brown's The Connector in February 2024. Though praising her performance overall, one review by Frank Scheck faulted her and lead Ben Levi Ross for poor vocal projection. In her own review, Roma Torre described Cruz's "lovely" performance as "the conscience of the story."

She returned to Suffs for the 2024 Broadway transfer as Inez Milholland, described as "the best-developed character" in the off-Broadway version when originated by Philippa Soo. Director Leigh Silverman had requested Cruz shift to the Milholland role during a pre-transfer workshop, to test her viability as Soo's replacement. The role marked Cruz's Broadway debut. She performed with the show until its closing on January 5, 2025. Cruz also features in the Great Performances recording of Suffs, set to air on PBS in May 2026. Cruz received the Clarence Derwent Award in 2024, for her breakthrough appearances in both The Connector and Suffs.

Cruz joined the Broadway revival of Chess in 2025. She performed the role of Svetlana Sergievsky, the abandoned Soviet wife of an expatriated chess grandmaster played by Nicholas Christopher. To promote the production, Cruz ran the backstage vlog "Don't Svet It," reflecting on the production's opening. For her role, Cruz received mixed, generally positive reviews. In Variety, critic Christian Lewis wrote that "the usually lovely Hannah Cruz as Svetlana (Anatoly's wife) in a rare misstep. Despite using a Russian accent in her dialogue, she makes no attempt to sing with it, a confounding and distracting choice." Alternatively, Chris Jones noted in the New York Daily News that "all of the performances are bravissimo or bravissima and there's an especially impressive turn here from Hannah Cruz,[...] she gives her character such a vocal and dramatic shove that Chess actually becomes a love quartet, which is the first time I ever have thought that." In her New York Times review, Elizabeth Vincentelli called Cruz's performance "enticingly cryptic."

=== Television and film ===
Cruz was cast in the multi-decade film project Merrily We Roll Along in 2025. The film is directed by Richard Linklater and stars Ben Platt (Charley), Beanie Feldstein (Mary), and Paul Mescal (Frank). She is set to play Gussie Carnegie, a Broadway star who marries Mescal's character. Linklater will film the movie over more than a decade, similar to his film Boyhood, to allow the cast to age as the movie proceeds through time. As of March 2026, Linklater plans to continue filming until at least 2039, with the progress currently at "a quarter of the way through" the chronology. Jonathan Marc Sherman, who wrote the book for The Connector and co-adapted the screenplay for Merrily, invited Cruz to the production. Cruz was a recurring character in the Peacock series The Copenhagen Test in 2026. She played Rachel Kasperian, the ex-fiancée of Simu Liu's protagonist. She also appeared in The Housemaid (2025).

== Personal life ==
Cruz has been married to Edred Utomi since 2024. They met during the Hamilton national tour, where they played the married couple, Elizabeth Schuyler Hamilton and Alexander Hamilton, onstage. In 2026, both Cruz and Utomi starred in Broadway shows at the same time. Their two theaters (the Imperial and the Richard Rodgers, respectively) are connected by a tunnel, which Lin-Manuel Miranda revealed to the couple. During one Hamilton performance, Miranda and Cruz used the tunnel to surprise Utomi.

== Work ==
Key
†	Denotes films that have not yet been released

=== Theater ===
Year	Title	Role	Venue	Ref
2018-2019	Hamilton	Eliza Hamilton	National tour	
2021	Young Frankenstein	Inga	Ogunquit Playhouse (Maine)	
2022	Suffs	Ruza Wenclawska	The Public Theater (off-Broadway)	
2022	Only Gold	Camille	MCC Theater (off-Broadway)	
2023	The Da Vinci Code	Sophie Neveu	Ogunquit Playhouse (Maine)	
2024	The Connector	Robin Martinez	MCC Theater (off-Broadway)	
2024-2025	Suffs	Inez Milholland	Music Box Theatre (Broadway)	
2025-2026	Chess	Svetlana Sergievsky	Imperial Theatre (Broadway)	
2026-2027	Little Shop of Horrors	Audrey	Westside Theatre (off-Broadway)	

=== Film ===
Year	Title	Role	Notes	Ref.
2025	The Housemaid	Lexi		
TBA	Merrily We Roll Along †	Gussie Carnegie	Filming until at least 2039	

=== Television ===
Year	Title	Role	Notes	Ref.
2026	The Copenhagen Test	Dr. Rachel Kasperian		
2026	Suffs	Inez Milholland	Recording of Broadway performance in Great Performances series	

== Awards and nominations ==
Year	Award	Category	Work	Result	Ref.
2024	Outer Critics Circle Awards	Outstanding Featured Performer in an Off-Broadway Musical	The Connector	Nominated	
2026	Tony Award	Best Featured Actress in a Musical	Chess	Nominated	
