= The Connector (musical) =

2023 stage musical by Jason Robert Brown

- World Premiere Production Poster
- Music: Jason Robert Brown
- Lyrics: Jason Robert Brown
- Book: Jonathan Marc Sherman; Story by Daisy Prince
- Productions: 2023 Off-Broadway

The Connector is a stage musical with music and lyrics by Jason Robert Brown and a book by Jonathan Marc Sherman, from an original story by Daisy Prince. Set in the 1990s world of New York City journalism, the plot follows behind-the-scenes drama amongst staff of the fictional magazine The Connector, examining themes of journalistic integrity, gender inequality and plagiarism.

== Synopsis ==
Robin Martinez appears on stage and tells the audience that the story they're about to hear first appeared in 1997 in the final issue of the acclaimed magazine, The Connector.

In 1995, at the office of The Connector, The aging editor-in-chief, Conrad O'Brien, toasts the assembled writers and editors, the new corporate owners (a German media corporation), and the past, present, and future of the magazine ("The Whole World Changed").

Later, Ethan Dobson, a talented and ambitious young writer, arrives at the office for a meeting, where he meets Robin, a 30-year-old copy editor. Robin has tried and failed to get Conrad interested in her writing, so she's fascinated by Ethan's boldness and casual manner, and the two of them begin to form a friendship. Conrad, too, is charmed and impressed by Ethan and gives him a job ("See Yourself"). As Ethan makes his way through the offices, connecting with every staff member, Robin observes him with jealousy and bemusement ("I'm Watching You").

Ethan's first article, a story about his encounter with the Scrabble Prodigy, Waldo Pine, gains popularity ("Success"). Robin and Ethan celebrate in a nearby bar and voice their displeasure with where they came from ("So I Came To New York").

Conrad encourages Ethan to push harder on the next story and refrain from writing in his comfort zone. Several months go by, with Ethan delivering story after story with great acclaim. When Conrad is interviewed on Booknotes with Brian Lamb, Ethan imagines himself on TV ("Voice Of My Generation"). Among Ethan's new fans is Mona Bland, a devoted reader and nitpicker known for writing fact-checking letters that come to Muriel, the senior fact-checker and longest-serving staff member, committed to upholding the magazine's integrity.

Robin shares with Ethan her growing frustration that Conrad disregards her writing. Ethan tries to defend Conrad, but Robin knows the only voices that will be heard in writing belong to people who look and sound like Conrad and Ethan ("Cassandra"). Ethan's newest story is a political exposé about Willis Taylor, a man who has a copy of a videotape of the Mayor of Jersey City smoking crack with a teenager ("Wind In My Sails"). It's legally risky for the magazine to publish, especially since Ethan's sources are seemingly impossible to confirm. Muriel advises against publishing, but Conrad overrules her. The article sends out shock waves, and the Mayor resigns.

Conrad, his faith in Ethan rewarded, confides to Zachary, the magazine's attorney, that he sees retirement soon, knowing someone soon will replace him ("Now What"). Mona finds many inconsistencies in Ethan's story and writes her monthly letter to Muriel. Robin leaves The Connector to join the far less prestigious New York Press staff. Ethan is taken aback by her decision to trade The Connector for a free publication. Offended by his reaction, Robin cuts ties with Ethan. Ethan then begins piecing together his next story ("Help Me Forget Everything").

At Mona's urging, Muriel uncovers evidence suggesting that Ethan may have entirely fabricated his story of the Jersey City Mayor. After explaining her passion for fact-checking, Muriel collects her findings and shares them with Robin ("Proof"). Ethan spots Robin and the editor of The New York Press entering a meeting with Conrad, sending him into a panic. He narrates his final, unpublished article for The Connector ("The Western Wall"). Conrad, Zachary and Robin interrogate Ethan to find verifiable information in his stories. Ethan, his panic growing more and more, begins to unravel until it becomes clear the entirety of his work is a lie. At the discovery of Ethan's falseness, Conrad begins drafting his resignation, hoping, in vain, that the magazine can be saved. Ethan, disgraced and alone, tries to defend himself. He tears up his notebooks and papers in frustration. Robin holds up a copy of The Connector's final issue and glances back at him. As he sweeps the shredded paper off his desk, the scene transforms into a whirlwind of loose magazine pages falling to the floor ("There Never Was").

== Production history ==
=== Off-Broadway (2024) ===
The musical had its world premiere at the MCC Theater Off-Broadway in 2024, after having been in development for nearly a decade. The show is directed by Daisy Prince with choreography by Karla Puno Garcia. The show began previews on January 12, 2024 and opened on February 6, 2024 and closed on March 17, 2024.

== Original cast and characters ==
Character	Off-Broadway
Character	2024
Conrad O'Brien	Scott Bakula
Ethan Dobson	Ben Levi Ross
Robin Martinez	Hannah Cruz (Note: Cruz departed the production on March 3 and was replaced by Ashley Perez Flanagan.)
Muriel	Jessica Molaskey
Waldo Pine	Max Crumm
Mona Bland	Mylinda Hull
Florencia Moreno	Joanna Carpenter
Sheryl Hughes	Danielle Lee Greaves
Brian Lamb	Michael Winther
Zachary Fleischer	Daniel Jenkins
Robert Henshaw / Willis Taylor	Fergie Philippe
Veronica Kraus-Ifrah	Ann Sanders
Nestor Fineman	Eliseo Roman

== Musical numbers ==
An original cast recording was released on June 21, 2024, featuring the original Off-Broadway cast.

- "The Whole World Changed" - Ethan Dobson, Robin Martinez, Conrad O'Brien, and Ensemble
- "See Yourself" - Ethan Dobson and Ensemble
- "I'm Watching You" - Robin Martinez
- "Success" - Ethan Dobson, Waldo Pine, and Ensemble
- "So I Came To New York" - Robin Martinez and Ethan Dobson
- "The Voice Of My Generation" - Ethan Dobson, Conrad O'Brien, and Ensemble
- "Cassandra" - Robin Martinez
- "Wind In My Sails" - Ethan Dobson, Willis Taylor, and Ensemble
- "Now What" - Conrad O'Brien
- "Help Me Forget Everything" - Ethan Dobson, Robin Martinez, Conrad O'Brien, and Ensemble
- "Proof" - Muriel and Ensemble
- "The Western Wall" - Ethan Dobson and Ensemble
- "There Never Was" - Ethan Dobson, Robin Martinez, and Ensemble

== Awards and nominations ==
Year	Award	Category	Work	Result	Ref.
2024	Outer Critics Circle Awards	Outstanding New Off-Broadway Musical		Nominated	
2024	Outer Critics Circle Awards	Outstanding Lead Performer in an Off-Broadway Musical	Ben Levi Ross	Nominated	
2024	Outer Critics Circle Awards	Outstanding Featured Performer in an Off-Broadway Musical	Hannah Cruz	Nominated	
2024	Outer Critics Circle Awards	Outstanding Featured Performer in an Off-Broadway Musical	Jessica Molaskey	Nominated	
2024	Outer Critics Circle Awards	Outstanding Book of a Musical	Jonathan Marc Sherman	Nominated	
2024	Outer Critics Circle Awards	Outstanding New Score	Jason Robert Brown	Nominated	
2024	Outer Critics Circle Awards	Outstanding Direction of a Musical	Daisy Prince	Nominated	
2024	Lucille Lortel Award	Outstanding Featured Performer in a Musical	Jessica Molaskey	Nominated	
2024	Lucille Lortel Award	Outstanding Projection Design	Jeanette Oi-Suk Yew	Nominated	
2024	Drama Desk Award	Outstanding Musical		Nominated	
2024	Drama Desk Award	Outstanding Lead Performance in a Musical	Ben Levi Ross	Nominated	
2024	Drama Desk Award	Outstanding Direction of a Musical	Daisy Prince	Nominated	
2024	Drama Desk Award	Outstanding Music	Jason Robert Brown	Nominated	
2024	Drama Desk Award	Outstanding Lyrics	Jason Robert Brown	Nominated	
2024	Drama Desk Award	Outstanding Costume Design of a Musical	Márion Talán de la Rosa	Nominated	
2024	Drama Desk Award	Outstanding Lighting Design of a Musical	Jeanette Oi-Suk Yew	Nominated	
2024	Drama Desk Award	Outstanding Projection and Video Design	Jeanette Oi-Suk Yew	Nominated	
