= Merrily We Roll Along (film) =

Upcoming film by Richard Linklater

- Directed by: Richard Linklater
- Screenplay by: Richard Linklater; Jonathan Marc Sherman
- Based on: Merrily We Roll Along by; Stephen Sondheim; George Furth; Merrily We Roll Along by; George S. Kaufman; Moss Hart
- Produced by: Jason Blum; Richard Linklater; Jonathan Marc Sherman; Mike Blizzard; Jenni Wieland
- Starring: Paul Mescal; Ben Platt; Beanie Feldstein; Mallory Bechtel; Lin-Manuel Miranda
- Edited by: Sandra Adair
- Music by: Stephen Sondheim
- Production companies: Blumhouse Productions; Detour Filmproduction
- Distributed by: Universal Pictures
- Country: United States
- Language: English

Merrily We Roll Along is an upcoming American epic musical film co-written and directed by Richard Linklater, based on the 1981 musical by Stephen Sondheim and George Furth, which is in turn adapted from the 1934 play by George S. Kaufman and Moss Hart. Jason Blum serves as a producer under his Blumhouse Productions banner. The film is set to star Paul Mescal, Ben Platt, and Beanie Feldstein.

The production began principal photography in 2019 with Blake Jenner as Franklin Shepard. Mescal replaced Jenner between 2021-2022, and reshot an unknown amount of footage from 2019.

== Premise ==
Talented Broadway composer Franklin Shepard abandons his friends and career to become a Hollywood producer, told over the course of two decades in reverse chronological order.

== Cast ==
- Paul Mescal as Franklin Shepard
- Ben Platt as Charley Kringas
- Beanie Feldstein as Mary Flynn
- Mallory Bechtel as Beth Spencer
- Hannah Cruz as Gussie Carnegie
- Lin-Manuel Miranda

== Production ==
On August 29, 2019, Blumhouse Productions acquired the rights to make a Merrily We Roll Along film, with Richard Linklater directing the film and producing along with Ginger Sledge, Jason Blum, and Jonathan Marc Sherman. Production on the film was announced to commence every few years to reflect the characters age over 20 years, similar to how Boyhood (also written and directed by Linklater) was shot over 12 years. The film is based on the latest version of Furth's book, which was adapted by Linklater and Sherman into the film's screenplay.

Blake Jenner, who collaborated with Linklater in Everybody Wants Some!!, was initially cast alongside Feldstein and Platt, but exited the film in late 2019 (after having filmed the "Our Time" sequence) following allegations of domestic abuse made by his ex-wife Melissa Benoist. Actor Paul Mescal took over the role of Franklin Shepard, and footage was reshot between late 2021 and early 2022. Principal photography and the casting of supporting roles were suspended between August and November 2023, due to the WGA and SAG-AFTRA strikes. Mallory Bechtel was cast as Beth in February 2024. Isabela Merced also auditioned for the role. In February 2025, Hannah Cruz joined the cast as Gussie Carnegie. In October, Jason Blum revealed Universal Pictures' involvement, stating that production would go on until around 2040 and Linklater said that three sequences had been shot. In March 2026, Linklater updated: "Story-wise, I'm about a third of the way through, time-wise I'm a quarter of the way through."

== See also ==
- List of films with the longest production time
