= Nikki M. James =

American actress and singer

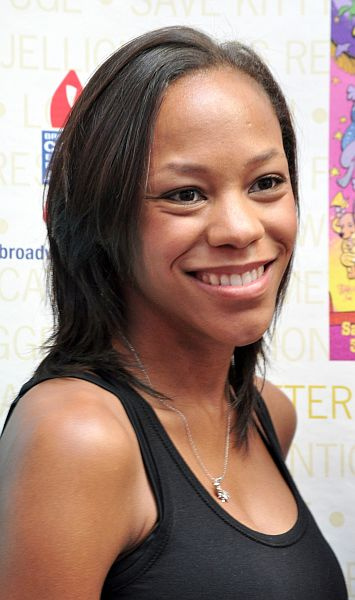
- James at the 2011 Tony Awards
- Born: Nikki Michelle James; Summit, New Jersey, U.S.
- Occupations: Actress, director, singer
- Awards: Tony Award (Best Featured Actress in a Musical)—The Book of Mormon

Nikki Michelle James is an American actress, director and singer. James has performed in the popular stage musicals The Book of Mormon, Les Misérables, and Suffs, earning a Tony Award for Best Featured Actress in a Musical for The Book of Mormon at the 65th Tony Awards. She’s best known on screen for her role in the Marvel Cinematic Universe television series Daredevil: Born Again (2025–present) on Disney+.

== Life and career ==
Nikki M. James was born to Caribbean immigrant parents, a Vincentian father and a Haitian mother who settled in New Jersey in pursuit of the American dream. James grew up in Livingston, New Jersey where she would graduate from Livingston High School. As a young girl, she sang and acted in church and in school performances. She was nominated for a Rising Star Award at Paper Mill Playhouse for her performance as Dolly Levi in Hello, Dolly! in high school. She later attended the Tisch School of the Arts at New York University.

James made her Broadway debut in The Adventures of Tom Sawyer, and starred as Ottilie in the New York City Center Encores! production of House of Flowers. She played Adela Alba in the Off-Broadway run of Michael John LaChiusa's musical adaptation of Bernarda Alba and appeared in the Broadway cast of All Shook Up.

James played Dorothy Gale in the new revival of The Wiz at La Jolla Playhouse and also starred in Romeo and Juliet and Caesar and Cleopatra at the Stratford Festival with Christopher Plummer. For her performance as Nabulungi in The Book of Mormon, she won the 2011 Tony Award for Best Featured Actress in a Musical at the 65th Tony Awards. During that run, she took a leave in June 2012 to film a screen version of Lucky Stiff. From 2014 to January 2015, she played Éponine Thénardier in the Broadway revival of Les Misérables.

In July 2017, James starred in the New York City Center Encores! staged concert of The Bubbly Black Girl Sheds Her Chameleon Skin. In 2024 she began starring as journalist and civil rights activist Ida B. Wells in the musical Suffs. James was nominated for a Tony Award for Best Featured Actress in a Musical for her performance at the 77th Tony Awards.

On March 6, 2026, she joined the Off-Broadway revival cast of Little Shop of Horrors as Audrey opposite Jordan Fisher and Andy Karl. Her final performance will be on July 19, after which Betsy Wolfe will take over the role.

She also has had many notable film and television roles as an actor, starting on Law & Order, followed by 30 Rock, The Disappearance of Eleanor Rigby, The Good Wife, Severance and Daredevil: Born Again.

== Acting and directing credits ==
=== Film ===
Year	Title	Role	Notes
2005	Pizza	April Snow	
2009	Caesar and Cleopatra	Cleopatra	Same as the 2008 theatre play
2013	All Is Bright	Betsy	
2014	The Disappearance of Eleanor Rigby	Sia	Appeared in Him, the first in a trio of films
2014	Lucky Stiff	Annabel Glick	
2021	Here After	Faith	
2022	Spoiler Alert	Nina	

=== Television ===
Year	Title	Role	Notes
2001	Third Watch	Maizie	2 episodes
2003	Law & Order: Criminal Intent	Tamara Bates	Episode: "Stray"
2004	The Jury	Myra Clarkson	Episode: "Bangers"
2009	Law & Order: Criminal Intent	Jackie	Episode: "Salome in Manhattan"
2010	30 Rock	Erica	Episode: "Gentleman's Intermission"
2012	Law & Order: Special Victims Unit	911 Operator	Episode: "Father Dearest"
2015	Law & Order: Special Victims Unit	Detective Gail Dunbar	2 episodes
2015	For Real	Candace	TV movie
2015–2016	The Good Wife	Monica Timmons	6 episodes
2016	BrainDead	Rochelle	12 episodes
2016	The Blacklist	Rose	Episode: "The Caretaker (No. 78)"
2017–2019	Welcome to the Wayne	Julia Wiles	Voice; 10 episodes
2018	Bull	Chloe Tomlin	Episode: "Gag Order"
2018–2020	The Good Fight	Monica Timmons	3 episodes
2018	Instinct	Ashley	Episode: "Blast from the Past"
2018	Escape at Dannemora	ER Doctor	Episode: "Part 5"
2019	NCIS: New Orleans	Lisa Butler	Episode: "A House Divided"
2019	Proven Innocent	Violet Bell	13 episodes
2021	Modern Love	Pam	Episode: "How Do You Remember Me?"
2022	Severance	Alexa	4 episodes
2025–present	Daredevil: Born Again	Kirsten McDuffie	Main cast; 15 episodes

=== Theatre ===
Year	Title	Role	Notes
2001	The Adventures of Tom Sawyer	Sabina Temple	Broadway (debut)
2003	House of Flowers	Ottilie	New York City Center Encores!
2003	Summer	Charity Royall	New York reading
2005	All Shook Up	Lorraine	Broadway
2006	Bernarda Alba	Adela Alba	Off-Broadway
2006	The Wiz	Dorothy Gale	La Jolla Playhouse
2007	Walmartopia	Maia Latrell	Off-Broadway
2008	Romeo and Juliet	Juliet	Stratford Shakespeare Festival
2008	Caesar and Cleopatra	Cleopatra	Same as the 2009 film release
2011–2014	The Book of Mormon	Nabulungi	Broadway
2013	Fetch Clay, Make Man	Sonji	Off-Broadway
2014–2015	Les Misérables	Éponine Thénardier	Broadway (revival)
2015	Preludes	Natalya	Off-Broadway
2016	Twelfth Night	Viola	Shakespeare in the Park
2016	Wonderful Town	Eileen Sherwood	Los Angeles Opera
2017	Julius Caesar	Portia	Shakespeare in the Park
2017	The Bubbly Black Girl Sheds Her Chameleon Skin	Bubbly	New York City Center Encores!
2018	Twelfth Night	Viola	Shakespeare in the Park
2019	A Bright Room Called Day	Agnes Eggling	The Public Theater
2022	Suffs	Ida B. Wells	The Public Theater
2023	Gutenberg! The Musical!	Guest Producer	Broadway (One night cameo)
2024–2025	Suffs	Ida B. Wells	Broadway
2024	Maybe Happy Ending	Additional Voice	Broadway (Pre-recorded voice)
2026	Little Shop of Horrors	Audrey	Off-Broadway (revival)
2026	The Lost Boys	News Anchor	Broadway (Pre-recorded voice)
2026–2027	The Book of Mormon	Nabulungi	Broadway

=== Director ===
Year	Title	Notes
2017–2019	Once on This Island	Broadway; Assistant Director
2021	The Bite	Episode: "The Fifth Wave"
2021–2022	The Good Fight	Episodes: "And the Firm Had Two Partners...", "The End of STR"

== Awards and nominations ==
Year	Award ceremony	Category	Show	Result
2011	Tony Award	Best Featured Actress in a Musical	The Book of Mormon	Won
2011	Drama Desk Award	Outstanding Featured Actress in a Musical	The Book of Mormon	Nominated
2011	Outer Critics Circle Award	Outstanding Featured Actress in a Musical	The Book of Mormon	Nominated
2019	Drama League Awards	Distinguished Performance	Twelfth Night	Nominated
2022	Drama League Awards	Distinguished Performance	Suffs	Nominated
2023	Lucille Lortel Awards	Outstanding Featured Performer in a Musical	Suffs	Nominated
2024	Tony Award	Best Featured Actress in a Musical	Suffs	Nominated
2024	Dorian Awards	Outstanding Featured Performance in a Broadway Musical	Suffs	Nominated
2024	Drama League Awards	Distinguished Performance	Suffs	Nominated
