= Vida Milholland =

American women's rights activist

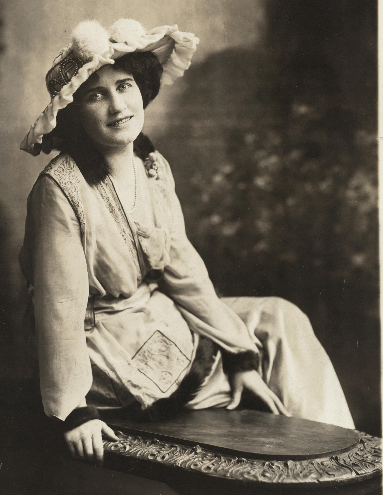
- Milholland in 1918
- Born: January 17, 1888; Brooklyn, New York, US
- Died: November 29, 1952 (aged 64); Lewis, New York, US
- Occupation: Suffragist

Vida Milholland (January 17, 1888 – November 29, 1952) was an American women's rights activist and the sister of Inez Milholland, one of the leaders of the National Woman's Party.

== Personal life ==
Vida was born in Brooklyn, New York, in 1888. Her father, John Milholland, was a founding member of the National Association for the Advancement of Colored People. She was the younger sister of the famed suffragist leader Inez Milholland. When she was a young woman she was a concert soprano. She had studied at Vassar College where she was known for athletics and drama. When her sister died in 1916 she devoted her time to suffrage work; she went to prison for three days in 1917 where she sang each night for her fellow prisoners.

== Suffrage work ==
Vida Milholland was an ardent suffragist and an active member of the militant National Woman's Party and a political ally of Alice Paul. Along with her sister Inez, she was also a member of the College Equal Suffrage League of New York State.

Milholland participated in the picketing of the White House during the first World War in support of women's suffrage. She spent time in Occoquan Workhouse as part of the Silent Sentinels protest. In 1917 Milholland told stories of her imprisonment at the Ritz-Carlton alongside Dora Lewis and others. Alva Belmont presided over this meeting. In 1919 she represented the NWP on their "Prison Special" tour of America where she sang at every meeting.

At a 1921 conference in Washington, D.C. she was honored for her part in the suffrage movement. Vida dressed in a white Crusader's costume the way Inez used to appear at a memorial for her sister in New York in 1924.

== Death ==
Vida Milholland died in Lewis, Essex County, New York on November 29, 1952.
