= Suffs =

Musical by Shaina Taub

- Broadway Promotional Poster
- Music: Shaina Taub
- Lyrics: Shaina Taub
- Book: Shaina Taub
- Basis: Women's suffrage in the United States
- Premiere: April 6, 2022: The Public Theater
- Productions: 2022 Off-Broadway; 2024 Broadway; 2025 North American Tour
- Awards: Tony Award for Best Book; Tony Award for Best Score; Drama Desk Award for Outstanding Music

Suffs is a musical with music, lyrics, and a book by Shaina Taub, based on suffragists and the American women's suffrage movement, focusing primarily on the historical events leading up to the ratification of the Nineteenth Amendment to the United States Constitution in 1920 that gave women the right to vote (though minority women continued to face discrimination).

Following its off-Broadway premiere at The Public Theater in April 2022, the Broadway production opened at the Music Box Theatre on April 18, 2024, to mostly positive reviews. Suffs was nominated for six Tony Awards, including Best Musical, winning for both Best Book and Best Score. The production closed in January 2025, and a North American tour began in September 2025 and ended in August 2026. A second North American tour is scheduled to begin in the fall of 2027.

== Plot ==
=== Act 1 ===
At the 1913 National American Woman Suffrage Association (NAWSA) Convention, Carrie Chapman Catt gives a speech calling for support for women's suffrage ("Let Mother Vote"). Alice Paul, exhausted by NAWSA's slow progress, proposes a march on Washington, D.C. on the day of President Woodrow Wilson's inauguration, to pressure him to support a federal amendment for suffrage. Carrie refuses, preferring NAWSA's approach of gaining suffrage state-by-state. Irritated and unwilling to give up, Alice resolves to see equality for all achieved in her lifetime ("Finish the Fight"). She recruits her college friend Lucy Burns (Note: The two did not attend college together: they actually met while demonstrating in London.) to help organize the march themselves, and they further recruit socialite Inez Milholland and Polish labor organizer Ruza Wenclawska, and accept visiting Nebraska college student Doris Stevens as their secretary ("Find a Way"). As the march approaches, Southern delegations object to Black women marching alongside white women in their respective delegations. Not wanting to derail the march, Alice elects to compromise by setting up a separate colored women delegation; prominent African-American journalist and activist Ida B. Wells confronts the organizers to declare her intention to march with her own state delegation, and harshly criticizes Alice for being willing to compromise with the march's Southern backers at the expense of Black women ("Wait My Turn").

On the morning of the march, Ida runs into her friend and fellow Black activist Mary Church Terrell, along with her daughter Phyllis. Ida favors direct actions to draw attention, while Mary prefers an approach of "dignified agitation", working within the system to fight for colored women's rights, which causes a rift between them, though they both march with the hope of uplifting Black voices ("Terrell's Theme"). The Woman Suffrage Procession faces some violent pushback, but they succeed in completing the march ("The March (We Demand Equality)"). As the organizers celebrate, Doris expresses distress over having been called a "bitch" by one of the counter-protestors. Alice, Ruza, Inez, and Lucy encourage Doris to embrace this label as a sign of her strength in the face of sexist men ("Great American Bitch"). Carrie offers NAWSA's backing to the newly-formed Congressional Union (CU) for Woman Suffrage, made up of the march's organizers, although she and Alice still disagree on their respective approaches. The CU go to the White House for a meeting with Wilson, who offers them lip service about his condescending and chauvinistic adoration for women ("Ladies"), but continually puts off publicly showing support in his first term. A frustrated Alice suggests NAWSA withdraw their support, but Carrie refuses to antagonize Wilson as he has pledged to keep the U.S. out of the war in Europe.

Alice's commitment to the movement takes a toll on her personal and social life, but she tells herself focusing on achieving women's suffrage will be worth the sacrifice ("Worth It"). Doris educates Wilson's chief of staff Dudley Field Malone on the movement by offering a hypothetical scenario of her rights if they were husband-and-wife; the two gradually fall for each other ("If We Were Married"). At the 1916 NAWSA Convention the divisions among the Suffs become clear; Mary, an invited speaker, wants to use her speech to highlight race, while Ida points out that NAWSA uses Mary to insulate themselves from being called racist. The CU disrupts the convention by publicly calling for NAWSA to organize against Wilson's reelection, criticizing the slower approach of "irrelevant old fogies" like Carrie ("The Convention Part 1"). Stunned and offended at having her contributions to the movement brushed aside ("This Girl"), Carrie publicly condemns Alice and privately informs her that her actions have no place in NAWSA ("The Convention Part 2"). With the CU effectively kicked out of NAWSA, Alice founds the National Woman's Party (NWP) and recruits Alva Belmont, a wealthy socialite and NAWSA donor, to fund it and continue with their anti-Wilson efforts ("Alva Belmont"). The NWP plans a campaign tour calling for women in states where they have voting rights to vote against Wilson. Inez tries to take a leave of absence due to exhaustion, but is convinced by Alice to go on the tour ("Show Them Who You Are"). Their efforts to vote Wilson out are unsuccessful and Wilson is re-elected ("The Campaign"); to make matters worse, a devastated Lucy returns from the tour with the news that Inez collapsed and died during one of her speeches, having hidden her anemia from the others. Heartbroken, the Suffs hold a vigil for Inez, and resolve to continue in her honor ("How Long?").

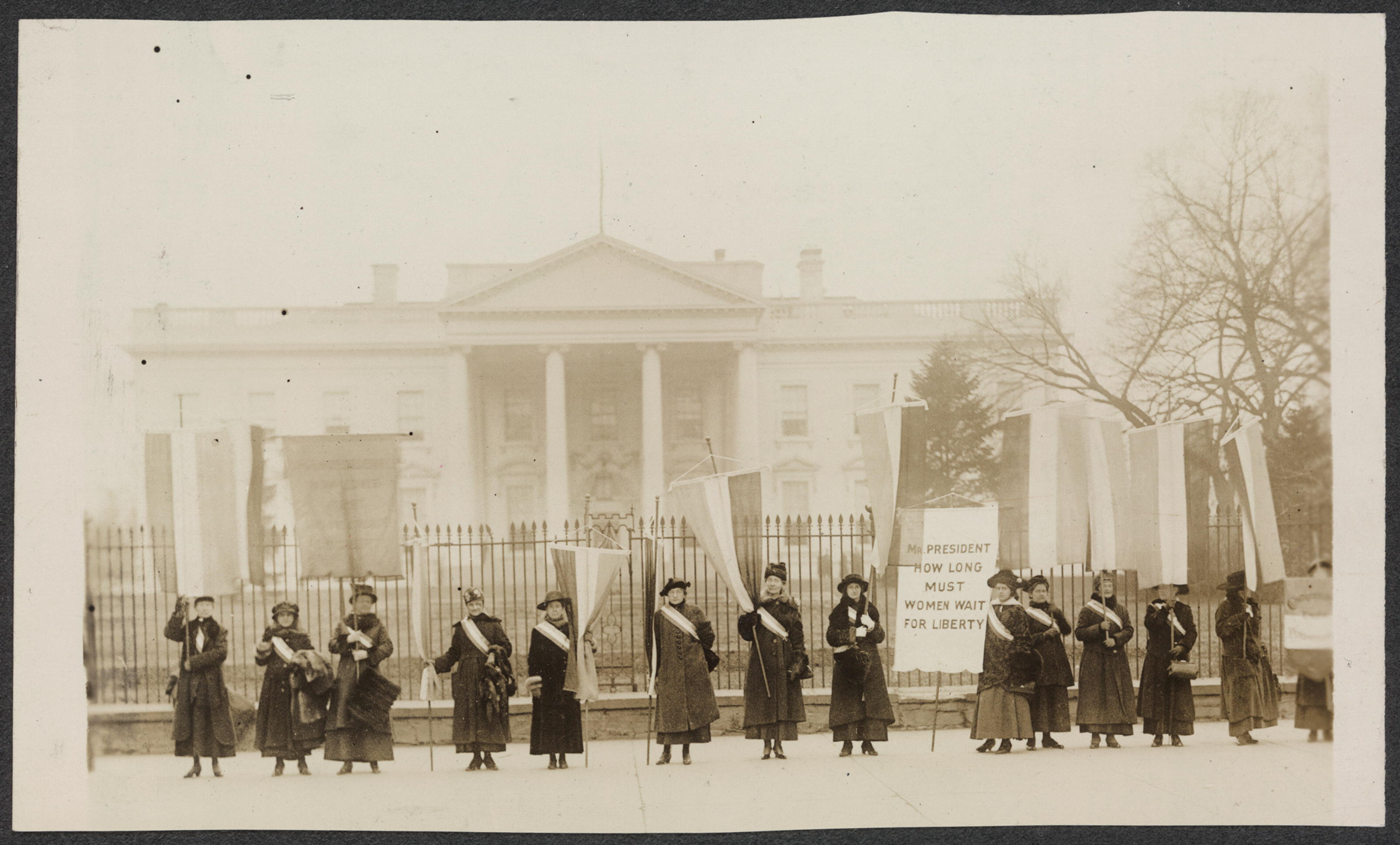
Suffragists holding suffrage banners similar to lyrics in the musical

=== Act 2 ===
The NWP organize the Silent Sentinels, standing in silence outside the White House gates until Wilson publicly supports suffrage. When Wilson declares that the U.S. will join the Great War, they hold up banners with his own words printed on them to highlight his hypocrisy, only to be arrested on Wilson's orders ("The Young Are At The Gates") and sentenced for the trumped up charge of obstructing traffic. Dudley, disgusted with Wilson and convinced of the cause, publicly resigns ("Respectfully Yours, Dudley Malone"). At Occoquan Workhouse, the group stages a hunger strike to protest their arrest, much to the frustration of Mrs. Herndon, the strict but sympathetic prison matron. The group soon falls into conflict as Ruza accuses Alice of trying to get them all killed with her methods, with Lucy and Doris unable to quell the argument ("Hold It Together"). Meanwhile, Carrie continues to back Wilson despite misgivings about his broken promises and treatment of the suffragists in prison. Dudley helps free Doris from prison by posing as her husband and joins the NWP. Mary argues with Ida about publicly condemning the war, as both express their fatigue over constantly fighting for Black women's rights and being ignored at every turn ("Wait My Turn (reprise)"). The strikers smuggle letters out of the prison with the help of Mrs. Herndon, describing the horrific abuse by prison staff; Wilson publishes press reports contradicting the letters ("The Report"). As Alice slowly starves to death in solitary confinement, she is met by prison staff member Dr. White, who threatens to have her committed if she continues striking. A hallucination of Inez confronts Alice, warning she will be no good to the wider movement if she dies ("Show Them Who You Are (reprise)"). Taking Inez's advice, Alice tells Dr. White she is willing to be called insane so long as it is known she is still fighting for what she believes in, and ends her hunger strike ("Insane"). White is moved by her words and refuses to have her committed, despite Wilson's orders.

Doris leaks the letters to the press, forcing Wilson to free the rest of the strikers. As the NWP burn Wilson in effigy after the war, a frustrated Carrie tells him that his broken promises have alienated even his less-radical base in NAWSA, and that he can easily quell dissent by supporting suffrage and publicly giving the credit to NAWSA ("Fire & Tea"). Wilson finally does so, but snidely reminds Carrie they still need enough state legislatures to ratify the amendment ("Let Mother Vote (reprise)"). In 1920, on the morning of the final vote for the Nineteenth Amendment in Tennessee, Carrie and Alice run into each other. At first they passive-aggressively blame each other for their struggles, but Carrie has an epiphany when she realizes that she was once the young upstart in the suffrage movement to the more conservative Susan B. Anthony, and that Alice chose the path of forceful resistance that Carrie had left behind ("She and I"). The Nineteenth Amendment vote comes down to a single vote from Representative Harry T. Burn, who is convinced to change his vote from a "Nay" to an "Aye" at the last minute after receiving a telegram from his mother, Febb Burn, who reveals that she blames Wilson for her husband's death in the War but lacks the ability to vote against him ("A Letter From Harry's Mother"). Ida and Mary celebrate their success, but sadly acknowledge that Black women (and men) will often be prevented from voting; Phyllis encourages them to keep faith that the movement will continue. The other women celebrate the amendment's passing ("I Was Here"); as Dudley and Doris plan to wed, Carrie invites her professional and romantic partner Mollie Hay to join her on a diplomatic trip abroad, as they lament that they do not have the freedom to truly live as a married couple ("If We Were Married (reprise)").

Alice pitches the NWP's next goal of getting the Equal Rights Amendment (ERA) passed. However, the entire group is exhausted and decide to quit organizing: Doris plans to publish her memoirs about her experiences in the movement; Ruza wants to act on Broadway (“August 26th, 1920”). Lucy decides to retire from activism, though she assures Alice she values their shared fight ("Lucy's Song"). In the 1970s, an aged but still active Alice meets young activist Robin (played by the actress who played Phyllis), a representative from National Organization for Women who seeks Alice's support on radical movements. Alice disagrees with Robin's call for an intersectional approach, preferring the singular focus on the ERA, but is taken aback when Robin accuses her of being behind in her ways and points out how the 19th Amendment didn't make voting easier for Black women ("Finish the Fight (reprise)"). Realizing she has become the "old fogey" that Carrie was to her, Alice accepts she will not live to see the end of the fight for equality, but declares that it will happen one day so long as people maintain their resolve ("Keep Marching").

== Cast and characters ==
Character	Off-Broadway	Broadway	US Tour
Character	2022	2024	2025
Alice Paul	Shaina Taub	Shaina Taub	Maya Keleher
Carrie Chapman Catt	Jenn Colella	Jenn Colella	Marya Grandy
Ida B. Wells	Nikki M. James	Nikki M. James	Danyel Fulton
Lucy Burns	Ally Bonino	Ally Bonino	Gwynne Wood
Doris Stevens	Nadia Dandashi	Nadia Dandashi	Livvy Marcus
Ruza Wenclawska	Hannah Cruz	Kim Blanck	Joyce Meimei Zheng
Inez Milholland	Phillipa Soo	Hannah Cruz	Monica Tulia Ramirez
Mary Church Terrell	Cassondra James	Anastaćia McCleskey	Trisha Jeffrey
Dudley Malone	Tsilala Brock	Tsilala Brock	Brandi Porter
Woodrow Wilson	Grace McLean	Grace McLean	Jenny Ashman
Phyllis Terrell	J. Riley Jr.	Laila Erica Drew	Victoria Pekel
Robin	Amina Faye	Laila Erica Drew	Victoria Pekel
Mollie Hay	Jaygee Macapugay	Jaygee Macapugay	Tami Dahbura
Alva Belmont / Febb Burn	Aisha de Haas	Emily Skinner	Laura Stracko
Harry T. Burn	Jenna Bainbridge	Jenna Bainbridge	Jenna Lea Rosen
Mrs. Herndon	Ada Westfall	Ada Westfall	Gretchen Shope

== Songs ==
Act I

- "Let Mother Vote" - Carrie, Ensemble
- "Finish the Fight" - Alice
- "Find a Way" - Alice, Lucy, Inez, Ruza, Doris, Major Sylvester, Ida, Ensemble
- "Wait My Turn" - Ida
- "Terrell's Theme" - Phyllis, Ida, Mary
- "The March (We Demand Equality)" - Inez, Ida, Ensemble
- "Great American Bitch" - Ruza, Inez, Lucy, Alice, Doris
- "Ladies" - Woodrow Wilson
- "A Meeting with President Wilson" - Ruza, Lucy, Dudley, Inez, Doris, Woodrow Wilson, Alice
- "Worth It" - Alice, Lucy, Carrie, Inez, Ida, Mary
- "If We Were Married" - Dudley, Doris
- "The Convention Part 1" - Carrie, Ida, Mary, Alice, Mollie, Ensemble
- "This Girl" - Carrie
- "The Convention Part 2" - Carrie, Ida, Mary, Alice, Ensemble
- "Alva Belmont" - Alva, Ruza, Lucy, Inez, Doris, Alice
- "Show Them Who You Are" - Alice, Inez
- "The Campaign" - Inez, Ruza, Lucy, Doris, Alice
- "How Long?" - Alice, Lucy, Doris, Carrie, Mary, Ida, Ensemble

Act II

- "The Young Are at the Gates" - Doris, Lucy, Ruza, Alice, Phyllis, Alva, Ensemble
- "Respectfully Yours, Dudley Malone" - Dudley
- "Hold It Together" - Mary, Mrs. Herndon, Alice, Ruza, Lucy, Doris, Dudley, Carrie, Mollie, Ida
- "Wait My Turn (reprise)" - Ida, Mary
- "The Report" - Woodrow Wilson, Doris, Dudley, Ruza, Lucy, Alice
- "Show Them Who You Are (reprise)" - Inez
- "Insane" - Alice
- "Fire & Tea" - Mrs. Herndon, Carrie, Doris, Woodrow Wilson, Alice, Ruza, Mollie, Ensemble
- "Let Mother Vote (reprise)" - Woodrow Wilson
- "She and I" - Carrie, Alice
- "Down at the State House" - Harry T. Burn, Ensemble
- "A Letter from Harry's Mother" - Febb Burn, Harry T. Burn, Alice
- "I Was Here" - Ida, Mary, Phyllis, ensemble
- "If We Were Married (reprise)" - Dudley, Doris, Carrie, Mollie
- "August 26th, 1920" - Ruza, Lucy, Doris, Alice
- "Lucy's Song" - Lucy
- "Finish the Fight (reprise)" - Robin, Alice
- "Keep Marching" - Alice, Ensemble

== Development ==
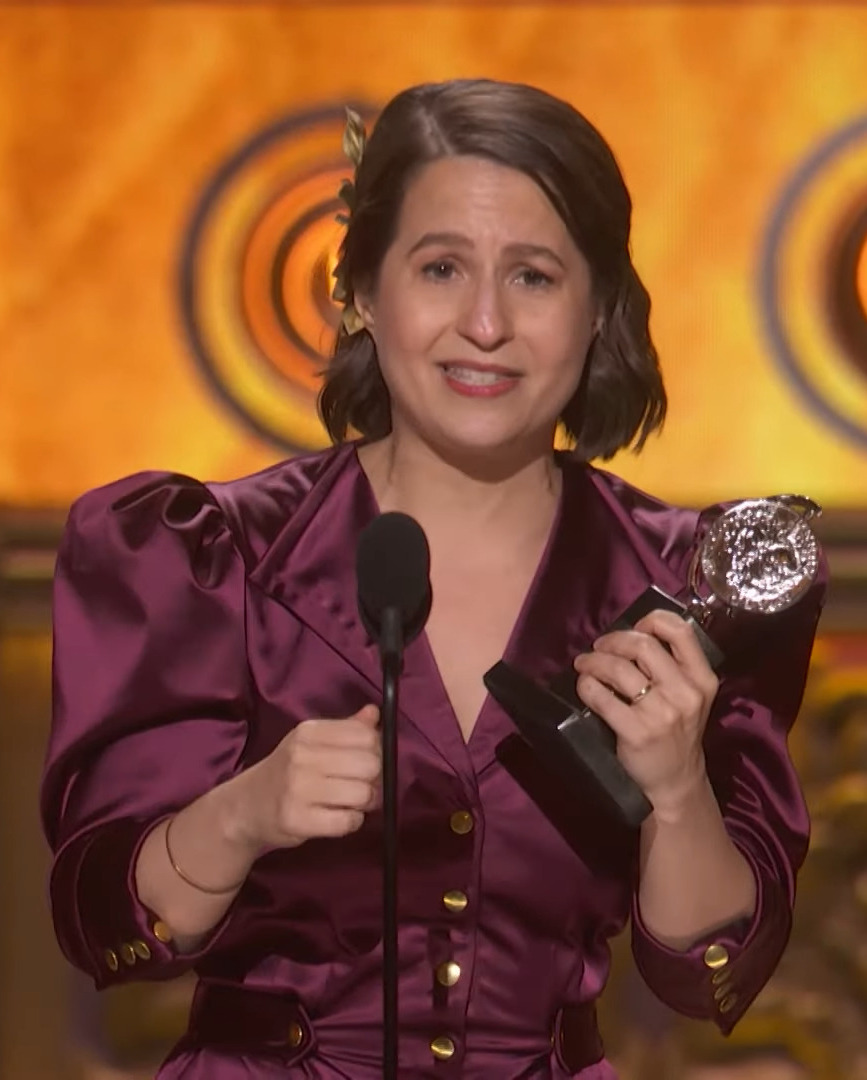
Taub won Tony Awards for her book and score for the musical.

Producer Rachel Sussman conceived of the idea for a suffragist musical in middle school, and later gave Shaina Taub (pictured) a copy of Doris Stevens' account, Jailed for Freedom. Taub then went on to write the book, becoming only the second woman in Broadway history to also write the lyrics, music, and star in her own work.

The musical, originally titled Suffragist, had been planned to premiere at the Public in fall of 2020 with a cast that would have included Stephanie Hsu and Kate Wetherhead, but this was delayed due to the COVID-19 pandemic. Further plans were made to open it at the Delacorte Theater as part of the return of the Public's Shakespeare in the Park season in the following summer, before the decision was made to delay it into 2022.

The plots of the Off-Broadway and Broadway versions of Suffs are roughly identical, but in making changes Taub focused on tightening the story and improving the development of the supporting characters. Songs from the originally sung-through score were cut (including its original Brechtian opening number, "Watch Out for the Suffragette!") and either turned into new songs or replaced by dialogue. Characters removed after the Off-Broadway production include Nina Otero-Warren and Edith Wilson. The latter was a dual role with President Wilson and figured in a comedic scene where actor Grace McLean switched characters onstage after Wilson suffers a stroke: Taub decided that while the scene was a "huge delight" for the audience, it was too distracting due to the real Edith Wilson's staunchly anti-suffrage stance.

== Production history ==
=== Off-Broadway (2022) ===
The musical, now called Suffs, began previews on March 13, 2022, at The Public Theater. It was initially going to open on April 6, 2022, but the preview the night before as well as the opening night were cancelled due to a large number of positive COVID-19 cases among the cast. The production was initially announced to run until April 24 but was extended until May 29, 2022. Directed by Leigh Silverman, it starred Taub as Alice Paul, Jenn Colella as Carrie Chapman Catt, Nikki M. James as Ida B. Wells, Ally Bonino as Lucy Burns, Phillipa Soo as Inez Milholland, Hannah Cruz as Ruza Wenclawska, Nadia Dandashi as Doris Stevens, Grace McLean as Woodrow Wilson, Tsilala Brock as Dudley Field Malone, Jenna Bainbridge as Harry T. Burn, Aisha de Haas as Alva Belmont and Febb Burn, Jaygee Macapugay as Mollie Hay, Cassondra James as Mary Church Terrell, J. Riley Jr. as Phyllis Terrell, Amina Faye as Robin, and Ada Westfall as Mrs. Herndon.

=== Broadway (2024–2025) ===
The show began previews on March 26, 2024, and opened on April 18 at the Music Box Theatre. Taub became the second woman in Broadway history "to write the book, music, lyrics, and star in her own musical." Among the producers are former Secretary of State and first lady Hillary Clinton and activist Malala Yousafzai. Most of the off-Broadway cast reprised their roles. Kim Blanck, Emily Skinner, Laila Erica Drew, and Anastaćia McCleskey also joined the Broadway cast. Silverman returned to direct; new members of the creative team include Mayte Natalio, choreography; Riccardo Hernandez, sets; Paul Tazewell, costumes; Lap Chi Chu, lighting; Jason Crystal, sound; and Michael Starobin, orchestrations. The production closed on January 5, 2025,

The production was filmed in December 2024 for Great Performances, and PBS aired the musical on May 8, 2026.

=== North American tour (2025) ===
A North American tour began in September 2025 at the Capitol Theatre in Yakima, Washington, with stops in 26 other cities scheduled through August 2026.

== Awards and nominations ==
=== 2022 Off-Broadway ===
Year	Award	Category	Nominee	Result
2022	Lucille Lortel Awards	Outstanding Musical		Nominated
2022	Lucille Lortel Awards	Outstanding Featured Performer in a Musical	Nikki M. James	Nominated
2022	Drama League Awards	Outstanding Production of a Musical		Nominated
2022	Drama League Awards	Outstanding Direction of a Musical	Leigh Silverman	Nominated
2022	Drama League Awards	Distinguished Performance	Nikki M. James	Nominated
2022	Outer Critics Circle Awards	Outstanding Actress in a Musical	Jenn Colella	Nominated
2022	Drama Desk Awards	Outstanding Lyrics	Shaina Taub	Nominated

=== 2024 Broadway ===
Year	Award	Category	Nominee	Result
2024	Tony Awards	Best Musical		Nominated
2024	Tony Awards	Best Book of a Musical	Shaina Taub	Won
2024	Tony Awards	Best Original Score	Shaina Taub	Won
2024	Tony Awards	Best Featured Actress in a Musical	Nikki M. James	Nominated
2024	Tony Awards	Best Direction of a Musical	Leigh Silverman	Nominated
2024	Tony Awards	Best Costume Design of a Musical	Paul Tazewell	Nominated
2024	Drama League Awards	Outstanding Production of a Musical		Nominated
2024	Drama League Awards	Outstanding Direction of a Musical	Leigh Silverman	Nominated
2024	Drama League Awards	Distinguished Performance	Nikki M. James	Nominated
2024	Drama League Awards	Distinguished Performance	Jenn Colella	Nominated
2024	Outer Critics Circle Awards	Outstanding New Broadway Musical		Won
2024	Outer Critics Circle Awards	Outstanding Book of a Musical	Shaina Taub	Won
2024	Outer Critics Circle Awards	Outstanding New Score	Shaina Taub	Won
2024	Outer Critics Circle Awards	Outstanding Orchestrations	Michael Starobin	Nominated
2024	Outer Critics Circle Awards	Outstanding Direction of a Musical	Leigh Silverman	Nominated
2024	Drama Desk Awards	Outstanding Featured Performance in a Musical	Emily Skinner	Nominated
2024	Drama Desk Awards	Outstanding Music	Shaina Taub	Won
2024	Drama Desk Awards	Outstanding Orchestrations	Michael Starobin, Shaina Taub, and Andrea Grody	Nominated
2024	Drama Desk Awards	Set Design	Riccardo Hernández	Nominated
2024	Drama Desk Awards	Costume Design	Paul Tazewell	Won
2024	Drama Desk Awards	Outstanding Lighting Design	Lap Chi Chu	Nominated
2024	Drama Desk Awards	Outstanding Sound Design	Jason Crystal	Nominated
2024	Drama Desk Awards	Outstanding Wig and Hair	Charles G. LaPoint	Nominated

== Reception ==
The Off-Broadway production of Suffs received mixed to positive reviews. The production's cast, score, and direction received praise, but criticism was leveled at the musical's book, runtime, and overall structure. Raven Snook of Time Out gave the musical four stars out of five but opined that, despite efforts by the production to highlight Ida B. Wells and Mary Church Terrell, their story still felt sidelined by the overall narrative. It was compared with Hamilton, which like Suffs is a historical musical that debuted in the Newman Theater at the Public, featuring Phillipa Soo in a starring role.

The Broadway production saw mostly positive reviews. Elisabeth Vincentelli of The Washington Post wrote that "while it did not magically morph into a great show, Version 2.0 is tighter, more confident, often rousing and downright entertaining." She praised the revisions which placed more focus on the ensemble and which better acknowledged the shortfalls of the white suffragists to include their Black counterparts, but felt that the book did not explore each character enough. Sara Holdren, writing in Vulture, felt similarly. Frank Rizzo, writing for Variety, called the production "smart, inspiring and thoroughly entertaining," impressed that the show covered seven years of events "efficiently and effectively with artful modulations of intensity, humor, sadness, spunk and joy". He praised Taub's "rich musical palette" and the choice to focus on internal divisions within the women's suffrage movement rather than male pushback to the movement.

== See also ==
- Iron Jawed Angels (2004 film)
