= John Milholland =

John Elmer Milholland
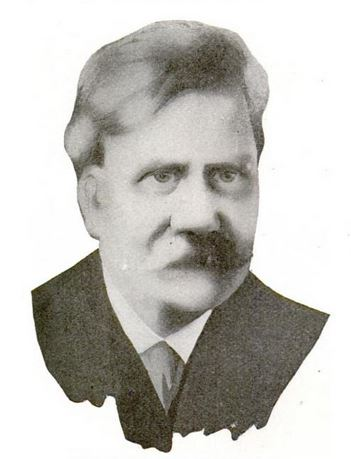
- Born: May 20, 1860; Lewis, New York, US
- Died: June 29, 1925
- Known for: First treasurer of NAACP; Journalist; Businessman

John Elmer Milholland (May 20, 1860 – June 29, 1925) was an American businessman. He served as the first treasurer of the National Association for the Advancement of Colored People (NAACP). Milholland was an editor at the New-York Tribune for twelve years. His company spearheaded work on early pneumatic tubes in New York City.

== Biography ==
John Elmer Milholland was born in Lewis, New York, on May 20, 1860, to John and Mary Moore Milholland. His parents were Irish immigrants, and when he was three their house burned down. His mother and sister were killed, and his father returned with Milholland to Ireland. After two years, Milholland returned to America, where his father opened a confectioners shop. Educated at Paterson High School, Milholland was aided by William Walter Phelps and attended New York University.

After two years, he dropped out and became a journalist, working for the Ticonderoga, New York Sentinel, which he eventually bought. Milholland subsequently sold the paper and was employed by the New York Tribune, where he reached chief editorial writer. Milholland's friend Harry Reid urged Benjamin Harrison to appoint Milholland as chief inspector of immigration for the Port of New York. Reid was nominated for vice president, in large part through the work of Milholland, for which he was named assistant secretary of the National Republican Party. Milholland soon destroyed his political career by campaigning against Tammany Hall politicians.

He also invested in the Batcheller Pneumatic Tube Co., eventually becoming its president. The corporation worked on the first pneumatic tube lines in New York City (see Pneumatic tube mail in New York City). Expanding into other markets, by 1900, Milholland was worth $500,000. An antiexpansionist, Milholland soon moved to London, where he founded the International Union Club, which supported the Boers. In 1904, he created a syndicate that controlled much of the pneumatic mail in Europe.

He used the large amounts of money he earned to fund several civil-rights activists, first Booker T. Washington, and later W. E. B. Du Bois. Milholland was criticized for these donations, and was soon removed from the board of the corporation. He then expanded his funding of civil rights, funding Mary Ovington, and investing in Phipps Houses; as well as helping to organize the Constitution League, a forerunner of the National Association for the Advancement of Colored People (NAACP). "The NAACP was founded in part because of Milholland's financial support of Ovington, as she used the money he gave her to travel and recruit people to answer "the Call" to create the NAACP. Milholland was the NAACP's first treasurer." Milholland married Jean Torrey, and had three children, Vida, John and Inez Milholland. Vida and Inez were both notable women's rights activists. In 1911, he attended the First Universal Races Congress. He died on June 29, 1925, at his home on 247 Fifth Avenue, after a short illness.

In February 1928, a bust of Milholland was unveiled at the Norman School in Pennsylvania. A bust to him was also erected at Howard University.
