= Kensington Secondary School =

Coordinates: 33.90843°S 18.50699°E

Kensington Secondary School is a school in Johannesburg, Gauteng, South Africa.
Kensington Secondary School is a school in Sunderland str, Kensington, Cape Town, South Africa.
