= Ben Levi Ross =

American stage actor

- Ross in 2026
- Born: January 15, 1998 (age 28)
- Education: Carnegie Mellon University (attended)
- Occupations: Actor; singer
- Years active: 2017–present

Benjamin Levi Ross (born January 15, 1998) is an American stage actor and singer. He (Note: Ross uses he/him and they/them pronouns. This article uses masculine pronouns for consistency.) is best known for his work in the stage musical Dear Evan Hansen, where he was Evan on Broadway and in the national tour. He received a Tony Award and Grammy Award nomination for his performance in the second Broadway revival of Ragtime as Mother's Younger Brother.

== Early life and education ==
Ross was born to a Jewish family on January 15, 1998, and grew up in Santa Monica, California. He attended Santa Monica High School, where he was active in his school's theater program, and during the summer, he trained at Interlochen Center for the Arts.. In 2016, he was named a Presidential Scholar of the Arts as part of the 2016 U.S. Presidential Scholars Program. He was also a grand prize finalist for the 2016 Music Center Spotlight awards. Following high school, he attended Carnegie Mellon University for a year and a half.

== Career ==
At an audition for the play The Low Road at New York's Public Theater, Ross was noticed by Dear Evan Hansen director Michael Greif, who told Ross that he would be great as an understudy in the cast of Dear Evan Hansen. Soon after, he joined Dear Evan Hansen's cast, and made his Broadway debut as the character Jared. Ross then spent ten months understudying for the roles of Evan, Connor, and Jared. In 2018, he left the Broadway company and joined the first national tour of the show in the titular role. He left the production on September 15, 2019.

From January 29 to February 3, 2020, Ross starred as Henry in the Kennedy Center's production of Next to Normal. In 2021, Ross appeared in the film Tick, Tick... Boom! as Freddy.

From March to May 2022, he returned to the Broadway production of Dear Evan Hansen in the title role of Evan Hansen for a limited engagement.

In the summer of 2024, Ross starred as Nick Carraway in Florence Welch's Gatsby: An American Myth at the American Repertory Theatre. Later that year in the fall, he portrayed Mother's Younger Brother in the New York City Center production of Ragtime opposite Joshua Henry, Caissie Levy and Colin Donnell. He joined the cast of the CBS drama Elsbeth in season two, in a recurring role as title character Elsbeth Tascioni's son Teddy. He went on to reprise his Ragtime role beginning in September 2025 at the Vivian Beaumont Theatre. Ross will depart the show early on July 12th ahead of its closing on August 16th, 2026.

== Personal life ==
Ross is gay and non-binary, using they/them and he/him pronouns.

== Filmography ==
| Year | Title | Role | Notes | Ref. |
|---|---|---|---|---|
| 2021 | Tick, Tick... Boom! | Freddy | Film | |
| 2024-present | Elsbeth | Teddy Tascioni | Recurring | |

== Theater credits ==
| Year | Title | Role | Notes | Ref. |
|---|---|---|---|---|
| 2017–18 | Dear Evan Hansen | Evan / Jared / Connor (understudy) | Music Box Theater, Broadway | |
| 2018–19 | Dear Evan Hansen | Evan Hansen | National tour | |
| 2020 | Next to Normal | Henry | Kennedy Center | |
| 2022 | Dear Evan Hansen | Evan Hansen | Music Box Theater, Broadway | |
| 2024 | The Connector | Ethan Dobson | MCC Theater, Off-Broadway | |
| 2024 | Gatsby: An American Myth | Nick Carraway | American Repertory Theatre | |
| 2024 | Ragtime | Mother's Younger Brother | New York City Center, Off-Broadway | |
| 2025 | The Connector | Ethan Dobson | Webster Hall | |
| 2025–26 | Ragtime | Mother's Younger Brother | Vivian Beaumont Theatre, Broadway | |

== Awards and nominations ==
| Year | Award | Category | Show | Result | Ref. |
|---|---|---|---|---|---|
| 2019 | BroadwayWorld Los Angeles Awards | Best Leading Actor in a Musical - Tour | Dear Evan Hansen | Won | |
| 2019 | BroadwayWorld Washington D.C. Awards | Best Actor in a Musical - Large Professional Theatre | Dear Evan Hansen | Won | |
| 2020 | Eliot Norton Awards | Outstanding Visiting Musical Performance | Dear Evan Hansen | Won | |
| 2024 | Drama Desk Awards | Outstanding Lead Performance in a Musical | The Connector | Nominated | |
| 2026 | Outer Critics Circle Awards | Outstanding Featured Performer in a Broadway Musical | Ragtime | Won | |
| 2026 | Drama Desk Awards | Outstanding Featured Performance in a Musical | Ragtime | Won | |
| 2026 | Broadway.com Audience Awards | Favorite Featured Actor in a Musical | Ragtime | Nominated | |
| 2026 | Tony Awards | Best Featured Actor in a Musical | Ragtime | Nominated | |
| 2026 | Dorian Award | Outstanding Featured Performance in a Broadway Musical | Ragtime | Nominated | |
| 2027 | Grammy Awards | Best Musical Theater Album | Ragtime | Pending | |

== See also ==
- LGBT culture in New York City
- List of LGBT people from New York City
- NYC Pride March
