= Edred Utomi =

American stage actor and singer

- Born: October 1, 1991 (age 35)
- Education: University of San Diego
- Occupation: Actor
- Years active: 2013–present
- Known for: Portraying Alexander Hamilton
- Notable work: Angelica National Tour of Hamilton; The House Theatre of Chicago's The Nutcracker
- Spouse: Hannah Cruz (married 2024-present)

Edred Utomi (born October 1, 1991) is an American stage actor known for playing Alexander Hamilton in the Angelica National Tour of Hamilton, Fritz in the West Coast premiere of The House Theatre of Chicago's The Nutcracker and the role of Peter in My Mañana Comes.

== Life and career ==
Utomi was born to Nigerian immigrants. He was raised in Las Vegas before relocating to attend the University of San Diego. Utomi graduated with a communications degree before pursuing a career in musical theater.

Beginning his career in 2013, immediately after graduating from USD, Utomi has performed in U.S. regional theatre productions. Before being cast as Alexander Hamilton, he performed in plays throughout Southern California including Dr. Seuss' How the Grinch Stole Christmas! The Musical and A Midsummer Night's Dream.

Utomi expressed that Miranda's previous musical In The Heights motivated him to pursue a career in musical theatre. He was cast as Alexander Hamilton a year after taking on the understudy roles of the titular character, as well as Thomas Jefferson, Aaron Burr and George Washington. Utomi was attached to the role of Alexander Hamilton indefinitely in January 2019.

Utomi married Hannah Cruz in 2024. In 2026, the two starred on Broadway at the same time—Utomi in Hamilton and Cruz in Chess—in adjoining theaters.

== Stage credits ==
Year	Title	Role	Location	Notes
2013	Midsummer		Intrepid Theatre	
2014	The Nutcracker	Fritz	New Village Arts Theatre	The House Theatre of Chicago West Coast Premiere
2015	My Mañana Comes	Peter	San Diego Repertory Theatre	
2016	Joseph and the Amazing Technicolor Dreamcoat	Pharaoh and Levi	Cerritos Center for the Performing Arts	
2017	Dr. Seuss' How the Grinch Stole Christmas! The Musical	Grown-Up Who Ensemble	Old Globe Theatre	
2018	Hamilton	S/b Alexander Hamilton, Aaron Burr, George Washington	Angelica National Tour	
2019-2023	Hamilton	Alexander Hamilton	Angelica National Tour	
2025-2026	Hamilton	Alexander Hamilton	Richard Rogers Theatre	Broadway
