= Jailed for Freedom =

1920 history book by Doris Steven

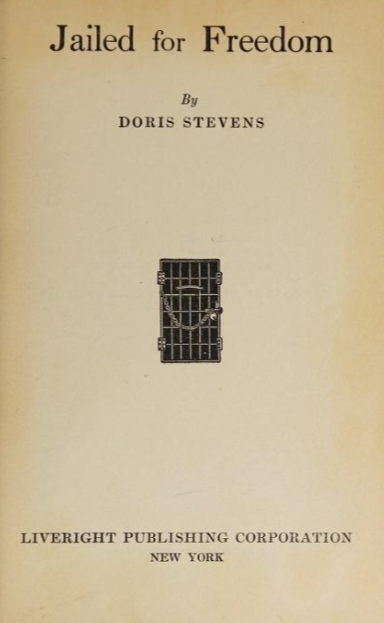
- Title page for Jailed for Freedom (1920)
- Author: Doris Stevens
- Genre: History
- Publication date: 1920

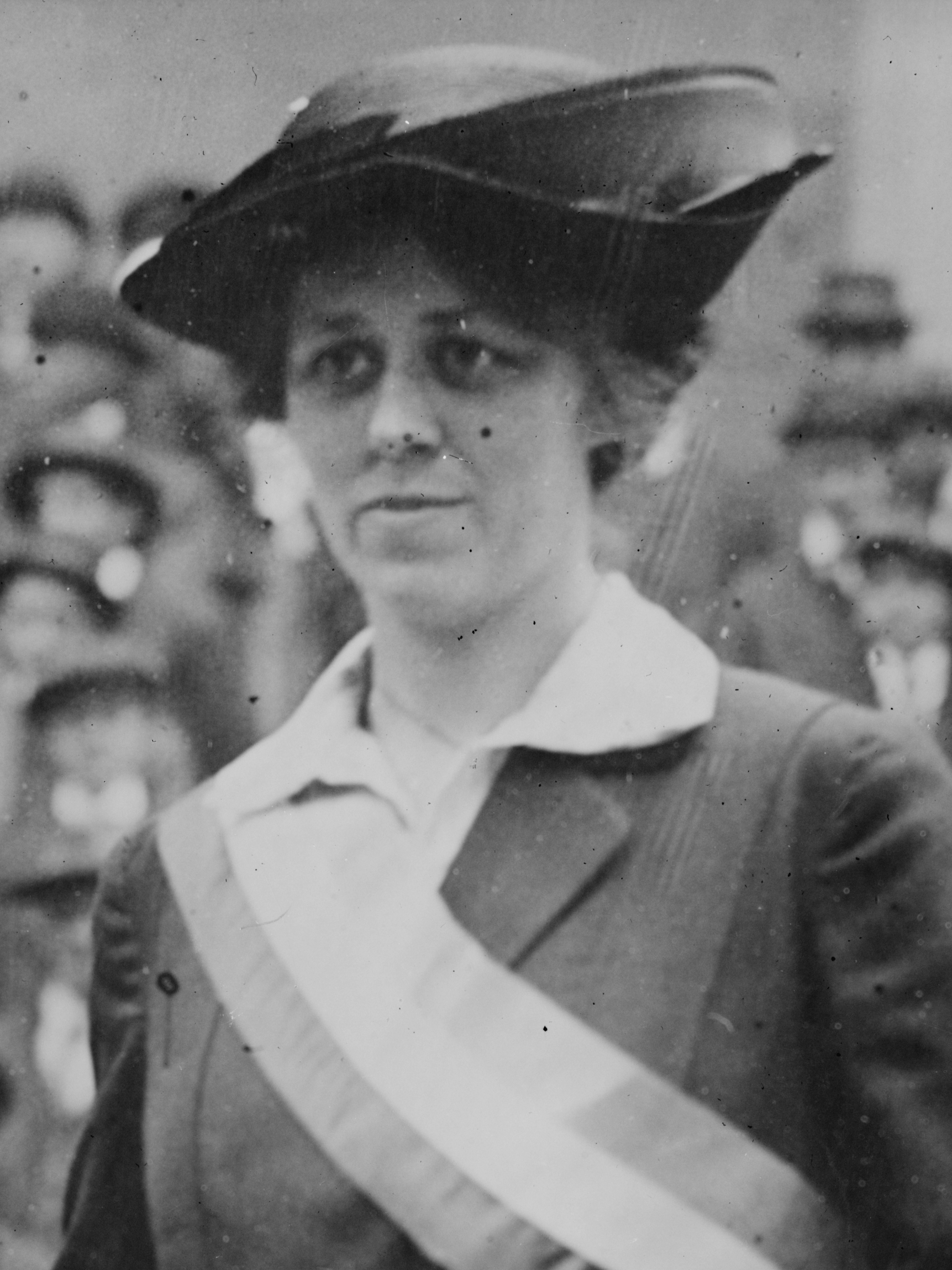
Doris Stevens, suffragist, author of Jailed for Freedom

Jailed for Freedom is a book by Doris Stevens. Originally published in 1920, it was reissued by New Sage Press in 1995 in commemoration of the 75th anniversary of the Nineteenth Amendment to the United States Constitution. This commemorative edition was edited by Carol O'Hare to update the language for a modern audience. Jailed for Freedom was reissued again in 2020 in a 100th anniversary edition.

The Historical Journal of Massachusetts characterizes the book as "a lengthy and sympathetic account of these events". Johanna Neumann in The Wall Street Journal ranked Jailed for Freedom number one on her list of the five best books on the fight for women's suffrage. Jailed for Freedom is extensively quoted in Encyclopædia Britannica's Annals of American History in the essay "Suffragettes Criminals or Political Prisoners?"

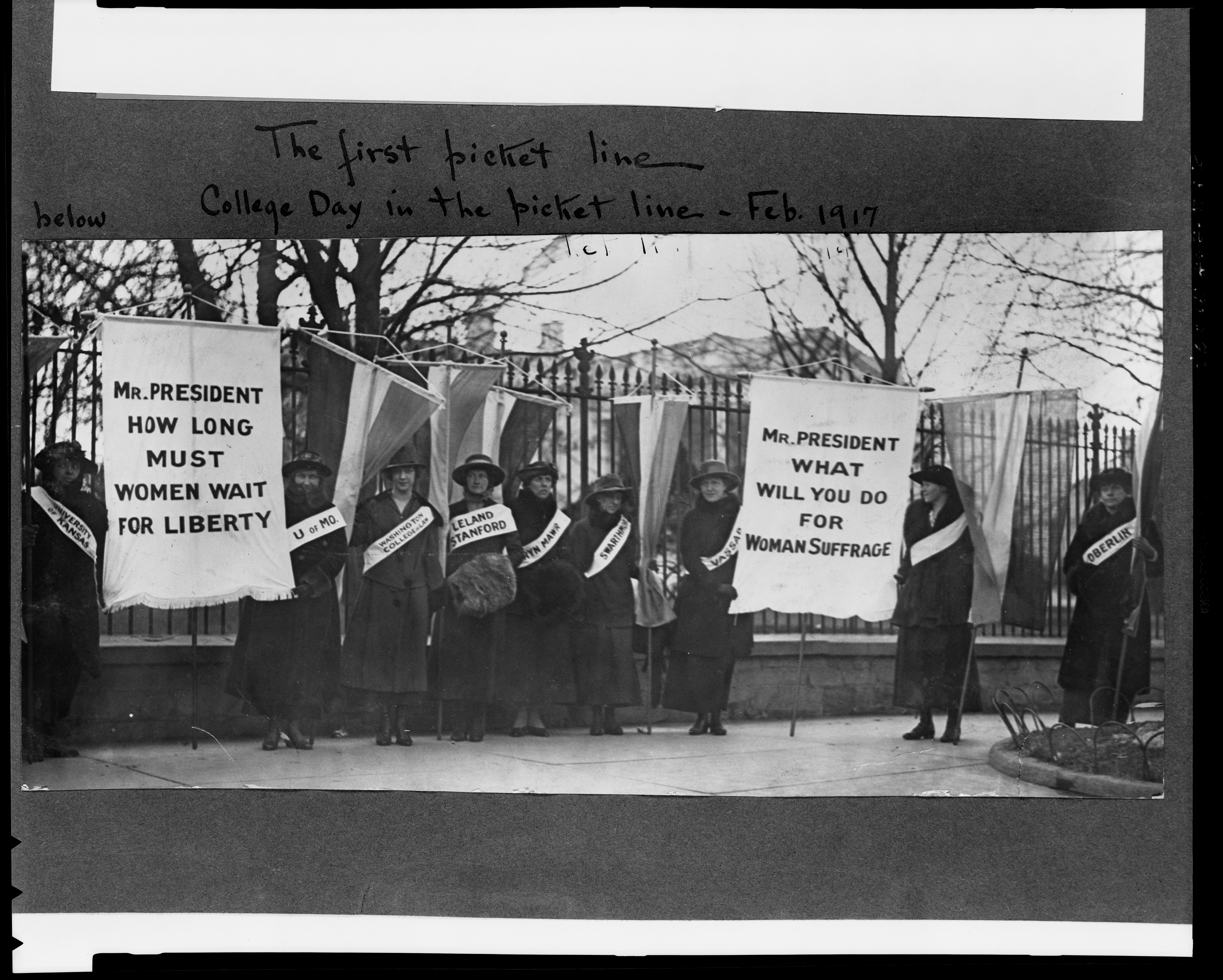
Silent Sentinels, suffragists picket President Woodrow Wilson in the White House

== Background ==
Doris Stevens was born in 1888 in Omaha, Nebraska to a pastor father and an immigrant mother from Holland . She attended Omaha High School and later Oberlin College. At Oberlin College she became involved in women's suffrage and became actively involved in advocating for women's legal rights. After graduating, she moved to Washington, D.C., and joined NAWSA as a regional organizer.

She wrote Jailed for Freedom, which was a firsthand account of her involvement with the more militant National Woman's Party and their fight for suffrage, published in 1920. It follows the story of women's suffrage and the repercussions of fighting for one's rights. Jailed for Freedom discusses how women picketing the White House were jailed and depicts the political and social tensions of that time. Stevens shares accounts of beatings, police brutality, and cruelty faced by women protesters, as well as the injustice faced by women in prison for standing up for their rights. Stevens was an organizer and a devout participant in the Silent Sentinels, protests which began in January 1917 outside of the White House, urging President Woodrow Wilson to pass the 19th Amendment. It was during these peaceful protests that Stevens and other suffragist women were arrested and jailed for their involvement.

Stevens dedicated Jailed for Freedom to Alice Paul, another leader of the National Woman's Party who was jailed alongside Stevens during the Silent Sentinels. The book has three parts. Part 1 is titled "Leadership" and illustrates the work of Susan B. Anthony and Alice Paul. Part 2 is titled "Political Action" and talks about women organizing to protest the capital and President Woodrow Wilson to gain the right of suffrage. Part 3 is titled "Militancy" and talks about the violent, cruel backlash these women faced from authorities and in jail. It highlights the fight the women gave the capitol and how they finally succeeded in passing the 19th Amendment.

== Part 1 ==
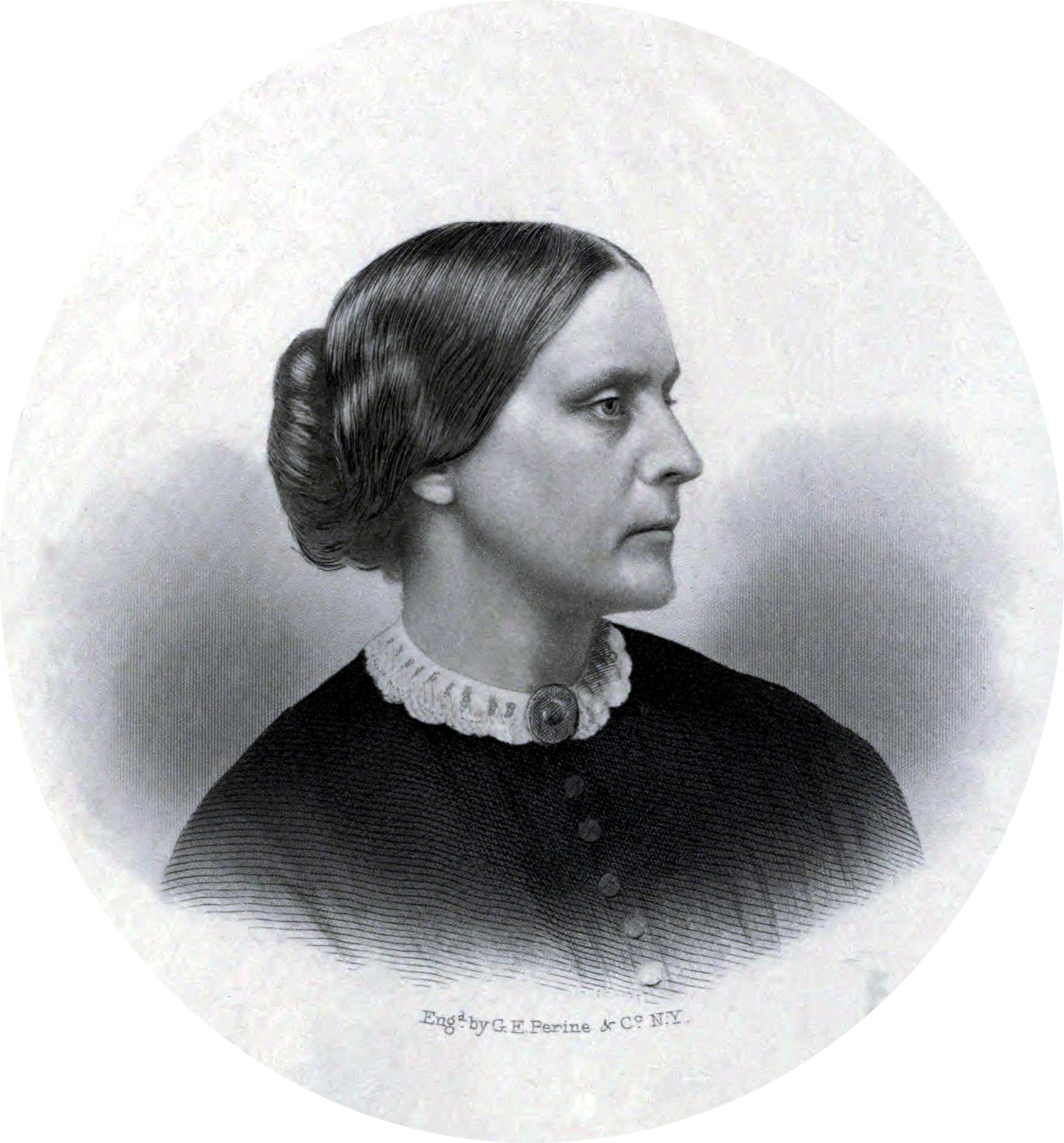
Susan B. Anthony (1820-1906), the first women's suffrage leader Stevens praises in Jailed for Freedom

Stevens begins her account praising one of the main founders of NAWSA, Susan B. Anthony. She praises Anthony as a hero, who led women in dramatic militant protests, forcing the public to notice the injustices women were facing. Stevens recounts a time when Susan B. Anthony refused to conform to patriarchal societies' laws, by actually breaking the law. Anthony illegally voted in a presidential election in 1872. She was brought to trial and charged a fine of $100 for her crime which she refused to pay. Stevens and NAWSA later use this tactic of relentless determination to refuse bail and serve time in the Occoquan Workhouse. When Susan B. Anthony died in 1906, Stevens recounts that the militant movement died with her.

The revival of the militant movement was sparked with Alice Paul, a quaker who joined NAWSA in 1912. Stevens worked closely with Alice Paul whom she described as quiet, but having a fierce determination like Susan B. Anthony. Stevens recounts how Alice Paul had a quality to her which allowed her to recruit women and men to the Suffrage Movement without an argument. She could win arguments without saying a single word and compelled confidence and self-respect in women. She was the perfect leader as she was extremely calm and knew everything that was coming before it did. Alice Paul, one of the leaders of the Silent Sentinels, got the 19th Amendment passed in 1919.

== Part 2 ==
In March 1913, before the inauguration of Woodrow Wilson, women led by Alice Paul and Lucy Burns paraded in front of the Capital. It was a demonstration of how many women wanted the vote, organized by NWP and NAWSA. This Women's March did not receive enough police protection. Women got beaten up and harassed by large crowds of the public who were against suffrage. This made headlines and was bad press for police chiefs and the government which refused to protect women.

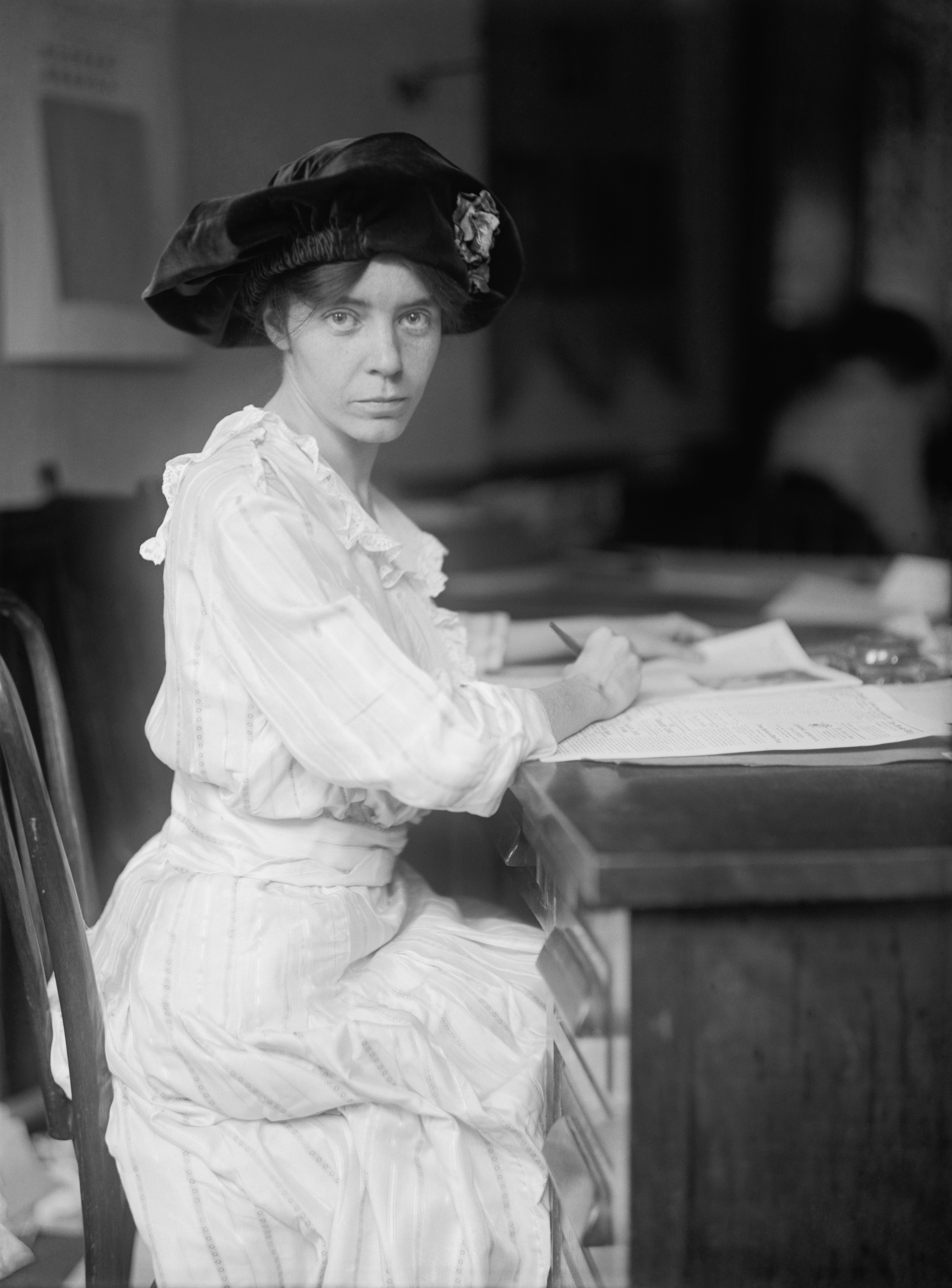
Alice Paul (1885-1977), the second woman's suffrage leader Stevens praises in Jailed for Freedom

After this, Paul and four other women addressed President Wilson personally in a private conference asking, "Mr. President, do you not see you can't address tariffs without asking women?" This was a direct reference to taxation without representation. The women are using the government's own goal of promoting democracy outside of the United States to address democracy in the United States. Alice and Paul and the women are asking how President Wilson can be fighting for Democracy abroad when there is no democracy in the United States. President Wilson promised to consider this issue. He said he had never considered suffrage before. The women's huge demonstrations were all met warmly by the President until the Silent Sentinels. Twenty-two senators were in favor of women's suffrage and three were against. Women argued that Filipino men get self government before women under Wilson, although he promised to consider women again and again. The women led by Alice Paul and NWP went to congress, lobbied, petitioned, and raised tons of money because now suffrage became a national issue. When the President said the states should decide women's suffrage, Alice Paul decided to begin the Silent Sentinel protests.

The Silent Sentinels resulted in the imprisonment of over 200 suffragists. Led by Alice Paul and the National Woman's Party, women appeared every day at the gates of the White House from the months of June to November to picket the president, Woodrow Wilson, for his lack of action towards the suffragist cause. The woman used the US involvement in World War I as fuel for their cause, calling Wilson a hypocrite for fighting for 'liberty abroad' while denying it to women at home. They bore signs with messages like the following:

"How long must women wait for liberty?"

"Tell the president that he cannot fight against liberty at home while he tells us to fight for liberty abroad."

"Tell him to make America safe for democracy before he asks the mothers of America to throw their sons to the support of democracy in Europe."

"Ask him how he can refuse liberty to American citizens when he is forcing millions of American boys out of their country to die for liberty."

Their signs were not well received. Army and Navy boys, furious that the women would picket a wartime president, knocked women to the ground and ripped the purple and gold suffrage sashes from their bodies, some tearing the women's blouses off in their frenzy. The women (six in total) were taken from the White House and sentenced to 30 days in the Occoquan workhouse. Conditions at the Occoquan workhouse were brutal. Upon arrival, the women were stripped naked, sprayed down with water and forced to change into prison suits. Women were given no way to contact their families—not even their closest relative. They were permitted three showers a week with the same bar of soap shared amongst all prisoners. They were fed a diet of half cooked vegetables, rice, sour cornbread and "rancid soup with worms in it". If they refused to eat, the women were beaten until their blood had to be scrubbed from their clothes and the floor. Continued hunger strike resulted women in being force-fed through feeding tubes, that were forced down their noses, leaving them bloody. Officers at the workhouse were so brutal that they sometimes even ordered the African American prisoners to attack the white prisoners. As news got out of the terrible conditions that American women were enduring, the public was horrified.

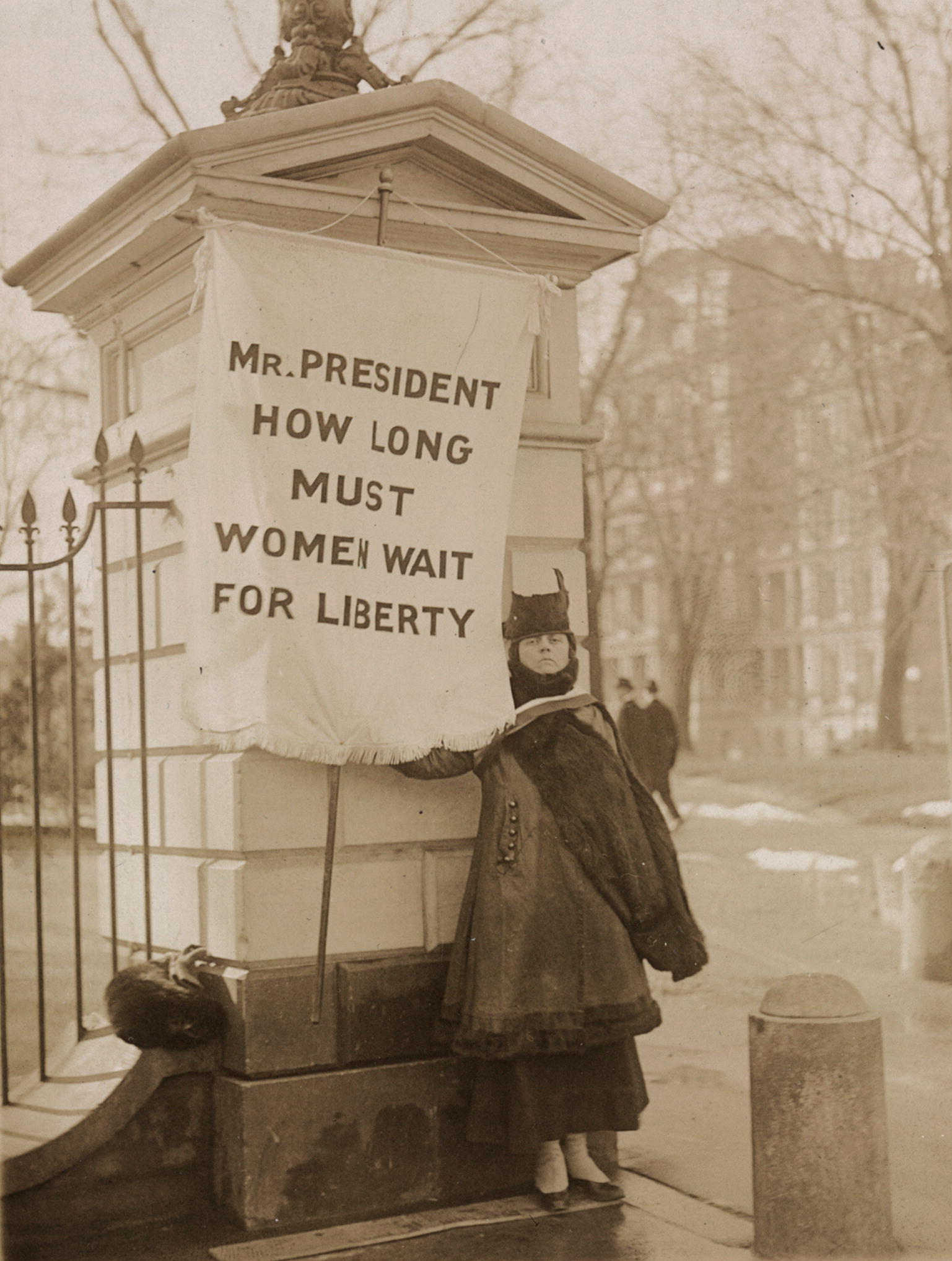
Suffragist Alison Turnbull picketing the White House

In July 1917, a good friend and confidant of President Wilson, Dudley Field Malone, wrote a letter to Wilson protesting the Administration's handling of the "suffrage question". He urged Wilson to sign a federal bill on suffrage, claiming that it would give him the support from thousands of women on the war for international justice, World War I. Two months later, Wilson remained inactive on the issue and Malone resigned from office on the account that he could "no longer be a part of an administration that sent American women to disgusting prisons for demanding suffrage". The resignation came as a shock to the American people. Malone received letters of praise from suffragists for his statements in his letter of resignation, such as Alice Stone Blackwell (daughter of Lucy Stone), and Carrie Chapman Catt. However, the arrests of women for picketing continued.

== Part 3 ==
The third part of the book focuses on militancy, or what Stevens noted was the name given by many to "dramatic acts of protest", arguing in the preface: "[M]ilitancy is as much a state of mind, an approach to a task, as it is the commission of deeds of protest. It is the state of mind of those who in their fiery idealism do not lose sight of the real springs of human action." In the 27 chapters of Part Three, Stevens continues to describe picketing the White House, in addition to the legal repercussions of doing so throughout 1917.

In the time leading up to the first arrests, the suffragettes picketing the White House specifically protested the decision of the Wilson administration to focus solely on "wartime measures."... Stevens believed that the Wilson Administration was left only two choices by the picketers: "It must yield to this pressure from the people or it mist suppress the agitation which was causing such interest. It must pass the amendment or remove the troublesome pickets." Choosing to get rid of the picketers, the Administration had the police department warn the National Women's Party, before arresting Lucy Burns and Katherine Morey at the next protest. Starting in June 1917, and continuing throughout that year, more suffragettes were arrested each week on the charges of obstructing traffic.

Unwilling to admit any guilt by paying a fine, most of the arrested picketers were place in the Occoquan Workhouse. Here, many women, including Alice Paul and Lucy Burns, protested their sentence, and the poor conditions of the facility by going on hunger strike. In addition to using this physical protest as a political weapon, the women defended themselves in court. They pleaded not guilty to the charges of obstructing traffic. Their main lawyers were Dudley Field Malone (who later becomes Steven's husband) and Mr. J. A. H. Hopkins. Eventually, the women were successful, and the charges of obstructing traffic were dropped. Stevens develops and illustrates the unclean and abusive experience of the Occoquan Workhouse throughout Part 3.

Following the release of the prisoners, there was a large amount of public support for the movement, and enough pressure of President Wilson to convince him to set a date for Congress to vote on the 19th Amendment. The rest of Part 3 continues to illustrate the results that came around after the picketing, prison time, and hunger strikes. Stevens follows the passing of the 19th Amendment, and the follow-up amendment proposal that followed: the Equal Rights Amendment.

== Legacy ==
Shaina Taub began developing the show Suffs in the early 2010s, after she read Jailed for Freedom.
