= Drama Desk Award for Outstanding Music =

- Awarded for: Outstanding Music
- Location: New York City
- Country: United States
- Presented by: Drama Desk
- First award: 1968
- Currently held by: Will Aronson and Hue Park for Maybe Happy Ending (2025)
- Website: dramadesk.org (defunct)

The Drama Desk Award for Outstanding Music is an annual award presented by Drama Desk in recognition of achievements in musical theatre (distinct from incidental music in plays) across collective Broadway, off-Broadway and off-off-Broadway productions in New York City. The award was originally entitled Best Composer, before being renamed to its current title in 1969. The award is often referred to as Outstanding Score of a Musical.

== Winners and nominees ==
=== 1960s ===
Year	Composer	Production
1968
1968	Al Carmines	In Circles
1968	Galt MacDermot	Hair
1969
1969	Al Carmines	Peace
1969	Burt Bacharach	Promises, Promises

=== 1970s ===
Year	Composer	Production
1970
1970	Stephen Sondheim	Company
1970	Kurt Weill	Mahagonny
1971
1971	Stephen Sondheim	Follies
1972
1972	Galt MacDermot	Two Gentlemen of Verona
1973
1973	Stephen Sondheim	A Little Night Music
1974
1974	Al Carmines	The Faggot
1975
1975	Charlie Smalls	The Wiz
1975	Gene Curty, Nitra Scharfman & Chuck Strand	The Lieutenant
1975	Jerry Herman	Mack and Mabel
1975	Fred Silver	In Gay Company
1976
1976	Marvin Hamlisch	A Chorus Line
1976	Leonard Bernstein	1600 Pennsylvania Avenue
1976	Bill Heyer & Hank Beebe	Tuscaloosa's Calling Me
1976	Stephen Sondheim	Pacific Overtures
1977
1977	Cy Coleman	I Love My Wife
1977	Charles Strouse	Annie
1977	Elizabeth Swados	Nightclub Cantata
1977	Robert Waldman	The Robber Bridegroom
1978
1978	Cy Coleman	On the Twentieth Century
1978	Carol Hall	The Best Little Whorehouse in Texas
1978	Elizabeth Swados	Runaways
1979
1979	Stephen Sondheim	Sweeney Todd: The Demon Barber of Fleet Street
1979	Nancy Ford	I'm Getting My Act Together and Taking It on the Road
1979	Marvin Hamlisch & Neil Simon	They're Playing Our Song
1979	Jerome Kass	Ballroom
1979	Michel Legrand	The Umbrellas of Cherbourg

=== 1980s ===
Year	Composer	Production
1980
1980	Andrew Lloyd Webber	Evita
1980	Cy Coleman	Barnum
1980	Elizabeth Swados	Runaways
1981	—N/a	
1982
1982	Maury Yeston	Nine
1982	Stephen Sondheim	Merrily We Roll Along
1982	Jim Wann	Pump Boys and Dinettes
1983
1983	Andrew Lloyd Webber	Cats
1983	Larry Grossman	A Doll's Life
1983	Gerald Jay Markee	Charlotte Sweet
1983	Des McAnuff	Death of Von Richthofen
1983	Alan Menken	Little Shop of Horrors
1984
1984	Jerry Herman	La Cage aux Folles
1984	Galt MacDermot	The Human Comedy
1984	David Shire	Baby
1984	Stephen Sondheim	Sunday in the Park with George
1985
1985	Larry Grossman	Grind
1985	Roger Miller	Big River
1985	Michael Rupert	3 Guys Naked from the Waist Down
1986
1986	Rupert Holmes	The Mystery of Edwin Drood
1986	Polly Pen	Goblin Market
1986	Charles Strouse	Mayor
1986	Andrew Lloyd Webber	Song and Dance
1987
1987	Noel Gay	Me and My Girl
1987	Claude-Michel Schönberg	Les Misérables
1987	Nick Bicat	The Knife
1987	Charles Strouse	Rags
1987	Andrew Lloyd Webber	Starlight Express
1988
1988	Andrew Lloyd Webber	Phantom of the Opera
1988	Benny Andersson & Björn Ulvaeus	Chess
1988	David Evans	Birds of Paradise
1988	Hugh Masekela & Mbongeni Ngema	Sarafina!
1988	Stephen Sondheim	Into the Woods
1989	—N/a	

=== 1990s ===
Year	Composer	Production
1990
1990	Cy Coleman	City of Angels
1990	Chet Forrest, Bob Wright & Maury Yeston	Grand Hotel
1990	Ástor Piazzolla	Dangerous Games
1990	David Shire	Closer Than Ever
1990	Andrew Lloyd Webber	Aspects of Love
1991
1991	Cy Coleman	The Will Rogers Follies
1991	David Bucknam	The Waves
1991	William Finn	Falsettoland
1991	Lucy Simon	The Secret Garden
1991	Stephen Sondheim	Assassins
1992
1992	Erik Frandsen, Michael Garin, Robert Hipkins & Paul Lockheart	Song of Singapore
1993
1993	Marvin Hamlisch	The Goodbye Girl
1993	John Kander	Kiss of the Spider Woman
1993	Jeffrey Lunden	Wings
1994
1994	Stephen Sondheim	Passion
1994	Michael John LaChiusa	Hello Again
1994	Alan Menken	Beauty and the Beast
1994	Polly Pen	Christina Alberta's Father
1994	Tom Waits	The Black Rider
1995	—N/a	
1996
1996	Jonathan Larson	Rent
1996	Adam Guettel	Floyd Collins
1996	Stephen Hoffman	Splendora
1996	Polly Pen	Bed and Sofa
1996	David Shire	Big
1996	Bob Telson & Michael John LaChiusa	Chronicle of a Death Foretold
1997
1997	Cy Coleman	The Life
1997	John Kander	Steel Pier
1997	Jeanine Tesori	Violet
1998
1998	Stephen Flaherty	Ragtime
1998	Paul Simon	The Capeman
1998	Stephen Trask	Hedwig and the Angry Inch
1998	Frank Wildhorn	The Scarlet Pimpernel
1999
1999	Jason Robert Brown	Parade
1999	Cy Coleman	Exactly Like You
1999	William Finn	A New Brain
1999	Frank Wildhorn	The Civil War

=== 2000s ===
Year	Composer	Production
2000
2000	Andrew Lippa	The Wild Party
2000	Shaun Davey	James Joyce's The Dead
2000	Stephen Sondheim	Saturday Night
2001
2001	David Yazbek	The Full Monty
2001	Kirsten Childs	The Bubbly Black Girl Sheds Her Chameleon Skin
2001	Stephen Flaherty	Seussical
2001	Mark Hollmann	Urinetown
2001	Ed Kleban	A Class Act
2001	Laurence O'Keefe	Bat Boy: The Musical
2002
2002	Jason Robert Brown	The Last Five Years
2002	Marvin Hamlisch	Sweet Smell of Success
2002	Jonathan Larson	Tick, Tick... BOOM!
2002	Jeanine Tesori	Thoroughly Modern Millie
2003
2003	Marc Shaiman	Hairspray
2003	Tim Acito	Zanna, Don't!
2003	Stephen Flaherty	A Man of No Importance
2003	Michel Legrand	Amour
2003	Robert Lopez & Jeff Marx	Avenue Q
2003	Anderson Edwards, Keith Glover & Keb' Mo'	Thunder Knocking on the Door
2004
2004	Jeanine Tesori	Caroline, or Change
2004	RaRa Avis & Andrew Yeater	Ramayana 2K3
2004	Boy George	Taboo
2004	Eric Rockwell	The Musical of Musicals (The Musical!)
2004	Stephen Schwartz	Wicked
2004	Martin Silvestri & Joel Higgins	Johnny Guitar
2005
2005	Adam Guettel	The Light in the Piazza
2005	Gary Adler & Michael Patrick Walker	Altar Boyz
2005	Terry Davies	Play Without Words
2005	William Finn	The 25th Annual Putnam County Spelling Bee
2005	Stephen Flaherty	Dessa Rose
2005	David Yazbek	Dirty Rotten Scoundrels
2006
2006	Lisa Lambert & Greg Morrison	The Drowsy Chaperone
2006	Stephen Dolginoff	Thrill Me
2006	Scott Frankel	Grey Gardens
2006	Michael John LaChiusa	See What I Wanna See
2006	Peter Mills	The Pursuit of Persephone
2006	Matthew Sklar	The Wedding Singer
2007
2007	Duncan Sheik	Spring Awakening
2007	John Kander	Curtains
2007	Paul Leschen & Gila Sand	Twist: Please, Sir, May I Have Some More?
2007	Peter Rodgers Melnick	Adrift in Macao
2007	Lin-Manuel Miranda	In the Heights
2007	Laurence O'Keefe & Nell Benjamin	Legally Blonde
2008
2008	Heidi Rodewald & Stew	Passing Strange
2008	John Bucchino	A Catered Affair
2008	Stephen Flaherty	The Glorious Ones
2008	Tom Kitt	Next to Normal
2008	Mark Mulcahy	The Slug Bearers of Kayrol Island
2008	Joshua Schmidt	Adding Machine
2009
2009	Elton John	Billy Elliot the Musical
2009	Neil Bartram	The Story of My Life
2009	Zina Goldrich	Dear Edwina
2009	Dolly Parton	9 to 5
2009	Stephen Sondheim	Road Show
2009	Jeanine Tesori	Shrek the Musical

=== 2010s ===
Year	Composer	Production
2010
2010	David Bryan	Memphis
2010	Michael Friedman	Bloody Bloody Andrew Jackson
2010	Joe Iconis	Bloodsong of Love
2010	John Kander & Fred Ebb	The Scottsboro Boys
2010	Andrew Lippa	The Addams Family
2010	Joseph Zellnik	Yank!
2011
2011	Trey Parker, Robert Lopez & Matt Stone	The Book of Mormon
2011	Brad Alexander	See Rock City & Other Destinations
2011	Alan Menken	Sister Act
2011	Marc Shaiman	Catch Me If You Can
2011	Mike Stoller & Artie Butler	The People in the Picture
2011	David Yazbek	Women on the Verge of a Nervous Breakdown
2012
2012	Alan Menken	Newsies
2012	Glen Hansard & Markéta Irglová	Once
2012	Michael John LaChiusa	Queen of the Mist
2012	Alan Menken	Leap of Faith
2012	Frank Wildhorn	Bonnie & Clyde
2012	Maury Yeston	Death Takes a Holiday
2013
2013	David Byrne & Fatboy Slim	Here Lies Love
2013	Trey Anastasio & Amanda Green	Hands on a Hardbody
2013	Michael John LaChiusa	Giant
2013	Dave Malloy	Natasha, Pierre and the Great Comet of 1812
2013	Benj Pasek & Justin Paul	A Christmas Story: The Musical
2013	David Rossmer & Steve Rosen	The Other Josh Cohen
2014
2014	Jason Robert Brown	The Bridges of Madison County
2014	Andrew Lippa	Big Fish
2014	Steven Lutvak	A Gentleman's Guide to Love and Murder
2014	Alan Menken	Aladdin
2014	Kevin Murphy & Laurence O'Keefe	Heathers: The Musical
2014	Jeanine Tesori	Fun Home
2015
2015	Lin-Manuel Miranda	Hamilton
2015	Jason Robert Brown	Honeymoon in Vegas
2015	Michael Friedman	The Fortress of Solitude
2015	John Kander	The Visit
2015	Dave Malloy	Ghost Quartet
2015	Sting	The Last Ship
2016
2016	Steve Martin & Edie Brickell	Bright Star
2016	Sara Bareilles	Waitress
2016	Michael John LaChiusa	First Daughter Suite
2016	Andrew Lloyd Webber	School of Rock
2016	The Lobbyists	SeaWife
2017
2017	David Yazbek	The Band's Visit
2017	Stephen Flaherty	Anastasia
2017	Dave Malloy	Beardo
2017	Richard Oberacker	Bandstand
2017	Irene Sankoff & David Hein	Come from Away
2018
2018	David Friedman	Desperate Measures
2018	The Bengsons	The Lucky Ones
2018	Ben Caplan & Christian Barry	Old Stock: A Refugee Love Story
2018	Erin McKeown	Miss You Like Hell
2018	Helen Park & Max Vernon	KPOP
2019
2019	David Yazbek	Tootsie
2019	Andrew R. Butler	Rags Parkland Sings the Songs of the Future
2019	Joe Iconis	Be More Chill
2019	Peter Mills	The Hello Girls
2019	Mark Sonnenblick	Midnight at the Never Get
2019	Shaina Taub	Twelfth Night

=== 2020s ===
Year	Composer	Production
2020
2020	Dave Malloy	Octet
2020	Ross Golan	The Wrong Man
2020	Michael R. Jackson	A Strange Loop
2020	Joshua Rosenblum	Einstein's Dreams
2020	Duncan Sheik	The Secret Life of Bees
2020	Jeanine Tesori	Soft Power
2021	No awards: New York theatres shuttered, March 2020 to September 2021, due to the COVID-19 pandemic in New York City	
2022		
2022	Toby Marlow and Lucy Moss	Six
2022	Jason Howland	Paradise Square
2022	Matt Ray	The Hang
2022	Carrie Rodriguez	¡Americano!
2022	Jeanine Tesori	Kimberly Akimbo
2023
2023	Brandy Clark and Shane McAnally	Shucked
2023	Michael R. Jackson	White Girl in Danger
2023	Tom Kitt and AnnMarie Milazzo	Almost Famous
2023	Elyssa Samsel and Kate Anderson	Between the Lines
2023	The Kilbanes	Weightless
2024	Shaina Taub	Suffs
2024	Jason Robert Brown	The Connector
2024	Justin Huertas	Lizard Boy: The Musical
2024	Jamestown Revival (Jonathan Clay and Zach Chance) and Justin Levine	The Outsiders
2024	David Yazbek and Erik Della Penna	Dead Outlaw
2025
2025	Will Aronson	Maybe Happy Ending
2025	David Foster	Boop! The Musical
2025	Joy Huerta and Benjamin Velez	Real Women Have Curves
2025	Zoe Sarnak	The Lonely Few
2025	The Lazours	We Live in Cairo

== Multiple wins ==
5 wins

- Cy Coleman
- Stephen Sondheim

3 wins

- Al Carmines
- Jason Robert Brown
- Andrew Lloyd Webber
- David Yazbek

2 wins

- Marvin Hamlisch

== Multiple nominations ==
12 nominations

- Stephen Sondheim

7 nominations

- Andrew Lloyd Webber
- Jeanine Tesori

6 nominations

- Cy Coleman
- Stephen Flaherty
- Michael John LaChiusa
- Alan Menken
- David Yazbek

5 nominations

- Jason Robert Brown
- John Kander

4 nominations

- Dave Malloy

3 nominations

- Marvin Hamlisch
- Andrew Lippa
- Laurence O'Keefe
- Polly Pen
- David Shire
- Charles Strouse
- Elizabeth Swados
- Maury Yeston
- Frank Wildhorn

2 nominations

- Al Carmines
- William Finn
- Michael Friedman
- Larry Grossman
- Adam Guettel
- Jerry Herman
- Joe Iconis
- Michael R. Jackson
- Tom Kitt
- Jonathan Larson
- Michel Legrand
- Robert Lopez
- Galt MacDermot
- Peter Mills
- Lin-Manuel Miranda
- Marc Shaiman
- Duncan Sheik
- Shaina Taub

== See also ==
- Tony Award for Best Original Score
