= Drama Desk Award for Outstanding Musical =

Annual theatre award in New York City

- Awarded for: Outstanding Musical
- Location: New York City
- Country: United States
- Presented by: Drama Desk
- First award: 1975
- Currently held by: Maybe Happy Ending (2025)
- Website: dramadesk.org

The Drama Desk Award for Outstanding Musical is an annual award presented by Drama Desk in recognition of achievements in theatre across collective Broadway, off-Broadway and off-off-Broadway productions in New York City.

== Winners and nominees ==
=== 1970s ===
Year	Musical	Book	Music	Lyrics
1975
1975	The Wiz	William F. Brown	Charlie Smalls	
1975	Goodtime Charley	Sidney Michaels	Larry Grossman	Hal Hackady
1975	In Gay Company	Fred Silver		
1975	The Lieutenant	Gene Curty, Nitra Scharfman and Chuck Strand		
1976
1976	A Chorus Line	James Kirkwood	Marvin Hamlisch	Edward Kleban
1976	Pacific Overtures	John Weidman	Stephen Sondheim	
1976	The Robber Bridegroom	Alfred Uhry	Robert Waldman	Alfred Uhry
1977
1977	Annie	Thomas Meehan	Charles Strouse	Martin Charnin
1977	Happy End	Elisabeth Hauptmann	Kurt Weill	Bertolt Brecht
1977	I Love My Wife	Michael Stewart	Cy Coleman	Michael Stewart
1977	The King and I	Oscar Hammerstein II	Richard Rodgers	Oscar Hammerstein II
1977	Porgy and Bess	DuBose Heyward	George Gershwin	DuBose Heyward and Ira Gershwin
1977	The Robber Bridegroom	Alfred Uhry	Robert Waldman	Alfred Uhry
1978
1978	Ain't Misbehavin'	N/A	Thomas "Fats" Waller	Various
1978	The Best Little Whorehouse in Texas	Larry L. King and Peter Masterson	Carol Hall	
1978	Dancin'	—N/a	Various	
1978	Runaways	Elizabeth Swados		
1978	Working	Stephen Schwartz and Nina Faso	Various	
1979
1979	Sweeney Todd	Hugh Wheeler	Stephen Sondheim	
1979	Eubie!	—N/a	Eubie Blake	Various
1979	They're Playing Our Song	Neil Simon	Marvin Hamlisch	Carole Bayer Sager
1979	The Umbrellas of Cherbourg	Jacques Demy	Michel Legrand	Sheldon Harnick

=== 1980s ===
Year	Musical	Book	Music	Lyrics
1980
1980	Evita	Tim Rice	Andrew Lloyd Webber	Tim Rice
1980	The 1940's Radio Hour	Walton Jones	Various	
1980	Barnum	Mark Bramble	Cy Coleman	Michael Stewart
1980	Sidewalkin'	Jake Holmes		
1980	Tintypes	Mel Marvin and Gary Pearle	Various	
1981
1981	The Pirates of Penzance	W. S. Gilbert	Arthur Sullivan	W. S. Gilbert
1981	42nd Street	Michael Stewart and Mark Bramble	Harry Warren	Al Dubin
1981	Lena Horne: The Lady and Her Music	—N/a	Various	
1982
1982	Nine	Arthur Kopit	Maury Yeston	
1982	Dreamgirls	Tom Eyen	Henry Krieger	Tom Eyen
1982	Joseph and the Amazing Technicolor Dreamcoat	Tim Rice	Andrew Lloyd Webber	Tim Rice
1982	Pump Boys and Dinettes	Pump Boys and Dinettes		
1983
1983	Little Shop of Horrors	Howard Ashman	Alan Menken	Howard Ashman
1983	My One and Only	Peter Stone and Timothy S. Mayer	George Gershwin	Ira Gershwin
1984
1984	Sunday in the Park with George	James Lapine	Stephen Sondheim	
1984	Baby	Sybille Pearson	David Shire	Richard Maltby, Jr.
1984	The Rink	Terrence McNally	John Kander	Fred Ebb
1984	Taking My Turn	Robert H. Livingston	Gary William Friedman	Will Holt
1985
1985	—N/a			
1986
1986	The Mystery of Edwin Drood	Rupert Holmes		
1986	Big Deal	Bob Fosse	Various	
1986	Goblin Market	Polly Pen and Peggy Harmon	Polly Pen	Polly Pen and Peggy Harmon
1986	Personals	Alan Merken	Stephen Schwartz	Alan Merken
1987
1987	Les Misérables	Claude-Michel Schönberg and Alain Boublil	Claude-Michel Schönberg	Herbert Kretzmer
1987	Me and My Girl	L. Arthur Rose and Douglas Furber	Noel Gay	L. Arthur Rose and Douglas Furber
1987	Olympus on My Mind	Barry Harman	Grant Sturiale	Barry Harman
1987	Starlight Express	—N/a	Andrew Lloyd Webber	Richard Stilgoe
1988
1988	Into the Woods	James Lapine	Stephen Sondheim	
1988	The Phantom of the Opera	Richard Stilgoe and Andrew Lloyd Webber	Andrew Lloyd Webber	Charles Hart
1989
1989	Jerome Robbins' Broadway	N/A	Various	
1989	Black and Blue	Claudio Segovia and Héctor Orezzoli	Various	

=== 1990s ===
Year	Musical	Book	Music	Lyrics
1990
1990	City of Angels	Larry Gelbart	Cy Coleman	David Zippel
1990	Aspects of Love	Andrew Lloyd Webber		Don Black and Charles Hart
1991
1991	The Will Rogers Follies	Peter Stone	Cy Coleman	Betty Comden and Adolph Green
1991	Assassins	John Weidman	Stephen Sondheim	
1991	The Secret Garden	Marsha Norman	Lucy Simon	Marsha Norman
1992
1992	Crazy for You	Ken Ludwig	George Gershwin	Ira Gershwin
1992	Jelly's Last Jam	George C. Wolfe	Jelly Roll Morton	Susan Birkenhead
1993
1993	Kiss of the Spider Woman	Terrence McNally	John Kander	Fred Ebb
1993	Ruthless!	Joel Paley	Marvin Laird	Joel Paley
1993	The Who's Tommy	Pete Townshend and Des McAnuff	Pete Townshend	
1993	Wings	Arthur Perlman	Jeffrey Lunden	Arthur Perlman
1994
1994	Passion	James Lapine	Stephen Sondheim	
1994	Beauty and the Beast	Linda Woolverton	Alan Menken	Howard Ashman and Tim Rice
1994	Hello Again	Michael John LaChiusa		
1995
1995	Show Boat	Oscar Hammerstein II	Jerome Kern	Oscar Hammerstein II and P.G. Wodehouse
1995	A Christmas Carol	—N/a	Alan Menken	Lynn Ahrens
1995	How to Succeed in Business Without; Really Trying	Abe Burrows, Jack Weinstock and Willie Gilbert	Frank Loesser	
1995	Merrily We Roll Along	George Furth	Stephen Sondheim	
1995	Sunset Boulevard	Christopher Hampton and Don Black	Andrew Lloyd Webber	Don Black
1996
1996	Rent	Jonathan Larson		
1996	Bed and Sofa	Laurence Klavan	Polly Pen	Laurence Klavan
1996	Big: the musical	John Weidman	David Shire	Richard Maltby, Jr.
1996	Bring in 'da Noise, Bring in 'da Funk	Reg E. Gaines	Daryl Waters, Zane Mark and Ann Duquesnay	Reg E. Gaines, George C. Wolfe and Ann Duquesnay
1996	Chronicle of a Death Foretold	Graciela Daniele and Jim Lewis	Bob Telson	Graciela Daniele, Jim Lewis and Michael John LaChiusa
1996	Floyd Collins	Tina Landau	Adam Guettel	
1997
1997	The Life	Cy Coleman, David Newman and Ira Gasman	Cy Coleman	Ira Gasman
1997	Steel Pier	David Thompson	John Kander	Fred Ebb
1997	Violet	Brian Crawley	Jeanine Tesori	Brian Crawley
1998
1998	Ragtime	Terrence McNally	Stephen Flaherty	Lynn Ahrens
1998	Forever Tango	—N/a	Various	
1998	Hedwig and the Angry Inch	John Cameron Mitchell	Stephen Trask	
1998	High Society	Arthur Kopit	Cole Porter	Cole Porter and Susan Birkenhead
1998	The Lion King	Roger Allers and Irene Mecchi	Elton John	Tim Rice
1999
1999	Parade	Alfred Uhry	Jason Robert Brown	
1999	A New Brain	William Finn and James Lapine	William Finn	
1999	The Civil War	Gregory Boyd and Frank Wildhorn	Frank Wildhorn	Jack Murphy

=== 2000s ===
Year	Musical	Book	Music	Lyrics
2000
2000	Contact	John Weidman	Various	
2000	James Joyce's The Dead	Richard Nelson	Shaun Davey	Richard Nelson and Shaun Davey
2000	Saturday Night	Julius J. Epstein and Philip G. Epstein	Stephen Sondheim	
2000	Swing!	Paul Kelley	Various	
2000	The Wild Party	Andrew Lippa		
2001
2001	The Producers	Mel Brooks and Thomas Meehan	Mel Brooks	
2001	Bat Boy: The Musical	Keythe Farley and Brian Flemming	Laurence O'Keefe	
2001	Bubbly Black Girl Sheds Her; Chameleon Skin	Kristen Childs		
2001	The Full Monty	Terrence McNally	David Yazbek	
2001	Urinetown	Greg Kotis	Mark Hollman	Greg Kotis and Mark Hollman
2002
2002	Thoroughly Modern Millie	Richard Morris and Dick Scanlan	Jeanine Tesori	Dick Scanlan
2002	The Last Five Years	Jason Robert Brown		
2002	Sweet Smell of Success	John Guare	Marvin Hamlisch	Craig Carnelia
2002	Tick, Tick... BOOM!	Jonathan Larson and David Auburn	Jonathan Larson	
2003
2003	Hairspray	Mark O'Donnell and Thomas Meehan	Marc Shaiman	Scott Wittman and Marc Shaiman
2003	A Man of No Importance	Terrence McNally	Stephen Flaherty	Lynn Ahrens
2003	Amour	Didier Van Cauwelaert and Jeremy Sams	Michel Legrand	Jeremy Sams
2003	Avenue Q	Jeff Whitty	Robert Lopez and Jeff Marx	
2003	Movin' Out	Twyla Tharp	Billy Joel	
2003	Zanna, Don't!	Tim Acito and Alexander Dinelaris	Tim Acito	Tim Acito and Alexander Dinelaris
2004
2004	Wicked	Winnie Holzman	Stephen Schwartz	
2004	Caroline, or Change	Tony Kushner	Jeanine Tesori	Tony Kushner
2004	Johnny Guitar	Nicholas van Hoogstraten	Martin Silvestri and Joel Higgins	Joel Higgins
2004	The Musical of Musicals	Joanne Bogart and Eric Rockwell	Eric Rockwell	Joanne Bogart
2005
2005	Monty Python's Spamalot	Eric Idle	John Du Prez and Eric Idle	Eric Idle
2005	The 25th Annual Putnam County; Spelling Bee	Rachel Sheinkin	William Finn	
2005	Altar Boyz	Kevin Del Aguila	Gary Adler and Michael Patrick Walker	
2005	Dirty Rotten Scoundrels	Jeffrey Lane	David Yazbek	
2005	The Light in the Piazza	Craig Lucas	Adam Guettel	
2006
2006	The Drowsy Chaperone	Bob Martin and Don McKellar	Lisa Lambert and Greg Morrison	
2006	Grey Gardens	Doug Wright	Scott Frankel	Michael Korie
2006	Jersey Boys	Marshall Brickman and Rick Elice	Bob Gaudio and Bob Crewe	
2006	See What I Wanna See	Michael John LaChiusa		
2006	Thrill Me	Stephen Dolginoff		
2006	The Wedding Singer	Tim Herlihy and Chad Beguelin	Matthew Sklar	Chad Beguelin
2007
2007	Spring Awakening	Steven Sater	Duncan Sheik	Steven Sater
2007	Curtains	Rupert Holmes	John Kander	Fred Ebb
2007	In the Heights	Quiara Alegría Hudes	Lin-Manuel Miranda	
2007	Legally Blonde	Heather Hach	Nell Benjamin and Laurence O'Keefe	
2007	LoveMusik	Alfred Uhry	Kurt Weill	Various
2007	Mary Poppins	Julian Fellowes	Robert B. Sherman, Richard M. Sherman, George Stiles and Anthony Drewe	
2008
2008	Passing Strange	Stew	Stew and Heidi Rodewald	Stew
2008	A Catered Affair	Harvey Fierstein	John Bucchino	
2008	Adding Machine	Jason Loewith and Joshua Schmidt	Joshua Schmidt	Jason Loewith and Joshua Schmidt
2008	The Glorious Ones	Lynn Ahrens	Stephen Flaherty	Lynn Ahrens
2008	The Slug Bearers of Kayrol Island	Ben Katchor	Mark Mulcahy	Ben Katchor
2008	Xanadu	Douglas Carter Beane	Jeff Lynne and John Farrar	
2009
2009	Billy Elliot the Musical	Lee Hall	Elton John	Lee Hall
2009	9 to 5	Patricia Resnick	Dolly Parton	
2009	Fela!	Bill T. Jones and Jim Lewis	Fela Kuti	
2009	Liza's at the Palace...	Ron Lewis	Various	
2009	Shrek the Musical	David Lindsay-Abaire	Jeanine Tesori	David Lindsay-Abaire
2009	The Story of My Life	Brian Hill	Neil Bartram	

=== 2010s ===
Year	Musical	Book	Music	Lyrics
2010
2010	Memphis	Joe DiPietro	David Bryan	Joe DiPietro and David Bryan
2010	The Addams Family	Marshall Brickman and Rick Elice	Andrew Lippa	
2010	American Idiot	Michael Mayer and Billie Joe Armstrong	Green Day	Billie Joe Armstrong
2010	Everyday Rapture	Dick Scanlan and Sherie Rene Scott	Various	
2010	The Scottsboro Boys	David Thompson	John Kander and Fred Ebb	
2010	Yank!	David Zellnik	Joseph Zellnik	David Zellnik
2011
2011	The Book of Mormon	Trey Parker, Robert Lopez and Matt Stone		
2011	In Transit	Kristen Anderson-Lopez, James-Allen Ford, Russ Kaplan and Sara Wordsworth		
2011	The Kid	Michael Zam	Andy Monroe	Jack Lechner
2011	Priscilla, Queen of the Desert	Stephan Elliott and Allan Scott	Various	
2011	See Rock City & Other Destinations	Adam Mathias	Brad Alexander	Adam Mathias
2011	Sister Act	Cheri Steinkellner, Bill Steinkellner and Douglas Carter Beane	Alan Menken	Glenn Slater
2012
2012	Once	Enda Walsh	Glen Hansard and Markéta Irglová	
2012	Bonnie & Clyde	Ivan Menchell	Frank Wildhorn	Don Black
2012	Death Takes a Holiday	Peter Stone and Thomas Meehan	Maury Yeston	
2012	Leap of Faith	Janus Cercone and Glenn Slater	Alan Menken	Glenn Slater
2012	Newsies	Harvey Fierstein	Alan Menken	Jack Feldman
2012	Nice Work If You Can Get It	Joe DiPietro	George and Ira Gershwin	
2012	Queen of the Mist	Michael John LaChiusa		
2013
2013	Matilda the Musical	Dennis Kelly	Tim Minchin	
2013	A Christmas Story: The Musical	Joseph Robinette	Benj Pasek and Justin Paul	
2013	Giant	Sybille Pearson	Michael John LaChiusa	
2013	Hands on a Hardbody	Doug Wright	Amanda Green and Trey Anastasio	Amanda Green
2013	Here Lies Love	—N/a	David Byrne and Fatboy Slim	
2013	Natasha, Pierre and the Great Comet of 1812	Dave Malloy		
2013	The Other Josh Cohen	David Rossmer and Steve Rosen		
2014
2014	A Gentleman's Guide to Love and Murder	Robert L. Freedman	Steven Lutvak	Robert L. Freedman and Steven Lutvak
2014	Aladdin	Chad Beguelin	Alan Menken	Chad Beguelin, Howard Ashman and Tim Rice
2014	Beautiful: The Carole King Musical	Douglas McGrath	Various	
2014	The Bridges of Madison County	Marsha Norman	Jason Robert Brown	
2014	Fun Home	Lisa Kron	Jeanine Tesori	Lisa Kron
2014	Love's Labour's Lost	Alex Timbers	Michael Friedman	
2014	Rocky the Musical	Thomas Meehan	Stephen Flaherty	Lynn Ahrens
2015
2015	Hamilton	Lin-Manuel Miranda		
2015	An American in Paris	Craig Lucas	George Gershwin	Ira Gershwin
2015	Fly By Night	Will Connolly, Michael Mitnick and Kim Rosenstock		
2015	Pretty Filthy	Bess Wohl	Michael Friedman	
2015	Something Rotten!	Karey Kirkpatrick and John O'Farrell	Karey Kirkpatrick and Wayne Kirkpatrick	
2015	The Visit	Terrence McNally	John Kander	Fred Ebb
2016
2016	Shuffle Along	George C. Wolfe	Eubie Blake and Noble Sissle	
2016	First Daughter Suite	Michael John LaChiusa		
2016	Daddy Long Legs	John Caird	Paul Gordon	
2016	School of Rock	Julian Fellowes	Andrew Lloyd Webber	Glenn Slater
2016	Waitress	Jessie Nelson	Sara Bareilles	
2017
2017	Come from Away	Irene Sankoff and David Hein		
2017	Anastasia	Terrence McNally	Stephen Flaherty	Lynn Ahrens
2017	The Band's Visit	Itamar Moses	David Yazbek	
2017	Hadestown	Anaïs Mitchell		
2017	The Lightning Thief: The Percy Jackson Musical	Joe Tracz	Rob Rokicki	
2018
2018	SpongeBob SquarePants	Kyle Jarrow	Various	
2018	Desperate Measures	Peter Kellogg	David Friedman	Peter Kellogg
2018	KPOP	Jason Kim	Helen Park and Max Vernon	
2018	Mean Girls	Tina Fey	Jeff Richmond	Nell Benjamin
2018	Old Stock: A Refugee Love Story	Hannah Moscovitch	Ben Caplan and Christian Barry	
2019
2019	The Prom	Bob Martin and Chad Beguelin	Matthew Sklar	Chad Beguelin
2019	Be More Chill	Joe Tracz	Joe Iconis	
2019	The Hello Girls	Peter Mills and Cara Reichel	Peter Mills	
2019	Rags Parkland Sings the Songs of the Future	Andrew R. Butler		
2019	Tootsie	Robert Horn	David Yazbek	

=== 2020s ===
Year	Musical	Book	Music	Lyrics
2020
2020	A Strange Loop	Michael R. Jackson		
2020	Octet	Dave Malloy		
2020	The Secret Life of Bees	Lynn Nottage	Duncan Sheik	Susan Birkenhead
2020	Soft Power	David Henry Hwang	Jeanine Tesori	David Henry Hwang and Jeanine Tesori
2020	The Wrong Man	Ross Golan		
2021	No awards: New York theatres shuttered, March 2020 to September 2021, due to the COVID-19 pandemic in New York City			
2022
2022	Kimberly Akimbo	David Lindsay-Abaire	Jeanine Tesori	David Lindsay-Abaire
2022	The Hang	Taylor Mac	Matt Ray	Taylor Mac
2022	Harmony: A New Musical	Bruce Sussman	Barry Manilow	Bruce Sussman
2022	Intimate Apparel	Lynn Nottage	Ricky Ian Gordon	Lynn Nottage
2022	Six	Toby Marlow and Lucy Moss		
2023
2023	Some Like It Hot	Matthew López & Amber Ruffin	Marc Shaiman	Marc Shaiman and Scott Wittman
2023	& Juliet	David West Read	Max Martin and various others	
2023	Between the Lines	Timothy Allen McDonald	Elyssa Samsel and Kate Anderson	
2023	F*ck7thGrade	Liza Birkenmeier	Jill Sobule	
2023	Shucked	Robert Horn	Brandy Clark and Shane McAnally	
2023	White Girl in Danger	Michael R. Jackson		
2024	Dead Outlaw	Itamar Moses	David Yazbek and Erik Della Penna	
2024	Illinoise	Justin Peck and Jackie Sibblies Drury	Sufjan Stevens	
2024	Lizard Boy	Justin Huertas		
2024	Teeth	Michael R. Jackson and Anna K. Jacobs		
2024	The Connector	Jonathan Marc Sherman	Jason Robert Brown	
2024	The Outsiders	Adam Rapp and Justin Levine	Jonathan Clay, Zach Chance, and Justin Levine	
2025
2025	Maybe Happy Ending	Will Aronson and Hue Park	Will Aronson	Will Aronson and Hue Park
2025	Boop! The Musical	Bob Martin	David Foster	Susan Birkenhead
2025	Death Becomes Her	Marco Pennette	Julia Mattison and Noel Carey	
2025	Just in Time	Warren Leight and Isaac Oliver	various artists	
2025	Music City	Peter Zinn	J. T. Harding	

== See also ==
- Laurence Olivier Award for Best New Musical
- Tony Award for Best Musical
