= List of Asian Tony Award winners and nominees =

This is a list of Tony Award winners and nominees who are of Asian descent or native to an Asian country. As of the 75th Tony Awards, which were presented on June 12, 2022, there are 14 individual Asian Tony Award winners, including 13 competitive award winners. The first Asian to win a Tony Award was Willa Kim in 1981 when she won the Tony Award for Best Costume Design in a Musical for Sophisticated Ladies.

== Show and technical ==
=== Best Musical ===
Best Musical
Year	Recipient	Show	Status	Milestone / Notes	Ref(s)
2011	Yasuhiro Kawana	Catch Me If You Can	Nominated	(Shared with Margo Lion, Hal Luftig, Stacey Mindich, Scott & Brian Zeilinger, The Rialto Group, The Araca Group, Michael Watt, Barbara & Buddy Freitag, Jay & Cindy Gutterman/Pittsburgh CLO, Elizabeth Williams, Johnny Roscoe Productions/Van Dean, Fakston Productions/Solshay Productions, Patty Baker/Richard Winkler, Nederlander Presentations, Inc., Warren Trepp, Remmel T. Dickinson, Paula Herold/Kate Lear, Stephanie P. McClelland, Jamie deRoy, Barry Feirstein, Rainerio J. Reyes, Rodney Rigby, Loraine Boyle, Amuse Inc., Joseph & Matthew Deitch/Cathy Chernoff, Joan Stein/Jon Murray, and The 5th Avenue Theatre.)	
2013	Yasuhiro Kawana	Kinky Boots	Won	First Asian to win for Best Musical. (Shared with Daryl Roth, Hal Luftig, James L. Nederlander, Terry Allen Kramer, Independent Presenters Network, CJ E&M, Jayne Baron Sherman, Just for Laughs Theatricals/Judith Ann Abrams, Jane Bergère, Allan S. Gordon & Adam S. Gordon, Ken Davenport, Hunter Arnold, Lucy & Phil Suarez, Bryan Bantry, Ron Fierstein & Dorsey Regal, Jim Kierstead/Gregory Rae, BB Group/Christina Papagjika, Michael DeSantis/Patrick Baugh, Brian Smith/Tom & Connie Walsh, Warren Trepp, and Jujamcyn Theaters.)	
2014	Jhett Tolentino	A Gentlemen’s Guide to Love and Murder	Won	Second Asian to win for Best Musical. (Shared with Joey Parnes, S.D. Wagner, John Johnson, 50 Church Street Productions, Joan Raffe, Jay Alix & Una Jackman, Catherine & Fred Adler, Rhoda Herrick, Kathleen K. Johnson, Megan Savage, ShadowCatcher Entertainment, Ron Simons, True Love Productions, Jamie deRoy, Four Ladies & One Gent, John Arthur Pinckard, Greg Nobile, Stewart Lane & Bonnie Comley, Exeter Capital/Ted Snowdon, Ryan Hugh Mackey, Cricket-CTM Media/Mano-Horn Productions, Dennis Grimaldi/Margot Astrachan, Hello Entertainment/Jamie Bendell, Michael T. Cohen/Joe Sirola, Joseph & Carson Gleberman/William Megevick, Green State Productions, The Hartford Stage, and The Old Globe.)	
2017	Raymond Poliquit	Dear Evan Hansen	Won	Third Asian to win for Best Musical.	

=== Best Revival of a Musical ===
Best Revival of a Musical
Year	Recipient	Show	Status	Milestone / Notes	Ref(s)
2012	Yasuhiro Kawana	Evita	Nominated	(Shared with Hal Luftig, Scott Sanders Productions, Roy Furman, Allan S. Gordon/Adam S. Gordon, James L. Nederlander, Terry Allen Kramer, Gutterman Fuld Chernoff/Pittsburgh CLO, Thousand Stars Productions, Adam Blanshay, Adam Zotovich, Robert Ahrens, Stephanie P. McClelland, Carole L. Haber, Richardo Hornos, Carol Fineman, Brian Smith, and Warren & Jâlé Trepp.)	

=== Best Direction of a Musical ===
Best Direction of a Musical
Year	Recipient	Show	Status	Milestone / Notes	Ref(s)
2009	Diane Paulus	Hair	Nominated	—	
2012	Diane Paulus	The Gershwins' Porgy and Bess	Nominated		
2013	Diane Paulus	Pippin	Won	First Asian to win for Best Direction of a Musical	
2020	Diane Paulus	Jagged Little Pill	Nominated		

=== Best Book of a Musical ===
Best Book of a Musical
Year	Recipient	Show	Status	Milestone / Notes	Ref(s)
2003	David Henry Hwang	Flower Drum Song	Nominated	—	
2011	Robert Lopez	The Book of Mormon	Won	First Asian to win for Best Book of a Musical. First Asian to win a third Tony Award. Second Asian to win a second Tony Award. (Shared with Trey Parker and Matt Stone.)	
2025	Hue Park	Maybe Happy Ending	Won	(Shared with Will Aronson.)	

=== Best Original Score ===
Best Original Score
Year	Recipient	Show	Status	Milestone / Notes	Ref(s)
2004	Robert Lopez	Avenue Q	Won	First Asian to win for Best Original Score. (Shared with Jeff Marx.)	
2011	Robert Lopez	The Book of Mormon	Won	First Asian to win a third Tony Award. Second Asian to win a second Tony Award. (Shared with Trey Parker and Matt Stone.)	
2018	Robert Lopez	Frozen	Nominated	(Shared with Kristen Anderson-Lopez.)	
2025	Hue Park	Maybe Happy Ending	Won	(Shared with Will Aronson.)	

=== Best Orchestrations ===
Best Orchestrations
Year	Recipient	Show	Status	Milestone / Notes	Ref(s)
2018	Jamshied Sharifi	The Band's Visit	Won		
2025	Marco Paguia	Buena Vista Social Club	Won	—	

=== Best Choreography ===
Best Choreography
Year	Recipient	Show	Status	Milestone / Notes	Ref(s)
1989	Kimi Okada	Largely New York	Nominated	(Shared with Bill Irwin.)	
2004	Farah Khan	Bombay Dreams	Nominated	(Shared with Anthony Van Laast.)	

=== Best Scenic Design in a Musical ===
Best Scenic Design in a Musical
Year	Recipient	Show	Status	Milestone / Notes	Ref(s)
1970	Ming Cho Lee	Billy	Nominated	—	
2017	Mimi Lien	Natasha, Pierre & The Great Comet Of 1812	Won	First Asian to win Best Scenic Design in a Musical.	
2023	Mimi Lien	Sweeney Todd: The Demon Barber of Fleet Street	Nominated		
2024	Takeshi Kata	Water for Elephants	Nominated		

=== Best Costume Design in a Musical ===
Best Costume Design in a Musical
Year	Recipient	Show	Status	Milestone / Notes	Ref(s)
1975	Willa Kim	Goodtime Charley	Nominated	—	
1978	Willa Kim	Dancin'	Nominated	—	
1981	Willa Kim	Sophisticated Ladies	Won	First Asian to win a Tony Award. First Asian to win for Best Costume Design in a Musical.	
1986	Willa Kim	Song & Dance	Nominated	—	
1989	Willa Kim	Legs Diamond	Nominated	—	
1991	Willa Kim	The Will Rogers Follies	Won	First Asian to win a second Tony Award.	
2005	Junko Kushino	Pacific Overtures	Nominated		
2012	Eiko Ishioka	Spider-Man: Turn Off the Dark	Nominated		
2014	Linda Cho	A Gentlemen's Guide to Love and Murder	Won	Second Asian to win for Best Costume Design in a Musical.	
2017	Linda Cho	Anastasia	Nominated	—	
2018	Clint Ramos	Once on This Island	Nominated		
2023	Clint Ramos	KPOP	Nominated		
2023	Sophia Choi	KPOP	Nominated		
2024	Linda Cho	The Great Gatsby	Won		
2025	Clint Ramos	Maybe Happy Ending	Nominated		

=== Best Lighting Design in a Musical ===
Best Lighting Design in a Musical
Year	Recipient	Show	Status	Milestone / Notes	Ref(s)
2023	Lap Chi Chu	Lerner & Loewe's Camelot	Nominated		
2024	Hana S. Kim	The Outsiders	Won	First Asian to win for Best Lighting Design of a Musical.	
2024	David Bengali	Water for Elephants	Nominated		
2025	Ruey Horng Sun	Floyd Collins	Nominated		

=== Best Sound Design of a Musical ===
Best Sound Design of a Musical
Year	Recipient	Show	Status	Milestone / Notes	Ref(s)
2012	Kai Harada	Follies	Nominated		
2018	Kai Harada	The Band's Visit	Won	First Asian to win for Best Sound Design of a Musical.	
2023	Kai Harada	New York, New York	Nominated		
2024	Kai Harada	Merrily We Roll Along	Nominated		

=== Best Play ===
Best Play
Year	Recipient	Show	Status	Milestone / Notes	Ref(s)
1988	David Henry Hwang	M. Butterfly	Won	First Asian to win for Best Play. (Shared with Stuart Ostrow and David Geffen.)	
1998	David Henry Hwang	Golden Child	Nominated	(Shared with Benjamin Mordecai, Dori Berinstein, John Kao, Talia Shire, John F. Kennedy Center for the Performing Arts, South coast Repertory, The Joseph Papp Public Theater/New York Shakespeare Festival, American Conservatory Theater.)	
2013	Jhett Tolentino	Vanya and Sonia and Masha and Spike	Won	Second Asian to win for Best Play. (Shared with Christopher Durang, Joey Parnes, Larry Hirschhorn, Joan Raffe, Martin Platt & David Elliott, Pat Flicker Addiss, Catherine Adler, John O'Boyle, Joshua Goodman, Jamie deRoy/Richard Winkler, Cricket Hooper Jiranek/Michael Palitz, Mark S. Golub & David S. Golub, Radio Mouse Entertainment, ShadowCatcher Entertainment, Mary Cossette/Barbara Manocherian, Megan Savage/Meredith Lynsey Schade, Hugh Hysell/Richard Jordan, Cheryl Wiesenfeld/Ron Simons, S.D. Wagner, John Johnson, McCarter Theatre Center, and Lincoln Center Theater.)	
2015	Jhett Tolentino	Hand to God	Nominated	(Shared with Robert Askins, Kevin McCollum, Broadway Global Ventures, CMC, Morris Berchard, Mariano V. Tolentino Jr., Stephanie Kramer, LAMS Productions, DeSimone/Winkler, Joan Raffe, Timothy Laczynski, Lily Fan, Ayal Miodovnik, Jam Theatricals, Ensemble Studio Theatre, and MCC Theater.)	

=== Best Revival of a Play ===
Best Revival of a Play
Year	Recipient	Show	Status	Milestone / Notes	Ref(s)
2014	Jhett Tolentino	A Raisin in the Sun	Won	First Asian to win for Best Revival of a Play. (Shared with Scott Rudin, Roger Berlind, Eli Bush, Jon B. Platt, Scott M. Delman, Roy Furman, Stephanie P. McClelland, Ruth Hendel, Sonia Friedman/Tulchin Bartner, The Araca Group, Heni Koenigsberg, Daryl Roth, Joan Raffe, Joey Parnes, S.D. Wagner, and John Johnson.)	
2015	Jhett Tolentino	This Is Our Youth	Nominated	(Shared with Scott Rudin, Eli Bush, Roger Berlind, William Berlind, Jon B. Platt, Roy Furman, The Shubert Organization, Ruth Hendel, Scott M. Delman, Stephanie P. McClelland, Sonia Friedman, Tulchin Bartner, The Araca Group, Heni Koenigsberg, Daryl Roth, Joan Raffe, Catherine & Fred Adler, Joey Parnes, Sue Wagner, John Johnson, and Steppenwolf Theatre Company.)	

=== Best Direction of a Play ===
Best Direction of a Play
Year	Recipient	Show	Status	Milestone / Notes	Ref(s)
—	—	—	—	—	

=== Best Scenic Design in a Play ===
Best Scenic Design in a Play
Year	Recipient	Show	Status	Milestone / Notes	Ref(s)
1983	Ming Cho Lee	K2	Won	First Asian to win for Best Scenic Design in a Play.	
2020	Clint Ramos	Slave Play	Nominated		

=== Best Costume Design in a Play ===
Best Costume Design in a Play
Year	Recipient	Show	Status	Milestone / Notes	Ref(s)
2016	Clint Ramos	Eclipsed	Won	First Asian to win for Best Costume Design of a Play.	
2019	Clint Ramos	Torch Song	Nominated		
2020	Clint Ramos	The Rose Tattoo	Nominated		

=== Best Lighting Design in a Play ===
Best Lighting Design in a Play
Year	Recipient	Show	Status	Milestone / Notes	Ref(s)
2020	Jiyoun Chang	Slave Play	Nominated		
2022	Jiyoun Chang	for colored girls who have considered suicide/when the rainbow is enuf	Nominated	—	
2022	Yi Zhao	The Skin of Our Teeth	Nominated	—	
2024	Amith Chandrashaker	Prayer for the French Republic	Nominated		
2024	Jiyoun Chang	Stereophonic	Nominated		
2025	David Bengali	Good Night, and Good Luck	Nominated		

=== Best Sound Design of a Play ===
Best Sound Design of a Play
Year	Recipient	Show	Status	Milestone / Notes	Ref(s)
—	—	—	—	—	

== Performance ==
=== Best Performance by a Leading Actor in a Play ===
Best Performance by a Leading Actor in a Play
Year	Recipient	Show	Role	Status	Milestone / Notes	Ref(s)
2025	Daniel Dae Kim	Yellow Face	DHH	Nominated	First Asian to be nominated for Best Performance by a Leading Actor in a Play	

=== Best Performance by a Leading Actress in a Play ===
Best Performance by a Leading Actress in a Play
Year	Recipient	Show	Role	Status	Milestone / Notes	Ref(s)
—	—	—	—	—	—	

=== Best Performance by a Featured Actor in a Play ===
Best Performance by a Featured Actor in a Play
Year	Recipient	Show	Role	Status	Milestone / Notes	Ref(s)
1988	BD Wong	M. Butterfly	Song Liling	Won	First Asian to win for Best Performance by a Featured Actor in a Play.	
2025	Francis Jue	Yellow Face	HYH/Others	Won		
2025	Conrad Ricamora	Oh, Mary!	Mary's Husband	Nominated		

=== Best Performance by a Featured Actress in a Play ===
Best Performance by a Featured Actress in a Play
Year	Recipient	Show	Role	Status	Milestone / Notes	Ref(s)
1998	Julyana Soelistyo	Golden Child	Ma/Eng Ahn	Nominated		
2025	Tala Ashe	English	Elham	Nominated		
2025	Marjan Neshat	English	Marjan	Nominated		

=== Best Performance by a Leading Actor in a Musical ===
Best Performance by a Leading Actor in a Musical
Year	Recipient	Show	Role	Status	Milestone / Notes	Ref(s)
1996	Lou Diamond Phillips	The King and I	King Mongkut of Siam	Nominated	—	
2015	Ken Watanabe	The King and I	King Mongkut of Siam	Nominated	First Japanese actor to be nominated in this category.	
2025	Darren Criss	Maybe Happy Ending	Oliver	Won	First Asian actor to win in this category	

=== Best Performance by a Leading Actress in a Musical ===
Best Performance by a Leading Actress in a Musical
Year	Recipient	Show	Role	Status	Milestone / Notes	Ref(s)
1991	Lea Salonga	Miss Saigon	Kim	Won	First Asian actress to win a Tony Award. First Asian to win for Best Performance by a Leading Actress in a Musical.	
1991	June Angela	Shōgun: The Musical	Lady Mariko	Nominated	—	
2016	Phillipa Soo	Hamilton	Eliza Hamilton	Nominated	—	
2017	Eva Noblezada	Miss Saigon	Kim	Nominated	—	
2019	Eva Noblezada	Hadestown	Eurydice	Nominated	—	
2025	Nicole Scherzinger	Sunset Boulevard	Norma Desmond	Won		

=== Best Performance by a Featured Actor in a Musical ===
Best Performance by a Featured Actor in a Musical
Year	Recipient	Show	Role	Status	Milestone / Notes	Ref(s)
—	—	—	—	—	—	

=== Best Performance by a Featured Actress in a Musical ===
Best Performance by a Featured Actress in a Musical
Year	Recipient	Show	Role	Status	Milestone / Notes	Ref(s)
1996	Joohee Choi	The King and I	Tuptim	Nominated		
2008	Loretta Ables Sayre	South Pacific	Bloody Mary	Nominated		
2015	Ruthie Ann Miles	The King and I	Lady Thiang	Won	First Asian to win for Best Performance by a Featured Actress in a Musical. Second Asian actress to win a Tony Award.	
2018	Ashley Park	Mean Girls	Gretchen Wieners	Nominated		
2023	Ruthie Ann Miles	Sweeney Todd: The Demon Barber of Fleet Street	The Beggar Woman	Nominated		

== Special awards ==
=== Special Tony Award / Lifetime Achievement Award ===
Special Tony Award / Lifetime Achievement Award
Year	Recipient	Status	Ref(s)
2013	Ming Cho Lee	Honoree	

=== Tony Honors for Excellence in Theatre ===
Tony Honors for Excellence in Theatre
Year	Recipient	Status	Ref(s)
2022	Asian American Performers Action Coalition	Honoree	

=== Isabelle Stevenson Award ===
Isabelle Stevenson Award
Year	Recipient	Status	Ref(s)
2017	Baayork Lee	Honoree	

== See also ==
- List of Asian Academy Award winners and nominees
- List of Academy Award winners and nominees of Asian descent
- List of Asian Golden Globe winners and nominees
