= Outer Critics Circle Award for Outstanding Book of a Musical =

Annual American award honoring books of Broadway and Off-Broadway theater productions

- Awarded for: Outstanding Book of a Musical
- Location: New York City
- Presented by: Outer Critics Circle
- Currently held by: Cinco Paul for Schmigadoon! (2026)
- Website: OuterCritics.org

The Outer Critics Circle Award for Outstanding Book of a Musical is an annual award given to the author of the best book of a musical on Broadway or Off-Broadway, as determined by Outer Critics Circle. The award has been given out since the 2011–2012 season.

Since its inception, no author has been nominated more than twice. Robert Horn has won the award the most times, with two wins for Tootsie and Shucked.

== Award winners ==
=== 2010s ===
indicates the winner.

Year	Production	Author	Ref.
2012
2012	Once	Enda Walsh	
2012	Nice Work If You Can Get It	Joe DiPietro	
2012	Queen of the Mist	Michael John LaChiusa	
2013
2013	Matilda	Dennis Kelly	
2013	Kinky Boots	Harvey Fierstein	
2013	Dogfight	Peter Duchan	
2013	Chaplin	Christopher Paul Curtis and Thomas Meehan	
2013	Rodgers and Hammerstein's Cinderella	Douglas Carter Beane	
2014
2014	A Gentleman's Guide to Love and Murder	Robert L. Freedman	
2014	Fun Home	Lisa Kron	
2014	Beautiful: The Carol King Musical	Douglas McGrath	
2014	Disney's Aladdin	Chad Beguelin	
2015
2015	Hamilton	Lin-Manuel Miranda	
2015	It Shoulda Been You	Brian Hargrove	
2015	Something Rotten!	Karey Kirkpatrick and John O'Farrell	
2015	The Visit	Terrence McNally	
2015	The Last Ship	John Logan and Brian Yorkey	
2016
2016	Dear Evan Hansen	Steven Levenson	
2016	Daddy Long Legs	John Caird	
2016	Bright Star	Steve Martin and Edie Brickell	
2016	Lazarus	Enda Walsh and David Bowie	
2016	On Your Feet!	Alexander Dinelaris	
2017
2017	Come From Away	Irene Sankoff and David Hein	
2017	Anastasia	Terrence McNally	
2017	The Band's Visit	Itamar Moses	
2017	A Bronx Tale	Chazz Palminteri	
2017	Groundhog Day	Danny Rubin	
2018
2018	Mean Girls	Tina Fey	
2018	Miss You Like Hell	Quiara Alegría Hudes	
2018	SpongeBob SquarePants	Kyle Jarrow	
2018	Desperate Measures	Peter Kellogg	
2019
2019	Tootsie	Robert Horn	
2019	The Hello Girls	Peter Mills and Cara Reichel	
2019	Hadestown	Anaïs Mitchell	
2019	Head Over Heels	Jeff Whitty and James Magruder	
2019	Girl from the North Country	Conor McPherson	

=== 2020s ===
Year	Production	Author	Ref.
2020 (Hon.)	Jagged Little Pill	Diablo Cody	
2020 (Hon.)	Soft Power	David Henry Hwang	
2020 (Hon.)	A Strange Loop	Michael R. Jackson	
2020 (Hon.)	The Secret Life of Bees	Lynn Nottage	
2020 (Hon.)	Romeo and Bernadette	Mark Saltzman	
2021	No awards held due to COVID-19 pandemic.		
2022
2022	Kimberly Akimbo	David Lindsay-Abaire	
2022	Intimate Apparel	Lynn Nottage	
2022	Mrs. Doubtfire	Karey Kirkpatrick and John O'Farrell	
2022	Mr. Saturday Night	Billy Crystal, Lowell Ganz and Babaloo Mandel	
2022	Harmony	Bruce Sussman	
2023
2023	Shucked	Robert Horn	
2023	& Juliet	David West Read	
2023	The Harder They Come	Suzan-Lori Parks	
2023	Titanique	Tye Blue, Marla Mindelle and Constantine Rousouli	
2023	Some Like It Hot	Matthew López and Amber Ruffin	
2024
2024	Suffs	Shaina Taub	
2024	Illinoise	Justin Peck and Jackie Sibblies Drury	
2024	Teeth	Anna K. Jacobs and Michael R. Jackson	
2024	Dead Outlaw	Itamar Moses	
2024	The Connector	Jonathan Marc Sherman	
2025
2025	Maybe Happy Ending	Will Aronson and Hue Park	
2025	Boop! The Musical	Bob Martin	
2025	Death Becomes Her	Marco Pennette	
2025	We Live in Cairo	Daniel Lazour and Patrick Lazour	
2025	Operation Mincemeat	David Cumming, Felix Hagan, Natasha Hodgson and Zoe Roberts	
2026
2026	Schmigadoon!	Cinco Paul	
2026	The Lost Boys	David Hornsby and Chris Hoch	
2026	Beau the Musical	Douglas Lyons	
2026	Two Strangers (Carry a Cake Across New York)	Jim Barne and Kit Buchan	
2026	Mexodus	Brian Quijada and Nygel D. Robinson	

== Multiple wins ==
2 wins

- Robert Horn

== Multiple nominations ==
2 nominations

- Robert Horn
- Enda Walsh
- Karey Kirkpatrick
- John O'Farrell
- Terrence McNally
- Itamar Moses
- Michael R. Jackson
- Lynn Nottage

== See also ==
- Tony Award for Best Book of a Musical
- Drama Desk Award for Outstanding Book of a Musical
