= Helen J. Shen =

American actress

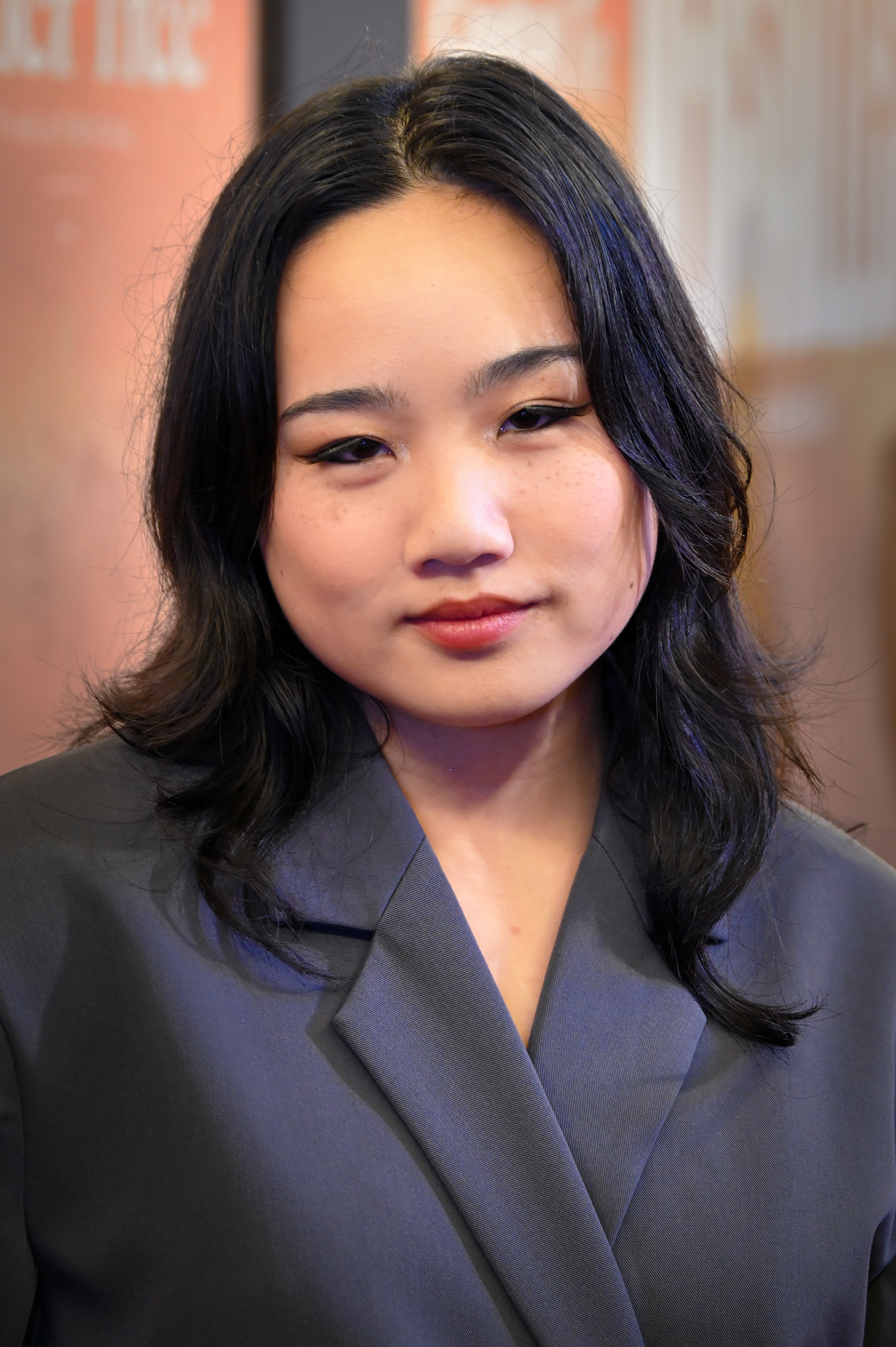
- Shen in 2025
- Born: January 28, 2000 (age 26); Basking Ridge, New Jersey, U.S.
- Education: University of Michigan (BFA)
- Occupations: Actress; singer
- Years active: 2023–present

Helen J. Shen (born January 28, 2000) is an American musical theater actress best known for originating the leading role of Claire in Maybe Happy Ending on Broadway, for which she was nominated for a Drama Desk Award, a Drama League Award and a Grammy Award. She has since had a supporting role in The Devil Wears Prada 2 (2026).

== Early life and education ==
Shen was born and raised in the Basking Ridge section of Bernards Township, New Jersey, to Chinese immigrant parents from Shanghai. Shen graduated from Ridge High School in 2018. She began taking piano lessons at age five and was competing internationally by age eight, a practice she continued through high school. However, she pivoted to musical theatre performance upon studying at University of Michigan, where she received the Earl V. Moore Award.

== Career ==
In 2022 Shen made her professional stage debut as Kyung-Hwa in Williamstown Theatre Festival's production of Man of God. The following year, she originated the role of JJ in the world premiere of the musical The Lonely Few at Geffen Playhouse in Los Angeles, California. She then appeared off-Broadway in Playwrights Horizons's world premiere of the musical Teeth as Promise Keeper Girl Keke; she left the role later that year to reprise her role as JJ in MCC Theater's 2024 New York debut of The Lonely Few.

In November 2024 Shen originated the leading female role of Claire in the Broadway production of the musical Maybe Happy Ending, which had premiered in Korea in 2016. For this role she was nominated for the 2025 Drama Desk Award for Outstanding Lead Performance in a Musical. She also received a Grammy Award nomination for Best Musical Theater Album at the 68th Annual Grammy Awards.

== Personal life ==
Shen has been dating fellow Broadway actor Andrew Barth Feldman since 2021.

== Filmography ==
=== Film ===
Year	Title	Role
2026	The Devil Wears Prada 2	Jin Chao

=== Television ===
Year	Title	Role	Notes
2026	Eternally Yours	Emma	Series regular

=== Stage ===
Year	Title	Role	Venue
2019	Mamma Mia!	Lisa	Connecticut Repertory Theatre
2022	Man of God	Kyung-Hwa	Williamstown Theatre Festival
2023	The Lonely Few	JJ	Geffen Playhouse, Los Angeles
2023	Sunset Boulevard	Betty Schaefer	Schlumberger Theater
2024	Teeth	Promise Keeper Girl Keke	Playwrights Horizons, Off-Broadway
2024	The Lonely Few	JJ	MCC Theater, Off-Broadway
2024–2026	Maybe Happy Ending	Claire	Belasco Theatre, Broadway

== Awards and nominations ==
Year	Award	Category	Work	Result
2025	Drama Desk Award	Outstanding Lead Performance in a Musical	Maybe Happy Ending	Nominated
2025	Drama League Award	Distinguished Performance	Maybe Happy Ending	Nominated
2026	Grammy Awards	Best Musical Theater Album	Maybe Happy Ending	Nominated
