= Soft Power (musical) =

2018 musical by David Henry Hwang & Jeanine Tesori

- Music: Jeanine Tesori
- Lyrics: David Henry Hwang; Jeanine Tesori (additional lyrics)
- Book: David Henry Hwang
- Premiere: May 3, 2018: Ahmanson Theatre, Los Angeles
- Productions: 2018 Los Angeles; 2018 San Francisco; 2019 Off-Broadway; 2024 Arlington, VA

Soft Power is a musical (also referred to by its authors as a "play with a musical") with book and lyrics by David Henry Hwang and music and additional lyrics by Jeanine Tesori.

Soft Power was intended as a "reverse The King And I". Instead of exoticizing an Asian country, Soft Power exoticizes America by looking at it from a hypothetical future Chinese musical. It also serves as a quasi-sequel to Hwang's 2007 play Yellow Face. Like that play, the semi-autobiographical work centers around a stand-in for the author named DHH interacting with fictional characters. The play was partially inspired by a 2015 stabbing of Hwang by a stranger on the streets of New York City.

== Performances ==
It began performances at the Ahmanson Theatre in Los Angeles in May 3, 2018 and at San Francisco's Curran Theatre in June. The musical began performances off-Broadway at The Public Theater on September 14, 2019, directed by Leigh Silverman, and closed on November 17, 2019. The show was nominated for 11 awards at the 2020 Drama Desk Awards, the most of any show that year, but didn't win any. Following a workshop in New York City and revisions, a shortened version, with only one act, began performances at Signature Theatre in Arlington, Virginia, on August 7, 2024.

== Summary ==
In 2015, playwright DHH (a stand-in for the author), meets with Chinese film executive Xue Xing about adapting a Chinese film into an American-style romantic comedy musical aimed at Chinese audiences. They attend a performance of The King and I that is a fundraiser for Hillary Clinton's presidential campaign alongside Xing's American girlfriend Zoe, where Xing briefly meets Clinton.

DHH's efforts to adapt the film, the title of which roughly translates to "Stick With Your Mistake", are complicated by what he sees as different values between American and Chinese culture: he takes umbrage with the ending where the hero returns to an unhappy marriage instead of following his heart, and feels that with the upcoming 2016 election and belief that Hillary Clinton will become President, he needs to write a musical where dreams are fulfilled and freedom flourishes. His view on the matter changes when Clinton loses the election to "the other candidate", and Xue Xing suggests suspending the project in the aftermath.

Shortly after, DHH is stabbed in the neck in an apparent hate crime. On the surgery table, he has a hallucinatory vision of a musical retelling of Xue Xing's trip to America, where he meets and falls in love with Hillary Clinton, as written by a Chinese author 50 years in the future. The musical imagines a future where America has lost its soft power, and many of the details about America are "as hilariously inexact as most Western stories set in Asia". For example, Xing travels to the "Hollywood Airport" and Hillary performs a number while revealing a Wonder Woman outfit in a glitzy McDonald's. Most of the "white" roles are played by Asian actors in whiteface and incorrect accents, a reversal of the movie version of The King and I. The musical also examines the nature of democracy, cultural identity, appropriation and racism.

== Cast and characters ==
Character	Off-Broadway (2019)
Xuē Xíng	Conrad Ricamora
DHH	Francis Jue
Zoe / Hillary Clinton	Alyse Alan Louis
Jīng / Prof. Lǐ Bìyù / Ensemble	Kendyl Ito
Bobby Bob / Jū Míng	Austin Ku
Randy Ray / Veep / Yáo Tuō / Ensemble	Raymond J. Lee
Betsy / Lóng Lín Kūn / Ensemble	Jaygee Macapugay
Chief Justice / Tony Monero / Hālǐ Aòhālā / Senator / Ensemble	Jon Hoche
Airport Greeter / Ensemble	Geena Quintos

== Musical numbers ==
Act 1

- Overture
- Dutiful — Xuē Xíng, Jīng
- Welcome to America — Airport Greeter, Ensemble
- Fuxing Park — Xuē Xíng, DHH
- I'm With Her — Hillary, Betsy, Xuē Xíng, DHH, Ensemble
- It Just Takes Time — Xuē Xíng, Hillary
- Election Night — Chief Justice, DHH, Bobby Bob, Ensemble
- I Am — DHH, Xuē Xíng

Act 2

- Entr'acte / Song of the Campaign — Hillary
- Happy Enough — Xuē Xíng, Hillary
- Good Guy with a Gun — Randy Ray, Ensemble
- The New Silk Road — Xuē Xíng, Ensemble
- Democracy — Hillary, Xuē Xíng
- Democracy (Reprise) — Company

== Critical response ==
Sam Hurwitt of The Mercury News called it "marvelously clever", also saying that Alyse Alan Louis as Hillary Clinton "tears the roof off the place", and Frank Rizzo of Variety said it was "subversive as well as funny, touching and thoroughly entertaining". In more mixed reviews, Jackson McHenry of Vulture said that it tended to be fascinating and messy, with the musical within the play being "occasionally too clever by half", and Jesse Green of The New York Times said that it was "something of a miracle but also something of a muddle", and "it's the kind of show that deserves, and unfortunately needs, to be seen at least twice."

== Awards and nominations ==
Soft Power won six of Los Angeles' 2019 Ovation Awards, including Best Production of a Musical (Large Theater).

The Public Theater production of Soft Power was nominated for five Lucille Lortel Awards, including Outstanding Musical.

The musical was named 2020 Pulitzer Prize for Drama finalist; the committee described the show as "A multi-layered and mischievous musical that deconstructs a beloved, original American art form to examine the promise and the limits of representation in both the theatrical and political senses of the word."

=== Original Off-Broadway production ===
Year	Award	Category	Nominee	Result
2020	Lucille Lortel Awards	Outstanding Musical		Nominated
2020	Lucille Lortel Awards	Outstanding Choreographer	Sam Pinkleton	Nominated
2020	Lucille Lortel Awards	Outstanding Lead Actor in a Musical	Francis Jue	Nominated
2020	Lucille Lortel Awards	Outstanding Lead Actor in a Musical	Conrad Ricamora	Nominated
2020	Lucille Lortel Awards	Outstanding Scenic Design	Clint Ramos	Nominated
2020	Drama Desk Awards	Outstanding Musical		Nominated
2020	Drama Desk Awards	Outstanding Actor in a Musical	Francis Jue	Nominated
2020	Drama Desk Awards	Outstanding Featured Actor in a Musical	Conrad Ricamora	Nominated
2020	Drama Desk Awards	Outstanding Featured Actress in a Musical	Alyse Alan Louis	Nominated
2020	Drama Desk Awards	Outstanding Director of a Musical	Leigh Silverman	Nominated
2020	Drama Desk Awards	Outstanding Music	Jeanine Tesori	Nominated
2020	Drama Desk Awards	Outstanding Book of a Musical	David Henry Hwang	Nominated
2020	Drama Desk Awards	Outstanding Orchestrations	Danny Troob, John Clancy, and Larry Hochman	Nominated
2020	Drama Desk Awards	Outstanding Scenic Design of a Musical	Clint Ramos	Nominated
2020	Drama Desk Awards	Outstanding Costume Design of a Musical	Anita Yavich	Nominated
2020	Drama Desk Awards	Outstanding Sound Design in a Musical	Kai Harada	Nominated
2020	Drama League Awards	Outstanding Production of a Musical		Nominated
2020	Pulitzer Prize for Drama		David Henry Hwang and Jeanine Tesori	Finalist
2020	Outer Critics Circle Award	Outstanding New Off-Broadway Musical		Honoree
2020	Outer Critics Circle Award	Outstanding Book of a Musical	David Henry Hwang	Honoree
2020	Outer Critics Circle Award	Outstanding New Score	Jeanine Tesori and David Henry Hwang	Honoree
2020	Outer Critics Circle Award	Outstanding Featured Actor in a Musical	Francis Jue	Honoree
2021	Grammy Awards	Best Musical Theater Album		Nominated

== Recording ==
The original cast recording was released on April 17, 2020 through Ghostlight Records. The album peaked at number 11 on the Billboard Cast Albums chart.
