= Maybe Happy Ending =

2016 South Korean one-act musical

- Korean theatre poster (2021 revival)
- Music: Will Aronson
- Lyrics: Hue Park; Will Aronson
- Book: Hue Park; Will Aronson
- Productions: 2016 Seoul; 2020 Atlanta; 2024 Broadway
- Awards: Korea Musical Award – Best Musical: Small Theater (2018); Tony Award for Best Musical; Tony Award for Best Original Score; Tony Award for Best Book of a Musical

Korean name
- Hangul: 어쩌면 해피엔딩
- RR: Eojjeomyeon haepi ending
- MR: Ŏtchŏmyŏn haep'i ending

Maybe Happy Ending (Korean: 어쩌면 해피엔딩) is a South Korean musical with lyrics written by Hue Park, music composed by Will Aronson, and book written by both Park and Aronson. The musical, which is performed without intermission, follows two human-like helper-bots, Oliver and Claire, who discover each other in Seoul later in the 21st century and develop a connection that challenges what they believe is possible for themselves, exploring relationships, love and mortality.

Directed by Kim Dong-yeon, Maybe Happy Ending had its premiere in Seoul at Lifeway Hall in DCF Daemyung Cultural Factory in 2016 to positive critical reviews. At the Korea Musical Awards, it was nominated for, and won, six awards, including Best Musical: Small Theatre, Music, Lyrics and Book. The musical also won four awards at the Yegreen Musical Awards including Musical of the Year and Music (Aronson). Maybe Happy Ending has been revived several times in Korea and internationally, including a Broadway production that opened in 2024 with another positive critical reception. It tied for a leading ten nominations at the 78th Tony Awards and won six, including Best Musical, Best Book and Best Score. It also won six Drama Desk Awards.

== Inception and development ==
In 2014, Hue Park was sitting in a coffee shop in Brooklyn, New York, when he heard the song "Everyday Robots" by Damon Albarn (front man of the rock bands Blur and Gorillaz) playing. Park was familiar with Blur, as it had been popular in South Korea while he was growing up there in the 1990s. Part of the song lyrics caught his attention: "We are everyday robots in the process of getting home." Park imagined a world inhabited by 'robots that look just like humans', eventually thinking up a scene where 'robots with human-like appearances and emotions are abandoned and live lonely lives alone'. Park had recently ended a long-term relationship, so he thought about the closing of a chapter in his life. "I experienced some losses with people around me – parting and death – when I was writing the play," he said. "I realized that love is an act to open your heart even though you expect to feel the pain of loss one day."

Park sent an email to his friend Will Aronson. Aronson was intrigued by Park's ideas, and they eventually started to write the story together. They started the story planning in February 2014. They pitched Maybe Happy Ending to a producer at the Wooran Cultural Foundation, a nonprofit foundation in Seoul that supports young artists in Korea, including through Seeya Stage programs that provide young artists with performance and training opportunities. The musical was accepted into one of these programs, and by fall of 2014, it was developed further. Kim Dong-yeon, who worked together with Park and Aronson on the musical Carmen, joined the project as director. Jeon Mi-do and Jeon Uk-jin starred in a workshop performance. Maybe Happy Ending had a three-night tryout engagement at Project Box Seeya in Wooran Cultural Foundation in September 2015.

The show was written in both Korean and English, with Aronson writing the initial draft in English and Park translating it into Korean. Both versions were performed at an industry workshop in New York City in 2016 as the first overseas development project supported by the Wooran Cultural Foundation. The English-language version of Maybe Happy Ending, then titled What I Learned from People, was awarded the 2017 Richard Rodgers Award by the American Academy of Arts and Letters. As the full English production was developed with a different team, Aronson and Park used the initial English script as the starting point rather than re-translating the finished Korean version. As a result, the final Broadway version has some noticeable differences from the version performed in Korea.

The musical's ending leaves it ambiguous as to whether Claire kept her memories like Oliver did. In the earliest draft of the musical, both characters kept their memories. The writers have said that as Claire is a more advanced model than Oliver, she would be better at lying if she kept them. In the Korean version, the actresses playing Claire are allowed to decide for themselves, with some changing their choice each night. For the Broadway version, the writers left it up to director Michael Arden and Claire actress Helen J. Shen to decide: Arden believes she erased her memories as he prefers a tragic interpretation, while Shen has declined to tell anyone her opinion.

== Setting ==
The musical is set in the near future in the Seoul Metropolitan Area. Oliver and Claire are robots that look human, created to help people. They reside in an apartment for helper bots abandoned by their owners. Oliver is an earlier model Helperbot that lacks some functions and social ability but is durable, while Claire is a newer model but consumes a lot of battery power, among other issues, despite its many functions. Aronson has said:

The setting is probably in the 2060s. ... People have become sort of so attached to their technology and more isolated, which is something we feel is happening now. But, looking ahead we see that as people have become cynical about the world and isolated from each other, these first-generation robots are discovering the world for the first time and discovering some of the things we've forgotten about.

== Plot ==
Oliver, a male Helperbot-3 model, powers on in his apartment in Helperbot Yards, a living facility in Seoul for retired Helperbots. He initiates his daily routine while listening to a song by jazz singer Gil Brentley ("Why Love?"). Oliver goes through the cycle of listening to music, caring for his potted plant HwaBoon, and receiving his regular Jazz Monthly magazine and replacement parts, while awaiting the return of his owner James from a long trip to Jeju Island. Years go by, and Helperbot Inc. discontinues manufacturing his replacement parts, but he has faith that James will return ("World Within My Room"). One day Claire, a female Helperbot-5 and one of his neighbors, knocks on his door to ask for help as her charger is broken. Oliver reluctantly gives her his charger, but insults her by bragging about the superior durability of the Helperbot-3s compared to the newer Helperbot-5s. Offended, Claire returns to her room to try to fix her charger herself, with little success. She reaches out to her friends, but they are unable to help due to their own maintenance issues ("The Way That It Has to Be"). Eventually, Oliver offers to let her use his charger if she sticks to a fixed schedule of picking it up and returning it. Claire agrees, and the exchange becomes a routine for the two of them ("Charger Exchange Ballet"). One day, Claire does not show up, and Oliver checks on her. Claire has managed to jerry-rig an external power supply and no longer needs the charger. Oliver denies that he was concerned about her and claims that he is glad he will not have to deal with her anymore. Claire runs a diagnostic and learns that her battery life is failing. Later, she visits Oliver's place to thank him and discovers he has been collecting money through bottle deposits so that he can travel with HwaBoon to Jeju Island to reunite with James ("Where You Belong"). Claire expresses interest in also going to Jeju Island, as it is the only place left in the world to see fireflies. She proposes they go together using her car. Oliver accepts, and they prepare for their trip ("Hitting the Road, Part 1", "Goodbye, My Room", "Hitting the Road, Part 2"). As it is illegal for retired Helperbots to go out in public on their own, they plan to pretend they are a human couple on holiday and come up with a believable story of how they first met ("The Rainy Day We Met"). Claire makes Oliver promise they will not fall in love, recalling the relationship between her married former owners, Jiyeon and Suhan.

Claire starts to run out of battery as they drive to the ferry, so they stop to charge at a motel that turns out to be a love hotel. The pair book a room for the night without being discovered, despite awkward conversations with the motel owner and another guest ("Jenny"). While in the room they bond over watching the movie Terminator 2: Judgment Day and mocking its depiction of robots; Claire begins to think that being with Oliver is not so bad ("How to Be Not Alone"). While Oliver is powered down, Claire accesses his memories, learning that James had lied to protect Oliver's feelings, and his move to Jeju Island was to be permanent, as was Oliver's retirement. On the road the next day, Claire frets over whether to tell Oliver the truth ("Hitting the Road, Part 3"). When they arrive at James's house on Jeju Island, Claire attempts to warn Oliver that James will break his heart ("What I Learned from People"). She shows Oliver her own memories of Jiyeon leaving her. Jiyeon had given Claire her administrative password so that she could access a deleted memory of Suhan making a pass at Claire: he was insecure about his lower social status than Jiyeon's, leading to the breakdown of their marriage. As Oliver protests that James is different, they are interrupted by the arrival of James's son, Junseo. Junseo reveals that James had died some years before, having moved to Jeju to be taken care of after he got sick, and that Junseo resented Oliver for replacing him as James's son after his parents separated, and so he forced James to leave Oliver behind. Junseo bitterly gives Oliver a Gil Brentley record that James left for him. Oliver despondently tells Claire she was right, but she notes that James proved her wrong by leaving a gift for Oliver, showing he truly cared about him ("'Goodbye Love' Piano Solo"). Though upset, Oliver suggests they go see the fireflies as Claire had wanted. As they walk into the forest, the lightning bugs slowly appear ("Chasing Fireflies"). The two excitedly take in the sight and even manage to catch one, which they put into a jar ("Never Fly Away").

They return to Seoul but feel their dynamic has changed ("A Sentimental Person"). Realizing that they've fallen in love with each other ("When You're in Love"), they admit their feelings and share a kiss ("Touch Sequence" (instrumental)). They realize their relationship has a time limit, but they continually put off ending it to do the things they think a human couple would do, even attempting to have a fight ("Then I Can Let You Go"). Eventually, Claire's body starts to fail her more, with her battery life continuing to diminish. Claire has at most a year of functionality left, while the durable Oliver has much longer. Hoping to spare each other pain, they try to end their relationship but cannot stop thinking of each other ("Goodbye, My Room" (reprise)). One day, Junseo visits Oliver, requesting some good memories of his father. While loading the memories onto a drive, the two talk about the importance of sharing happy memories with loved ones even if they feel painful, which causes Oliver to realize he cannot simply forget Claire. Before leaving, Junseo gives Oliver his administrative password as a peace offering. As both of them have their passwords, Oliver and Claire are able to erase their memories of each other. They decide this would be the best path for both of them; they agree that it is not a tragic ending but a kind of happy ending as their experiences still occurred ("Maybe Happy Ending"). They both get rid of objects that would remind them of their past, including the firefly they caught together, and seemingly erase their memories ("Memory Sequence" (instrumental)).

Sometime later, Oliver powers on in his apartment and greets HwaBoon as usual before initiating his daily routine ("Why Love" (reprise)). He is interrupted when Claire knocks on his door asking to borrow his charger. He hesitantly lets her in and gives her the charger before whispering to HwaBoon, "Don't tell her." While Claire charges she makes conversation, repeating some of the prior things she had initially said to Oliver. He responds with his prior bragging about the superiority of Helperbot-3s to Helperbot-5s. After a moment, however, he admits to some advantages of the newer model by listing things Claire helped him with before. Touched, Claire asks, "Do you think it'll be okay?" Oliver responds that he hopes so ("Finale").

=== Differences between Korean and English versions ===
The English-language version of Maybe Happy Ending largely follows the same plot as the Korean version, with the removal and addition of several characters and songs. In the Korean version, Oliver is a Helperbot-5 and Claire is a Helperbot-6. Characters in the Korean version that were cut are Oliver's mailman, whose aging during "World Within My Room" signifies the passage of time, and Claire's friend John, a fellow Helperbot-6 who visits to help fix her charger. Gil Brentley is an expanded version of the nameless spectral jazz singer in the Korean version, where he is part of the James/Multi-man role. James' son Junseo is new in the English version; in the Korean version, Oliver's interaction with James' family takes place offstage during the song "What I Learned from People". Claire's owners Jiyeon and Suhan, portrayed in a pre-recorded video, are absent from the Korean version, where their relationship is portrayed via a duet between the onstage band's violinist and cellist. The English version adds a subplot about Helperbots' administrative passwords; in the Korean version, Claire and Oliver are able to erase their memories without a password. In the Korean version, there is a subplot involving a clasp that Oliver makes for Claire as an adapter for his charger; in the final scene Oliver gives it to Claire after it is revealed that he kept his memories. The English version runs about 10 minutes shorter than the Korean version, cutting the scene and song "Nevertheless" (그럼에도 불구하고), which explicitly depicts Claire breaking down and Oliver's attempts to repair her.

== Casts ==
Character	Seoul	Broadway	US National Tour
Character	2016	2024	2026
Oliver	Jung Uk-jin	Darren Criss	Steven Huynh
Oliver	Jung Moon-sung	Darren Criss	Steven Huynh
Oliver	Kim Jae-bum	Darren Criss	Steven Huynh
Claire	Jeon Mi-do	Helen J. Shen	Claire Kwon
Claire	Choi Soo-jin	Helen J. Shen	Claire Kwon
James/Junseo/others	Go Hoon-jung	Marcus Choi	James Seol
James/Junseo/others	Seong Jong-wan	Marcus Choi	James Seol
Gil Brentley (Note: Gil Brentley is an expanded version of the jazz singer character that is part of the James/Multi-man role in the Korean version.)	—N/a	Dez Duron	Francisco Javier Gonzalez
Suhan (Note: A character only seen through prerecorded projections.)	—N/a	Young Mazino	
Jiyeon	—N/a	Arden Cho	
HwaBoon (Note: Hwaboon is a generic plant in the Korean production and an Aeonium Black Rose tree in the Broadway production. The Broadway production includes a bio for him in the show's website and the Playbill "Who's Who" section.)	N/A	Himself	Himself

=== Notable replacements ===
==== Korea (after 2016) ====
- Oliver: Jeon Sung-woo, Jung Moon-sung
- Claire: Park Ji-yeon, Hong Ji-hee, Park Jin-joo, Bang Min-ah

==== Broadway (2024–) ====
- Oliver: Andrew Barth Feldman

== Productions ==
=== Korea ===
In 2016, Maybe Happy Ending was one of the musicals selected for Seeya Stage and the premiere was held at Lifeway Hall in DCF Daemyung Cultural Factory 2nd Building from 20 December 2016 to 5 March 2017, running for 51 performances. The production was directed by Kim Dong-yeon, who also directed the tryout performance of the work. Designers were Nam Kyung-sik (set), Lee Dong-jin (lighting) and Doyeon (costumes). Jung Moon-sung, Kim Jae-bum, and Jung Uk-jin shared the role of Oliver; Jeon Mi-do and Choi Soo-jin played Claire; Ko Hoon-jung and Jong Wan-seong shared James. The opening performance was well received, with all tickets for the preview performance selling out after the opening, recording a 92% average occupancy rate. The show set a box office record for original musicals. The Wooran Cultural Foundation produced the original soundtrack and offered to donate the proceeds to establish a virtuous cycle in the culture and art industry. The production company, Daemyung Cultural Factory, and the creators participated in the donation.

A reunion concert with the original cast, as well as American cast members Josh Dela Cruz as Oliver and Ephie Aardema as Claire, was held at Project Box Seeya in Seoul 18–20 June 2017 and at the Playce Camp Jeju Spinning Wolf on 23 June. An encore performance was held at the DCF Daemyung Cultural Factory 2nd Building from 23 October to 12 November 2017, with the original cast reprising their roles. The encore run was also sold out.

Since then, it has been revived in Seoul in 2018, 2020, 2021, 2024 and 2025. The 2021 production was filmed and streamed online three times on Naver TV's C-Mu by CJ ENM Musical channel on 15, 22 and 29 November 2021.

A 10th anniversary revival began at Doosan Art Center, Seoul, on 30 October 2025 featuring a rotating cast of actors from previous productions, including original cast members Kim Jae-bum as Oliver, Jeon Mi-do and Choi Soo-jin as Claire, and Ko Hoon-jeong as James. This production is scheduled to be filmed on 20 January for future release. Following the scheduled closing on 25 January, the production is expected to tour Korea.

=== United States ===
==== Pre-Broadway ====
Selections from the musical, then titled What I Learned from People, were first presented in English at the Songwriters' Showcase for the National Alliance for Musical Theatre's 28th Annual Festival of New Musicals on 27 October 2016 at New World Stages in New York City. Josh Dela Cruz as Oliver, Ashley Park as Claire, and Marcus Choi as James performed the songs "Where You Belong" and "How to Be Not Alone". Dela Cruz and Park also recorded an English-language concept album.

Maybe Happy Ending had its English-language debut at Coca-Cola Stage at the Alliance Theatre in Atlanta where it ran from 18 January until 17 February 2020. The production was directed by Michael Arden, with Arden's husband Andy Mientus as associate director, and designs by Travis Hagenbuch (lighting), Clint Ramos (costumes), Sven Ortel (projections) and Peter Hylenski (sound). The cast included Kenny Tran as Oliver, Cathy Ang as Claire, Dez Duron as Gil Brentley, and John D. Haggerty as James. As the musical featured a largely Asian-American cast, Jesse Green of The New York Times praised the show for its casting inclusiveness.

==== Broadway (2024) ====
Playbill cover, Broadway

The Broadway production of the English version of Maybe Happy Ending, also directed by Arden, opened on 12 November 2024 at the Belasco Theater after previews beginning on 16 October. Darren Criss and Helen J. Shen star as Oliver and Claire, joined by Duron as Gil Brentley, Marcus Choi as James, and Young Mazino and Arden Cho in the pre-recorded roles of Suhan and Jiyeon. The start of previews was delayed for a month due to supply chain issues with the set, and several investors pulled out after a TikTok theatre influencer speculated the production would be cancelled; the producers were unable to raise the needed $16 million capitalization until the week of the opening night.

The production opened to unanimously positive reviews, but the show struggled financially, grossing well below its $765,000 weekly running costs during previews and in its first weeks after opening. Theatre insiders, Aronson and other creative team members believed it would close early. Encouraged by positive reviews and word-of-mouth, producers raised an additional $1.75 million on marketing; weekly grosses improved past $1 million for the first time during the Christmas holiday and continued to exceed its running costs afterwards. Criss, who is also a producer of the show, left the cast on 31 August 2025, and returned on 5 November. Shen's offstage boyfriend Andrew Barth Feldman played Oliver during his absence. Asian theatre artists expressed disappointment over the casting of Feldman, a non-Asian actor, in a show set in Korea and in a role originated on Broadway by an actor of partly Asian descent, noting that Asian actors are underrepresented on American stages. Shen left the production in February 2026, followed by Criss in May.

The show was nominated for ten Tony Awards and won six for Best Musical, Book, Score, Actor, Direction and Scenic Design. It also won six Drama Desk Awards out of nine nominations, including Outstanding Musical, Music, Lyrics and Book; three Outer Critics Circle Awards (including Outstanding Musical); and two Drama League Awards (including Outstanding Musical).

==== US national tour (2026) ====
A national tour began in September 2026, starting from the Hippodrome Theatre in Baltimore, Maryland. Directed by Arden, it stars Steven Huynh as Oliver and Claire Kwon as Claire, with Francisco Javier González as Gil and James Seol as James.

=== Other international productions ===
The first Japanese production of Maybe Happy Ending took place at Sunshine City Theater, Ikebukuro, Tokyo, Japan, from 19 to 28 May 2017. This version was produced by Synthwave with a new cast and production team including Kim Ji-ho as director and Im Jin-ho as choreographer. Oliver was played by Choi Dong-wook, Seong-je and Kevin Woo. Kim Bo-kyung and Song Sang-eun were both cast as Claire, with Rajun playing multiple roles including James. Synthwave produced another production that played in Yokohama and Osaka in 2018. Choi Dong-wook and Seong-je reprised their role as Oliver, joined by Yesung. Song Sang-eun reprised her role as Claire, joined by Kim Joo-yeon. Ra Jun and Kim Nam-ho shared James. Another Japanese production followed in Tokyo in 2020, starring Kenji Urai as Oliver, Shoko Nakagawa and Kana Hanazawa sharing Claire and Kenji Sakamoto and Shinji Saito as James.

A Chinese staging was produced by SAIC Shanghai Culture Square. Despite the travel inconvenience caused by the pandemic, Kim Dong-yeon came to Shanghai to direct. The Chinese tour began at the Theater Above, Shanghai, from 1 to 3 July 2021, and then visited Chengdu, Xiamen, Nanjing and Hangzhou in August, Wuxi in September and Tianjin in November. Oliver was played by Lars Huang, Claire by Yaorong Guo, and James by Bin Jiang.

== Musical numbers ==
- "Why Love?" (Korean title: 우린 왜 사랑했을까; lit. 'Why Did We Love?') – Gil Brentley
- "World Within My Room" (나의 방안에; lit. 'In My Room') – Oliver
- "The Way That It Has to Be" (끝까지 끝은 아니야; lit. 'It's Not the End Until the End') – Claire & Company
- "Charger Exchange Ballet" – Orchestra
- "Where You Belong" (고맙다, 올리버; lit. 'Thank You, Oliver') – Oliver & James
- "Tell Me About Fireflies, Please – Instrumental" (반딧불, 그리고 제주도; lit. 'Fireflies, and Jeju Island')
- "Hitting the Road, Part 1" (행운을 빌어줘, Part 1; lit. 'Good Luck, Part 1') – Oliver & Claire
- "Goodbye, My Room" ‡ – Oliver & Claire
- "Hitting The Road, Part 2" (행운을 빌어줘, Part 2; lit. 'Good Luck, Part 2') – Oliver & Claire
- "The Rainy Day We Met" (Korean title: "My Favorite Love Story") – Oliver & Claire
- "Jenny" † – Gil Brentley (Note: In place of "Old Love Songs" (낡고 익숙한 사랑 노래; lit. 'An Old and Familiar Love Song'), a different song performed by the jazz singer character in the Korean version.)
- "How To Be Not Alone" (생각보다, 생각만큼; lit. 'More Than I Thought, as Much as I Thought') – Claire
- "Hitting The Road, Part 3" † – Oliver & Claire (Note: In place of a song called "Driving" where Oliver and Claire describe their drive to Jeju Island through the Jeju Undersea Tunnel, a planned underwater tunnel that, as of the time of the writing of the show, had recently been proposed to be built.)
- "What I Learned from People" (사람들로 부터 배운 것) – Claire
- "Goodbye Love" Piano Solo (우린 왜 사랑했을까 Piano Solo; lit. '"Why Did We Love?" Piano Solo') – James
- "Chasing Fireflies" (반딧불 쫓기) – Orchestra
- "Never Fly Away" (반딧불에게; lit. 'To the Fireflies') – Oliver, Claire
- "A Sentimental Person" † – Gil Brentley (Note: In place of a wordless vocal duet called "Home Again".)
- "When You're In Love" (사랑이란; lit. 'What Love Is') – Oliver & Claire
- "Touch Sequence" (첫 입맞춤; lit. 'First Kiss') – Orchestra
- "Then I Can Let You Go" † – Oliver, Claire & Gil Brentley (Note: In place of two songs depicting Oliver and Claire's relationship: "First Time in Love", depicting the start of their romance, and "Nevertheless" (그럼에도 불구하고), where the two try to push through the pain of watching Claire literally fall apart.)
- "Goodbye, My Room" (reprise) (나의 방 안엔 & Goodbye, My Room (reprise).) – Oliver & Claire
- "Maybe Happy Ending" † – Oliver & Claire (Note: In place of "You Can Remember That" (그것만은 기억해도 돼); Claire gives Oliver permission to keep the memory of where to place his potted plant so it gets better sunlight.)
- "Memory Sequence" (기억을 지우기; lit. 'Erase Memory') – Orchestra
- "Why Love?" (reprise) (우린 왜 사랑했을까 Why Did We Love? (reprise)) – Gil Brentley
- "Finale" (사랑이란, 어쩌면; lit. 'What Love Is, Maybe') – Company

† Added for the English version.
‡ Song title is the same in Korean and English versions

== Film adaptation ==
A Korean-language film adaptation, titled ^어쩌면 해피엔딩 (My Favorite Love Story), premiered in 2023 at the Jecheon International Music Film Festival, directed by Lee Won-hoi. The screenplay was by Hwang Ho-gil and Lee Won-hoi, and the scoring, other than the songs from the musical, was by Jeon Se-jin. The film stars 2018 Seoul stage leads Shin Joo-hyup as Oliver and Kang Hye-in as Claire. Park and Aronson were not involved in the adaptation. Produced by Hidden Sequence and distributed by Ascendio Entertainment, KinoFilm, Roadshow Plus and Special Movie City, the film received a limited release in Korea at Megabox theaters beginning on 2 October 2025.

== Awards and nominations ==
List of awards
Award	Year	Category	Nominee(s)	Result	Ref.
Richard Rodgers Award by the American Academy of Arts and Letters	2017	Production Award	What I Learned from People (Note: Early English version of Maybe Happy Ending)	Won	
Yegreen Musical Awards	2017	Musical of the Year (small theatre)	Maybe Happy Ending	Won	
Yegreen Musical Awards	2017	Music Award	Will Aronson	Won	
Yegreen Musical Awards	2017	Female Popularity Award	Jeon Mi-do	Won	
Yegreen Musical Awards	2017	Best Director	Kim Dong-yeon	Won	
Korea Musical Awards	2018	Best Musical: Small Theater	Maybe Happy Ending	Won	
Korea Musical Awards	2018	Screenwriter/Lyricist	Hue Park & Will Aronson	Won	
Korea Musical Awards	2018	Composer	Will Aronson	Won	
Korea Musical Awards	2018	Best Actress	Jeon Mi-do	Won	
Korea Musical Awards	2018	Best Director	Kim Dong-yeon	Won	
E-Daily Culture Awards	2021	Grand Prize	Maybe Happy Ending	Won	
Drama Desk Awards	2025	Outstanding Musical	Maybe Happy Ending	Won	
Drama Desk Awards	2025	Outstanding Lead Performance in a Musical	Darren Criss	Nominated	
Drama Desk Awards	2025	Outstanding Lead Performance in a Musical	Helen J. Shen	Nominated	
Drama Desk Awards	2025	Outstanding Director of a Musical	Michael Arden	Won	
Drama Desk Awards	2025	Outstanding Music	Will Aronson and Hue Park	Won	
Drama Desk Awards	2025	Outstanding Lyrics	Will Aronson and Hue Park	Won	
Drama Desk Awards	2025	Outstanding Book of a Musical	Will Aronson and Hue Park	Won	
Drama Desk Awards	2025	Outstanding Orchestrations	Will Aronson	Nominated	
Drama Desk Awards	2025	Outstanding Scenic Design of a Musical	Dane Laffrey and George Reeve (includes video design)	Won	
Drama League Awards	2025	Outstanding Production of a Musical	Maybe Happy Ending	Won	
Drama League Awards	2025	Outstanding Direction of a Musical	Michael Arden	Won	
Drama League Awards	2025	Distinguished Performance	Darren Criss	Nominated	
Drama League Awards	2025	Distinguished Performance	Helen J. Shen	Nominated	
New York Drama Critics' Circle Awards	2025	Best Musical	Will Aronson and Hue Park	Won	
Outer Critics Circle Awards	2025	Outstanding New Broadway Musical	Maybe Happy Ending	Won	
Outer Critics Circle Awards	2025	Outstanding Lead Performer in a Broadway Musical	Darren Criss	Nominated	
Outer Critics Circle Awards	2025	Outstanding Book of a Musical	Will Aronson and Hue Park	Won	
Outer Critics Circle Awards	2025	Outstanding New Score	Will Aronson and Hue Park	Won	
Outer Critics Circle Awards	2025	Outstanding Orchestrations	Will Aronson	Nominated	
Outer Critics Circle Awards	2025	Outstanding Direction of a Musical	Michael Arden	Won	
Outer Critics Circle Awards	2025	Outstanding Scenic Design	Dane Laffrey	Nominated	
Outer Critics Circle Awards	2025	Outstanding Lighting Design	Ben Stanton	Nominated	
Outer Critics Circle Awards	2025	Outstanding Sound Design	Peter Hylenski	Nominated	
Tony Awards	2025	Best Musical	Maybe Happy Ending	Won	
Tony Awards	2025	Best Leading Actor in a Musical	Darren Criss	Won	
Tony Awards	2025	Best Direction of a Musical	Michael Arden	Won	
Tony Awards	2025	Best Book of a Musical	Will Aronson and Hue Park	Won	
Tony Awards	2025	Best Original Score	Will Aronson and Hue Park	Won	
Tony Awards	2025	Best Orchestrations	Will Aronson	Nominated	
Tony Awards	2025	Best Costume Design of a Musical	Clint Ramos	Nominated	
Tony Awards	2025	Best Lighting Design of a Musical	Ben Stanton	Nominated	
Tony Awards	2025	Best Scenic Design of a Musical	Dane Laffrey and George Reeve	Won	
Tony Awards	2025	Best Sound Design of a Musical	Peter Hylenski	Nominated	
Korea Musical Awards	2026	Best Musical: More than 400 seats	Maybe Happy Ending	Won	
