= Jeanine Tesori =

American composer and musical arranger (born 1961)

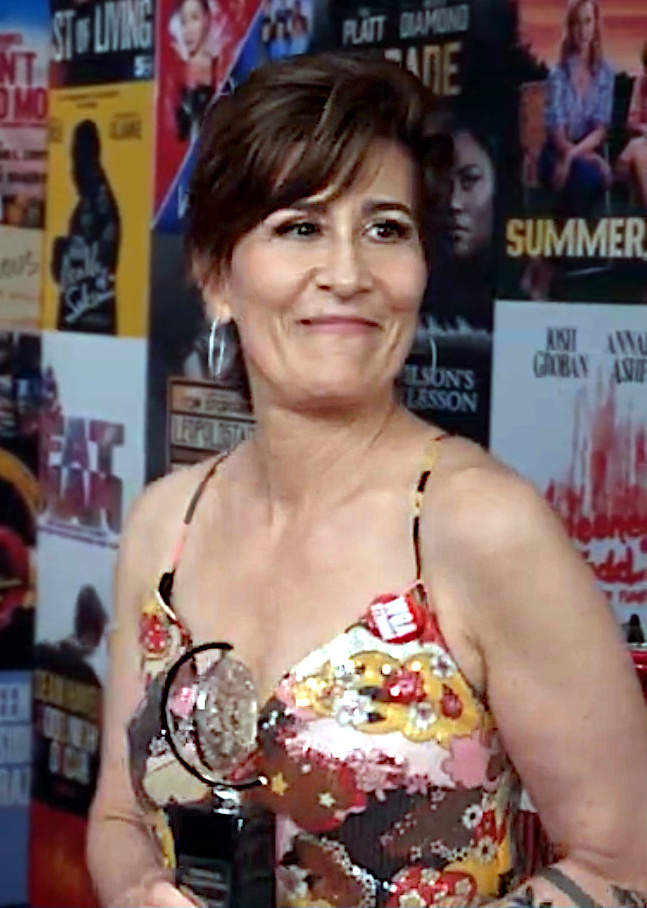
- Tesori at the 76th Tony Awards in 2023
- Born: 1961 (age 64–65); Port Washington, New York, United States
- Education: Barnard College (BA)
- Musical career
- Genres: Musical Theatre
- Occupations: Composer, Musical Arranger
- Years active: 1995–present

Jeanine Tesori, known earlier in her career as Jeanine Levenson, (born 1961) is an American composer and musical arranger best known for her work in the theater. She is the most prolific and honored female theatrical composer in history, with six Broadway musicals, six Tony Award nominations, and five Grammy Award nominations for Best Musical Theater Album. She won the 1999 Drama Desk Award for Outstanding Music in a Play for Nicholas Hytner's production of Twelfth Night at Lincoln Center, the 2004 Drama Desk Award for Outstanding Music for Caroline, or Change, the 2015 Tony Award for Best Original Score for Fun Home (shared with Lisa Kron), making them the first female writing team to win that award, and the 2023 Tony Award for Best Original Score for Kimberly Akimbo (shared with David Lindsay-Abaire). She was named a Pulitzer Prize for Drama finalist twice for Fun Home and Soft Power.

Her major works include Kimberly Akimbo; Fun Home; Caroline, or Change; Shrek the Musical; Thoroughly Modern Millie; and Violet.

== Early life and education ==
Tesori saw her first Off-Broadway production, Godspell at the Promenade, when she was fourteen. She said of the experience that she felt the sense of "I'm someplace where there's something happening, and I don't want to be anywhere else." She worked at Stagedoor Manor, a performing arts summer camp.

Tesori was raised Roman Catholic on Long Island. She attended Paul D. Schreiber High School in Port Washington, New York. She is a graduate of Barnard College, where she initially was pre-med but changed her major to music.

== Career ==
Tesori began her career as the substitute assistant conductor for the 1989 production of Gypsy. She made her credited Broadway debut as the dance arranger, associate conductor and keyboard player for The Secret Garden in 1991. Soon after, she was the associate conductor and played keyboard for the original production of The Who's Tommy, working with frequent collaborator, Des McAnuff. Tesori eventually music directed the German production of the musical, which she says gave her the courage to continue music directing. Tesori says she drew from her experience working on Tommy while writing Fun Home, and that it gave her the idea for how to bring her protagonist into her own story. She arranged the dance music for the 1995 revival of How to Succeed in Business Without Really Trying. Tesori worked as an arranger on the musical revue Dream when she became pregnant with her first child. While pregnant, Tesori also did the incidental music arrangements and dance arrangements for the 1998 production of The Sound of Music. Tesori struggled with the fact that she "worked so hard to hide the fact that (she) had a uterus", and was then arriving to rehearsals pregnant.

In 1997 she composed the score for the Off-Broadway musical Violet, for which she won an Obie Award, the New York Drama Critics Circle Award for Best Musical, and the Lucille Lortel Award for Outstanding Musical.

Tesori was asked to write the score for the 1998 production of Twelfth Night after being introduced to Nicholas Hytner by Ira Weitzman. Hytner heard her score for Violet and asked her to write 60 minutes of music for the production, with 3 months to complete the score. Despite scores for plays not typically being nominated for best score at the Tony Awards, Thomas Cott ensured that people considered it, and Tesori was nominated in 1999. Next, Tesori wrote the arrangements for Swing!

In 2000, Tesori joined forces with lyricist Dick Scanlan to write eleven new songs for a stage adaptation of Thoroughly Modern Millie. A successful run at the La Jolla Playhouse in San Diego resulted in a transfer to Broadway in 2002, and Tesori was nominated for the Tony Award for Best Original Score and the Drama Desk Award for Outstanding Music.

Tesori has collaborated with Tony Kushner four times. In 2004 she supplied music for the sung-through musical Caroline, or Change, which garnered her a third Tony nomination for Best Original Score. In 2006 she wrote incidental music for Kushner's new translation of Bertolt Brecht's Mother Courage and Her Children, which was produced as part of the 2006 Shakespeare in the Park season staged at the Delacorte Theater by The Public Theater. In the summer of 2011, their opera A Blizzard on Marblehead Neck premiered at Glimmerglass. In 2019, Tesori was credited as voice coach on the new Steven Spielberg film of West Side Story for which Kushner wrote the screenplay based largely on the original stage musical. Filmed over two months in and around New York City, the film saw its 2020 release rescheduled to December 2021 due to the COVID-19 pandemic.

Tesori has composed music for the films Nights in Rodanthe, The Loss of a Teardrop Diamond, The Little Mermaid: Ariel's Beginning, Shrek the Third, Mulan II, and The Emperor's New Groove 2: Kronk's New Groove.

Tesori wrote the music for Shrek the Musical, which opened on Broadway in 2008 and for which she earned both Tony and Drama Desk Award nominations for her music.

In 2011, she wrote the music to Fun Home with a book and lyrics by Lisa Kron, a musical based on the memoir by Alison Bechdel. The show was overseen by Philip Himberg while being workshopped at the Sundance Institute's 2011 Theatre Lab at White Oaks Lab in Yulee, Florida. It was previously developed during the 2009 Ojai Playwrights Conference. Fun Home opened Off-Broadway at The Public Theater on October 17, 2013, and sold out through November 4, 2013, with numerous extensions until it closed there on January 12, 2014. Here, it also won the 2014 Obie Award for Musical Theatre. Following the successful Off-Broadway run, the show transferred to Broadway at Circle in the Square Theatre, with previews beginning on March 27, 2015, and an official opening on April 19, 2015. Tesori and Kron won Tony Awards for Best Musical and Best Original Score for Fun Home, marking the first time an all-female composing team won either category. The musical was named a 2014 Pulitzer Prize for Drama finalist.

Tesori was the artistic director of a concert series of Off-Broadway musicals, "Encores! Off-Center". The July 2013 season included The Cradle Will Rock, I'm Getting My Act Together and Taking It on the Road, and Violet. It was also in this role that Tesori recruited Jake Gyllenhaal to play Seymour in the 2015 Encores! production of Little Shop of Horrors.

Tesori's opera The Lion, The Unicorn, and Me premiered with the Washington National Opera at the Kennedy Center in December 2013. The libretto is by J. D. McClatchy, based on the children's book by Jeanette Winterson and was directed by Francesca Zambello.

The English version of three songs in the 2016 Tokyo DisneySea stage show Out of Shadowland were written by Tesori. They were sung in Japanese by pop singer Angela Aki.

With book and lyrics by David Henry Hwang, Tesori's new musical Soft Power began performances at the Ahmanson Theatre in Los Angeles in May 2018 and at San Francisco's Curran Theatre in June. The musical opened Off-Broadway at the Public Theater on September 14, 2019, directed by Leigh Silverman. The musical was named a 2020 Pulitzer Prize for Drama finalist.

In July 2019, she premiered her opera Blue, with libretto by Tazewell Thompson, at the Glimmerglass Festival in Cooperstown, New York. The opera concerns the issue of African American boys having become a prime target of police brutality in the United States.

In December 2021, her new musical, Kimberly Akimbo, with book and lyrics by David Lindsay-Abaire opened at the Linda Gross Theater in Manhattan. It won Best Musical at the Drama Desk Awards, Lucille Lortel Awards, and Outer Critics Circle Awards. It transferred to Broadway in fall 2022, with previews beginning on October 12, and an official opening on November 10. She and Lindsay-Abaire won the Tony Award for Best Original Score (making Tesori the first female composer to win that award twice) and the show itself won Best Musical.

In October 2023, Tesori's opera Grounded opened at the Kennedy Center in Washington DC. It is a co-production with the Metropolitan Opera who originally commissioned the piece, and will start their 2024–2025 season.

== Personal life ==
Tesori married arranger and conductor Michael Rafter on September 30, 1994, in Italy. As of 2008, they lived with their child in Manhattan. By 2016, the couple had gotten divorced.

== Stage ==
- Violet (1997), a musical
- Twelfth Night (1998)
- The First Picture Show (1999), a musical
- Thoroughly Modern Millie (2000)
- Caroline, or Change (2003)
- Mother Courage and Her Children (2006)
- Shrek the Musical (2008)
- A Blizzard on Marblehead Neck (2011)
- Fun Home (2013)
- The Lion, The Unicorn, and Me (2013), an opera
- Soft Power (2018)
- Blue (2019), an opera
- Kimberly Akimbo (2021)
- Grounded (2023), an opera

== Awards and nominations ==
=== Tony Awards ===
Year	Award	Show	Result
1999	Best Original Score	Twelfth Night	Nominated
2002	Best Original Score (with Dick Scanlan)	Thoroughly Modern Millie	Nominated
2004	Best Original Score (with Tony Kushner)	Caroline, or Change	Nominated
2009	Best Original Score (with David Lindsay-Abaire)	Shrek the Musical	Nominated
2015	Best Original Score (with Lisa Kron)	Fun Home	Won
2023	Best Original Score (with David Lindsay-Abaire)	Kimberly Akimbo	Won

=== Drama Desk Awards ===
Year	Award	Show	Result
1997	Outstanding Music	Violet	Nominated
1999	Outstanding Music In A Play	Twelfth Night	Won
2002	Outstanding Music	Thoroughly Modern Millie	Nominated
2004	Outstanding Music	Caroline, or Change	Won
2009	Outstanding Music	Shrek the Musical	Nominated
2014	Outstanding Music	Fun Home	Nominated
2020	Outstanding Music	Soft Power	Nominated
2022	Outstanding Music	Kimberly Akimbo	Nominated

=== Pulitzer Prize for Drama ===
Year	Show	Result
2014	Fun Home (with Lisa Kron)	Finalist
2020	Soft Power (with David Henry Hwang)	Finalist

=== Grammy Award ===
Year	Award	Show	Result
2003	Best Musical Theater Album	Thoroughly Modern Millie (Original Broadway Cast)	Nominated
2010	Best Musical Theater Album	Shrek the Musical (Original Cast)	Nominated
2021	Best Musical Theater Album	Soft Power (Original Cast)	Nominated
2023	Best Musical Theater Album	Caroline, or Change (New Broadway Cast)	Nominated
2024	Best Musical Theater Album	Kimberly Akimbo (Original Broadway Cast)	Nominated
