= Johnny Guitar (musical) =

2004 stage musical

- Music: Martin Silvestri
- Lyrics: Joel Higgins
- Book: Nicholas van Hoogstraten
- Basis: Johnny Guitar by Phillip Yordan; Ben Maddow; Johnny Guitar by Roy Chanslor
- Premiere: March 23, 2004: Century Center For The Performing Arts
- Productions: 2004 (Off-Broadway)

Johnny Guitar is a 2004 stage musical with music by Martin Silvestri, lyrics by Joel Higgins, and a book by Nicholas van Hoogstraten. The musical is based on the 1953 novel by Roy Chanslor, that also inspired the 1954 film of the same name which starred Joan Crawford in the lead role.

== Synopsis ==
The musical is set in a small town in the New Mexico mountains circa 1885. The story centers on Vienna, a sultry saloonkeeper who built a booming business on her back. Though Vienna is the ultimate ‘bad girl gone good,’ her nemesis, the pent-up Emma, sees things differently. A domineering cattle baroness, Emma controls the town with an iron fist but loses her grip when she falls for the dangerously hot-headed Dancin’ Kid. By the time Johnny Guitar, a tall manly stranger with a secret past rides into town, the stage is set for an epic showdown, unlike anything the Old West or Off-Broadway has ever seen.

== Original cast and characters ==
Character	Off-Broadway 2004
Vienna	Judy McLane
Emma Small	Ann Crumb
Johnny Guitar	Steve Blanchard
The Dancin' Kid	Robert Evan
John McIvers	Ed Sala
Turkey Ralston	Robb Sapp
Bart Lonergan / Old Tom	David Sinkus
Eddie	Jason Edwards

== Musical numbers ==
- "Johnny Guitar" –
- "Let It Spin" –
- "Branded a Tramp" –
- "Old Santa Fe" -
- "What's In It For Me?" –
- "Who Do They Think They Are?" –
- "Welcome Home" –
- "Tell Me a Lie" –
- "The Gunfighter" –
- "We've Had Our Moments" –
- "Bad Blood" –

An original cast album was released in 2004.

== Productions ==
The original production started previews on March 9, 2004, at the Century City Center for the Performing Arts. A previous workshop was done in 2002 with Michele Pawk and Joanna Glushak.

The original production was well received by critics, and nominated for several awards including the Drama Desk Award for Outstanding Musical, Lucille Lortel Award for Best Musical, and The Drama League Award for Best Musical. McClane was also nominated for Outstanding Actress in a Musical. The show won the Outer Critics Circle Award for Outstanding New Off-Broadway Musical

The musical has been staged around the world by regional theatres and schools. It was produced by Boston Center for the Arts in Boston in 2004. In 2006, a production premiered in Southern California at La Mirada Theatre for the Performing Arts.
