= Hue Park =

South Korean lyricist and Playwright

- 박천휴
- Born: 1983 (age 42–43); Seoul, South Korea
- Other name: Park Chun-hue
- Citizenship: South Korea
- Education: Dongguk University; New York University
- Occupations: Musical theatre playwright Lyricist
- Years active: 2003–present
- Notable work: Maybe Happy Ending

Korean name
- Hangul: 박천휴
- RR: Bak Cheonhyu
- MR: Pak Ch'ŏnhyu

Hue Park (born Park Chun-hue; Korean: 박천휴) is a South Korean lyricist and musical theatre writer.

== Early career as lyricist ==
Park started working as an in-house lyricist for Music Cube while attending Dongguk University for creative writing. (Note: now merged with the Korean Literature program) He debuted as a lyricist with works such as Evan's Pain Reliever and Park Sang-min's Tough Life. He subsequently moved to New York City to study visual art at New York University, where he met composer Will Aronson.

== Works in musical theatre ==
In July 2012, Park wrote lyrics for the Bungee Jump (music by Will Aronson). The show was successful, earning Aronson and Park considerable recognition. For the second production of Bungee Jump in 2013, Park collaborated with Aronson on adapting the script.

He also adapted, translated, and wrote Korean lyrics for the musical Carmen, which opened at LG Art Center in December 2013. Park received the Best Music/Lyrics Award at Korea's 2013 Musical Awards for Bungee Jump. The musical was also named one of "the 2 Best Original Musicals of 2012" by The Musical magazine and was selected for re-production by the Korean Musical Association's original musical support program.

He went on to write the script and lyrics for The Schwarz Show: Christmas Radio within the omnibus musical I Hate Christmas in Project Box SEEYA.

In 2016, he translated and wrote Korean lyrics for The Bodyguard Musical, which also opened at LG Art Center.

In September 2015, Park and Aronson presented a try-out production of their new musical, Maybe Happy Ending, at Wooran Foundation. The musical had its official premiere in December 2016, produced by DaeMyoung Culture Factory. The show achieved remarkable success, winning six Korean Musical Awards, including accolades for Best Music, Lyrics, and Book. Additionally, the English-language version of Maybe Happy Ending received the prestigious 2017 Richard Rodgers Award from the American Academy of Arts and Letters. Following its initial run, a new Korean production of the musical opened in 2018. In 2020, Maybe Happy Ending had its highly anticipated American premiere at the Alliance Theatre in Atlanta, running from January 18 to February 16.

The musical Il Tenore is co-produced, composed, and arranged by Park and Will Aronson. It is inspired by the life of Lee In-seon, a doctor and tenor who holds a significant place in Korean opera history.

== Graphic design and writing ==
- Published a photoessay book, Polaroidiary (2011)
- Designed the title art and poster for Bungee Jump, the poster for Omnibus Musical I Hate Christmas, the cover for The Musical Magazine, among other graphic design projects.
- Wrote articles and reviews as New York correspondent for The Musical Magazine (2014)

== Accolades ==
List of Awards and nominations
Award ceremony	Year	Category	Winner	Result	Ref.
Asia Game Changer Awards	2025	Asia Game Changer Awards	Maybe Happy Ending Will Aronson and Hue Park	Won	
Chabumseok Play Award	2024	Musical Script Category	Il Tenore Will Aronson and Hue Park	Won	
Dorian Awards	2025	Outstanding Broadway Musical	Maybe Happy Ending	Won	
Drama Desk Awards	2025	Outstanding Musical	Maybe Happy Ending	Won	
Drama Desk Awards	2025	Outstanding Music	Will Aronson and Hue Park	Won	
Drama Desk Awards	2025	Outstanding Lyrics	Will Aronson and Hue Park	Won	
Drama Desk Awards	2025	Outstanding Book of a Musical	Will Aronson and Hue Park	Won	
Drama League Awards	2025	Outstanding Production of a Musical	Maybe Happy Ending	Won	
E-Daily Culture Awards	2021	Grand Prize	Maybe Happy Ending	Won	
Grammy Award	2026	Best Musical Theater Album	Maybe Happy Ending	Nominated	
Korea Musical Awards	2013	Best Music/Lyrics Award	Bungee Jump Will Aronson and Hue Park	Won	
Korea Musical Awards	2018	Best Musical: Small Theater	Maybe Happy Ending	Won	
Korea Musical Awards	2018	Screenwriter/Lyricist	Maybe Happy Ending	Won	
Korea Musical Awards	2026	Best Musical: More than 400 seats	Maybe Happy Ending	Won	
New York Drama Critics' Circle Awards	2025	Best Musical	Will Aronson and Hue Park	Won	
Newsis K-Expo Cultural Awards	2025	Seoul Mayor's Award	Hue Park	Won	
Outer Critics Circle Awards	2025	Outstanding New Broadway Musical	Maybe Happy Ending	Won	
Outer Critics Circle Awards	2025	Outstanding Book of a Musical	Maybe Happy Ending	Won	
Outer Critics Circle Awards	2025	Outstanding New Score	Maybe Happy Ending	Won	
Richard Rodgers Award by the American Academy of Arts and Letters	2017	Production Award	What I Learned from People (Note: Early English version of Maybe Happy Ending)	Won	
Tony Awards	2025	Best Musical	Maybe Happy Ending	Won	
Tony Awards	2025	Best Book of a Musical	Will Aronson and Hue Park	Won	
Tony Awards	2025	Best Original Score	Will Aronson and Hue Park	Won	
Yegreen Musical Awards	2017	Musical of the Year (small theatre)	Maybe Happy Ending	Won	

=== State honors ===
Name of country, name of award ceremony or organization, year given, and name of honor
Country	Ceremony or Organization	Year	Honor or Award	Ref.
South Korea	Arts and Culture Development Meritorious Service Awards Ceremony	2025	Today's Young Artist Award; Play Category	
