= The Other Josh Cohen =

2012 musical

The Other Josh Cohen is a 2012 musical comedy with book, music, and lyrics by Steve Rosen and David Rossmer. The musical was nominated for six Drama Desk Awards in 2013 and the Lucille Lortel Award for Outstanding Musical.

== Synopsis ==
Caught in a lifelong battle with bad luck, Josh Cohen arrives at his apartment where he discovers he's being robbed of everything except a Neil Diamond CD. With Valentine's Day quickly approaching, Josh has no furniture, no girlfriend, and no self-confidence. However, when Josh receives a letter and $56,000 check from a woman who might be his relative (thanks to his "immigrant horndog" great-grandfather), his luck, perspective, and financial prospects might be changing -- if the gift is really for him and if Josh can even morally accept it.

== Production history ==
The Other Josh Cohen began as a few performances at the New York Musical Theater Festival under the title "V-Day" in 2010 before making its premiere on October 10, 2012 at the SoHo Playhouse where it garnered enthusiastic reviews. The show ran from October 21-November 11 produced by Amas Musical Theatre and in association with Scandobean Productions, LLC. Directed by Ted Sperling, the production also starred Steve Rosen and David Rossmer with a cast composed of Hannah Elless, Vadim Feichtner, Ken Triwush, and Kate Wetherhead. In addition to playing dozens of other characters, most of the original cast notably doubled as band members.

The Other Josh Cohen then transferred to the Paper Mill Playhouse where it ran from February 19 - March 16, 2014 with much of the original cast intact.

On January 17, 2018, The Other Josh Cohen opened at Geva Theatre Center in Steve Rosen's hometown of Rochester, New York. Rosen returned to his role, with Alan Schmuckler as "Narrator Josh" and direction by Hunter Foster.

On October 26, 2018, it began previews at the Westside Theatre Upstairs where The Other Josh Cohen ran for six months, closing on April 7, 2019. Steve Rosen, David Rossmer, Hannah Elless, and Kate Wetherhead all returned to their original roles, with direction again by Hunter Foster. It was nominated for the 2019 Off-Broadway Alliance Award for Best Musical Revival.

== Musical numbers ==
Musical numbers in the Studio Cast Recording include:

1. Only the Beginning
2. One CD
3. My Best Day
4. Neil Life
5. Samuel Cohen's Family Tree
6. Manly Purple Tie
7. Tonight of All Nights
8. What If
9. The Other Josh Cohen
10. Hang On
11. Change a Thing
