= Wings (musical) =

Wings is a musical with music by Jeffrey Lunden and book and lyrics by Arthur Perlman adapted from Arthur Kopit's play of the same name.

The one-act musical concerns an older female stroke victim who was an aviatrix and wing-walker.

The original production premiered at Chicago's Goodman Theatre in October 1992 and opened at the New York Shakespeare Festival Joseph Papp Public Theater in February 1993.

Wings received the 1994 Lortel Award for Outstanding Musical.
