= White Girl in Danger =

2023 satirical stage musical by Michael R. Jackson

- Music: Michael R. Jackson
- Lyrics: Michael R. Jackson
- Book: Michael R. Jackson
- Premiere: April 10, 2023: Tony Kiser Theater, New York City
- Productions: 2023 off-Broadway

White Girl in Danger is a satirical musical written by Michael R. Jackson. The show was first produced off-Broadway at the Kiser Theater in New York City in 2023. Jackson originally developed the new musical intending for it to be part of a multi-year residency at the Vineyard Theatre.

The musical follows the citizens of Allwhite, a town filled with drama and intrigue worthy of, and blatantly satirizing, a daytime soap opera. Keesha Gibbs and the other “Blackgrounds” have been relegated to backburner stories of slavery and police violence for all of their lives. Keesha is determined to step out of her role and into the center of Allwhite's juiciest stories. While she claims to be making this shift for her people, the move really comes from her own self-interest in being a larger part of the story.

== Productions ==
=== Off-Broadway (2023) ===
Previews of White Girl in Danger began on March 15 at the Kiser Theater. The show was produced by Vineyard Theatre and Second Stage Theater. The show officially opened on April 10, 2023 and ran until May 21. The show was directed by Lileana Blain-Cruz and choreographed by Raja Feather Kelly. The original off-Broadway cast included:

- Keesha Gibbs - Latoya Edwards
- Nell Gibbs - Tarra Conner Jones
- Megan White - Molly Hager
- Meagan Whitehead - Lauren Marcus
- Maegan Whitehall - Alyse Alan Louis
- Diane/Barbara/Judith - Liz Lark Brown
- Matthew Scott/Scott Matthew/Zack Paul Gosselar - Eric William Morris
- Florence - Kayla Davion
- Abilene - Jennifer Fouché
- Caroline - Morgan Siobhan Green
- Tarik Blackwell - Vincent Jamal Hooper
- Clarence - James Jackson Jr.

== Songs ==
- “Allwhite”
- ”White Girl in Danger”
- ”Basic”
- ”Matthew Scott”
- ”Scott Matthew”
- ”Zach Paul Gosselar”
- ”Stay in My Lane”
- ”Let’s Party”
- ”Mom’s Gonna Kill Mih”
- “Run Away From Home”
- “Run Away From Home Reprise”
- ”Stealin’ My Thunder”
- “The Anti-Allwhite Diamond Fashion Show”
- ”Allwhite Men”
- “The Killer Still Hasn’t Come for Me/White Girl in Danger Reprise”
- ”Lesbian Lesbian Sex Sex Sex”
- ”I Know Which Way My Semen Will Flow”
- ”Outrun the Story”
- “Why I Kill”
- ”Struggle Sang”
- ”Centering Myself”
- ”Black Woman in the Driver’s Seat”

=== Recordings ===
The original cast recording was released on March 29, 2024.

== Awards and nominations ==
During its off-Broadway run, White Girl in Danger received five Drama Desk Award nominations: Outstanding Musical, Outstanding Featured Performance in a Musical, Outstanding Music, Outstanding Lyrics, and Outstanding Projection and Video Design.

The show was also nominated for three Drama League Awards: Outstanding Production of a Musical, Outstanding Direction of a Musical, and Distinguished Performance.
