= Lizard Boy: The Musical =

Musical

- Off-Broadway official artwork
- Music: Justin Huertas
- Lyrics: Justin Huertas
- Book: Justin Huertas
- Setting: A fantasy version of Seattle, Washington
- Premiere: March 27, 2015: Seattle, WA, USA
- Productions: 2016 San Diego, CA, USA; 2021 Silicon Valley, CA, USA; 2022 Manchester, UK; 2022 Edinburgh, UK; 2022 Cincinnati, OH, USA; 2023 Off-Broadway; 2023 Edmonton, AB, Canada; 2024 Hamburg, Germany; 2024 Ashland, OR, USA; 2025 Nashville, TN, USA; 2025 Boston, MA, USA; 2026 Portland, OR, USA; 2027 Minneapolis, MN, USA

Lizard Boy: The Musical is a Drama Desk-nominated indie-rock musical with book, lyrics and music by Justin Huertas. The musical follows the story of Trevor, a young man who has lizard scales for skin as he embarks on his first date in a year but winds up finding out he has superpowers and in a fight for his life.

Lizard Boy was originally commissioned by Jerry Manning the then artistic director of Seattle Repertory Theatre in 2012 and premiered there in 2015. Its Original Cast Album was recorded in one day in 2015 in Seattle. The musical was inspired by works such as X-Men, Spider-Man and the 2006 musical Spring Awakening.

== Productions ==
=== World Premiere ===
Lizard Boy made its world premiere on March 27, 2015 at the Seattle Repertory Theatre. It featured writer Justin Huertas in the role of Trevor, William A. Williams as Cary and Kirsten "Kiki" deLohr Helland as Siren, and was directed by Brandon Ivie.

=== U.S. Regional Productions ===
In the following season, 2016–2017, the show ran at the Diversionary Theatre in San Diego from September 29, 2016 to November 6, 2016.

Supported by commercial theatre producers, the show opened Theaterworks Silicon Valley's 2021–2022 season. It ran in the Mountain View Center for the Performing Arts in Silicon Valley from October 9, 2021 to October 31, 2021.

=== United Kingdom ===
The following summer, a 60-minute version of the show starring the original cast ran in the United Kingdom, first at the Hope Mill Theatre in Manchester, UK, from July 14, 2022 to July 27, 2022 and subsequently at the Edinburgh Fringe Festival from August 2, 2022 to August 28, 2022. The alternate performers include Anthony Rickman as Trevor, Sophie Reid as Siren, and Alan Cammish as Cary.

=== Off-Broadway ===
The show had its New York City premiere from June 1, 2023 to July 1, 2023 at Theatre Row on 42nd St. The show was produced in conjunction with Prospect Theatre Company, directed by Brandon Ivie, and starred the original cast from the Seattle Repertory Theatre production.

=== Oregon Shakespeare Festival ===
The show ran from June 11, 2024 to October 11, 2024, in a production starring the original cast at the storied Oregon Shakespeare Festival in Ashland, Oregon.

=== North America ===
From November 18, 2022 to December 11, 2022, Know Theatre (Cincinnati, Ohio; USA) performed the first licensed production without the original cast from November 18, 2022 to December 11, 2022. The cast consisted of Jaron Crawford as Trevor, Ian Timothy Forsgren as Cary, and Erin McCamley as Siren.

From August 17, 2023 to August 23, 2023, Viastrat Productions (Edmonton, Canada) licensed and produced the show in the Edmonton Fringe Festival Canada with a cast including David Son as Trevor, Doran Werner as Cary, and Erin McLean as Siren.

From June 13, 2025 to June 28, 2025, Street Theatre Co (Nashville, Tennessee, USA) starring Eklan Singh as Trevor, Delaney Amatrudo as Siren, and Shane Kopischke as Cary.

From October 24 to November 22, 2025 the musical was produced in Boston by Speakeasy Stage. The show starred Keiji Ishiguri, who was the assistant music director of Lizard Boy Off-Broadway, as Trevor, Chelsie Nectow as Siren, and Peter Dimaggio as Cary.

From March 1 to March 29 2026, the show was produced by Portland Center Stage in Portland, Oregon, USA starring Milo J. Marami, the alternate Trevor Off-Broadway and at the Oregon Shakespeare Festival, Lo Steele as Siren, and Benjamin Tissell as Cary with Michael Feldman and Ashley Song as understudies.

A casting call revealed that Lizard Boy will be performed at Theatre Latte Da in Minneapolis, MN, USA beginning January 7, 2027. The cast is to be announced.

=== International Productions ===
From April 22, 2024 to June 22, 2024, the show ran at the English Theater of Hamburg (Hamburg, Germany) in a production directed by Paul Glaser featuring Peter Tabornal as Trevor, Jacob Bedford as Cary, and Sophie Earl as Siren.

== Synopsis (2015 Version) ==
Trevor, a young man with green lizard scales on his skin, sits in his room and laments a failed relationship, attributing the breakup to his scales ("Trevor's Song"). Tired, he takes a nap and dreams of a strange woman singing hauntingly to him ("Overture"). When he awakens, he decides to download Grindr and soon receives a message from a stranger named Cary ("4th and Vine"). He contemplates his life so far ("Things I Want") and decides to agree to meet Cary.

When he arrives at Cary's apartment, Cary immediately starts flirting with him. However, he accidentally assumes that Trevor's scales are a costume for "Monster Fest" (the festival the city is celebrating that day), causing Trevor to feel insulted and leave. Desperate for him to stay, Cary improvises a song ("Cary's Song") and is able to convince Trevor to come back to his apartment. In Cary's apartment, Trevor sees a magazine with the face of the "Dream Girl" on the cover.

The scene flashes forward to the "Dream Girl" (Siren) performing "A Terrible Ride". When she finishes her set, she goes backstage and a curious Trevor follows, leaving Cary alone. Starstruck, Trevor asks if he can perform a song for her and she agrees.

The scene returns to Cary's apartment where the two men share a drink. Cary, being new to town, asks what Monster Fest is. Trevor reluctantly explains that it is a celebration of the defeat of the dragon that terrorised the city 20 years ago ("Recess"). He also mentions that when said Dragon was decapitated, Trevor and five other children wound up covered in its blood, which caused the scales to develop on his skin.

The scene returns to the club, where Siren is impatiently asking Trevor to perform. Simultaneously, Cary's conversation with Trevor plays, and both Siren and Cary urge Trevor to sing. Feeling confident, he plays ("Another Part of Me"), causing both Siren and Cary to feel a sense of connection to him.

As Siren and Trevor talk, Siren realises who Trevor really is and explains that she too is one of 6 children involved in the dragon incident. She explains that all the children involved developed superpowers. She believes that the dragons will return and overrun the city this year and enlists Trevor's help in defeating them ("A Myth to Live By").

Trevor refuses, stating that he is powerless, and decides to leave and find Cary. Siren threatens to kill him to obtain his powers if he doesn't help her just like she did to all the other children. When Trevor still tries to leave, she stops him with her "siren song". Fighting hard, Trevor is able to break free and leave but Siren makes chase.

Trevor finds Cary at a diner, eating by himself. When he tries to apologise, Cary dismisses him confessing how betrayed he felt when Trevor left with no explanation. Trevor once again tries to apologise, this time stating his faults and confessing that he sincerely wants to be friends with Cary ("Things I Worry About"). Cary accepts his apology and they decide to continue their date at the park ("The Woah Song"). Trevor goes in to kiss Cary, but suddenly feels a sharp pain on his back.

When he goes to check, he realises that there is a spike on his back that cut Cary and sees that he also accidentally cut one of his own fingers off while checking. Cary gets a bit woozy at the sight of the blood. Trevor mistakes the reaction for disgust because of his appearance and accuses Cary of being shallow and leaves. As he goes Cary reminds Trevor that he's being just as judgemental as he assumes others are ("Truth is What Matters"). As Cary leaves, Siren sees and captures him.

As Trevor heads home, he resolves to never leave his apartment again ("Lizard Boy"). As he reflects on the night, he realises he's about to throw away the only chance at a genuine friendship with someone who accepts him as he is. At the same time, he accidentally finds that he has telekinetic powers when he lifts a trash can with his mind. In this moment he decides to finally accept himself as he is.

He gets a text from Cary asking to meet at the Park again ("Sculpture Park"). He suddenly discovers that he is able to communicate with Siren on the astral plane and reveals that she was actually catfishing him using Cary's phone. She threatens to kill Cary causing Trevor to rush back to the park ("Take Me to Bed").

When he arrives at the park, Siren once again asks him to help her fight against the dragon, but he refuses again, still not believing her Dragon theory. He asks her why she murdered the others and she reveals that she did so to obtain their powers because they all refused to help her.

The two get in a big fight where Siren uses a body-controlled Cary to fight Trevor. Trevor does his best to dodge all the attacks ("The Fight"). Siren finally decides to make Cary turn his knife on himself, causing Trevor to suddenly yell out his own siren song to stop her. Unfortunately, he faints due to the strain. When he wakes up, Cary offers him a hand. But before he realises something is wrong, Cary stabs him and shapeshifts back into Siren. When the real Cary comes to Trevor's rescue, Siren knocks him out.

Before Siren can obtain Trevor's Powers, giant green wings sprout from Trevor's back and he rises off the ground, wounds healed. When Siren makes a final attempt to kill Trevor, their siren songs clash and Siren gets blasted against a wall and passes out. Trevor rushes over to Cary and mourns his loss ("I Was Gonna Call You Tomorrow"). Suddenly, Cary bursts back to life, having had some of Trevor's healing ability transferred to him by his spilt blood.

As the sun rises, the two hear a rumbling in the distance. The dragons have actually come. Trevor and Cary stand hand-in-hand and Siren rises to her feet and the three share a look and charge into battle.

== Cast and characters ==
Character	Seattle (2015)	San Diego (2016)	Silicon Valley (2021)	Manchester (2022)	Edinburgh (2022)	Off-Broadway (2023)	Oregon Shakespeare Festival (2024)	English Theatre of Hamburg (2024)	Street Theatre Company (2025)	Speakeasy Stage (2025)	Portland Center Stage (2026)
Jason "Trevor" Reyes	Justin Huertas	Justin Huertas	Justin Huertas	Justin Huertas	Justin Huertas	Justin Huertas	Justin Huertas	Peter Tabornal	Eklan Singh	Keiji Ishiguri	Milo J. Marami
Siren	Kiki deLohr	Kiki deLohr	Kiki deLohr	Kiki deLohr	Kiki deLohr	Kiki deLohr	Kiki deLohr	Sophie Earl	Delaney Amatrudo	Chelsie Nectow	Lo Steele
Cary	William A. Williams	William A. Williams	William A. Williams	William A. Williams	William A. Williams	William A. Williams	William A. Williams	Jacob Bedford	Shane Kopischke	Peter Dimaggio	Benjamin Tissell
Alternate Trevor	did not appear	did not appear	did not appear	Anthony Rickman	Anthony Rickman	Milo J. Marami	Milo J. Marami	did not appear	did not appear	did not appear	Ashley Song
Alternate Siren	did not appear	did not appear	did not appear	Sophie Reid	Sophie Reid	Kai An Chee	Sunday Saari	did not appear	did not appear	did not appear	Ashley Song
Alternate Cary	did not appear	did not appear	did not appear	Alan Cammish	Alan Cammish	Jacob Ryan Smith	Benjamin Camenzuli	did not appear	did not appear	did not appear	Michael Feldman

== Musical numbers ==
=== Original Cast Album (2016) ===
- "Trevor's Song"- Trevor
- "Overture"- Siren
- "4th and Vine"- Cary & Trevor
- "Cary's Song"- Cary
- "A Terrible Ride"- Siren
- "Recess"- Trevor, Siren & Cary
- "Another Part of Me"- Trevor, Siren & Cary
- "Myth to Live By"- Trevor, Siren & Cary
- "Things I Worry About"* - Trevor
- "The Woah Song"- Trevor, Siren & Cary
- "Truth is What Matters" (previously known as "I Might Stay")- Trevor, Siren & Cary
- "Lizard Boy"- Trevor, Siren & Cary
- "Sculpture Park"- Trevor & Cary
- "Take Me to Bed"- Trevor, Siren & Cary
- "The Fight"- Siren

==== Bonus tracks ====
- "Don't Know Where to Go"- Trevor, Siren & Cary
- "Old Man"- Trevor, Siren & Cary

* Not included in original cast recording

=== Oregon Shakespeare Festival Score (2024-present) ===
The show went through various revisions over the years before the score was completely reworked by the original team for the Oregon Shakespeare Festival production. That score is not the definitive version that is used when the show is licensed.

- "He Dies At The End"- Trevor, Siren, Cary
- "Maybe This Dude"- Trevor, Siren, Cary
- "4th and Vine"- Trevor, Cary
- "Willy-Nilly" - Trevor, Siren, Cary
- "Cary's Song"- Cary
- "Passenger Seat"- Trevor, Siren, Cary
- "Time and Beer" - Trevor, Siren
- "A Terrible Ride"- Siren
- "Recess"- Trevor, Siren, Cary
- "Another Part of Me"- Trevor, Siren, Cary
- "Myth to Live By"- Trevor, Siren & Cary
- "A Terrible Reprise" - Siren
- "Things I Worry About"* - Trevor
- "The Woah Song"- Trevor, Siren, Cary
- "Lizard Boy" - Trevor, Siren, Cary
- "Sculpture Park"- Trevor, Siren, Cary
- "Run!" - Trevor, Siren, Cary
- "The Fight" - Trevor, Siren, Cary
- "Finale" - Trevor
- "Eleventh Hour" - Trevor, Siren, Cary

== Orchestration ==
All instrumental accompaniment in the original production was performed by the actors themselves and was incorporated into the performance.

- Cello
- Guitar
- Ukulele
- Piano
- Kazoo
- Melodica
- Glockenspiel
- Beatbox
- Drum case

== Awards and nominations ==
Year	Award	Category	Nominee	Result	Ref.
2015	Gregory Award	Outstanding New Play		Won	
2015	Gregory Award	Outstanding Actor (Musical)	Justin Huertas	Won	
2015	Gregory Award	Outstanding Supporting Actor (Musical)	William A. Williams	Won	
2015	Gregory Award	Outstanding Supporting Actress (Musical)	Kirsten deLohr Helland	Won	
2022	Bay Area Theater Critics Circle Awards	Lighting Design (in a house with 300+ seats)	Robert J. Aguilar	Won	
2022	Bay Area Theater Critics Circle Awards	Sound Design (in a house with 300+ seats)	Jeff Mockus	Won	
2022	Bay Area Theater Critics Circle Awards	Original Music	Justin Huertas	Nominated	
2022	Bay Area Theater Critics Circle Awards	Music Direction (in a house with 300+ seats)	Steven Tran	Nominated	
2022	Bay Area Theater Critics Circle Awards	Stage Direction (in a house with 300+ seats)	Brandon Ivie	Won	
2022	Bay Area Theater Critics Circle Awards	Ensemble Musical		Won	
2022	Bay Area Theater Critics Circle Awards	Principal Performance (Musical)	Justin Huertas	Won	
2022	Bay Area Theater Critics Circle Awards	Principal Performance (Musical)	William A. Williams	Nominated	
2022	Bay Area Theater Critics Circle Awards	Principal Performance (Musical)	Kirsten deLohr Helland	Nominated	
2022	Bay Area Theater Critics Circle Awards	Entire Production - SP		Won	
2024	Drama Desk Awards	Outstanding Musical		Nominated	
2024	Drama Desk Awards	Outstanding Book of a Musical	Justin Huertas	Nominated	
2024	Drama Desk Awards	Outstanding Music	Justin Huertas	Nominated	
