= Will Aronson =

American composer (born 1981)

William Landry Aronson
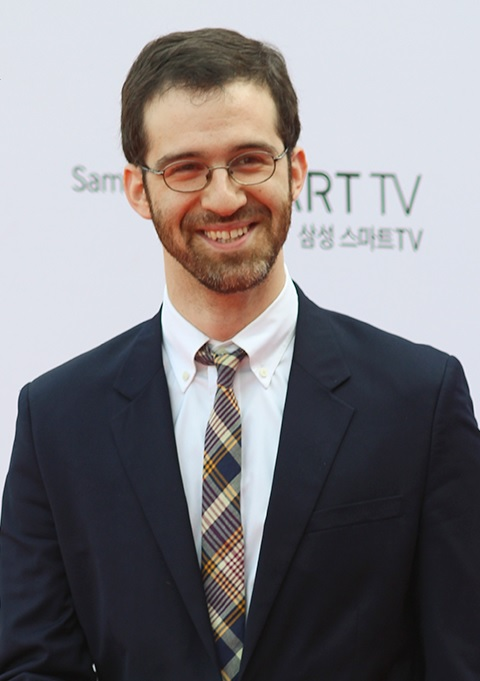
- Will Aronson on the red carpet of The Musical Awards, 3 June 2013

Background information
- Born: 1981 (age 44–45); New Haven, Connecticut, U.S.
- Genres: Musical theater
- Occupations: Composer; Writer
- Years active: 2008–present
- Website: www.willaronson.com

William Landry Aronson (born 1981) is an American composer and writer for musical theater.

Aronson's work includes the scores for Pete the Cat, Mother, Me & the Monsters, My Scary Girl, The Trouble with Doug, Bungee Jump, Hansel & Gretl & Heidi & Günter and Wind-Up Girl. With Hue Park, Aronson co-wrote Maybe Happy Ending, which won six Korean Musical Awards and 6 Tony Awards, including Best Original Score.

== Early life ==
Growing up in Guilford, Connecticut, Aronson began his career with piano lessons when he was eight years old. Additionally, he sang in the chorus at Elizabeth C. Adams Middle School.

He attended Guilford High School, where he played trombone in the jazz band and pit orchestra. He credits his experience in the jazz band and its participation in the Essentially Ellington Competition as part of the inspiration behind Maybe Happy Ending. He graduated in 2000.

== Education ==
Aronson holds a B.A. in music from Harvard University. As an undergraduate, Aronson was the composer of Hasty Pudding Theatricals' 154th production, Snow Place Like Home, and co-author/lyricist of its 155th production, It's a Wonderful Afterlife.

After graduation from Harvard, Aronson studied Music Theory as a Fulbright Scholar at Universität der Künste in Berlin.

Aronson holds an M.F.A. from the Graduate Musical Theatre Writing Program of the Tisch School of the Arts at New York University. While studying at NYU, he received the ASCAP Frederick Loewe Scholarship and a 2006 Baryshnikov Fellowship. In 2007 he was named by the Dramatists Guild of America as one of "50 to Watch".

== Work ==
Aronson is the recipient of the Tony Award, Richard Rodgers Award, a Fulbright grant, the ASCAP Frederick Loewe Award, an EST/Sloan grant, and three Korean Musical Awards.

In addition to his theatrical work, Aronson has composed and produced over 200 tracks for the ESL children's book/DVD series, English Egg.

Aronson wrote the score for a musical version of the Korean movie My Scary Girl (book and lyrics by Kyoung-ae Kang), which ran in Seoul, South Korea. The show won Best Original Musical (small theater category) at the 2009 Korea Musical Awards. An English-language version of the show, with book co-written by Mark St. Germain and additional lyrics by William Finn, ran at Barrington Stage Company's Stage II, July 10–26, 2008. The New York Musical Theater Festival (NYMF) presented the Korean version of My Scary Girl October 1–4, 2009. My Scary Girl was named the Outstanding New Musical at NYMF for 2009.

A reading of Aronson's musical The Trouble with Doug, co-written with Daniel Maté, was directed by Victoria Clark at the NAMT theater festival in 2010.

With William Finn as lyricist, Aronson has composed songs for Sybille Pearson’s play Next, Mary Testa’s Sleepless Variations, and Finn’s own Songs of Innocence and Experience. Aronson was the musical arranger for the Finn-Lapine musical Little Miss Sunshine performed at La Jolla Playhouse in 2011.

In 2011 Aronson composed the score for Mormons, Mothers and Monsters (book and lyrics by Sam Salmond), which ran at Barrington Stage Company's Stage II.

In 2012, Aronson wrote the score for the Korean musical Bungee Jump (lyrics by Hue Park), based on the 2001 film Bungee Jumping of Their Own. The production was successful and won the award for best score at the 7th Musical Awards and the 18th Korea Musical Awards. Other work with Hue Park includes Il Tenore and Ghost Bakery.

Park and Aronson had a try-out production of their new musical, Maybe Happy Ending, at Wooran Foundation in September 2015. The musical was premiered by DaeMyoung Culture Factory in December 2016. Directed by Kim Dong-yeon, The show won six Korean Musical Awards, including Best Director, Best Music, Lyrics and Book. The English-language version of Maybe Happy Ending was awarded the 2017 Richard Rodgers Award by the American Academy of Arts and Letters. A new Korean production opened in 2018. In 2020, Maybe Happy Ending had its American premiere at the Alliance Theatre in Atlanta. The show opened on Broadway at the Belasco Theatre in the fall of 2024 and received uniformly positive reviews. In 2025, the show won 6 Tony awards.

== Accolades ==
List of awards
Award ceremony	Year	Category	Winner	Result	Ref.
6th Yegreen Musical Award	2017	Musical of the Year	Maybe Happy Ending	Won	
6th Yegreen Musical Award	2017	Music Award	Will Aronson	Won	
Richard Rodgers Award by the American Academy of Arts and Letters	2017	Production Award	What I Learned from People (Note: early English version of Maybe Happy Ending)	Won	
2nd Korea Musical Awards	2018	Musical of The Year (Small Theater)	Maybe Happy Ending	Won	
2nd Korea Musical Awards	2018	Screenwriter/Lyricist	Will Aronson and Hue Park	Won	
2nd Korea Musical Awards	2018	Composer	Will Aronson	Won	
8th E-Daily Culture Awards	2021	Grand Prize	Maybe Happy Ending	Won	
New York Drama Critics' Circle Award	2025	Best Musical	Will Aronson and Hue Park	Won	
Drama Desk Awards	2025	Outstanding Musical	Maybe Happy Ending	Won	
Drama Desk Awards	2025	Outstanding Music	Will Aronson and Hue Park	Won	
Drama Desk Awards	2025	Outstanding Lyrics	Will Aronson and Hue Park	Won	
Drama Desk Awards	2025	Outstanding Book of a Musical	Will Aronson and Hue Park	Won	
Drama Desk Awards	2025	Outstanding Orchestrations	Will Aronson	Nominated	
Drama League Awards	2025	Outstanding Production of a Musical	Maybe Happy Ending	Won	
Outer Critics Circle Awards	2025	Outstanding New Broadway Musical	Maybe Happy Ending	Won	
Outer Critics Circle Awards	2025	Outstanding Book of a Musical	Will Aronson and Hue Park	Won	
Outer Critics Circle Awards	2025	Outstanding Score	Will Aronson and Hue Park	Won	
Outer Critics Circle Awards	2025	Outstanding Orchestrations	Will Aronson	Nominated	
Tony Awards	2025	Best Musical	Maybe Happy Ending	Won	
Tony Awards	2025	Best Book of a Musical	Will Aronson and Hue Park	Won	
Tony Awards	2025	Best Original Score	Will Aronson and Hue Park	Won	
Tony Awards	2025	Best Orchestrations	Will Aronson	Nominated	

== Personal life ==
By way of his father, Aronson is of Jewish descent.
