= MJ (album) =

Album of the stage musical MJ

MJ (Original Broadway Cast Recording)

Cast recording by the original Broadway cast of MJ the Musical
- Released: July 15, 2022
- Recorded: February 7–8, 2022
- Studio: Power Station at Berklee, NYC
- Genre: Pop; R&B; soul; Disco
- Length: 59:39
- Label: Sony
- Producer: David Holcenberg; Jason Michael Webb; Derik Lee (also co.); Lia Vollack (also exec.); John Branca (also exec.); John McClain (also exec.)

MJ (Original Broadway Cast Recording) is the cast album for the 2021 musical MJ, based on the life and music of the American singer Michael Jackson. The recording features Myles Frost, Ayana George, Christian Wilson, Tavon Olds-Sample, Antoine L. Smith, Apollo Levine, Quentin Earl Darrington, Whitney Bashor, Trey Campbell, Lamont Walker II, Raymond Baynard and Zelig Williams.

Recording took place on February 7 and 8, 2022. It was released on July 15, 2022. A snippet of Billie Jean was shared on May 19 by The New York Times in anticipation of the album. The album was nominated for a Grammy Award for Best Musical Theater Album, losing to Into the Woods.

== Track listing ==
Act One
No.	Title	Writer(s)	Performer(s)	Length
1.	"Beat It"	Michael Jackson	Myles Frost; John Edwards; Ayana George; Apollo Levine; Tavon Olds-Sample; Lamont Walker II	2:45
2.	"Jackson 5 Medley (The Love You Save / I Want You Back / ABC)"	The Corporation	Christian Wilson; Devin Trey Campbell; Edwards; Levine; Walker	3:28
3.	"I'll Be There"	Berry Gordy; Bob West; Willie Hutch; Hal Davis	Ayana George; Wilson; Frost	3:32
4.	"Don't Stop 'Til You Get Enough / Blame It on the Boogie / Dancing Machine"	Jackson; Mick Jackson; Dave Jackson; Elmar Krohn; Hal Davis; Don Fletcher; Dean Parks	Frost; Olds-Sample; Original Broadway Cast of MJ	5:32
5.	"Stranger in Moscow"	Jackson	Frost; Edwards; Ayana George; Levine; Olds-Sample; Walker	2:17
6.	"You Can't Win"	Charlie Smalls	Antoine L. Smith; Olds-Sample; Cast	1:59
7.	"I Can't Help It"	Stevie Wonder; Susaye Greene	Olds-Sample; Frost	2:28
8.	"Keep the Faith"	Jackson; Glen Ballard; Siedah Garrett	Levine; Olds-Sample; Edwards; George; Walker	1:31
9.	"Wanna Be Startin' Somethin'"	Jackson	Olds-Sample; Frost; Cast	2:33
10.	"Earth Song / They Don't Care About Us"	Jackson	Frost; Cast	3:36
Total length:				29:41

Act Two
No.	Title	Writer(s)	Performer(s)	Length
1.	"Billie Jean"	Jackson	Myles Frost; Edwards; George; Apollo Levine; Tavon Olds-Sample; Lamont Walker II	3:27
2.	"Smooth Criminal"	Jackson	Frost; Edwards; George; Levine; Olds-Sample; Walker	2:31
3.	"Victory Tour (For the Love Of Money / Can You Feel It)"	Jackson; Jackie Jackson; Kenneth Gamble; Leon Huff; Anthony Jackson	Quentin Earl Darrington; Olds-Sample; Raymond Baynard; Edwards; George; Levine; Walker; Zelig Williams	3:06
4.	"Keep the Faith (Reprise)"	Jackson; Ballard; Garrett	Frost; Darrington; Cast	1:49
5.	"She's Out of My Life"	Tom Bahler	Frost; Olds-Sample	2:58
6.	"Human Nature"	Steve Porcaro; John Bettis	Frost; Whitney Bashor; Cast	2:34
7.	"Bad / 2 Bad"	Jackson; Dallas Austin; Swedien; Moore	Frost; Cast	1:30
8.	"Thriller"	Rod Temperton	Frost; Christian Wilson; Darrington; Edwards; George; Levine; Olds-Sample; Walker	4:01
9.	"Man in the Mirror"	Glen Ballard, Siedah Garrett	Cast	4:07
10.	"Finale (Jam / Black or White / Wanna Be Startin' Somethin')"	Jackson; Rene; Swedien; Teddy Riley; Bill Bottrell	Cast	3:55
Total length:				29:58

== Personnel ==
Cast

- Myles Frost - Michael Jackson
- Ayana George - Katherine Jackson
- Christian Wilson - Little Michael
- Tavon Olds-Sample - Teenage Michael / Young Adult Michael
- Antoine L. Smith - Berry Gordy / Nick
- Apollo Levine - Quincy Jones / Tito Jackson
- Quentin Earl Darrington - Joe Jackson / Rob
- Whitney Bashor - Rachel
- Trey Campbell - Little Marlon
- John Edwards - Jackie Jackson
- Lamont Walker II - Jermaine Jackson

Ensemble vocals

- Raymond Baynard
- Zelig Williams.

Production

- Orchestrations - Jason Michael Webb & David Holcenberg
- Producer - Derik Lee
- Mixed - Alex Ghenea

Musicians

- Keyboards - Jason Michael Webb, Michael O. Mitchell
- Guitars - Alex Nolan, Jeffrey Lee Campbell
- Bass - Cheiton Grey
- Drums - Andrew Atkinson
- Percussion - Wilson Torres
- Reeds - Brandon Wright, Jason Curry
- Trumpet - Tony Kadleck, Brian Pareschi
- Trombone - Danny Hall

Additional musicians for recording

== Charts ==
=== Weekly charts ===
Chart (2022)	Peak position
US Cast Albums (Billboard)	1
UK	88

== Awards ==
Year	Award type	Categories	Results	Ref.
2023	Grammy Awards	Best Musical Theater Album	Nominated	
