= Tootsie (musical) =

2018 musical by David Yazbek and Robert Horn

- Music: David Yazbek
- Lyrics: David Yazbek
- Book: Robert Horn
- Basis: Tootsie by Larry Gelbart; Murray Schisgal; Don McGuire
- Premiere: September 11, 2018: Cadillac Palace Theatre
- Productions: 2018 Chicago; 2019 Broadway; 2021 US tour
- Awards: Tony Award for Best Book of a Musical

Tootsie is a musical comedy with music and lyrics by David Yazbek and a book by Robert Horn. The musical is based on the 1982 American comedy film of the same name written by Larry Gelbart, Murray Schisgal, and Don McGuire. The musical made its world premiere try-out at the Cadillac Palace Theatre in Chicago in September 2018. Like the film, the musical tells the story of a talented but volatile actor whose reputation for being difficult forces him to adopt a new identity as a woman in order to land a job. The original movie revolved around a daytime soap opera, while the show involves a Broadway musical.

== Productions ==
The musical had an industry reading in June 2017. Santino Fontana played the lead role of actor Michael Dorsey, who transforms into "Dorothy Michaels" to obtain a role. Scott Ellis replaced Casey Nicholaw as director.

The stage musical version of Tootsie premiered in previews at the Cadillac Palace Theatre in Chicago, beginning September 11, 2018, with an opening at the Palace on September 30, and a run to October 14, 2018. The musical has music and lyrics by David Yazbek with the book by Robert Horn, choreography by Denis Jones, scenic design by David Rockwell, costumes by William Ivey Long, lighting by Donald Holder and direction by Scott Ellis.

Santino Fontana starred as Michael Dorsey, with Lilli Cooper as Julie Nichols, Sarah Stiles as Sandy Lester, John Behlmann as Max Van Horn, Andy Grotelueschen as Jeff Slater, Julie Halston as Rita Marshall, Michael McGrath as Stan Fields and Reg Rogers as Ron Carlisle.

The Broadway production began previews on March 29, 2019, at the Marquis Theatre and opened on April 23, 2019. The production closed on January 5, 2020, having played 293 regular and 25 preview performances.

On May 16, 2019, it was announced that a Non-Equity US national tour would begin in 2020 at Shea's Performing Arts Center in Buffalo, New York. It was also announced that a West End production would open the following year. Finally, additional productions were announced for New Zealand, Singapore, Thailand, Hong Kong, Taiwan, and Japan. Exact dates and casts for these productions will be announced in the future.

A Spanish-language production officially opened on October 22, 2025 at the Teatre Apolo in Barcelona, Spain.

== Characters ==
- Michael Dorsey/Dorothy Michaels – a struggling actor
- Julie Nichols – an actress currently starring as Juliet in Juliet's Nurse
- Sandy Lester – an out-of-work actress and friend of Michael and Jeff
- Jeff Slater – Michael's roommate, an unsuccessful playwright
- Max Van Horn – a reality star currently starring as Craig, Romeo's brother, in Juliet's Nurse
- Rita Marshall – the producer of Juliet's Nurse
- Ron Carlisle – the director and choreographer of Juliet's Nurse
- Stan Fields – Michael's agent
- Suzie and Stuart – the book writers for Juliet's Nurse
- Carl – the stage manager for Juliet's Nurse

== Synopsis ==
=== Act One ===
Michael Dorsey, a struggling actor, is fired after causing a scene during rehearsals in a show directed by Ron Carlisle. Due to his demeanor, he is unable to get any other parts ("Opening Number"). While closing up the steakhouse they work at, Michael complains to his roommate, Jeff Slater, that nobody wants to hire him. Since it's Michael's 40th birthday, Jeff decides to read him the bucket list he made when he was 19, reading off everything Michael swore to accomplish in 20 years. Michael, angered by this, thinks about how little he's accomplished ("Whaddya Do"). Sandy Lester, Michael's neurotic ex-girlfriend, arrives at their apartment for his birthday and immediately starts bickering about how terrible her life is. Michael, expecting a party, arrives and is surprised by Sandy and Jeff. After thanking them, Sandy gets Michael to help her with her audition for the musical Juliet's Curse. She panics about all the things she knows will happen at her audition ("What's Gonna Happen").

Michael goes to his agent, Stan Fields, that afternoon and demands to know why he didn't get called back. They argue and Stan tells him that he is incredibly hard to work and get along with and that he will never work again. Michael storms out, desperate for a job. But while looking through Sandy's script, he gets an idea ("Whaddya Do Reprise 1"). At the auditions, women are auditioning for the role of the Nurse but are all getting turned down. When it's finally Sandy's turn she refuses to stop singing the moment she gets turned down but eventually gives up and leaves. Dorothy Michaels, Michael's made up female alter ego, enters and humbles the producer Rita Marshall. She sings the audition song and is hired by Ron and Rita ("I Won't Let You Down"). Dorothy meets Jeff at the steakhouse and reveals himself to be Michael, to Jeff's dismay. Jeff tells him that what he is doing is stupid and incredibly harmful to any kind of woman and asks what he will tell Sandy, since he took her role. Michael says they won't tell her and talks about his plans with Dorothy. The next day at rehearsals, Dorothy witnesses the mess of a show that is Juliet's Curse. She meets the dimwit reality star winner of Race to Bachelor Island, Max Van Horn, who was cast as Romeo's brother named Craig. She also meets the actress starring as Juliet, Julie Nichols. They perform the song of Juliet celebrating her survival, choreographed by Ron Carlisle ("I'm Alive").

After the show, Julie and Dorothy have lunch together. Julie tells Dorothy about her dreams and about how she chose them over a relationship, and she'd do it again ("There Was John"). Dorothy and Julie agree on a way to make the show better. After a few days at rehearsal, Dorothy improvises getting Craig to fall in love with the Nurse instead of Juliet. Ron is infuriated with this, but everyone in the team sides with Dorothy, including Rita. She lets Dorothy lead the show. Everyone is extremely happy with the changes and having Dorothy as their new leader. Rita changes the show's name to Juliet's Nurse ("I Like What She's Doing"). After the show, Dorothy and Julie head back to Julie's apartment. While Julie talks about herself and Dorothy listens, Michael is realizing that he is in love with her ("Who Are You").

Michael heads back home to tell Jeff about his day with Julie, which is interrupted by Sandy at the door. She asks Michael where he's been and tells him she's been devastated about not getting the part. After a small tangent of how horrible her life is, Michael promises to have dinner with her to make it up to her. She agrees to it, but panics knowing that something will go wrong and Michael will probably stand her up ("What's Gonna Happen Reprise"). She leaves. Jeff tells Michael that what Michael's doing is ridiculous, and he won't be able to get away with it without hurting people, which he is already doing. Michael is too blind to understand this; he disagrees and says Dorothy will be successful and around forever ("Unstoppable"). Still daydreaming about his success, he runs into Julie as Dorothy who thanks her. Dorothy kisses her on impulse and scares Julie off.

=== Act Two ===
Back at his apartment, Jeff sums up and mocks Michael's recent mishaps ("Jeff Sums It Up"). Michael gets a call telling him that the cast is going to see Julie sing at a bar, so he decides to go and meet Julie there himself. Julie sings a song about her feelings towards Dorothy ("Gone, Gone, Gone"). After the song, Michael catches Ron's attention and discovers that he's taking all the credit for Dorothy. Even more motivated to talk to Julie now, he goes up to her and tries to flirt, which results in her throwing wine in his face. They go back home and Jeff makes fun of him, when they're interrupted again by Sandy. She yells at Michael for standing her up, but before leaving, she informs them about Dorothy getting the role and how annoying she is. Michael tells her that she shouldn't be envious of another woman's success; Sandy says no and leaves.

Michael decides he will go over to Julie's as Dorothy and have Dorothy be honest with her. At Julie's apartment, Ron is trying to get Julie to date him while Julie rejects him every time. Dorothy comes, and Julie lets her in. Ron blames Julie disliking him on Dorothy, to which she defends herself and Julie. After getting Ron to leave, Julie tells Dorothy that she thinks she has feelings for Dorothy and wants to pursue them. Dorothy quickly rejects her, upsetting Julie, who thought they had started something special ("Who Are You Reprise"). Michael heads back home. While undressing himself, he hears Max singing for Dorothy outside. After he is yelled at by a neighbor twice, he decides to let him in. He goes and proclaims his love to Dorothy through a ballad and an infected tattoo of her face on his chest ("This Thing"). Right after he finishes, Jeff walks in on them and calls Dorothy a trollop. Max attempts to fight him but is told to leave by Dorothy.

After getting him to leave, Michael finally sheds himself of Dorothy and tells Jeff about his day. After proclaiming that this couldn't get any worse, Stan comes in. He tells Michael that he has booked a role in a play. Michael tells him he is unable to take it because he's doing Jeff's play. Stan tells him that it's the worst decision he's ever made in his life and leaves. Michael decides he wants to try and fix things with Julie again ("Whaddya Do Reprise"). But while half dressed as Dorothy, Stan comes back and walks in on them. At first he greets Dorothy as if nothing was wrong, then returns in agony. Stan tells him he'll be scorned nationwide and he fires him again. It's the next day and the cast and crew are celebrating opening night ("The Most Important Night"). Before the show in Dorothy's dressing room, Rita congratulates and thanks Dorothy for her impact on the show, extending her contract another year as an opening night gift. Dorothy tells her to pay Julie the same as Max and she will take it. After Rita leaves, Max enters. Max thanks Dorothy for believing in him when he had always felt different from everyone else. Max then declares that he will thrust into her opening. Dorothy tells him that he doesn't need her help and to trust in himself. After Max leaves, Julie walks in to leave a note and tells Dorothy that she has never been anything but honest to her. Julie then and tells Dorothy that she means a lot to her and loves her, but they probably shouldn't see each other anymore. Michael self reflects, begging his alter ego to show him what to do next ("Talk To Me Dorothy").

Dorothy and the cast are now performing the finale for Juliet's Nurse ("Arrivederci!"). Dorothy interrupts the song as Nurse, and begins improvising, with Max joining her as Craig halfway. Julie, out of character, stops her and asks what she's doing. Dorothy has no choice but to reveal herself as Michael Dorsey, a desperate actor who just wanted to work. Everyone on stage, including Rita and Ron, are shocked. Julie, hurt, is at a loss of words and runs off. Max, also hurt, asks Michael if Jeff knows. The reveal sparks debate over Michael's charade being exploitation or advocation.

Sandy returns to their apartment in a frenzy. She and Jeff fight over Michael's influence on her and Jeff's writing stagnation until Jeff hits on her, and they realize they are attracted to each other. Just as they are about to kiss, Sandy panics about how what they're doing is a bad idea but is cut off by Jeff kissing her ("What's Gonna Happen Reprise 2"). They run off into the bedroom. Michael comes home the morning after, and in between his regret, realizes how creating Dorothy widened his empathy towards the women in his life. He apologizes to an emerging Sandy for obstructing her chances with the show. Sandy admits that idealizing Michael was hindering her self-confidence and potential future alongside Jeff, who hands Michael a play penned from the experience. Michael wonders if Julie will ever speak to him again ("Michael's Reprise"). Later, Michael meets Julie at the park, awkwardly apologizing. Julie at first retorts his damage was to everyone in the production as well as her, and when she relays the vast disappointment and bias that women experience, Michael vows to listen to anything she needs conveying. She gently concedes that Michael truly staked his pride to perform, but she misses Dorothy. Michael offers a better, forthcoming connection from what they shared before, however closely; Julie allows it. They silently move back to a bench to determine this, between their chastening and hope ("Thank You").

== Musical numbers ==
Source: Playbill

Act I

- Overture – Orchestra
- "Opening Number" – Ensemble, Michael
- "Whaddya Do" – Michael
- "What's Gonna Happen" – Sandy
- "Whaddya Do" (Reprise) – Michael
- "I Won't Let You Down" – Dorothy
- "I'm Alive" – Julie, Ron, Max, Dorothy, Ensemble
- "There Was John" – Julie, Dorothy
- "I Like What She's Doing" – Rita, Julie, Stuart, Suzie, Ron, Max, Dorothy, Ensemble
- "Who Are You?" – Michael, Julie
- "What's Gonna Happen" (Reprise) – Sandy
- "Unstoppable" – Michael/Dorothy

Act II

- Entr'acte – Orchestra
- "Jeff Sums It Up" – Jeff, Michael
- "Gone, Gone, Gone" – Julie, Female Trio
- "Who Are You?" (Reprise) – Julie
- "This Thing" – Max
- "Whaddya Do" (Reprise) – Jeff, Michael
- "The Most Important Night" – Max, Suzie, Stuart, Rita, Ron, Carl, Ensemble
- "Talk to Me Dorothy" – Michael
- "Arrivederci!" – Dorothy, Julie, Max, Ensemble
- "What's Gonna Happen" (Reprise) – Sandy
- "Thank You" – Michael

== Original casts ==
Character	Chicago	Broadway	US tour
Character	2018	2019	2021
Michael Dorsey	Santino Fontana	Santino Fontana	Drew Becker
Julie Nichols	Lilli Cooper	Lilli Cooper	Ashley Alexandra
Jeff Slater	Andy Grotelueschen	Andy Grotelueschen	Jared David Michael Grant
Sandy Lester	Sarah Stiles	Sarah Stiles	Payton Reilly
Max Van Horn	John Behlmann	John Behlmann	Lukas James Miller
Ron Carlisle	Reg Rogers	Reg Rogers	Adam du Plessis
Rita Marshall	Julie Halston	Julie Halston	Kathy Halenda
Stan Fields	Michael McGrath	Michael McGrath	Steve Brustien

== Reception ==
Critic Chris Jones praised the musical in its Chicago premiere for getting many things right, while giving notes for the future Broadway production. In particular, he praised the talent of its lead Santino Fontana. While Michael Phillips commented on the difficulty of translating the early 1980s movie to stage—especially in an era of more gender fluidity—Phillips noted the reviews have ranged "from so-so to very good", while also observing the "opening night laughs were plentiful and the performances savvy".

The show received significant criticism from the transgender and non-binary communities. Christian Lewis of American Theatre wrote, "Although there are no trans characters in the musical, trans people are the butt of every joke, a silent specter of mockery, as the whole musical revolves around a never-ending 'man in a dress' gag, a trope that's rooted in transmisogyny (hatred of trans women)".

== Awards and nominations ==
=== Original Broadway production ===
Year	Award	Category	Nominee	Result
2019	Tony Awards	Best Musical		Nominated
2019	Tony Awards	Best Book of a Musical	Robert Horn	Won
2019	Tony Awards	Best Original Score (Music and/or Lyrics) Written for the Theatre	David Yazbek	Nominated
2019	Tony Awards	Best Direction of a Musical	Scott Ellis	Nominated
2019	Tony Awards	Best Performance by a Leading Actor in a Musical	Santino Fontana	Won
2019	Tony Awards	Best Performance by a Featured Actor in a Musical	Andy Grotelueschen	Nominated
2019	Tony Awards	Best Performance by a Featured Actress in a Musical	Lilli Cooper	Nominated
2019	Tony Awards	Best Performance by a Featured Actress in a Musical	Sarah Stiles	Nominated
2019	Tony Awards	Best Costume Design of a Musical	William Ivey Long	Nominated
2019	Tony Awards	Best Choreography	Denis Jones	Nominated
2019	Tony Awards	Best Orchestrations	Simon Hale	Nominated
2019	Outer Critics Circle Awards	Outstanding New Broadway Musical		Nominated
2019	Outer Critics Circle Awards	Outstanding Book of a Musical (Broadway or Off-Broadway)	Robert Horn	Won
2019	Outer Critics Circle Awards	Outstanding New Score (Broadway or Off-Broadway)	David Yazbek	Nominated
2019	Outer Critics Circle Awards	Outstanding Director of a Musical	Scott Ellis	Nominated
2019	Outer Critics Circle Awards	Outstanding Choreographer	Denis Jones	Nominated
2019	Outer Critics Circle Awards	Outstanding Costume Design (Play or Musical)	William Ivey Long	Nominated
2019	Outer Critics Circle Awards	Outstanding Actor in a Musical	Santino Fontana	Won
2019	Outer Critics Circle Awards	Outstanding Featured Actor in a Musical	John Behlmann	Nominated
2019	Outer Critics Circle Awards	Outstanding Featured Actor in a Musical	Reg Rogers	Nominated
2019	Outer Critics Circle Awards	Outstanding Featured Actress in a Musical	Sarah Stiles	Nominated
2019	New York Drama Critics' Circle Awards	Best Musical		Won
2019	Drama Desk Awards	Outstanding Musical		Nominated
2019	Drama Desk Awards	Outstanding Actor in a Musical	Santino Fontana	Won
2019	Drama Desk Awards	Outstanding Featured Actress in a Musical	Sarah Stiles	Nominated
2019	Drama Desk Awards	Outstanding Director of a Musical	Scott Ellis	Nominated
2019	Drama Desk Awards	Outstanding Choreography	Denis Jones	Nominated
2019	Drama Desk Awards	Outstanding Music	David Yazbek	Won
2019	Drama Desk Awards	Outstanding Lyrics	David Yazbek	Won
2019	Drama Desk Awards	Outstanding Book of a Musical	Robert Horn	Won
2019	Drama Desk Awards	Outstanding Costume Design for a Musical	William Ivey Long	Nominated
2019	Drama Desk Awards	Outstanding Sound Design in a Musical	Brian Ronan	Nominated
2019	Drama Desk Awards	Outstanding Wig and Hair Design	Paul Huntley	Nominated
2019	Drama League Awards	Outstanding Production of a Broadway or Off-Broadway Musical		Nominated
2019	Drama League Awards	Distinguished Performance Award	Santino Fontana	Nominated
