= Toni Brattin =

American television host and wig designer

- Born: 1960 (age 65–66); Oklahoma City, Oklahoma, U.S.
- Occupation: Entrepreneur • designer • host
- Years active: 1996–present
- Known for: Hairpiece collection Accidental live-TV on-air slip-up
- Television: QVC • HSN
- Spouse: Tom Casso
- Children: 1
- Website: tonibrattin.com

Toni Brattin (born 1960) is an American beauty entrepreneur, wig designer, and TV shopping network personality. She is the founder of Toni Brattin & Co. and is widely known for presenting her popular line of faux hairpieces, wigs, and self-tanners on networks like QVC.

== Early life ==
Brattin was raised in El Reno, Oklahoma. She initially planned to pursue fine arts at St. Gregory's University in Shawnee, Oklahoma, but her studies were interrupted after she got married and had a child. By the age of 19, Brattin had gone through a divorce as a young mother.

She later attended nursing school, but to provide steady support for her young son, she took a job in the accounting department of an oil company in El Reno. While working there, she met Pam Vrana, who worked as the company's receptionist; Vrana later became the long-time office manager for Brattin's enterprise.

== Career ==
=== Business ventures and home shopping ===
Brattin began her beauty business by collaborating with cosmetic laboratories in Dallas, Texas, to develop her own line of beauty products. She honed her marketing skills by presenting and expanding her brand at trade shows across and beyond Oklahoma for several years.

In 1996, a product scout discovered Brattin's new self-tanning product in a trade publication. This led to an invitation from a representative in Philadelphia to create a two-minute commercial, which subsequently opened an opportunity with the Home Shopping Network (HSN).

Given a seven-minute live broadcast segment on HSN to sell 2,500 inventory units, Brattin sold out her entire stock in just five minutes, leading producers to cut her segment short. The successful appearance launched her products into major national retailers and established her international brand presence. She later expanded her product line into synthetic wigs and hairpieces.

=== QVC ===
Brattin has worked in television for more than 30 years and is known for her appearances on QVC, where she promotes her wigs and hair products.

In August 2026, Brattin went viral after an accidental verbal slip during a live QVC segment while presenting her Salon Select Wig. She attempted to describe the wig's style but unintentionally used a sexual term before correcting herself. The incident went viral on social media, with the clip reportedly receiving millions of views.

Brattin later discussed the incident in an interview with TMZ, describing herself as being on "autopilot" while presenting the product and saying that QVC had been supportive following the incident.

The incident was then discussed on The Tonight Show Starring Jimmy Fallon. Brattin appeared on the August 10 episode, where she discussed the viral moment with Jimmy Fallon and gave him one of her wigs. Fallon also demonstrated the wig during the segment.
