= Charles LaPointe =

American hair and wig designer (born 20th century)

Charles G. LaPointe
- Citizenship: USA
- Occupations: Hair and wig designer
- Years active: 2003–present
- Known for: Hair and wig design for Broadway and television
- Notable work: Hamilton; MJ the Musical; Beetlejuice; The Cher Show; SpongeBob SquarePants; Jersey Boys; In the Heights

Charles G. LaPointe is an American hair and wig designer for the theatre and television. He has designed for numerous Broadway, touring, regional, West End, and international productions.

His Broadway credits include: Death Becomes Her; Suffs, Hamilton, MJ the Musical, Beetlejuice, The Cher Show, SpongeBob Squarepants; Jersey Boys, and In the Heights, among others.

== Life ==
LaPointe grew up in Massachusetts and upstate New York. He was interested in fashion and design as a child. He began acting at age 17. He attempted a career as a performer in New York City, and went on tour as part of A Chorus Line. He soon chose to move into technical theater, and learned wig design from Tom Watson after the two worked on a show together. LaPointe and Watson went on to share studio space for many years. LaPointe never had formal schooling for wig design.

LaPointe's first work as a hair and wig designer on Broadway was in Wicked, where he worked as an associate hair designer. He worked on the 2004 Broadway revival of A Raisin in the Sun the following year, which he considered his breakthrough job.

== Work ==
=== Theater ===
- A Raisin in the Sun (2004)
- Jersey Boys
- In the Heights
- Hamilton
- Beetlejuice
- The Band's Visit
- SpongeBob Squarepants
- The Cher Show (2019)
- MJ the Musical
- Suffs
- Doubt (2024)
- The Who's Tommy (2024)
- Death Becomes Her (2024)

=== Television ===
- The Wiz Live! (2015)
- Jesus Christ Superstar Live in Concert (2018)

== Personal life ==
LaPointe is gay.

== Awards and nominations ==
Year	Award	Category	Show	Result	Ref
2016	Drama Desk Award	Outstanding Wig and Hair Design	The School for Scandal	Nominated	
2016	Emmy Awards		The Wiz Live!	Nominated	
	Emmy Awards		Jesus Christ Superstar Live in Concert	Nominated	
	Make-Up Artists /Hair Stylist Guild Award		Jesus Christ Superstar Live in Concert		
	Make-Up Artists /Hair Stylist Guild Award		Hamilton		
2018	Drama Desk Award	Outstanding Wig and Hair Design	SpongeBob Squarepants	Won	
2019	Drama Desk Award	Outstanding Wig and Hair Design	The Cher Show	Won	
2019	Drama Desk Award	Outstanding Wig and Hair Design	Beetlejuice	Nominated	
2022	Drama Desk Award	Outstanding Wig and Hair Design	MJ the Musical	Nominated	
2024	Drama Desk Award	Outstanding Wig and Hair Design	Suffs	Nominated	
