= High Society (1995 TV series) =

- Genre: Sitcom
- Created by: Robert Horn; Daniel Margosis
- Written by: Lisa Albert; Pat Dougherty; Marc Flanagan; Robert Horn; Daniel Margosis
- Directed by: Stan Daniels; Iris Dugow; Ellen Gittelsohn; Michael Lembeck
- Starring: Jean Smart; Mary McDonnell
- Theme music composer: Howard McCrary; Mark Stevens
- Opening theme: "The Lady Is a Tramp" performed by Chaka Khan
- Composers: Frank Fitzpatrick; David Tobocman
- Country of origin: United States
- Original language: English
- No. of seasons: 1
- No. of episodes: 13

Production
- Executive producers: Gary Dontzig; Marc Flanagan; Robert Horn; Daniel Margosis; Steven Peterman
- Producers: Lisa Albert; Barbara Dorio
- Running time: 22–24 minutes
- Production companies: JVTV; Look Ma Productions; Warner Bros. Television

Original release
- Network: CBS
- Release: October 30, 1995 – February 26, 1996

High Society is an American sitcom television series starring Jean Smart and Mary McDonnell that aired Monday nights on CBS from October 30, 1995, to February 26, 1996. It was added to the CBS schedule as a replacement for If Not for You, a sitcom that was cancelled after a few episodes. The theme song was "The Lady Is a Tramp" sung by Chaka Khan.

Its premise was similar to the campy British comedy series Absolutely Fabulous.

== Storyline ==
The series revolves around two New York City women who acted in an outrageous, campy, and decadent manner. Ellie Walker (Jean Smart) is a successful author of trashy romantic novels, and her best friend and publisher is Dorothy "Dott" Emerson (Mary McDonnell). Emerson is a divorced mother with a preppie college-aged son, Brendan Emerson (Dan O'Donahue), a College Republican, who resists Ellie's relentless sexual advances. At the publishing house, the women worked with a flamboyant gay male secretary named Stephano (Luigi Amodeo) and a sleazy publisher partner named Peter Thomas (David Rasche).

In the pilot episode, the women's small-town former college friend, Val Brumberg (Faith Prince), arrives after she decides to leave her philandering husband, Mitchell, one of Ellie's many exes. Val moves in with Dott, much to the chagrin of Elle, who stops speaking to Dott because of this. Val later reveals the other reason she came to Dott is because she is pregnant and needs someone to help her through her pregnancy. Aside from the situational comedy that arose from Ellie and Dott's campy antics, the storylines often centered on the notion of family. Val started to become something of a mother figure to Brendan. However, she was written out of the series without explanation after the sixth episode. The series then centered more on the campy lifestyle and antics of Ellie and Dott.

== Cancellation ==
Despite garnering decent ratings, the series was canceled after 13 episodes and replaced with Good Company.

== Cast ==
=== Main ===
- Jean Smart as Ellie Walker
- Mary McDonnell as Dorothy "Dott" Emerson
- Dan O'Donahue as Brendan Emerson
- David Rasche as Peter Thomas
- Faith Prince as Valerie "Val" Brumberg (episodes 1–6)
- Luigi Amodeo as Stephano

=== Recurring ===
- Jayne Meadows as Alice Morgan-DuPont-Sutton-Cushing-Ferruke

=== Guest stars ===
- Barry Bostwick as Michael
- Bronson Pinchot as Fred
- Doris Roberts as Maggie
- Paul Dooley as Harry
- Tom Arnold as Tony

== Episodes ==
No.	Title	Directed by	Written by	Original release date	Prod. code	U.S. viewers (millions)
1	"Family Val's"	Michael Lembeck	Robert Horn & Daniel Margosis	October 30, 1995	465051	15.4
Dott invites Val to stay with her, much to Ellie's chagrin.
2	"Whose Son Is It Anyway?"	Iris Dugow	Robert Horn & Daniel Margosis	November 6, 1995	465053	14.1
Dott fears Val has developed a maternal bond with Brendan. Meanwhile, Ellie and Stephano each throw themselves at Ellie's buff new bodyguard.
3	"Sleeping with the Enemy"	Stan Daniels	Robert Horn & Daniel Margosis	November 13, 1995	465052	15.7
In an attempt to get rid of Val, Ellie tries to reunite her with estranged husband Mitchell, but soon comes to realize that Val might be better off without him.
4	"Dolce & G'bye Now"	Iris Dugow	Robert Horn & Daniel Margosis	November 20, 1995	465055	13.0
After being humiliated by Ellie, Stephano quits and Dott reluctantly hires Val as his replacement, which sends Ellie into a frenzied fit.
5	"Tomb with a View"	Iris Dugow	Lisa Albert	November 27, 1995	465056	14.7
When Alice's neighbor dies, Ellie tries to impress the snooty building committee in order to secure a lush apartment.
6	"The Naked and the Deadline"	Iris Dugow	Marc Flanagan	December 4, 1995	465054	11.7
When Ellie develops writer's block, Dott goes to great lengths to get her unstuck.
7	"Finnigan's Rainbow"	Iris Dugow	Robert Horn & Daniel Margosis	December 11, 1995	465057	12.5
Dott falls in love with a motivational speaker (Barry Bostwick).
8	"We Ought to be in Pictures"	Iris Dugow	Robert Horn & Daniel Margosis	December 18, 1995	465058	10.7
When production begins on a film based on one of her novels, Ellie is horrified to discover she has forfeited all creative control.
9	"Nip and Tuck"	Iris Dugow	Lisa Albert & Marc Flanagan	January 15, 1996	465059	13.7
Alice convinces Dott and Ellie to see a plastic surgeon (Bronson Pinchot) before an upcoming photo shoot.
10	"Alice Doesn't Pump Here Anymore"	Iris Dugow	Robert Horn & Daniel Margosis	January 22, 1996	465060	14.3
After sustaining a heart attack, Alice finds herself being smothered by Dott.
11	"Touching Up Your Roots"	Iris Dugow	Pat Dougherty	February 5, 1996	465061	12.6
Ellie's parents (Doris Roberts, Paul Dooley) visit with a shocking confession.
12	"I Found My Thrill on Nancy Garver Hill"	Ellen Gittelsohn	Lisa Albert & Marc Flanagan	February 12, 1996	465062	12.5
Ellie discovers a rival romance novelist is actually the guy she has been sleeping with (Tom Arnold).
13	"The Family Jewels"	Iris Dugow	Robert Horn & Daniel Margosis	February 26, 1996	465063	17.3
Ellie decides she wants to have a baby.

== Award nominations ==
Year	Award	Category	Recipient	Result
1996	Emmy Award	Outstanding Supporting Actress in a Comedy Series	Jayne Meadows	Nominated
1996	Casting Society of America	Best Casting for TV, Comedy Pilot	Leslie Litt	Nominated
