= Drama Desk Award for Outstanding Wig and Hair Design =

Annual award

- Awarded for: Outstanding Wig and Hair Design
- Location: New York City
- Country: United States
- Presented by: Drama Desk
- First award: 2016
- Currently held by: Nikiya Mathis, Cats: The Jellicle Ball (2026)
- Website: dramadesk.org (defunct)

The Drama Desk Award for Outstanding Wig and Hair Design is an annual award presented by Drama Desk in recognition of achievements in theatre across collective Broadway, off-Broadway and off-off-Broadway productions in New York City. Unlike some Drama Desk Awards, the award for Outstanding Wig and Hair Design combines plays and musicals into a single category.

Mia M. Neal, David Brian Brown and Charles G. LaPointe hold the record for two wins each, while Lapointe is tied with Nikiya Mathis and Campbell Young Associates for the most nominations, with five nominations each.

== Winners and nominees ==
Key

and bold indicates the winner.

=== 2010s ===
Year	Designer	Production	Ref.
2016
2016	**Mia M. Neal**	**Shuffle Along**	
2016	David Brian Brown	She Loves Me	
2016	Jason Hayes	The Legend of Georgia McBride	
2016	Robert-Charles Vallance	Women Without Men	
2016	Charles G. LaPointe	The School for Scandal	
2017
2017	**David Brian Brown**	**War Paint**	
2017	Campbell Young Associates	Hello, Dolly!	
2017	John Jared Janas	Yours Unfaithfully	
2017	Jason Hayes	The View UpStairs	
2017	Josh Marquette	Present Laughter	
2017	Tom Watson	The Little Foxes	
2018
2018	**Charles G. LaPointe**	**SpongeBob SquarePants**	
2018	Carole Hancock	Harry Potter and the Cursed Child	
2018	Campbell Young Associates	Farinelli and the King	
2018	Cookie Jordan	School Girls; or, The African Mean Girls Play	
2018	Josh Marquette	Mean Girls	
2019
2019	**Charles G. LaPointe**	**The Cher Show**	
2019	Campbell Young Associates	Gary: A Sequel to Titus Andronicus	
2019	Cookie Jordan	Eddie and Dave	
2019	Paul Huntley	Tootsie	
2019	Charles G. LaPointe	Beetlejuice	

=== 2020s ===
Year	Designer	Production
2020
2020	**Campbell Young Associates**	**Tina: The Tina Turner Musical**
2020	Cookie Jordan	Fefu and Her Friends
2020	Nikiya Mathis	STEW
2020	Tom Watson	The Great Society
2020	Bobbie Zlotnik	Emojiland
2021	No awards: New York theatres shuttered, March 2020 to September 2021, due to the COVID-19 pandemic in New York City	
2022
2022	**David Brian Brown**	**Mrs. Doubtfire**
2022	Matthew B. Armentrout	Paradise Square
2022	Paul Huntley	Diana
2022	Charles G. LaPointe	MJ the Musical
2023
2023	**Mia M. Neal**	**Ain't No Mo'**
2023	Campbell Young Associates	Almost Famous
2023	Cookie Jordan	August Wilson's The Piano Lesson
2023	Earon Nealey	Twelfth Night
2023	Mitsuteru Okuyama	Chushingura 47 Ronin
2023	Luc Verschueren	A Beautiful Noise, the Neil Diamond Musical
2024
2024	**Nikiya Mathis**	**Jaja's African Hair Braiding**
2024	J. Jared Janas & Cassie Williams	Sally & Tom
2024	Charles LaPointe	Suffs
2024	Nikiya Mathis	The Harriet Holland Social Club presents The 84th Annual Star-Burst Cotillion in the Grand Ballroom of the Renaissance Hotel
2024	Robert Pickens & Katie Gell	Stereophonic
2025
2025	Charles LaPointe	Death Becomes Her
2025	Alberto "Albee" Alvarado	SUMO
2025	Sabana Majeed	Boop! The Musical
2025	Nikiya Mathis	Cats: The Jellicle Ball
2025	Nikiya Mathis	Liberation
2026
2026	**Nikiya Mathis**	**Cats: The Jellicle Ball**
2026	David Brian Brown	The Lost Boys
2026	David Brian Brown and Victoria Tinsman	Fallen Angels
2026	Alberto “Albee” Alvarado	The Rocky Horror Show
2026	Robert Pickens	Tartuffe

== Multiple wins ==
2 wins

- Mia M. Neal
- David Brian Brown
- Charles G. LaPointe

== Multiple nominations ==
5 nominations

- Charles G. LaPointe
- Campbell Young Associates
- Nikiya Mathis

4 nominations

- Cookie Jordan

3 nominations

- David Brian Brown
- Nikiya Mathis

2 nominations

- Mia M. Neal
- Jason Hayes
- Josh Marquette
- Tom Watson
- Paul Huntley
- John Jared Janas
- David Brian Brown
