= Robert Horn (writer) =

American writer and producer

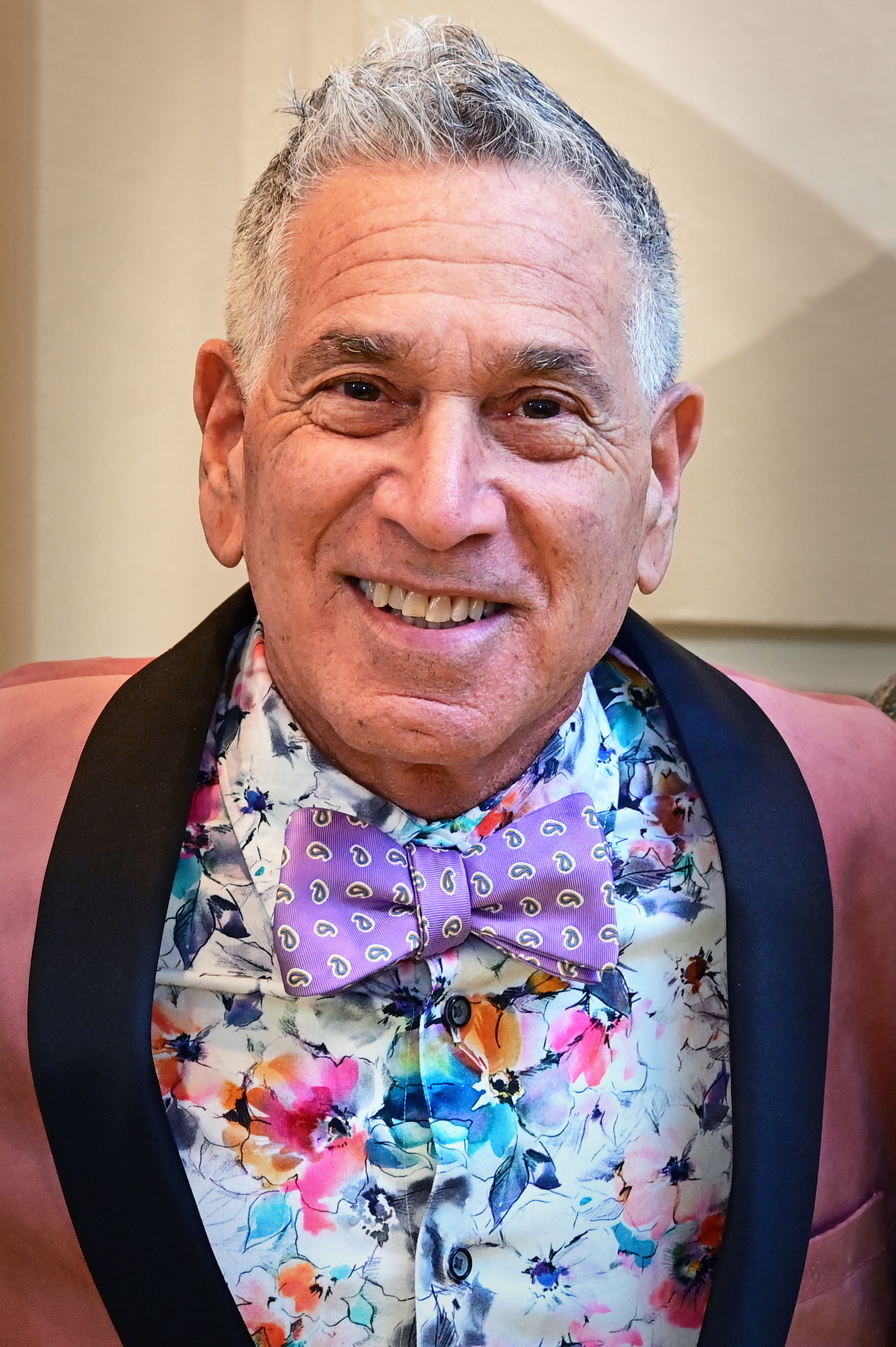
- Horn in 2026
- Born: New York City, U.S.
- Occupations: Playwright; screenwriter; producer
- Years active: 2002–present

Robert Horn is an American playwright, screenwriter and producer. He is best known on the stage for his Tony Award-winning book for the Broadway musical adaptation of Tootsie, as well as 13, Disney Theatrical's Hercules, and the Broadway musical Shucked. For film and television, he is best known as the screenwriter for Netflix's 13: the Musical and the Disney Channel Original Movies Teen Beach Movie, Teen Beach 2, Sharpay's Fabulous Adventure, and The Suite Life Movie.

== Life and career ==
Horn, a New York native, had "a grim, grinding, achingly humorless childhood only Charles Dickens could do justice to," according to writer Harry Haun. His single mother gave up his twin sister and older brother to foster homes; his brother died of pancreatic cancer in prison in 2019, and his sister died of the same illness months later. “I think, because I had the upbringing I had, I was fearless," Horn told Haun in a 2023 article.

Horn studied theater at New York University Tisch School of the Arts and New York's Circle in the Square Theatre School. Soon after, he moved to Los Angeles to pursue a writing career in film and television. His first major job was as a writer/producer on the television series Designing Women, followed by the Fox series Living Single and the CBS comedy High Society.

After moving to Los Angeles, Horn was signed to an overall production deal with Warner Brothers Studios, where he developed, wrote, and executive produced dozens of network pilots and series. He then signed a script deal at Sony Studios, followed by an overall pilot deal at ABC studios. Along with Bob Boyett, Horn created and wrote the FX series Partners.

Horn wrote pilots for Car Wash (developed with Will Packer), Jenni starring Jenni Rivera, Sunnyland starring Jennifer Hudson, Left of Center (developed with Gail Berman), Taxi 22 starring James Gandolfini, and 13: the Musical on Netflix.

For Disney Channel, Horn wrote The Suite Life Movie as well as TV musicals Sharpay’s Fabulous Adventure and the record-breaking Teen Beach Movie and Teen Beach 2, the former pulling in the third highest viewership ever for the channel, on the heels of High School Musical 2 and Wizards of Waverly Place: The Movie. Horn also wrote Wild Life for Walt Disney Feature Animations and Good Advice featuring Charlie Sheen.

Special projects include The RuPaul Christmas Special on BBC, Bette Midler's Divine Intervention Tour, and a digital musical series co-written with Jason Robert Brown for Sony's digital Crackle network.

Horn's writing for the theater stage includes Dame Edna, Back with a Vengeance, 13, Disney's Hercules, the Broadway musical Shucked, and the musical version of Tootsie. Horn's work on Tootsie received widespread acclaim upon the musical's pre-Broadway premiere in Chicago – Vanity Fair says "the humor of Tootsie arises from writer Robert Horn’s bull’s-eye deployment of zingers – and the cast’s infallible delivery of them." The Chicago Tribune says that "Tootsie is a very funny show, mostly due to Horn’s book." Horn won a Tony Award for the musical's book. For Shucked, Horn received Tony, Drama Desk, and Outer Critics Circle nominations for Best Book.

== Stage credits ==
Year	Title	Role	Venue	Ref.
2004	Dame Edna: Back with a Vengeance	Additional material	Broadway, Music Box Theatre	
2004	Lone Star Love	Bookwriter	Off-Broadway, Amas Musical Theatre	
2007	Lone Star Love	Bookwriter	Regional, 5th Avenue Theatre	
2007	13	Bookwriter	Regional, Mark Taper Forum	
2008	13	Bookwriter	Regional, Goodspeed Musicals	
2008	13	Bookwriter	Broadway, Bernard B. Jacobs Theatre	
2015	Moonshine: The Hee-Haw Musical	Bookwriter	Regional, Dallas Theater Center	
2018	Tootsie	Bookwriter	Regional, Cadillac Palace Theatre	
2019	Tootsie	Bookwriter	Broadway, Marquis Theatre	
2023	Shucked	Bookwriter	Broadway, Nederlander Theatre	
2023	Hercules	Revised Book	Regional, Paper Mill Playhouse	
2024	Hercules	Revised Book	Germany, Stage Entertainment	
2025	Hercules	Revised Book	West End, Theatre Royal Drury Lane	

== Awards ==
Year	Award	Category	Work	Result
2019	Tony Award	Best Book of a Musical	Tootsie	Won
2019	Drama Desk Award	Outstanding Book of a Musical	Tootsie	Won
2019	Outer Critics Circle Award	Outstanding Book of a Musical (Broadway or Off-Broadway)	Tootsie	Won
2023	Tony Award	Best Book of a Musical	Shucked	Nominated
2023	Drama Desk Award	Outstanding Book of a Musical	Shucked	Nominated
2023	Outer Critics Circle Award	Outstanding Book of a Musical (Broadway or Off-Broadway)	Shucked	Won
