= Death Becomes Her (musical) =

Broadway musical

- Broadway promotional poster
- Music: Julia Mattison; Noel Carey
- Lyrics: Julia Mattison; Noel Carey
- Book: Marco Pennette
- Basis: Death Becomes Her by Martin Donovan; David Koepp
- Premiere: May 19, 2024: Cadillac Palace Theatre, Chicago
- Productions: 2024 Chicago; 2024 Broadway

Death Becomes Her is a musical, with a book by Marco Pennette and music and lyrics by Julia Mattison and Noel Carey. It is based on the 1992 film of the same name directed by Robert Zemeckis. It made its world premiere in May 2024 at the Cadillac Palace Theatre in Chicago, and moved to Broadway's Lunt-Fontanne Theatre in November 2024.

The original Chicago and Broadway productions received critical acclaim by theatre critics, for its score, book, production design, stunts, special effects, and humor with both Megan Hilty and Jennifer Simard receiving universal praise for their comedic timing, chemistry, and performances. It received a leading 10 nominations at the 78th Tony Awards and won for Best Costume Design in a Musical.

== Synopsis ==
=== Act I ===
The show opens with Viola Van Horn and her group of immortals sharing "a secret you would die for" by offering the audience a magic potion that grants eternal beauty and perfection ("If You Want Perfection").

Vain and self-absorbed actress Madeline Ashton performs in the Broadway show Me! Me! Me! ("For the Gaze"). She is visited by her old friend and struggling writer Helen Sharp, whom she frequently belittles and insults for her own amusement. However, Helen has one-upped Madeline by revealing she is engaged to famed plastic surgeon, Ernest Menville, and relishes the opportunity to get back at her frenemy ("That Was Then, This is Now").

Madeline invites the two over to her home, where she seduces Ernest ("Tell Me, Ernest"), steals him from Helen and ends up marrying him ("Madeline Ashton's Intimate Wedding Extravaganza"), with Ernest promising during the wedding to stay "til death do us part" ("Ernest's Real Vows"). Helen has a psychotic break and is forcibly committed to a mental hospital, where she obsesses over killing Madeline ("Madeline").

Ten years later, Madeline and Ernest remain unhappily married. Madeline has begun to age visibly, costing her acting jobs ("(I See) Me!"), while Ernest copes with his regrets by drinking ("Til Death"). The couple are invited to the publication of Helen's debut novel, and upon arrival, Madeline is given Viola Van Horn's business card by a mysterious waiter named Chagall. Helen appears, having become mysteriously young, successful, and beautiful. She further humiliates Madeline by mocking her age and her recent embarrassing film roles, and openly flirts with Ernest ("Tell Me, Ernest (Reprise)").

Madeline has a panic attack in the parking lot and vows not to let her career and image "fall apart" before she visits Viola at her home ("Falling Apart"). Viola offers Madeline the potion on the condition that she vanish from the public eye after ten years to keep its existence a secret. She takes the potion, becoming young and beautiful again. Viola leaves Madeline with a warning: "take care of your body" ("Siempre Viva").

Back at Ernest and Madeline's home, Helen breaks in and rekindles her relationship with Ernest, and the two plan to run away together by murdering Madeline ("Let's Run Away Together"). Upon Madeline's return, she and Helen get into a fight, which results in Madeline falling down the stairs and breaking her neck. As Helen devises a new plan to report the death as an accident, Madeline suddenly reanimates, accusing Helen of pushing her intentionally. As they stare at Madeline, seemingly alive but with a twisted neck, Viola appears onstage and taunts that she has "a secret you would die for" ("Confrontation").

=== Act II ===
Ernest and Helen frantically drive Madeline to the hospital, where it is confirmed that she is clinically dead, yet still alive. The sequence is intercut with Viola appearing on the stage, addressing the audience and admonishing Madeline for ignoring her warning ("Don't Say I Didn't (Warn You)").

Returning home, Madeline realizes Helen has taken the potion as well and shoots her with a shotgun, leaving a massive hole in her torso. Their bickering leads to further violence and more injuries: Helen is impaled by an umbrella, and Madeline is decapitated before Ernest stops them ("Hit Me"). The two women coerce Ernest to use his surgical skills to repair their bodies, and he agrees on the condition that he be allowed to leave afterward. Drunk and delirious, Ernest plans to fix them with glue, clay, and spray paint ("The Plan"). He also fires Stefan, Madeline's long-suffering assistant, to prevent him from discovering their immortality ("Stefan's Turn").

Madeline and Helen realize they'll need Ernest for maintenance and plot to drug him and have him drink the potion so he can become immortal too. After knocking Ernest out, they take him to Viola's, where she is hosting a ball with the other immortals ("Live to Serve"). Ernest awakens, and Viola tempts him with the potion, but he refuses and escapes ("Siempre Viva (Reprise)" / "The Chase"). Madeline and Helen chase Ernest to the roof, and when he declares that he would rather die than have to spend eternity with them, Viola pushes him off to his apparent death ("Til Death (Reprise)").

Helen despondently realizes she's doomed to outlive all of her friends and family and be alone forever. Madeline, finally apologizing for her actions, tells her that they can fix one another and can be each other's "person" ("Alive Forever"). The two drop their rivalry, embrace, and head home.

Fifty years later, while visiting their own gravesites, Madeline and Helen run into an elderly Ernest, who had survived the fall, fell in love with his nurse, married her, and had children and grandchildren ("Fifty Years Later"). As Ernest and his wife leave, Helen and Madeline momentarily lament that they will never have an "ending" of their own before exiting the cemetery together, while Viola suddenly appears once more and taunts the audience to "[not] say [she] didn't warn [them]" ("The End").

== Musical numbers ==
Broadway Run

Act I

- If You Want Perfection — Viola, Immortals
- For the Gaze — Madeline, Ensemble
- That Was Then, This is Now — Helen
- Tell Me, Ernest — Madeline, Helen, Ernest
- Madeline Ashton's Intimate Wedding Extravaganza — Ernest, Madeline, Luciano, Ensemble
- Ernest's Real Vows - Ernest
- Madeline — Helen
- (I See) Me! — Madeline, Ensemble*
- Till Death — Ernest
- Tell Me, Ernest (Reprise) — Helen
- Falling Apart — Madeline
- Siempre Viva — Viola, Immortals
- Let's Run Away Together — Helen, Ernest
- Confrontation — Madeline, Helen, Ernest, Viola

Act II

- Entr'acte
- Don't Say I Didn't (Warn You) — Viola, Immortals
- Hit Me — Helen, Madeline
- The Plan — Ernest, Ensemble
- Stefan's Turn — Stefan
- Live to Serve — Chagall, Immortals
- Siempre Viva (Reprise) — Viola, Madeline, Helen
- The Chase — Immortals
- Till Death (Reprise) — Ernest, Madeline, Helen
- Alive Forever — Helen, Madeline
- Fifty Years Later — Ernest, Madeline, Helen
- The End — Helen, Madeline, Ensemble

Chicago Run

Act I

- Prelude — Viola, Ensemble
- For the Gaze —Madeline, Ensemble
- That Was Then, This is Now — Helen, Ernest
- Tell Me, Ernest — Madeline, Helen, Ernest
- The Vows — Ensemble
- Madeline — Helen
- (I See) Me! — Madeline, Ensemble*
- Till Death — Ernest
- Tell Me, Ernest (Reprise) — Helen, Ernest
- Madeline's Lament — Madeline
- Siempre Viva — Viola, Madeline, Ensemble
- Let's Run Away Together — Helen, Ernest
- Disrespect Me (The Stairs) — Madeline, Helen
- Let's Run Away Together (Reprise) — Helen, Ernest, Madeline, Viola

Act II

- Don't Say I Didn't Warn You — Viola, Ensemble
- Hit Me Like You Mean It — Helen, Madeline, Ernest
- Ernest Menville — Ernest, Ensemble
- Siempre Viva (Reprise) — Viola, Madeline, Helen, Ernest
- Goodbye Forever — Ernest, Helen, Madeline
- That Was Then, This is Now (Reprise I) — Helen, Madeline
- Alive Forever - Helen, Madeline
- Gone (The Procession) — Ensemble
- That Was Then, This is Now (Reprise II) — Ernest
- Finale — Helen, Madeline

* Adapted from the original song by Geoffrey Aymar, David Koepp, and Martin Donovan included in the 1992 film

== Development ==
In December 2017, a Broadway musical adaptation of Death Becomes Her was reported to be in development, with Kristin Chenoweth tapped to star. The book is written by Marco Pennette and has an original score by Julia Mattison and Noel Carey.

Notably, the character of Lisle von Rhuman, originally portrayed by Isabella Rossellini in the film, was changed to Viola Van Horn, portrayed by Michelle Williams. When asked about the decision making behind the change, Williams said she did not know what caused the change, but stated that there were some plot elements in the production that may hint at the reason.

Penette's book included elements of the film that were cut before its premiere, including a scene with Madeline being sent to a morgue and a modified version of the original ending to the film.

== Production history ==
=== Chicago (2024) ===
In September 2023 it was announced that the musical was produced by Broadway In Chicago, Universal Theatrical Group, 321 Theatrical Management, and was directed and choreographed by Christopher Gattelli. The production featured set design by Derek McLane, costume design by Paul Tazewell, lighting design by Justin Townsend, sound design by Peter Hylenski, illusions by Rob Lake, hair and makeup by Charles LaPointe and Joe Dulude II.

The musical ran at the Cadillac Palace Theatre in Chicago from April 30 to June 2, 2024. The cast featured Megan Hilty as Madeline, Jennifer Simard as Helen, Christopher Sieber as Ernest and Michelle Williams as Viola Van Horn, a character originally named Lisle von Rhuman.

=== Broadway (2024-26) ===
In May 2024, the producers announced their plans to have the musical begin performances at Broadway's Lunt-Fontanne Theatre on October 23 of that year, with an official opening scheduled for November 21. Joining the producing team for the Broadway transfer were Marc Platt (in his first stage producing collaboration with Universal since Wicked), Debra Martin Chase, Jason Blum, James Wan and Steven Spielberg alongside his wife Kate Capshaw. Hilty, Simard, Sieber and Williams reprised their roles. On January 16, 2026, Betsy Wolfe joined the cast as Madeline Ashton replacing Megan Hilty.

The show played its final Broadway performance on June 28, 2026, after 27 previews and 666 regular performances.

=== North American tour (2026) ===
A North American tour of the Broadway production launched in the fall of 2026 in Cleveland. The cast for the tour features Jackie Burns as Madeline Ashton, Kristen Beth Williams as Helen Sharp, Ken Marino as Ernest, Nasia Thomas as Viola, Louis A. Williams Jr. as Chagall and Michael Buchanan as Stefan.

== Cast and characters ==
Character	Chicago	Broadway	North American Tour
Character	2024-2026		2026
Madeline Ashton	Megan Hilty	Megan Hilty	Jackie Burns
Helen Sharp	Jennifer Simard	Jennifer Simard	Kristen Beth Williams
Ernest Menville	Christopher Sieber	Christopher Sieber	Ken Marino
Viola Van Horn	Michelle Williams	Michelle Williams	Nasia Thomas
Chagall	Taurean Everett	Taurean Everett	Louis A. Williams Jr.
Stefan	Josh Lamon	Josh Lamon	Michael Buchanan

=== Notable replacements ===
==== Broadway 2026 ====
- Madeline Ashton: Betsy Wolfe

==== North American 2026 Tour ====
In July 2026, Death Becomes Her announced the cast of its North American Tour. Starring Jackie Burns as Madeline Ashton, Kristen Beth Williams as Helen Sharp, and Ken Marino as Ernest Menville, with Nasia Thomas leading the Immortals as the mysterious Viola Van Horn.

== Critical response ==
=== Chicago production ===
The original Chicago production received generally positive reviews, praising the cast performance, especially appreciating Williams, Hilty and Simard. Steven Oxman of Variety wrote that book writer Marco Pennette "makes many smart choices in this adaptation" writing that the narrative has a proper rhythm between singing performances and acting.

=== Broadway production ===
The Broadway production was mostly praised by critics. Benjamin Lee of The Guardian stated that "after a buzzy initial run in Chicago, Death Becomes Her has been reborn on Broadway as a rousing, raucously entertaining hit", emphasizing that the acting performances equal those in the film. Greg Evans of Deadline Hollywood wrote that the musical production "improves in every way over the 1992 film" in which "Mattison and Carey have concocted a knock-'em-dead collection of killer songs that send up show tune convention while celebrating each and every one with love and care". Johnny Oleksinski of New York Post gave the production 3 out of 4 stars, appreciating that "the lyrics are often clever and naughty, but melody is cast aside in favor of vocal acrobatics" with the direction which "finds nifty ways of nodding to that legacy onstage" for an "appropriately over-the-top production". Jesse Green of The New York Times praised Simard's and Hilty's performances, and he also regarded the stage design positively despite feeling that the storyline was disconnected.

In their respective reviews, Evans and Green both lauded the drama and tension between Simard's and Hilty's characters. Evans said the two women "are perfectly paired", while Green said that "the chance to see two theatrical masterminds go at it for a few hours" compensated for what he saw as the shortcomings of the original film.

== Awards and nominations ==
=== Original Broadway production ===
Year	Award	Category	Nominee	Result
2025	Drama Desk Awards	Outstanding Musical	Death Becomes Her	Nominated
2025	Drama Desk Awards	Outstanding Lead Performance in a Musical	Jennifer Simard	Nominated
2025	Drama Desk Awards	Outstanding Book of a Musical	Marco Pennette	Nominated
2025	Drama Desk Awards	Outstanding Costume Design of a Musical	Paul Tazewell	Nominated
2025	Drama Desk Awards	Outstanding Wig and Hair	Charles LaPointe	Won
2025	Drama League Awards	Outstanding Production of a Musical	Death Becomes Her	Nominated
2025	Drama League Awards	Outstanding Direction of a Musical	Christopher Gattelli	Nominated
2025	Drama League Awards	Distinguished Performance	Megan Hilty	Nominated
2025	Drama League Awards	Distinguished Performance	Jennifer Simard	Nominated
2025	Outer Critics Circle Awards	Outstanding New Broadway Musical	Death Becomes Her	Nominated
2025	Outer Critics Circle Awards	Outstanding Lead Performer in a Broadway Musical	Jennifer Simard	Nominated
2025	Outer Critics Circle Awards	Outstanding Featured Performer in a Broadway Musical	Christopher Sieber	Nominated
2025	Outer Critics Circle Awards	Outstanding Book of a Musical	Marco Pennette	Nominated
2025	Outer Critics Circle Awards	Outstanding New Score	Julia Mattison and Noel Carey	Nominated
2025	Outer Critics Circle Awards	Outstanding Orchestrations	Doug Besterman	Nominated
2025	Outer Critics Circle Awards	Direction of a Musical	Christopher Gattelli	Nominated
2025	Outer Critics Circle Awards	Outstanding Choreography	Christopher Gattelli	Nominated
2025	Outer Critics Circle Awards	Outstanding Scenic Design	Derek McLane	Nominated
2025	Outer Critics Circle Awards	Outstanding Costume Design	Paul Tazewell	Nominated
2025	Outer Critics Circle Awards	Outstanding Lighting Design	Justin Townsend	Nominated
2025	Outer Critics Circle Awards	Outstanding Sound Design	Peter Hylenski	Nominated
2025	Tony Awards	Best Musical	Death Becomes Her	Nominated
2025	Tony Awards	Best Actress in a Musical	Megan Hilty	Nominated
2025	Tony Awards	Best Actress in a Musical	Jennifer Simard	Nominated
2025	Tony Awards	Best Direction of a Musical	Christopher Gattelli	Nominated
2025	Tony Awards	Best Book of a Musical	Marco Pennette	Nominated
2025	Tony Awards	Best Original Score	Noel Carrey and Julia Mattison	Nominated
2025	Tony Awards	Best Scenic Design of a Musical	Derek McLane	Nominated
2025	Tony Awards	Best Costume Design of a Musical	Paul Tazewell	Won
2025	Tony Awards	Best Lighting Design of a Musical	Justin Townsend	Nominated
2025	Tony Awards	Best Choreography	Christopher Gattelli	Nominated
2025	Chita Rivera Awards	Outstanding Choreography in a Broadway Show	Christopher Gattelli	Nominated
2025	Dorian Awards	Outstanding Broadway Musical		Nominated
2026	Grammy Award	Best Musical Theater Album	Death Becomes Her (Original Broadway Cast Recording)	Nominated

== In popular culture ==
Several excerpts from the musical's cast recording have gone viral on TikTok, with creators lip-syncing to the lyrics of such songs as "Hit Me," "Tell Me, Ernest" and "Let's Run Away Together," among others.
