= Paul Huntley =

British wigmaker and hair designer (1933–2021)

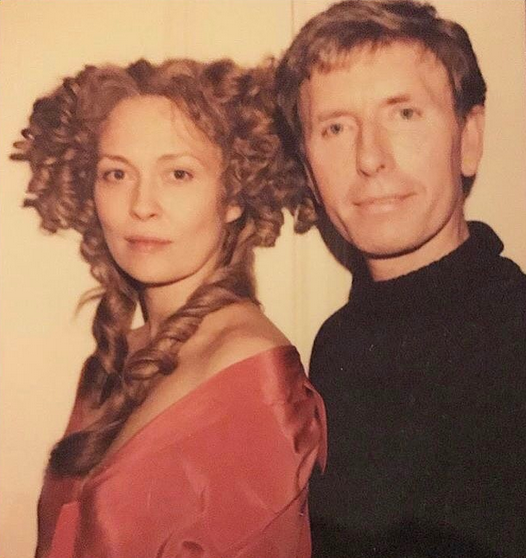
- Paul Huntley in 1983
- Born: 2 July 1933; London, England
- Died: 9 July 2021 (aged 88); London, England
- Occupations: Wigmaker, hair designer
- Partner: Paul Plassan (died 1991)
- Awards: Special Tony Award (2003)

Paul Huntley (2 July 1933 – 9 July 2021) was a British wigmaker and hair designer whose career in theatre, film, and television spanned more than 60 years. He created wigs and hairstyles for more than 200 Broadway and West End productions, as well as for numerous Hollywood films. Huntley's clients included many famous celebrities, among which Patti LuPone, Glenn Close, Carol Channing, Elizabeth Taylor, Alan Cumming, Sutton Foster, Jessica Lange, Betty Buckley, and Al Pacino.

== Early life ==
Huntley was born in London on 2 July 1933. His father was in the military, his mother was a homemaker. Fascinated by his mother’s film magazines and the transformational capabilities of a brush and comb, he developed an early interest in hairstyling. After completing national service following the Second World War, Huntley sought an apprenticeship in the film industry but instead trained to be an actor at the Central School of Speech and Drama, where he began designing wigs for productions.

In the 1950s he joined Stanley Hall’s Wig Creations in London, a theatrical company noted for fine lace wigs used in film close-ups. There Huntley became principal designer and got to work with Marlene Dietrich, Vivien Leigh and Laurence Olivier. He helped realize the elaborate braids for Elizabeth Taylor in the 1963 film Cleopatra. Taylor introduced him to film and theatre director Mike Nichols. He later invited Huntley to New York to design hair for the 1973 Broadway production of Uncle Vanya, launching his American career.

== Career ==
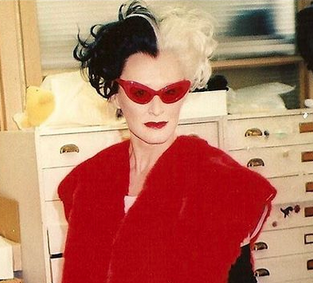
Glenn Close during a wig and costume fitting for 101 Dalmatians (1996)

In the subsequent decades Huntley became one of the most sought-after wig designers in theatre and film. On Broadway, his credits included Evita, Sweeney Todd, Hello, Dolly!, Cats, Thoroughly Modern Millie, Hairspray, Bullets Over Broadway, The Elephant Man, Chicago and Anything Goes. His film work included Tootsie (1982), The Addams Family (1991), 101 Dalmatians (1996), Synecdoche, New York (2008), and the HBO film Phil Spector (2013).

Huntley received a special Tony Award in 2003 recognising his contributions to theatrical design.

== Later life and death ==
Huntley continued to work into his late eighties, creating wigs for Diana: The Musical (2021), representing stages in the life of Diana, Princess of Wales. He retired after suffering a fall that fractured his pelvis and subsequently returned to Britain. Huntley died on 9 July 2021 in London at the age of 88 from a lung infection. His partner, Paul Plassan, with whom he shared both his home and business, died in 1991.

== See also ==
- Paul Huntley at IMDb
- Paul Huntley at the Internet Broadway Database
- 57th Tony Awards
- Drama Desk Award for Outstanding Wig and Hair Design
