= Quentin Earl Darrington =

American actor and singer

- Born: July 9, 1977 (age 49); Lakeland, Florida
- Education: University of South Florida
- Occupations: Actor; singer
- Years active: 2002–present

Quentin Earl Darrington (born July 9, 1977) is an American actor and singer known for his work in theatre. He has performed in Broadway productions and national tours of shows including Once on This Island, Cats, Ragtime, and Memphis. He originated the role of Joe Jackson / Rob in MJ the Musical on Broadway, receiving a nomination for the Outer Critics Circle Award for Outstanding Featured Actor in a Musical.

== Early life ==
Darrington was born in Lakeland, Florida, and he took his first drama class in seventh grade and subsequently applied to and attended an arts high school. He then attended the University of South Florida, graduating with a Bachelor of Arts in theatre in 2004.

== Career ==
Following graduation, Darrington moved to Indianapolis, Indiana and later to Chicago, Illinois while on tour with the musicals The Lion King, understudying Mufasa, and The Color Purple as Pa.

Throughout his career, Darrington has played the role of Coalhouse Walker Jr. in Ragtime several times: first on the 2001 non-equity tour, then in a 2005 production at Paper Mill Playhouse, followed by a production in 2009 at the Kennedy Center, which ultimately transferred to Broadway's Neil Simon Theatre in 2009. He would play the role once more in a production in 2010 at Drury Lane Theatre in Illinois. For the Broadway production, Variety praised Darrington's performance as "a charismatic presence who breathes real authority into his scenes" with praise for his "velvety baritone."

Other notable Broadway credits include the 2016 revival of aCats as Old Deuteronomy, and the 2017 Tony Award-winning revival of Once on This Island as Agwe.

He received his first Outer Critics Circle Award nomination for Outstanding Featured Actor in a Musical for his performance as Joe Jackson/Rob in the Broadway production of MJ the Musical at the Neil Simon Theatre. Other notable credits include starring as the Phantom in the 2026 Off-Broadway revival of The Phantom of the Opera, titled Masquerade. He is next set to appear in Jennifer Nettles' Off-Broadway musical, Giulia: The Poison Queen of Palermo in summer 2026 as Cardinale at the Perelman Arts Center.

== Personal life ==
Darrington currently resides part-time in Champaign, Illinois and has three sons.

== Theatre credits ==
Year	Show	Role	Notes
2001	Ragtime	Coalhouse Walker Jr.	U.S. national tour
2002	The Lion King	Ensemble u/s Mufasa	U.S. national tour
2003	The Lion King	Ensemble u/s Mufasa	Chicago, Cadillac Palace Theatre
2005	Ragtime	Coalhouse Walker Jr.	Regional, Paper Mill Playhouse
2005	Abyssinia	Lucas (replacement)	Regional, Goodspeed Opera House
2007	The Color Purple	Ensemble u/s Mister	U.S. national tour
2009	Ragtime	Coalhouse Walker Jr.	Washington D.C., Kennedy Center
2009	Ragtime	Coalhouse Walker Jr.	Broadway, Neil Simon Theatre
2010	Ragtime	Coalhouse Walker Jr.	Regional, Drury Lane Theatre
2011	Memphis	Delray	U.S. national tour
2014	Les Misérables	Javert	Regional, Drury Lane Theatre
2015	A New Brain	Minister	Off-Broadway, Off-City Center Encores!
2016	The Secret Garden	Major Holmes	Manhattan Concert Productions Concert
2016	Cats	Old Deuteronomy; Victor	Broadway, Neil Simon Theatre
2017	Once on This Island	Agwe	Broadway, Circle in the Square Theatre
2022	MJ the Musical	Joe Jackson / Rob	Broadway, Neil Simon Theatre
2025	Three Summers of Lincoln	Frederick Douglass	Regional, La Jolla Playhouse
2025	Damn Yankees	Joe Boyd	Washington D.C., Arena Stage
2026	The Phantom of the Opera	The Phantom of the Opera	Off-Broadway, Masquerade Theatre Studios
2026	Giulia: The Poison Queen of Palermo	Cardinale	Off-Broadway, Perelman Arts Center

== Awards and nominations ==
Year	Award	Category	Work	Result	Ref.
2022	Outer Critics Circle Award	Outstanding Featured Actor in a Musical	MJ: The Musical	Nominated	
