= Myles Frost =

American actor (born 1999)

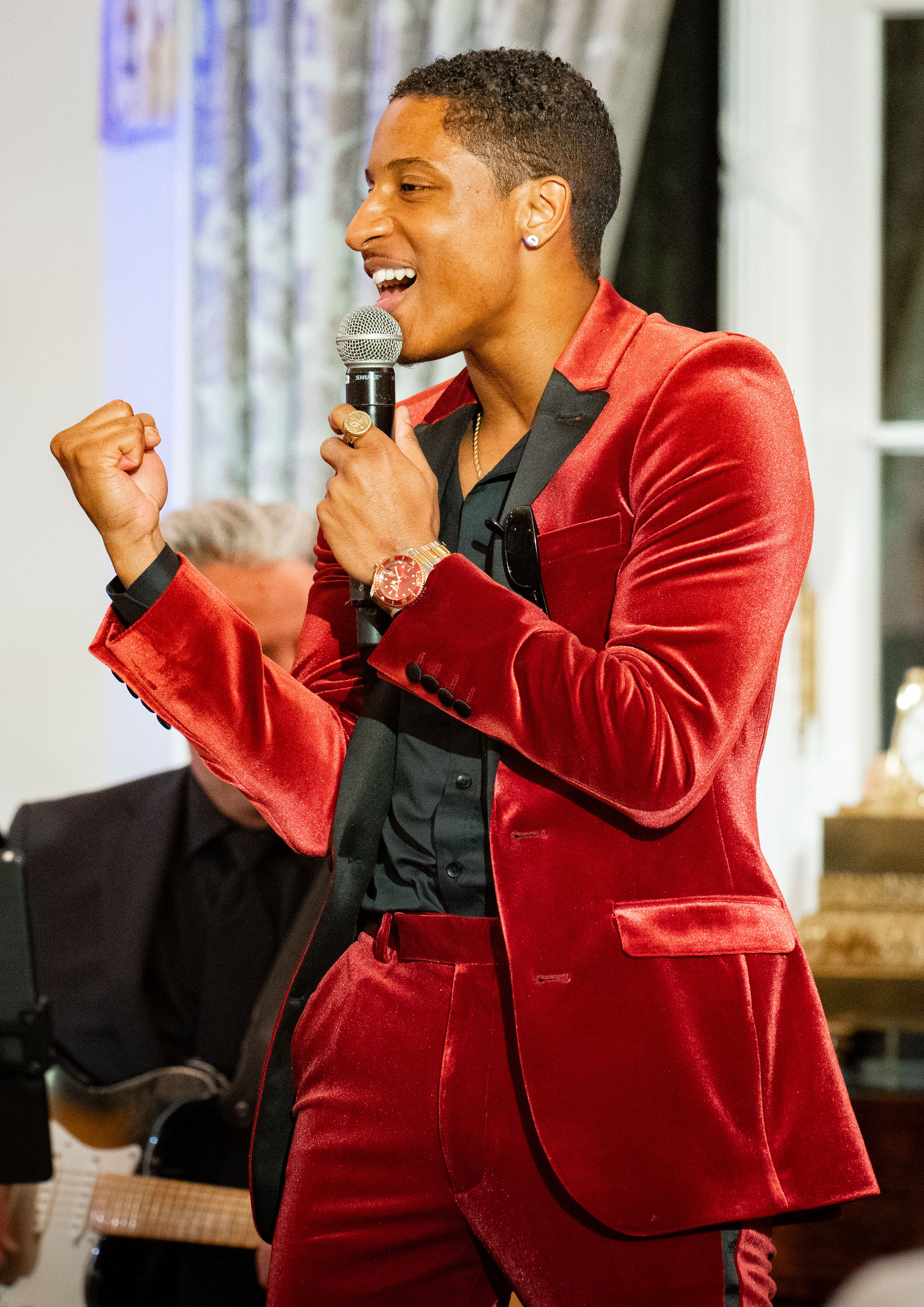
- Frost in 2023
- Born: July 21, 1999 (age 25); Silver Spring, Maryland, U.S.
- Education: Belmont University; Bowie State University
- Occupation: Actor
- Years active: 2019–present

Myles Frost (born July 21, 1999) is an American actor, singer, songwriter, music producer and dancer. He won the 2022 Tony Award for Best Actor in a Musical for his portrayal of Michael Jackson in the Broadway production of MJ the Musical and received a Grammy Award nomination for the cast recording.

== Life and career ==
Frost was born in Silver Spring, Maryland. He spent his early years moving back and forth between Maryland and Washington, D.C. Raised by his mother, Charmayne Strayhorn, a systems engineer, and his grandmother, a school teacher, he developed two enduring passions early in life: golf, beginning at the age of three, and piano, beginning at the age of five. Growing up he sang and played the piano and drums at church, and he performed in an R&B cover band in middle school at local shopping centers. While attending Thomas S. Wootton High School in Rockville, Maryland, he performed in school productions of the musicals Hairspray (as Seaweed), Legally Blonde (as Warner), and Cinderella (as Lord Pinkleton). In 2017, while still in high school, he was a contestant on The Voice but was not selected by any of the coaches to move further in the competition.

After graduating from high school, Frost entered Belmont University in Nashville where he studied music technology for two years. He transferred from Belmont to Bowie State University as an audio engineering major, but ultimately left school when he was cast as Michael Jackson in the Broadway production of MJ the Musical. Frost earned the role after Ephraim Sykes left the production late in the show's development, and the producers had to locate a new actor rapidly. The production team auditioned many established actors, but none of them was working, and broadened their search. A YouTube video of Frost performing the song "Billie Jean" from a high school talent show drew the attention of the producers, and he was invited to audition; ultimately winning the part. Earning positive critical attention, Frost won the 2022 Tony Award for Best Actor in a Musical for his portrayal of Michael Jackson around the age of 28–33 in the Broadway theatre production of MJ the Musical. He is the youngest solo recipient of the Tony Award in the "Best Actor in a Musical" category, a record previously held by Ben Platt. Myles left the production on April 2, 2023. He was replaced by Elijah Johnson of Mindless Behavior on April 4, 2023. He then went on to reprise the role as MJ in the West End production that opened in March 27, 2024, and eventually left the production on January 11, 2025, while Jamaal Fields-Green took over as MJ on January 14, 2025.

== Filmography ==
=== Film ===
Year	Title	Role	Notes
2023	Origin	Trayvon Martin	

=== Television ===
Year	Title	Role	Notes
2017	The Voice	Himself/Contestant	Not selected/No chair turn
2019	All In	Shane	Television movie
2019–2020	Family Reunion	Vocal appearance	3 episodes (seasons 1 & 2)
2021	American Gangster Presents: The Big 50	Clarence	BET+ original movie

== Awards and nominations ==
Year	Award	Category	Work	Result	Ref.
2022	Tony Award	Best Performance by a Leading Actor in a Musical	MJ the Musical	Won	
2023	Grammy Awards	Best Musical Theater Album	MJ the Musical	Nominated	
2025	WhatsOnStage	Best Performer in a Musical	MJ the Musical	Nominated	
2025	Laurence Olivier Awards	Best Actor in a Musical	MJ the Musical	Nominated	
