= MJ the Musical =

Jukebox musical

MJ
- The Musical
- Broadway poster
- Music: Various artists
- Lyrics: Various artists
- Book: Lynn Nottage
- Basis: The life and music of Michael Jackson
- Premiere: December 6, 2021: Neil Simon Theatre, New York City
- Productions: 2021 Broadway; 2023 U.S. Tour; 2024 West End; 2024 Hamburg; 2025 Australia; 2026 Asia Tour; 2027 UK Tour
- Awards: Full list

MJ the Musical is a jukebox musical based on the life of the American entertainer Michael Jackson, focusing on his preparations for the 1992 Dangerous World Tour. It features Jackson's music, a book by Lynn Nottage, and direction and choreography by Christopher Wheeldon.

MJ the Musical was originally scheduled to premiere on Broadway, Manhattan, on August 13, 2020, but was postponed due to the COVID-19 pandemic in New York City. In November 2019, Ephraim Sykes was cast as Jackson, but in June 2021 it was announced that he had been replaced by Myles Frost. MJ began previews at the Neil Simon Theatre on December 6, 2021, and opened on February 1, 2022. It opened in the London West End on March 27, 2024 and closed on February 28, 2026.

MJ the Musical received mixed reviews. It was nominated for 10 Tony Awards, including Best Musical, and won Best Actor in a Musical for Frost, Best Choreography, Best Lighting Design and Best Sound Design. The cast recording was nominated for the Grammy Award for Best Musical Theater Album. By March 2026, the Broadway production had grossed over $319 million and sold more than seven million tickets worldwide.

== Synopsis ==
=== Act I ===
In June 1992, the cast members are preparing for rehearsals for Jackson's upcoming Dangerous World Tour; the first show, in Munich, is in two days. Rob, their manager, tells them to get into their places and warm up. Jackson arrives and watches the process, which leads to the opening number ("Beat It").

As Jackson shares his newest ideas with Rob, Rachel arrives with her cameraman, Alejandro, in hopes of getting an interview with Jackson. He sits with Rachel and recounts some of the terrors he suffered as a child and some of the memorable times when Berry Gordy played his family's hits on his Motown label. Jackson also discusses his collaboration with Quincy Jones and recording his albums Off the Wall, Thriller and Bad with Jones.

Rob and Nick escort Jackson to the press conference at Radio City Music Hall, where he presents his tour and hopes to raise $100 million for the Heal the World Foundation by Christmas 1993 ("Earth Song" / "They Don't Care About Us").

=== Act II ===
Jackson proposes new ideas for the tour ("Billie Jean"/"Smooth Criminal"), which Rob and Dave tell him are impractical and that they cannot afford it. Jackson recounts the horrific accident in 1984 when a spark ignited his hair in the making of an advertisement for Pepsi. After listening to Rob's negative feedback, Jackson reminds him of something Quincy said to him, "Keep the faith. Don't let nobody take you down".

As the rehearsal continues, Jackson tells Rachel how the songs open up to him. During a break, a commotion breaks out. Rob tries to keep Rachel away from Jackson and doesn't want her near him, but Jackson manages to find her by disguising himself as a cleaner. He explains to her that the disguise is the only way he can be seen in public, which leads to him singing "Human Nature". After the rehearsal, Jackson explains to Rachel how emotional he feels about being loved by fans and about being teased in the newspapers.

As Rob comes to check up on him, Jackson recalls when he played at the Apollo Theater with the Jackson 5 and how he wasn't nervous. Rob tells Jackson that everything they created would be remembered for decades, but Jackson replies by asking: "Is it perfect?" ("Man in the Mirror"). Jackson appears on stage, prepared to start the first show of the Dangerous Tour ("Jam (Reprise)", "Black or White" / "Wanna Be Startin' Somethin' (Reprise)".

== Cast and characters ==
Character	Broadway	US National Tour	West End	Hamburg	Australia
Character	2021	2023	2024	2024	2025
Michael Jackson	Myles Frost	Roman Banks	Myles Frost	Benét Monteiro	Roman Banks / Ilario Grant
Teenage Michael / Young Adult Michael	Tavon Olds-Sample	Brandon Lee Harris	Mitchell Zhangazha	Prince Damien	Liam Damons
Little Michael	Christian Wilson / Walter Russell III	Josiah Benson / Ethan Joseph	Jaydon Eastman / Elliot Mugume / Ethan Sokontwe / Dylan Trigger	Luan Kizua	Blaiyze Barksdale / William Bonner / Cayden Dosoruth / Daniel Makunike / Ben Bonner / Kayleb Alese
Jackie Jackson	John Edwards	Jay McKenzie	Tavio Wright	Prince Orji	Kyle Kavully / Tavio Wright
Tito Jackson / Quincy Jones	Apollo Levine	Josh A. Dawson	Rohan Pinnock-Hamilton	DNPRI	Conlon Bonner
Jermaine Jackson	Lamont Walker II	Bryson Jacobi Jackson	Simeon Montague	William Baugh	Loredo Malcolm
Little Marlon	Devin Trey Campbell	Jaylen Lyndon Hunter	Cristiano Cuino / Sekhani Dumezweni / Khanya Madaka / Aidan Oti	Nayo	Kayleb Alese / Charlie Batchelor / Zavier Pillay / Kael Smith / William Bonner
Marlon Jackson	Zelig Williams	Brion Marquis Watson	Toyan Thomas-Browne	Rafael Portela	Xavier Gibson
Randy Jackson	Raymond Baynard	Malcolm Miles Young	Aden Dzuda	Caleaf Henson	G Madison IV
Joe Jackson / Rob	Quentin Earl Darrington	Devin Bowles	Ashley Zhangazha	David Hughey	Derrick Davis / J.Daughtry
Katherine Jackson	Ayana George	Anastasia Talley	Phebe Edwards	Jessica Mears	Josslynn Hlenti Afoa / Oyoyo Joi
Berry Gordy / Nick	Antoine L. Smith	J. Daughtry	Matt Mills	Perci Moeketsi	Wonza Johnson / Kyle Lamar Mitchell
Rachel	Whitney Bashor	Mary Kate Moore	Philippa Stefani	Eve Rades	Penny McNamee
Alejandro	Gabriel Ruíz	Da'von Moody	Matt Gonsalves	Pedro Reichert	Yashith Fernando
Dave	Joey Sorge	Matt Loehr	Jon Tsouras	Mario Gremlich	Tim Wright

=== Notable cast replacements ===
==== Broadway (2021–2025) ====
- Michael Jackson: Elijah Johnson
- Katherine Jackson: Sasha Allen

== Musical numbers ==
Act I

- "Beat It" – MJ, Company, and Orchestra
- "Tabloid Junkie" / "Price of Fame" – MJ and Rachel
- "Shout" / "Papa's Got a Brand New Bag" / "(Your Love Keeps Lifting Me) Higher and Higher" – Ensemble
- "Climb Ev'ry Mountain" – Little Michael
- "The Love You Save" / "I Want You Back" / "ABC" – Little Michael, Little Marlon, Jermaine, Tito, Jackie
- "I'll Be There" – Katherine, Little Michael, MJ
- "Don't Stop 'Til You Get Enough" / "Blame It on the Boogie" / "Dancing Machine" – MJ, Teenage Michael, Marlon, Jermaine, Tito, Jackie and Company
- "Stranger in Moscow" – MJ
- "You Can't Win" – Berry Gordy and Teenage Michael
- "I Can't Help It" – Quincy Jones and Young Adult Michael
- "Keep the Faith" – Quincy Jones and Young Adult Michael
- "Wanna Be Startin' Somethin'" – Young Adult Michael, MJ and Ensemble
- "Earth Song" / "They Don't Care About Us" – MJ and Ensemble

Act II

- "Billie Jean" – MJ
- "Smooth Criminal" – MJ and Ensemble
- "For the Love of Money" / "Can You Feel It" – Joseph Jackson, Young Adult Michael, Marlon, Jermaine, Tito, Jackie and Orchestra
- "Money" – Joseph Jackson
- "Keep the Faith (Reprise)" – Rob, MJ, and Ensemble
- "She's Out of My Life" – MJ and Young Adult Michael
- "Jam" – MJ, Ensemble, and Orchestra
- "Human Nature" – MJ and Rachel
- "Bad" / "2 Bad" – MJ, Company and Orchestra
- "Price of Fame (Reprise)" – MJ
- "Thriller" – Little Michael, MJ, Joseph Jackson and Ensemble
- "Man in the Mirror" – Company
- "Jam (Reprise)" / "Black or White" / "Wanna Be Startin' Somethin' (Reprise)" – Company
- "Working Day and Night" – Orchestra

Performances on October 31 also include a special Halloween closing number of "Thriller"

=== Recordings ===
Recording for the original Broadway cast album took place on February 7 and 8, 2022. The original Broadway cast recording was released on July 15, 2022. The original cast recording was nominated for a Grammy Award for Best Musical Theater Album.

== Development ==
The musical was announced in June 2018 with the backing of Michael Jackson's estate. It was originally titled Don't Stop 'Til You Get Enough. Wheeldon likened it to the 2012 biographical film Lincoln: "The show is very much anchored in one particular moment in time ... You take one key moment, I suppose, in the history of someone's life and then sort of use that as an anchor point for past storytelling and, perhaps, some kind of prophecy of what's to come. We'll be doing that with this story."

== Productions ==
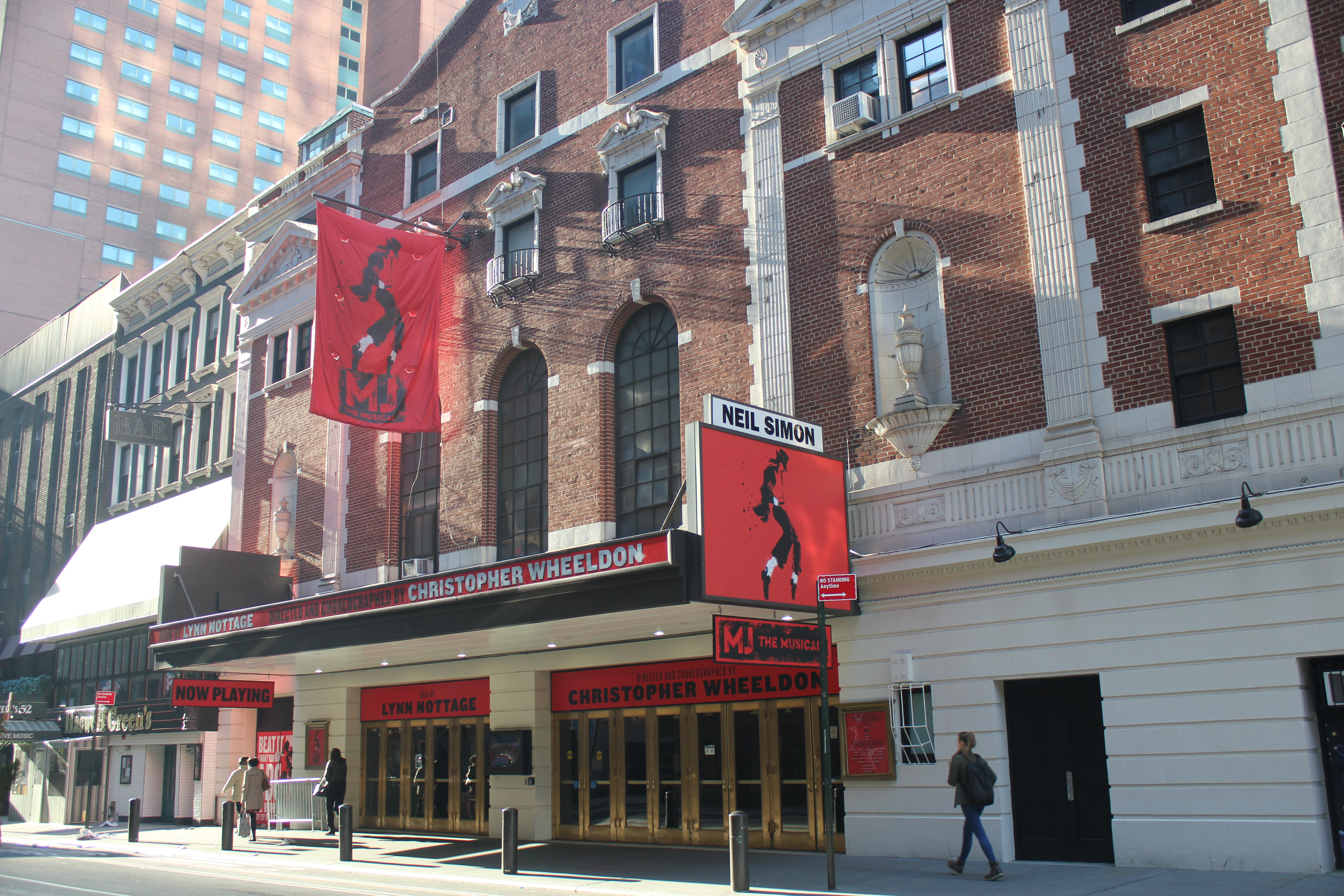
Branding on the Neil Simon Theatre, Manhattan

=== Broadway (2021) ===
MJ the Musical was scheduled to premiere in Chicago in 2019, at the Nederlander Theatre. The Michael Jackson estate canceled the Chicago tryout due to "scheduling difficulties" brought about by an Actors' Equity Association strike.

MJ the Musical was scheduled to premiere on Broadway, Manhattan, on 13 August 2020, but was postponed due to the COVID-19 pandemic in New York City. The production is directed and choreographed by Christopher Wheeldon, and features a book by two-time Pulitzer Prize winner Lynn Nottage. Scenery for the production is designed by Derek McLane with costuming by Paul Tazewell. Natasha Katz and Peter Nigrini are collaborating on lighting and projection designs respectively. Gareth Owen designed sound production, with hair and wig design by Charles LaPointe. Elijah Johnson took over as Jackson in March 2023 until August 2025. Matte Martinez replaced him that September.

=== Other regions ===
A national tour began in Chicago at the Nederlander Theatre on August 1, 2023, and is scheduled to run through August 3, 2025. Jamaal Fields-Green took over as Jackson in July 2024. Jordan Markus took over as Jackson in February 2025.

In London, MJ the Musical opened in the West End at the Prince Edward Theatre, with previews beginning March 6, 2024 and an official opening night on March 27. Frost reprised his role as Jackson. Jamaal Fields-Green reprised the role in January 2025. It closed on February 28, 2026, after running for less than two years. It is set to tour across the United Kingdom in 2027. A German production is expected to play the Stage Theater an der Elbe at Hamburg. Dialogue will be in German with the musical numbers remaining in English. Performances are scheduled to begin on December 1, 2024.

An Australian production opened at the Sydney Lyric Theatre on February 26, 2025. Banks reprised his role as Jackson. After the Sydney production was closed on August 23, the Melbourne production arrived at Her Majesty's Theatre with Ilario Grant leading the role as Jackson on September 9. The show's first international tour is set to begin in October 2026 in major cities across Asia for an initial two-year run.

== Box office ==
Ticket sales have averaged more than a million dollars per week on Broadway. Following the Tony Awards, the weekly gross jumped to $1,661,000, with sold-out shows and brisk advance sales; it received the biggest box office jump that week on Broadway and recorded a new high for the show's sales. By September 4, 2022, it broke the Neil Simon Theater's box office record five times with a total cumulative gross of $49.4 million. As of March 2026, MJ the Musical on Broadway has grossed around $319 Million with a total attendance of 2,245,873 after 1,701 performances. MJ The Musical has ranked amongst the top five highest grossing annual Broadway shows each year since its release. By April 2024, MJ the Musical had sold more than two million tickets worldwide eventually reaching sales of over 5 million by August 2025 & 7 Million by March 2026.

== Critical response ==
The Deadline reporter Greg Evans said MJ was "visually and sonically ravishing", while the Chicago Tribune called the show's scenery gorgeous and the show "beautiful to experience throughout, which one almost never can say about jukebox musicals". Peter Marks of The Washington Post also praised the show and the cast, especially the "utterly persuasive" Frost, and called MJ "a riveting, adrenaline rush of a show". Linda Armstrong of Amsterdam News called the production "spectacular", "stunning" and "off-the-charts". Joe Westerfield of Newsweek said, "In many ways MJ is a living, breathing, even breathless, music video, but with that touch of inspiration, drive and art that only Michael Jackson can provide."

Charles Isherwood of Broadway News criticized Lynn Nottage's book, writing, "where MJ loses its fleet footing is in the bland, exposition-heavy and often trite dialogue supplied by Nottage ... Clichés, preachy speeches, and baldly obvious dialogue abound." Adam Feldman of Time Out wrote, "'Listen to my music,' says Michael to his interviewer. 'It answers any questions you might have.' Does it? I left the theater entertained, but not convinced I had seen the man in the smoke and mirrors." Maya Phillips of The New York Times wrote, "The musical is inherently hollow; the opacity of Michael Jackson and his life of traumas and controversies make it difficult to find material compelling and cohesive enough to tell a story onstage". Reviewing the West End show in 2024, Anya Ryan of the Guardian wrote that Jackson's music had "an otherworldly magic", but found the show "sterilised" and was troubled by the allegations of sexual abuse against Jackson. She concluded: "Some might be able to separate Jackson's art from the artist. But as Frost took his final bow and the audience leaped to their feet, I felt queasy – bad, even."

== Awards and nominations ==
=== Original Broadway production ===
Year	Award	Category	Nominee	Result	Ref.
2022	Tony Awards	Best Musical	MJ the Musical	Nominated	
2022	Tony Awards	Best Actor in a Musical	Myles Frost	Won	
2022	Tony Awards	Best Direction of a Musical	Christopher Wheeldon	Nominated	
2022	Tony Awards	Best Choreography	Christopher Wheeldon & Rich + Tone Talauega	Won	
2022	Tony Awards	Best Book of a Musical	Lynn Nottage	Nominated	
2022	Tony Awards	Best Orchestrations	Jason Michael Webb & David Holcenberg	Nominated	
2022	Tony Awards	Best Scenic Design of a Musical	Derek McLane & Peter Nigrini	Nominated	
2022	Tony Awards	Best Costume Design of a Musical	Paul Tazewell	Nominated	
2022	Tony Awards	Best Lighting Design of a Musical	Natasha Katz	Won	
2022	Tony Awards	Best Sound Design of a Musical	Gareth Owen	Won	
2022	Chita Rivera Awards	Outstanding Ensemble in a Broadway Show	MJ the Musical	Nominated	
2022	Chita Rivera Awards	Outstanding Male Dancer in a Broadway Show	Myles Frost	Won	
2022	Chita Rivera Awards	Outstanding Choreography in a Broadway Show	Christopher Wheeldon	Nominated	
2022	Drama Desk Awards	Outstanding Actor in a Musical	Myles Frost	Nominated	
2022	Drama Desk Awards	Outstanding Featured Actor in a Musical	Tavon Olds-Sample	Nominated	
2022	Drama Desk Awards	Outstanding Choreography	Christopher Wheeldon, Rich and Tone Taleuega & Michael Balderrama	Nominated	
2022	Drama Desk Awards	Outstanding Orchestrations	Jason Michael Webb & David Holcenberg	Won	
2022	Drama Desk Awards	Outstanding Lighting Design	Natasha Katz	Won	
2022	Drama Desk Awards	Outstanding Sound Design in a Musical	Gareth Owen	Won	
2022	Drama Desk Awards	Outstanding Wig and Hair Design	Charles LaPointe	Nominated	
2022	Drama League Awards	Outstanding Production of a Musical	MJ the Musical	Nominated	
2022	Drama League Awards	Distinguished Performance	Myles Frost	Nominated	
2022	Drama League Awards	Outstanding Direction of a Musical	Christopher Wheeldon	Nominated	
2022	Grammy Awards	Best Musical Theater Album	Myles Frost (principal vocalist), Tavon Olds-Sample (principal vocalist), David Holcenberg (producer), Derik Lee (producer), Jason Michael Webb (producer)	Nominated	
2022	Outer Critics Circle Awards	Outstanding New Broadway Musical	MJ the Musical	Nominated	
2022	Outer Critics Circle Awards	Outstanding Actor in a Musical	Myles Frost	Nominated	
2022	Outer Critics Circle Awards	Outstanding Direction of a Musical	Christopher Wheeldon	Nominated	
2022	Outer Critics Circle Awards	Outstanding Choreography	Christopher Wheeldon & Rich + Tone Talauega	Won	
2022	Outer Critics Circle Awards	Outstanding Featured Actor in a Musical	Quentin Earl Darrington	Nominated	
2022	Outer Critics Circle Awards	Outstanding Orchestrations	Jason Michael Webb & David Holcenberg	Nominated	
2022	Outer Critics Circle Awards	Outstanding Lighting Design	Natasha Katz	Nominated	
2022	Theatre World Awards	Outstanding Debut Performance	Myles Frost	Won	

=== Original West End production ===
Year	Award	Category	Nominee	Result	Ref.
2024	Black British Theatre Awards	Best Musical	MJ the Musical	Won	
2024	Black British Theatre Awards	Best Musical Director	Sean Green	Won	
2024	Black British Theatre Awards	Best Graduate	Kwamè Kandekore	Won	
2024	Black British Theatre Awards	Best Child Performer	Dylan Trigger	Nominated	
2024	Black British Theatre Awards	Best Supporting Female Actor in a Musical	Phebe Edwards	Nominated	
2025	Laurence Olivier Awards	Best New Musical	MJ The Musical	Nominated	
2025	Laurence Olivier Awards	Best Actor in a Musical	Myles Frost	Nominated	
2025	Laurence Olivier Awards	Best Theatre Choreographer	Christopher Wheeldon	Won	

== See also ==
- Motown: The Musical, a 2013 musical about Motown record label
