= Hair and wig designer =

Theatrical costume specialist

A theatrical hair and wig designer works with the theatre director and costume designer to create appropriate looks that define each performer in a theatre production. This includes becoming familiar with the script, meeting with the director and costume designer, conducting any research that may be required, and developing designs for each performer while working within the budget.

== Aspects of the job ==
The first step in the design process is to become familiar with the script, its characters, and any transformations they may make (e.g., from naïve to sophisticated or young to older). The designer also needs to be aware of any special effects that might be needed. The design might entail research into the period of the show, the characters’ class or other characteristics, and whether the director’s concept involves any updates or other changes to the standard design features. The designer also needs to determine which performers will be using their own hair and which will need one or more wigs.

There are many considerations that affect the hair designer’s work. Aside from what the director and costume designer want, there is the budget. A custom, hand-tied, human-hair wig can run upwards of $2,500. How much movement the actor does will affect both the design of the wig and how it’s anchored, as well as the type of mic and mic pack the actor will wear. The actor’s coloring and the colors used by the costumer and lighting designer also play into the hair designer’s decisions.

Depending on the budget and size of the production staff, the hair designer may also be the makeup designer. In larger professional productions, the designer will have a crew to help with hair, makeup, or both. Over the course of a show's run, the designer keeps the wigs in good condition, touching up or restyling them as needed. During performances, the hair designer may need to help with quick costume changes.

== Getting into the field ==
There are many paths to becoming a theatrical hair designer. One of the traditional paths is to get a cosmetology license or to learn fashion, costume, or hair design. Some conservatories and universities offer degrees in hair styling and design. Aspiring designers can also take specialized workshops or seminars and get practical experience working in community theater or as an apprentice to a professional designer.

There are also unions that offer training and a network of professional opportunities. In the US, those interested in makeup and hair jobs can join the Make-up Artists and Hair Stylists Guild or the International Alliance of Theatrical Stage Employees (IATSE). IATSE also has local divisions in some places in Canada. The UK union, BECTU (Broadcasting Entertainment Cinematograph and Theatre Union), is less specialized.
