= Rouse Simmons =

Three-masted schooner sunk in Lake Michigan

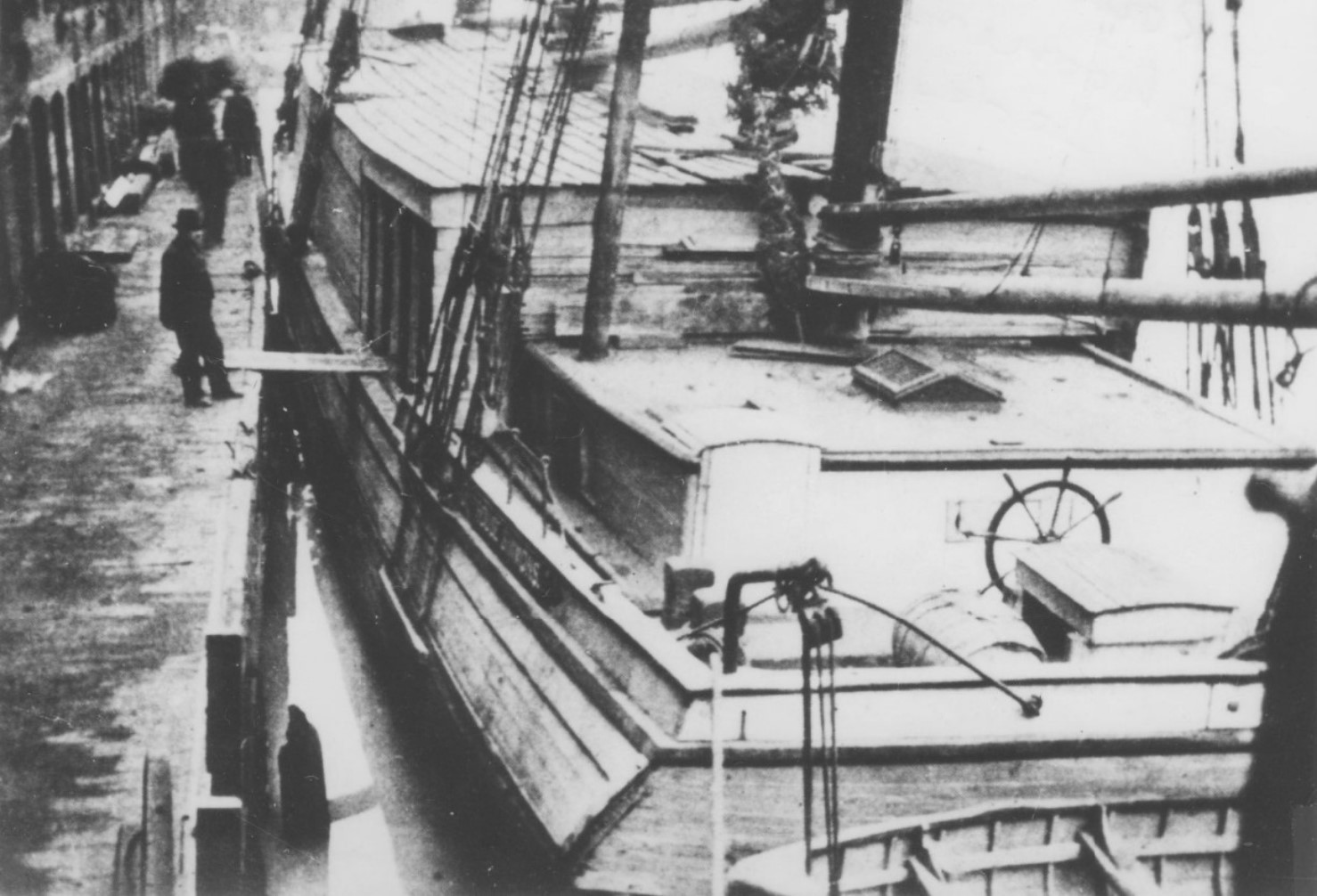
- Rouse Simmons tied up to dock c. 1900

History

United States
- Name: Rouse Simmons
- Builder: Allen, McCelland & Co.; Milwaukee, Wisconsin
- Launched: August 15, 1868
- Identification: US 110087
- Nickname(s): "Christmas Tree Ship"
- Fate: Foundered and sunk on November 23, 1912

General characteristics
- Class & type: Three-masted schooner
- Tonnage: 205 GRT; 195 NRT
- Length: 123.5 ft (37.6 m)
- Beam: 27.6 ft (8.4 m)
- Height: 8.4 ft (2.6 m)
- Propulsion: Sails
- Crew: 5
- Notes: 17 persons lost in sinking
- Rouse Simmons (shipwreck)
- U.S. National Register of Historic Places
- Location within Wisconsin Location within the United States
- Location: Lake Michigan, 6 miles (9.7 km) off Point Beach, Wisconsin
- Coordinates: 44°16′30.6″N 87°24′56.4″W
- MPS: Great Lakes Shipwreck Sites of Wisconsin MPS
- NRHP reference No.: 07000197
- Added to NRHP: March 21, 2007

Rouse Simmons was a three-masted schooner famous for having sunk in a violent storm on Lake Michigan in 1912. The ship was bound for Chicago with a cargo of Christmas trees when it foundered off Two Rivers, Wisconsin, killing all on board.

The legacy of the schooner lives on in the area, with frequent ghost sightings and tourist attractions whereby its final route is traced. It was known as The Christmas Tree Ship and was one of many schooners to transport Christmas trees across the lake. However, with railroads, highways, and tree farms proving much more economical, the tree-shipping industry was on a steep decline and by 1920 they stopped sailing.

== History ==
The Rouse Simmons was built in Milwaukee in 1868 by Allan, McClelland, & Company, and named after Kenosha businessman Rouse Simmons. The schooner was soon purchased by wealthy lumber magnate Charles H. Hackley of Muskegon, Michigan and joined his sizeable fleet. Hackley's ships served across most of Lake Michigan's coastline, and the Rouse Simmons became a workhorse, shipping lumber from company mills to several ports around the lake for around 20 years. At its peak the schooner was making almost weekly runs between Grand Haven and Chicago.

After its service for Hackley the ship exchanged hands several times. Many similar schooners were also frequently sold and they became known as "tramp ships". In 1910 Herman Schuenemann bought an interest in the ship, expanding that to an eighth in 1912. The other shares were owned by Captain Charles Nelson of Chicago, who owned one eighth and would sail alongside Schuenemann on the fatal journey, and three fourths (the commanding share) were owned by Mannes J. Bonner, a businessman from St. James, Michigan.

=== The "Christmas Tree Ship" ===
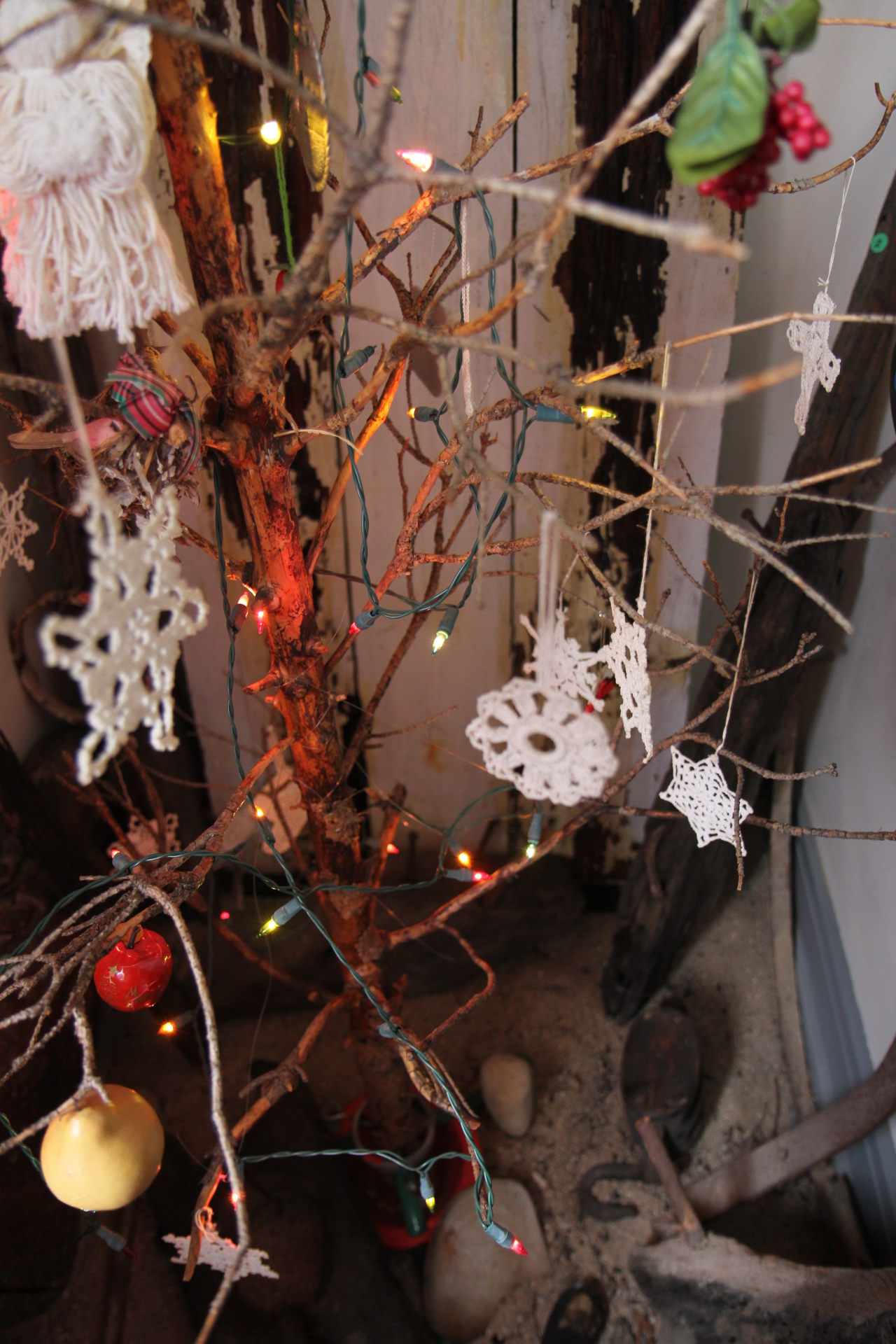
Recovered Christmas tree from the shipwreck

The Schuenemann brothers, Herman and August, began trading Christmas trees in Chicago in the 1890s. August died in November 1898 aboard the S. Thal – a 52-ton, two-masted schooner – when it sank in a storm near Glencoe, Illinois. His younger brother continued the family business. While many rival traders had sold to wholesalers and local grocers, Schuenemann sold directly to Chicago residents at dockside by the Clark Street Bridge. By cutting out the middleman in this way the trees could be sold cheaply while still making a profit. The venture used the slogan "Christmas Tree Ship: My Prices are the Lowest", with electric Christmas lights and a tree atop the main mast. The trees were sold for between 50 cents and $1, but Herman Schuenemann, affectionately known as "Captain Santa", also gave away some of the trees to needy families.

=== Final journey ===
Christmas Tree Ship
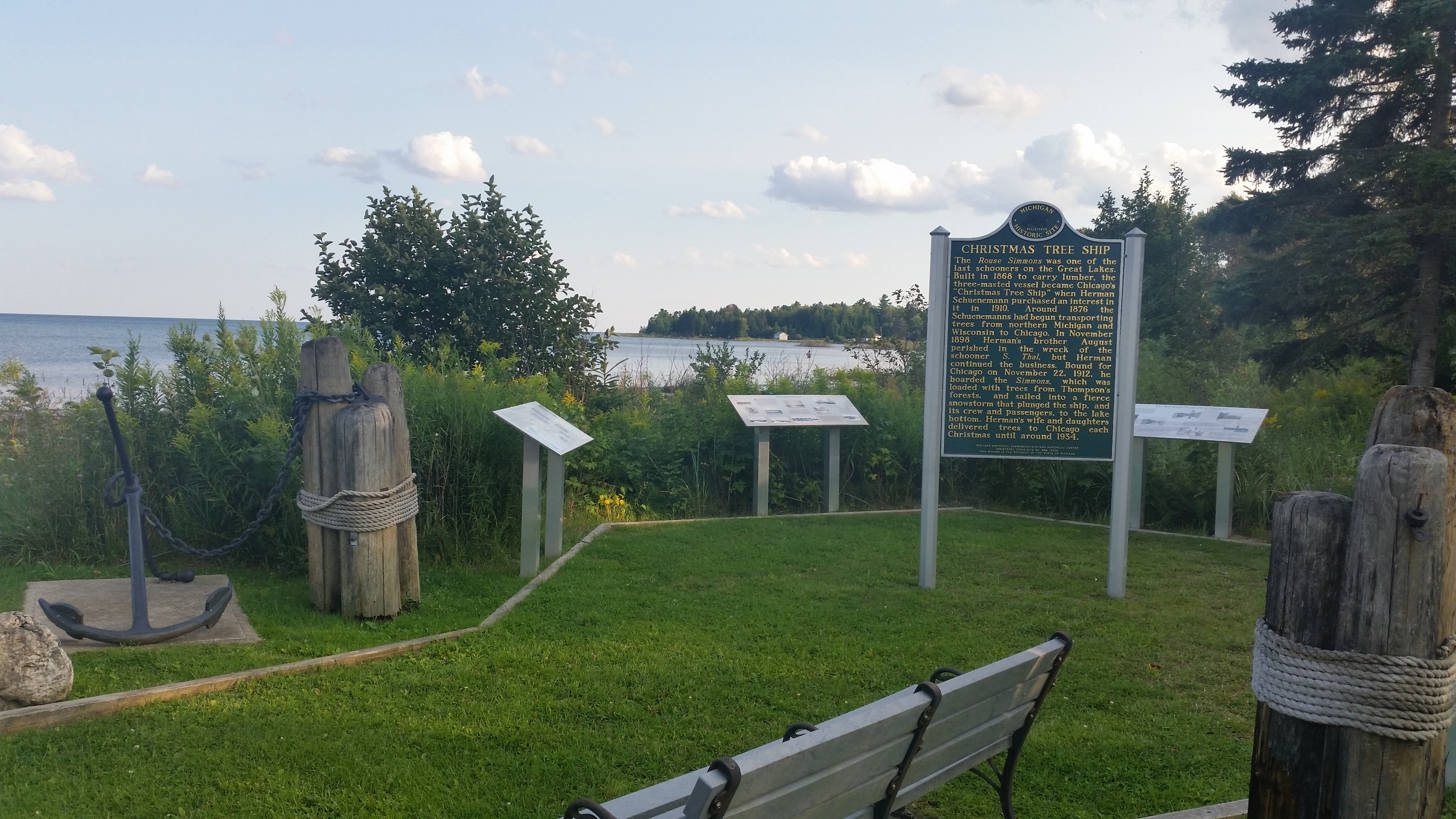
- Michigan state historic marker whence the Rouse Simmons departed for its final voyage

- Location within the state of Michigan
- 45°54′24.3″N 86°19′28.0″W
- Location: U.S. Route 2 Thompson Township, Michigan

Michigan State Historic Site
- Designated: April 13, 2006

Schuenemann loaded the schooner with 5,500 trees from Thompson Harbor near Manistique, Michigan and planned to make the week-long journey to Chicago. The difficult weather had discouraged his competitors from making their own journeys, and snow had covered the tree farms in Michigan and Wisconsin. He hoped that the resultant shortage of Christmas trees would lead to a huge profit and solve his financial problems.

By 1912, November already had a reputation for especially violent storms on the Great Lakes. November 1912, however, had been relatively quiet, with only one significant storm so far, which affected especially southeastern Michigan and northwestern Ohio. (The reports that say another storm had already taken many lives and ships that month are erroneous, confusing 1912 with the Big Blow of 1913.) Still, a second storm was brewing. The conditions of the day were very poor, with many ships anchoring in port for shelter to avoid being battered by the 60-mile-per-hour (52 kn; 97 km/h) winds that could be anticipated in a November gale.

Local legends say that some sailors refused to board the ship and that the vessel was unseaworthy. Two years earlier the schooner had been towed to port by The Grand Haven Tribune after it was found riding low in the water. Despite this the journey began at noon, with trees crammed into every possible corner of the ship. The weight of the trees was far above recommendations, especially in the bad winter weather, and was certainly going to contribute to the tragedy.

When the Kewaunee Life Saving Station spotted the Rouse Simmons on 23 November 1912 it was low in the water with tattered sails, flying its flag at half mast to signal that it was in distress. Logs from the station show that a surfman spotted the Rouse Simmons at 2:50pm and alerted station keeper Nelson Craite. Craite found that the station's gas tugboat had left earlier in the day and, at 3:10pm, Craite telephoned the nearest other Station. George E. Sogge of Two Rivers, located just south of Kewaunee, sent out the power boat Tuscarora on a rescue mission, but the Rouse Simmons was not seen again.

The Rouse Simmons was not the only ship to go down during the storm, with the South Shore, the Three Sisters, and the Two Brothers suffering similar fates.

=== Wreck and debris ===
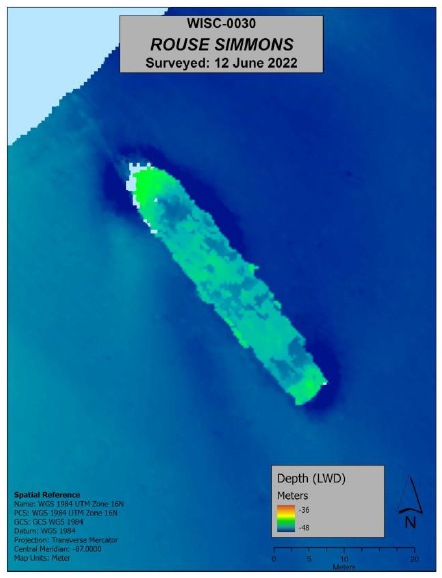
Sonar image of the wreck of Rouse Simmons, June 12, 2022.

In December 1912 Christmas trees and wreckage were reported ashore at Pentwater, Michigan. In 1924 a fishing net trawled up a wallet belonging to Captain Schuenemann. The wallet, well preserved because it was wrapped in oilskin, contained business cards, a newspaper clipping and an expense memorandum. In 1971 the wreck itself was discovered by scuba diver Gordon Kent Bellrichard from Milwaukee. Bellrichard was searching for the Vernon, a 177-foot, 700-ton steamer that had sunk in a storm in October 1887, and had been told about an area in which local fishermen had frequently snagged their nets. When his sonar appeared to have located something he dived down to a shipwreck on the bed of the lake 172 feet (52 m) below. Despite his light failing, Bellrichard managed to survey the wreckage with his hands and concluded that he had instead found the Rouse Simmons.

A forensic study of the wreck suggests that the ship had steerage and was sailing for shelter when it sank. The mizzen mast snapped off above the deck and the upper portion was not located. The main mast was found forward and to the port side of the wreck with the base missing. The foremast is intact and lies nearly parallel to but on top of the main mast, suggesting that at least one of these masts fell out of the mast step as the ship sank.

Many of the trees are still in the ship's hold, though two were extracted and shown as exhibits. Several items recovered from the Rouse Simmons are housed in Rogers Street Fishing Village Museum in Two Rivers, Wisconsin, including the ship's wheel. The ship's anchor was retrieved and stands at the entrance to the Milwaukee Yacht Club. The wreck is listed on the National Register of Historic Places and lies within the boundaries of the Wisconsin Shipwreck Coast National Marine Sanctuary.

=== Legacy ===
The Christmas Tree Ship lived on through Schuenemann's wife, Barbara, and their two daughters. However, in the latter years they chose to transport the trees by train and merely used a boat as a platform for sale. The practice of transporting trees by schooner ceased in 1920, and the increasing popularity of railways, highways and tree farms soon made it easier and more affordable for everyone to buy a tree.

== See also ==
- The Christmas Schooner - A musical written by Julie Shannon and John Reeger that chronicles the journeys of a fictional schooner based on the Rouse Simmons.
- The Christmas Tree Ship (EP) - An album by iLiKETRAiNS about the Rouse Simmons and three other ships lost in the same storm.
