= The Shallows =

The Shallows may refer to:

- The Shallows (book), a 2010 non-fiction book by Nicholas G. Carr
- The Shallows (film), a 2016 thriller film starring Blake Lively
- The Shallows (album), a 2012 album by I Like Trains
- "The Shallows", a song performed by Dog's Eye View on the 1997 album Daisy
- "The Shallows", a song performed by Bear Hands on the 2016 album You'll Pay for This

== See also ==
- Shallows, a 1984 novel
