= The Adventures of Tom Sawyer (musical) =

- Music: Don Schlitz
- Lyrics: Don Schlitz
- Book: Ken Ludwig
- Basis: The Adventures of Tom Sawyer, novel by Mark Twain
- Productions: 2001 Broadway

The Adventures of Tom Sawyer is a musical comedy based on the 1876 novel by Mark Twain conceived and written by Ken Ludwig, with music and lyrics by Don Schlitz. The musical is the story of a fourteen-year-old boy growing up in the heartland of America. This Broadway musical version of Mark Twain's novel is set in 1840 in St. Petersburg, Missouri, a bustling town on the banks of the Mississippi River. In the course of the story, Tom matches wits with his stern Aunt Polly, falls in love with the beautiful, feisty Becky Thatcher, and goes on the adventure of his life with Becky and Huckleberry Finn. Along the way he meets a terrifying villain named Injun Joe, Tom's bratty half-brother Sid, and all the other boys and girls in the village.

== Productions ==
The Adventures of Tom Sawyer opened on Broadway at the Minskoff Theater on April 26, 2001 and closed on May 13, 2001, after 21 performances and 34 previews. The musical was directed by Scott Ellis with choreography by David Marques, and featured Joshua Park as Tom Sawyer, Kristen Bell as Becky Thatcher, Jim Poulos as Huckleberry Finn, with Linda Purl (Aunt Polly), Tom Aldredge (Muff Potter), Stephen Lee Anderson (Doc Robinson/Pap), Jane Connell (Widow Douglas), John Dossett (Judge Thatcher) and Kevin Durand (Injun Joe).

== Synopsis ==
=== Act One ===
In 1840, Tom Sawyer is fishing outside St. Petersburg, Missouri as his friends arrive, and the children play a game of Robin Hood ("Hey, Tom Sawyer"). Tom's Aunt Polly sends him to school, where he tricks the schoolmaster, Mr. Dobbins, into letting the class have the day off. Aunt Polly, Mr. Dobbins and the preacher, Reverend Sprague, lament that they "can’t do a thing about the boy."

That Saturday, Aunt Polly orders Tom to whitewash a fence in front of their house, and Tom's half-brother, Sid, is happy. Frustrated, Tom plans to run away ("Here's My Plan").

As Tom procrastinates, he meets beautiful newcomer Becky Thatcher, and they are mutually attracted. The town's outcast and Tom's best friend Huckleberry Finn appears and arranges for the two of them to meet at the local graveyard that night so that Huck can "cure his warts." Huck remarks that painting the fence looks like fun, and Tom then swindles his friends into painting the fence for him after having them trade their valuables. ("Smart Like That").

That night, Tom and Huck visit the local graveyard and see Doc Robinson, Muff Potter, and Injun Joe, a "half-breed" troublemaker, robbing a man's grave ("Hands All Clean"). After a scuffle about ownership of the dead man's watch, Joe murders Doc Robinson and frames Muff for it. The boys run away and swear in blood to "keep mum forever" about what they saw ("The Vow").

On the way to church, single parents Aunt Polly and Judge Thatcher lament about "Raising A Child By Yourself." In church, Tom tries to impress Becky by fooling Reverend Sprague into giving him the "Bible Prize" ("It’s In The Bible").

Tom tries to convince a fearful Huck to learn to read. When Huck saves old Widow Douglas from the advances of the town drunk, she offers to teach him to read and to live in her home. However, Huck declines ("It Just Ain’t Me").

That day in school, the girls are gossiping over a book of poetry that Becky found belonging to Mr. Dobbins, the teacher. When Mr. Dobbins enters, the girls panic and drop the book. When Mr. Dobbins is teaching, he discovers the book on the ground and angrily interrogates the students about who took it. When he is about to get Becky to confess, Tom lies and says he took the book. Before Tom can be punished, the Sheriff calls Dobbins away, needing a coroner after discovering Doc Robinson's body. Tom and Becky proclaim their undying love for each other ("To Hear You Say My Name").

Muff Potter is arrested for murder, and he pleads with Injun Joe to save him from hanging. Joe agrees to help, but in return, he wants a map that Muff has found: a map leading to a treasure, Murrell's Gold ("Murrel's Gold"). After Joe leaves and Muff is taken away, Tom expresses his wish to tell everyone what really happened in the graveyard, but Huck says that if he does, they'll both surely be killed by Injun Joe, and Tom would be breaking their vow ("Murrell's Gold (Reprise)").

At Muff Potter's trial, Tom goes through with his plan to testify. He tells the truth and swears that Injun Joe committed the murder. Injun Joe yells "You are dead, boy!", throws a knife at Tom, and runs from the courtroom chased by the Sheriff ("The Testimony").

=== Act Two ===
As school ends for the summer, the children celebrate, but their parents remind them that they have chores and that they "can't just sit and twiddle [their] thumbs" ("Ain’t Life Fine"). Huck tells Tom that Injun Joe has returned, and Tom tells Aunt Polly that he won't be attending the annual town picnic. Aunt Polly tries to convince him to go, and then tells him she'll still love him ("This Time Tomorrow"). After weeks of secret tutoring by Widow Douglas, Huck finally learns how to read and they celebrate ("I Can Read").

At the annual town picnic the festivities start with the exploration of McDougal's Cave. As the town people go to the cave, Injun Joe makes his presence known to Muff, wanting to know where he found the map. After a violent interrogation, Muff reveals to Joe that the map came from the cave. Injun Joe states that he will go into the cave to find Murrell's Gold ("Murrell's Gold (Second Reprise)"). As the children explore the cave, Tom takes Becky to a hidden part of the cave. As they explore, Tom and Becky realize they are lost. Aunt Polly and Judge Thatcher, with the rest of the town people, frantically search for them ("Angels Lost").

Underground, as Tom and Becky seek a way out of the cave, Tom comforts Becky after telling her they are on their last candle ("Light"). Tom uses a reel of kite string to look for a way out while Becky can rest. As Becky prays to God that they will be found ("Angels Lost (Reprise)"), Injun Joe grabs Becky, but Tom jumps out from behind a rock and fights him off until Huck arrives. The three friends all come together to fight Injun Joe, which ends with Tom accidentally stabbing Joe in the chest, leading Joe to stumble into a ravine to his death. The shaken children find Murrell's Gold and see daylight shining through a crack in the wall. They escape from the cave, finally safe.

As the people of St. Petersburg hold a funeral service for the lost children ("Light (Reprise)") Huck, Tom and Becky limp into town. They realize that they're watching their own funeral. The children are discovered and the town people are wild with happiness ("Ain’t Life Fine (Reprise)"). Huck tells Tom that he can read, and the two friends join the celebration ("Finale").

== Character list ==
- Tom Sawyer – 14-year-old, in love with Becky
- Huckleberry Finn – A charming renegade, son of the town drunk and Tom's best friend
- Aunt Polly – Tom's kind but stern aunt
- Becky Thatcher – Tom's girlfriend
- Amy Lawrence – In love with Tom, Tom's former girlfriend
- Injun Joe – The villain
- Mr. Dobbins – The school teacher
- Muff Potter – A local vagrant
- Pap – The town drunk, and Huck's father
- Reverend Sprague
- Sid Sawyer – Tom's half-brother. An insufferable goody-goody tattletale
- Widow Douglas – A kind, old woman who teaches Huck how to read
- Alfred Temple – friend of Tom's
- Benjamin Rogers – Joe Harper's best friend
- Doc Robinson – The man murdered by Injun Joe
- George Bellamy
- Gideon Wain – Muff Potters's lawyer
- Joe Harper – Tom's second best friend, and best friend of Benjamin Rogers
- Judge Thatcher – Becky Thatcher's father, an old judge who just moved to Missouri
- Mayor Lanyard Bellamy
- Suzie Rogers
- Lucy Harper
- Jim Hollis
- Lyle Peters

== Songs ==
Act I

- "Overture: Civilization" – Orchestra
- "Hey, Tom Sawyer" – Tom Sawyer, Aunt Polly, Lemuel Dobbins, Reverend Sprague, and the People of St. Petersburg
- "Here's My Plan" – Tom Sawyer
- "Smart Like That" – Tom Sawyer, Ben Rogers, Huckleberry Finn, and Boys
- "Hands All Clean" – Injun Joe and Doctor Robinson
- "The Vow" – Tom Sawyer and Huckleberry Finn
- "Raising A Child" – Aunt Polly and Judge Thatcher
- "Old Hundred" – Ensemble
- "In The Bible" – Tom Sawyer, Reverend Sprague, and Ensemble
- "It Just Ain't Me" – Huckleberry Finn
- "To Hear You Say My Name" – Tom Sawyer and Becky Thatcher
- "Murrell's Gold" – Injun Joe, Muff Potter, Tom Sawyer, and Huckleberry Finn
- "The Testimony" – Tom Sawyer and Ensemble

Act II

- "Entr'acte" - Orchestra
- "Ain't Life Fine" – Company
- "This Time Tomorrow" – Aunt Polly
- "I Can Read" – Huckleberry Finn and Widow Douglas
- "Murrell's Gold" (Reprise) – Injun Joe
- "Angels Lost" – Aunt Polly, Judge Thatcher, and the People of St. Petersburg
- "Light" – Tom Sawyer
- "Angels Lost" (Reprise) – Becky Thatcher
- "Light" (Reprise) – People of St. Petersburg
- "Finale" – Tom Sawyer, Huckleberry Finn, Becky Thatcher, and Ensemble

== Critical reception ==
The show received mixed reviews. Bruce Weber in The New York Times found the show missed the subversive edge of Mark Twain's narration, limiting its adult appeal, and more seriously also the novel's verve for the "unharnessed exuberance of childhood", leaving a show that felt tame and middle-of-the-road; although it might have enough to hold the attention of some younger audience members. For Charles Isherwood in Variety it was "sunny and handsome but deflatingly bland".

== Awards and nominations ==
Theatre World Award Winner

- 2001 Outstanding New Performer (Joshua Park)

Tony Award Nominees

- Lighting Designer (Kenneth Posner)
- Scenic Designer (Heidi Ettinger)

Drama Desk Award nominees

- Outstanding Orchestrations (Michael Starobin)
- Outstanding Set Design of a Musical (Heidi Ettinger)
- Outstanding Costume Design (Anthony Powell)
- Outstanding Lighting Design (Kenneth Posner)
