= This Skin Full of Bones =

Compilation album by I Like Trains
- Released: 5 December 2011
- Label: I Like Records

I Like Trains chronology
He Who Saw The Deep (2010)	This Skin Full of Bones (2011)	The Shallows (2012)

This Skin Full of Bones is a CD+DVD release by British band I Like Trains. It was released on 5 December 2011. Released at the end of promotional activities for their album He Who Saw The Deep, the CD collects live tracks, b-sides and alternate mixes, while the accompanying DVD contains videos of the live performances as well as the music videos released for songs on the album. The live performances were recorded in the band's home town of Leeds.

== Track listing ==
=== CD ===
1. "A Father's Son" (live at the Left Bank, Leeds)
2. "Sirens" (live at the Left Bank, Leeds)
3. "Hope Is Not Enough" (live at the Left Bank, Leeds)
4. "Progress Is a Snake" (live at the Left Bank, Leeds)
5. "The Spark"
6. "A Kingdom You Deserve"
7. "Flood"
8. "Sirens" (48K mix)
9. "Sirens" (DDR mix)

=== DVD ===
1. "A Father's Son" (live at the Left Bank, Leeds)
2. "Sirens" (live at the Left Bank, Leeds)
3. "Hope Is Not Enough" (live at the Left Bank, Leeds)
4. "Progress Is a Snake" (live at the Left Bank, Leeds)
5. "A Father's Son" (music video)
6. "Sirens" (music video)
7. "Sea of Regrets" (music video)
