= Elegies to Lessons Learnt =

Studio album by I Like Trains
- Released: 1 October 2007
- Genre: Post-rock
- Length: 50:32
- Label: Beggars Banquet
- Producer: I Like Trains

I Like Trains chronology
Progress Reform (2006)	Elegies to Lessons Learnt (2007)	The Christmas Tree Ship (2008)

Elegies to Lessons Learnt is I Like Trains' first studio album, and was released on 1 October 2007.

As with their earlier EP, Progress Reform, many of the songs cover historical events. Each B-Side (indented here) tells a different aspect of the same story as its single.

- "We All Fall Down" is about the plague epidemic of 1665 in Eyam, Derbyshire, which killed 260 people and left only 83 alive.
- "Twenty Five Sins" is about the Great Fire of London in 1666.
- "The Deception" tells of Donald Crowhurst, who attempted to cheat in the Sunday Times Golden Globe Race in 1968–1969, but disappeared from the race, presumed to have become insane and committed suicide.
  - "Joshua" is an instrumental telling the story of Bernard Moitessier, another competitor in the Golden Globe Race, who abandoned the race while in a strong position to win and instead circled the globe one and a half times until he reached Tahiti.
  - "Victress" tells the story of Nigel Tetley, another competitor in the Golden Globe Race, who became the first person to circumnavigate the globe solo non-stop, but then sank 1,200 miles before completing the race.
- "The Voice Of Reason" refers to the attempted assassination of George III by James Hadfield in 1800.
- "Death of an Idealist" is about the British MP John Stonehouse, who faked his own death in 1974 and lived in Australia, to escape his burdening debt, before being found by Interpol.
- "Remnants of an Army" is about William Brydon, the only European survivor of the Massacre of Elphinstone's Army on the retreat from Kabul in 1842.
- "We Go Hunting" is about Samuel Parris, the Puritan Minister in Salem, Massachusetts during the Salem Witch Trials of 1692 and father to one of the afflicted girls.
  - "More Weight" tells story of Giles Corey, a farmer who was crushed to death by stone weights during the Salem Witch Trials, in an attempt to force a plea from him.
- "Come Over" is about Conrad Schumann, a 19-year-old East German soldier who defected by jumping across the Berlin Wall while it was being built in 1961.
- "Spencer Perceval" tells of the only ever assassination of a British Prime Minister, from the point of view of the murderer John Bellingham.
  - "I Am Murdered" is about the same assassination from Spencer Perceval's own point of view. The title consists of Perceval's last words.

"Victress", which was released before this album, alludes to the album title with the lyrics "I sing elegies to lessons I will never learn" which are sung during the second verse.

A DVD version of the album was released on 21 April 2008, and coincided with a tour and the release of "We Go Hunting" as a single.

Professional ratings
Aggregate scores
Source	Rating
Metacritic	70/100
Review scores
Source	Rating
AllMusic	3/5 stars
NME	7/10 stars
Pitchfork Media	6.8/10

== Track listing ==
1. "We All Fall Down" – 6:12
2. "Twenty Five Sins" – 3:39
3. "The Deception" – 3:58
4. "Voice of Reason" – 5:00
5. "Death of an Idealist" – 3:25
6. "Remnants of an Army" – 3:57
7. "We Go Hunting" – 3:24
8. "Come Over" – 4:10
9. "Spencer Perceval" – 9:09
10. "Epiphany" – 2:18
11. "Death is the End" – 5:21

== Singles ==
"We Go Hunting", released 21 April 2008

7" Vinyl

1. "We Go Hunting" – 3:24
2. "More Weight" – 4:04

"The Deception", released 10 September 2007

CD

1. "The Deception" – 3:59
2. "Joshua" – 4:43
3. "Victress" – 4:09

7" Vinyl

1. "The Deception" – 3:59
2. "Victress" – 4:09

"Spencer Perceval", released 26 March 2007

CD

1. "Spencer Perceval" – 9:14
2. "I Am Murdered" – 6:07

12" Vinyl

1. "Spencer Perceval" – 9:14
2. "I Am Murdered" – 6:07

== Personnel ==
- David Martin – guitar and vocals
- Guy Bannister – guitar, keyboards, vocals
- Alistair Bowis – bass
- Simon Fogal – drums
- Ashley Dean - Cornet
