= He Who Saw The Deep =

Studio album by I Like Trains
- Released: 25 October 2010
- Genre: Post-rock
- Length: 49:59
- Label: Cargo Records
- Producer: I Like Trains

I Like Trains chronology
The Christmas Tree Ship (2008)	He Who Saw The Deep (2010)	This Skin Full of Bones (2011)

He Who Saw The Deep is the second album by Leeds band I Like Trains. It was released on 4 October 2010.

Having left Beggars Banquet Records when it went bust in 2008, the group had no record label to distribute the album. Following the writing and recording of the album, the band started a Pledgemusic project in July 2010 to get fan funding in order to master the album, promote it and tour it. They offered various exclusives to backers who pledged certain amounts. They succeeded in surpassing their target funding and released the album on their own label ILR.

It received generally positive reviews, with The Line of Best Fit describing it as "a tender collection of songs that rely on passion rather than sentiment". Many reviewers noted a change in musical style, with musicOMH noting the lyrics were "now looking to the future" compared to their previous songs focused on historical people or events. The Quietus credited the reduced size of the band's line-up for the clearer melodies, less "swathes of reverb", faster tempo and more forward vocals.

== Track list ==
1. "When We Were Kings"
2. "A Father’s Son"
3. "We Saw the Deep"
4. "Hope is not Enough"
5. "Progress is a Snake"
6. "These Feet of Clay"
7. "Sirens"
8. "Sea of Regrets"
9. "These Broken Bones"
10. "A Divorce Before Marriage"
11. "Doves"

== Personnel ==
- Everton Nelson (tracks: 8), Warren Zielinski (tracks: 3, 6, 9, 10) – violin
- Ian Burdge (tracks: 3, 6, 8, 9, 10) – cello
- Daniel Skevington – engineer
- Helen Oates, Sarah Martin, Siva Sabaratnam – executive producers
- Simon Davey – mastering
- Daniel Skevington, I Like Trains – mixing
