= A Divorce Before Marriage =

Soundtrack album by I Like Trains
- Released: 2 December 2016
- Length: 64:35
- Label: I Like Records

I Like Trains chronology
Beacons (2012)	A Divorce Before Marriage (2016)

A Divorce Before Marriage is an album by the band I Like Trains. Released on 2 December 2016, the album is the soundtrack for the film A Divorce Before Marriage, a documentary about the band by Matt Hopkins and Ben Lankester.

== Track listing ==
1. "Bethesda" - 7:59
2. "Tennyson" - 4:48
3. "Wharfe" - 4:10
4. "Elbe" - 2:43
5. "X" - 9:44
6. "North" - 7:11
7. "A Misspent Youth" - 4:10
8. "Lock 19" - 4:06
9. "Aire" - 5:36
10. "Ilkley Moor" - 10:56
11. "Severn Bridge" - 3:12
