= A Christmas Memory (musical) =

Musical play based on the short story by Truman Capote

- Music: Larry Grossman
- Lyrics: Carol Hall
- Book: Duane Poole
- Productions: 2010 Palo Alto; 2014 Off-Broadway

A Christmas Memory is a musical based on the short story of the same name by Truman Capote, with a book by Duane Poole, lyrics by Carol Hall, and music by Larry Grossman. The show premiered in 2010 at the TheatreWorks Silicon Valley in Palo Alto. It premiered Off-Broadway in 2014 at the Irish Repertory Theatre.

== Productions ==
=== World premiere ===
The show opened in 2010 at the TheatreWorks Silicon Valley in Palo Alto. The show was directed by Robert Kelley, sound design Cliff Caruthers, dialect coach Kimily Conkle, lighting design Steven B. Mannschardt, set design Joe Ragey, costume design Allison Connors, musical director William Liberatore, and orchestrator Steve Orich. The cast included Eileen Barnett (Jennie Faulk), Maggie Brown (Nelle Harper), Jennifer Chapman (Nelle Harper), Richard Farrell (Seabon/HaHa/Farley), Penny Fuller (Sook), Peter Heintz (Young Buddy), Gabriel Hoffman (Buddy), Joshua Park (Adult Buddy), and Cathleen Riddley (Anna Stabler).

=== Chicago premiere ===
The show opened in 2014 at the Theatre at the Center in Munster, Indiana. The show was directed by William Pullinsi, musical director William Underwood, set design Angela Weber Miller, choreographer Allyson Graves, projection design Guy Rhodes, lighting design Shelley Strasser-Holland, costume design Brenda Winstead, sound design Barry G. Funderburg, hair & wig design Kevin Barthel, and properties Cassie Schillo. The cast starred Paula Scrofano (Sook), Luke Michael Klein (Young Buddy), Geoff Rice (Adult Buddy), John Reeger (Seabon Faulk, HaHa Jones, Farley Wood), Iris Lieberman (Jennie Faulk), Robin K. Dasilva (Anna Stabler), and Madison Hertel (Nelle Harper).

=== Off-Broadway premiere ===
It premiered Off-Broadway in 2014 at the Irish Repertory Theatre. The show was directed by Charlotte Moore, music director Micah Young, associate music director John DiPinto, choreography Barry McNabb, orchestrator Steve Orich, Set design James Noone, costume design David Toser, lighting design Brian Nason, properties Deirdre Brennan, and wigs Robert Charles Vallance. The cast included Virginia A. Woodruff (Anna Stabler), Ashley Robinson (Adult Buddy), Nancy Hess (Jennie Faulk), Alice Ripley (Sook Faulk), Samuel Cohen (Seabon Faulk), Silvano Spagnuolo (Young Buddy Faulk), and Taylor Richardson (Nelle Harper).
