= Progress Reform =

EP by I Like Trains
- Released: 26 June 2006
- Recorded: During 2005–2006
- Genre: Post-Rock
- Length: 32:14
- Label: Fierce Panda
- Producer: I Like Trains; Dan Austin

I Like Trains chronology
Progress Reform (2006)	Elegies to Lessons Learnt (2007)

Professional ratings
Review scores
Source	Rating
Allmusic	link
Okayplayer	link

Progress Reform is an EP by the Leeds-based post-rock group I Like Trains. The EP's title is a reference to the lyrics of "The Beeching Report", which are concerned with the 1960s Beeching Axe British railway reforms. Other songs on the EP have other historical implications.

- "Terra Nova" – Robert Scott's doomed mission to the South Pole in 1912.
- "No Military Parade" – Roald Amundsen and the events after the polar expedition.
- "A Rook House for Bobby" – tells the story of Bobby Fischer's 1992 chess match against Boris Spassky in Yugoslavia, after which Fischer was unable to return to the USA. The song's video includes a high-speed animation of the final game, with which Fischer won the match.
- "The Beeching Report" – the effects of Dr Richard Beeching's report.

== Track listing ==
1. "Terra Nova" – 4:59
2. "No Military Parade" – 3:27
3. "A Rook House For Bobby" – 4:43
4. "Citizen" – 3:02
5. "The Accident" – 3:02
6. "Stainless Steel" – 8:19
7. "The Beeching Report" – 4:42
8. "Before the Curtains Close" – 5:32 (American version only, which also includes the "Terra Nova" video)

=== Typography ===
The titles of the songs on the CD case employ the same capitalisation format as the band's name, capitalising all letters except for i's. Versions for digital download and streaming do not typically follow this practice.

== Personnel ==
- David Martin: vocals and guitar
- Guy Bannister: guitars and keys
- Alistair Bowis: bass
- Ashley Dean: images and cornet
- Simon Fogal: drums and percussion

== Credits ==
- All music written and performed by I Like Trains
- All songs produced and mixed by I Like Trains
- All songs engineered by Daniel Skevington
- Except "Terra Nova" produced and mixed by I Like Trains and Dan Austin for 140 dB
- "No Military Parade" recorded by Nathanial Chan
- Drums on "The Accident" recorded by Dan Austin
- All songs recorded at the Wortley Studio and the I Like Trains Cellar using the Rumpus Room mobile recording facility except "Terra Nova" recorded at the Miloco Neve Room.

Note: Since this "EP" runs for over 30 minutes, it is technically an album.
