= Larry Grossman (composer) =

American composer (born 1938)

Larry Grossman (born September 3, 1938) is an American composer of stage and screen.

== Early life ==
A Chicago native, Grossman graduated from Northwestern University School Communication in 1960.

== Career ==
He started working in New York City as a vocal coach and accompanist. One of his songs was used in the revue No Shoestrings (1962).

Grossman began working with lyricist Hal Hackady in 1968, and their first piece together was the title song for the play Play It Again, Sam. The pair collaborated on the Broadway musicals Minnie's Boys (1970) and Goodtime Charley (1975). Grossman composed Snoopy: The Musical with Hackady in 1975, which has since been performed in six languages worldwide with the first London production receiving an Olivier award nomination.

Grossman collaborated with theatre legend Harold Prince on Broadway productions of A Doll's Life (1982) and Grind (1985), for which he received Tony nominations.

He adapted the 1973 film Paper Moon, itself based on a 1971 novel, into a musical of the same name, which premiered at the Paper Mill Playhouse in 1993. A revised version was staged at the Goodspeed Opera House, the Walnut Street Theatre, and then Ford's Theatre in Washington, DC. Paper Moon then had two successful tours in Japan.

In 2008, Off-Broadway's York Theatre Company produced a retrospective of his Broadway work, remounting Minnie's Boys, Grind, Goodtime Charley, and "Compose Yourself," new revue of his music.

In 2010, Grossman composed A Christmas Memory with lyrics by Carol Hall and the book by Duane Poole, based on the Truman Capote short story. The show was nominated for an Outer Critics Circle Award for Best Off-Broadway Musical and has been performed nationally.

Grossman's most recent show is Scrooge in Love! which was presented in 2015 by 42nd Street Moon. The first production received four San Francisco Bay Area Critics Circle awards including Best Score. It was honored with a new production in 2016.

Film work includes the song score for The Walt Disney Company's Pocahontas II: Journey to a New World, The Great Mouse Detective and The Princess Diaries 2 and MGM's That's Dancing!. Dramatic film scores include Kurt Vonnegut's Displaced Person and the remake of Hitchcock's Suspicion, both for American Playhouse.

Grossman co-wrote the Michael Jackson song "Gone Too Soon" with Buz Kohan for Jackson's multi-platinum album Dangerous which sold 32 million copies worldwide. They also co-wrote the Christmas classic "Peace on Earth/Little Drummer Boy" for David Bowie and Bing Crosby, performed on Crosby's Christmas Special.

Grossman's Emmy Award-winning television work includes nearly 100 musical specials, concerts and cabaret for artists including Julie Andrews, Shirley MacLaine Liza Minnelli & Goldie Hawn, Andy Williams, Steve Lawrence & Eydie Gormé, Joel Grey, Glen Campbell, Sandy Duncan and Ann-Margret.

He has written music for four Academy Awards telecasts, three Emmy telecasts, two Tony telecasts The Songwriters Hall of Fame and Liberty Weekend produced by David Wolper.

Grossman served as music consultant and composer for The Muppet Show (three seasons), Make Way For Noddy (five years), Christmas in Washington (32 years) and A Capitol Fourth (12 years).

For his work in television, Grossman has been awarded six Emmy's, with a total of 17 nominations, as well as a Peabody Award for his contributions to The Muppet Show.

More recently, Grossman served as music supervisor and composer for Julie's Greenroom, the 2017 Netflix original children's series starring Julie Andrews and The Muppets. He also served as a co-producer on The World According to Snoopy, the re-imagined production of Snoopy!!! The Musical, which also premiered in 2017.

== Productions ==
- Play it Again, Sam (1969)
- Minnie's Boys (1970)
- Goodtime Charley (1975)
- Snoopy! The Musical (1975)
- A Doll's Life (1982) Nominated for a Tony Award and Drama Desk Award
- Ann Reinking...Music Loves Me (1984)
- Diamonds (1984)
- Grind (1985) Nominated for a Tony Award and Drama Desk Award
- The Muppets Celebrate Jim Henson (1990)
- Paper Moon (1993)
- The Gay Century Songbook (2000)
- Tom Jones (2001)
- It Must Be Him (2010)
- A Christmas Memory (2010)
- Scrooge in Love (2015)
