= Joshua Park =

American actor (1976–2015)

Joshua Park (November 26, 1976 – August 30, 2015) was an American theater and screen actor, known for his Broadway debut as the title character of Tom Sawyer in the 2001 musical comedy, The Adventures of Tom Sawyer. He died following a brief illness with pancreatic cancer on August 30, 2015, at the age of 38. He was surrounded by his mother, Beverly Miller, a sister, and other relatives and friends in his native Marshville, North Carolina.

== Early life ==
Park was born in Union County, North Carolina, in 1976. He graduated from the University of North Carolina School of the Arts and then moved to New York City in the early 2000s to pursue a career in acting and theater.

== Theatre ==
In 2001, Park, who was 23-years-old at the time, was cast as Tom Sawyer, the lead character in Broadway's The Adventures of Tom Sawyer, a theatrical adaptation of Mark Twain's novel. The original Broadway production also starred Kristen Bell, Linda Purl, Jim Poulos and Kevin Durand. The short-lived show ran for just 21 performances, opening on April 26, 2001 before closing on May 13, 2001. However, Park's performance earned him the Theatre World Award for outstanding Broadway debut in 2001.

Park collaborated with the Irish Repertory Theatre, an Off Broadway theater company, following the closure of The Adventures of Tom Sawyer. He starred in the Irish Repertory Theatre's original production, The Streets of New York, in late 2001 and the theater's December 2001 holiday show, A Celtic Christmas. The York Theatre, another Off Broadway theater, also cast Park in the U.S. debut of the Australian musical, Prodigal, in 2002. Park co-starred in the York Theatre production with Christian Borle, Kerry Butler and Alison Fraser, and appeared on Prodigal's original cast album.

== Film and television ==
Park transitioned to television and film roles during the mid-2000s, but continued to work in theater. He played the title role of Pippin in the Goodspeed Opera House's production of Pippin in 2006, co-starring alongside Micky Dolenz as Charlemagne. Park also appeared in A Christmas Memory, a musical based on a short story by Truman Capote, during the show's world premiere at the TheatreWorks in Palo Alto, California, in 2010.

== Death ==
On August 30, 2015, Joshua died after a short battle with pancreatic cancer. His family set up the Yury Belov Scholarship Fund and asked for donations to be sent to the fund writing "Yury Belov Scholarship in memory of Joshua Park" on the memo line.
