= The Christmas Schooner =

Musical

- Music: Julie Shannon
- Lyrics: Julie Shannon
- Book: John Reeger
- Basis: True story
- Productions: 1996 Chicago
- Awards: Chicago After Dark Award

The Christmas Schooner is a musical written by John Reeger with music and lyrics by Julie Shannon.

Premiered at Bailiwick Repertory Theatre and received the 1996 Chicago After Dark Award for outstanding new work. A twelve-year continuing seasonal run has followed as well as a CD, and productions in the Midwest, Texas and California have also been successful. 2008 was the final season for the performance at the Bailiwick Repertory Theatre.

Based on the true story of the Rouse Simmons, a Great Lakes schooner whose captain risks life and limb to transport fir trees from Michigan's Upper Peninsula to Chicago's German immigrants during the late 19th century. Notable songs from the musical include "We All Have Songs," "Pass it On," "What is it About the Water?," "The Christmas Schooner," "Questions," and "Hardwater Sailor."

== Performances ==
The professional World Premiere of “The Christmas Schooner” debuted at the Bailiwick Repertory Theatre in the Winter of 1995. Directed by David Zak with the following actors in the main roles: David G. Peryam as Peter Stossel, Candace L. Johnson as Alma Stossel, Roscoe Fraser as Gus, Anthony Cotton as Karl (age 9), Cecily Strong as Mary Claire and Becca Daniels as Cousin Martha. Other actors featured throughout the annual run of Christmas Schooner include: Amy Arbizzani (Martha, Alma), Tom Higgins (Gus), Ben Stoner (Steve), Jesse Kazemek (Oskar), Brendon Martin (Young Karl), Hilary Feldman (Enid), Gretchen Goodrich (Cousin Martha), David Vish (Oskar), JB Ward (Olive), Tom Shea (Rudy), Paul Mullen (Hans), Jendi Tarde (Enid), and Kevin Pease (Older Karl).

A 2011 revival at the Mercury Theater Chicago began previews on November 16, 2011 and opened on November 19, 2011. It was directed by L. Walter Stearns, executive director of Mercury Theater Chicago, with musical direction by Eugene Dizon and choreography by Brenda Didier. The cast included Cory Goodrich (Alma), Karl Sean Hamilton (Peter), Jim Sherman (Gus), Daniel Coonley (Karl, age 9), Mark Kosten (Karl, age 15), Elizabeth Haley (Martha), Kelly Anne Clark (Caitlin), Dina DiCostanzo (Olive/Rose), John Finley (Louis), Ronald Keaton (Oskar), Caroline Kobylarz (Enid), Benjamin Magnuson (Steve), Isabelle Roberts (Mary Claire), Thomas M. Shea (Rudy), Catherine Stegemann (Lilli Mae), and Ryan Westwood (Hans/Officer Wells). This production was nominated for Outstanding Production - Musical - Midsize by Chicago's Jeff Awards.

Chris Jones of the Chicago Tribune said, "So when I say that the newest production of the "Schooner" at the reborn Mercury Theater is by far the best sung of that dozen I've seen, that's pretty much the whole deal. You may well have seen "Schooner" before, but you won't have heard it sung (or seen it acted) at this level. Critic's Choice." Mary Houlihan of the Chicago Sun-Times said, "L. Walter Stearns has given the musical new life in a production that pleases in every way. With this heartwarming production, "The Christmas Schooner" rejoins the ranks of holiday favorites."

== Musical Numbers ==
Act I

- "We All Have Songs" - Company
- "That's America" - Alma, Gustav, & Karl
- "The Mummers Are Here" - Rudy, Oskar, Steve, & Peter
- "The Blessings of the Branch" - Company
- "The Letter" - Peter, Martha, & Company
- "The Letter (Reprise)" - Company
- "Another Season on the Water" - Company
- "When I Look At You" - Peter
- "What Is It About the Water?" - Company
- "The Christmas Schooner" - Peter, Gustav, Steve, Oskar, Rudy, & Company

Act II

- "Song of the Hungry Peasants" - Company
- "Winterfest Polka" - Oskar, Rudy, & Company
- "Loving Sons" - Alma & Karl
- "The Strudel Waltz" - Peter & Alma
- "Another Season on the Water (Reprise)" - Company
- "Hardwater Sailors" - Karl age 15, Steve, Oskar, Rudy, Hans, & Company
- "Questions" - Alma
- "When I Look At You (Reprise)" - Gustav & Alma
- "What Is It About the Water? (Reprise)" - Karl age 15 & Company
- "The Blessings of the Branch (Finale)" - Alma & Mary Claire
- "We All Have Songs (Bows)" - Company

== Awards ==
- Winner of Chicago's 1996 "After Dark" Award for Outstanding New Work.
- Winner of Chicago's 1996 "After Dark" Award for Outstanding Performance: Candace L. Johnson as Alma Stossel
- Named a 1996 "Editor's Choice" by American Theatre Magazine.
- Received positive accolades from 2004 Cappies program.
- Nominated for Outstanding Production - Musical - Midsize (2012) by Jeff Awards.
