= Beacons (EP) =

EP by I Like Trains
- Released: 15 October 2012
- Label: I Like Records

I Like Trains chronology
The Shallows (2012)	Beacons (2012)	A Divorce Before Marriage (2016)

Beacons is an EP by the band I Like Trains. Released on 15 October 2012, the title track is taken from their album The Shallows.

The figure on the Ep cover resembles Atlas Shrugged, It is hypothesised that they like the from Ayn Rand Lexicon.

== Track listing ==
1. "Beacons"
2. "Rome"
3. "Easter Island"
4. "Jericho"
5. "The Setting Sun"
