= Snoopy! The Musical =

1975 musical

Snoopy!
- The Musical
- Showbill cover of the original Off-Broadway production
- Music: Larry Grossman
- Lyrics: Hal Hackady
- Book: Warren Lockhart; Arthur Whitelaw; Michael Grace
- Basis: Charles M. Schulz's comic strip Peanuts
- Productions: 1975 San Francisco; 1982 Off-Broadway; 1983 West End; 2003 West End revival

Snoopy: The Musical is a 1975 American musical comedy with music by Larry Grossman, lyrics by Hal Hackady, and a book by Warren Lockhart, Arthur Whitelaw, and Michael Grace. The characters are from the Charles M. Schulz comic strip Peanuts. This sequel to the musical You're a Good Man, Charlie Brown focuses more on the life of Snoopy. Since its premiere, the musical has been a popular choice for regional, international, and amateur theatre performances.

== Productions ==
=== Original San Francisco ===
Snoopy: The Musical premiered on December 9, 1975 at the Little Fox Theatre in San Francisco, California. Directed by Arthur Whitelaw, featured Don Potter as the title role. The costume design is by David Graden, with lighting by Ken Billington, orchestrations and vocals by Laurence J. Blank, produced by John Anderson, and choreography by Marc Breaux. The show opened to mixed reviews, not quite as critically acclaimed as You're a Good Man, Charlie Brown. The show closed on July 5, 1976.

=== New York ===
The musical was produced Off-Broadway at the Lamb's Theatre opening December 20, 1982. Directed by Whitelaw, with David Garrison as Snoopy. The show performed 152 performances until it closed on May 1, 1983. The crew included Paul D. Hughes, Martin Markinson, Gene Persson, and Donald Tick as producers, Ronald Melrose as musical director, Marc Breaux returning as choreographer, David Graden returning as costume and set design, Ken Billington returning as lighting designer, James Walsh as general manager, Richard Humleker and C. George Willard as press representatives, and Melissa Davis as production manager. The Off-Broadway received similar reviews to the San Francisco production. Later, when Lorna Luft replaced Peppermint Patty, a new song was written for her, entitled "Hurry Up, Face". This song was used in later productions, including the West End.

A benefit concert presentation of Snoopy! was held at the Peter Norton Symphony Space in Manhattan, New York City, on April 12, 2004. Directed by Ben Rimalower, with Christian Borle starring in the title role, with Broadway star Sutton Foster as Peppermint Patty.

=== Toronto ===
The musical was first produced legitimately in Canada by the Toronto Civic Light Opera Company in January 1983. Directed by Joe Cascone, the cast starred Brad Donovan as the title role. The company revived the show in 1995 with Cascone now playing the title role.

=== London ===
The musical first opened previews September 16, 1983. The musical ran at the West End Duchess Theatre, opening September 20, 1983 and starred Teddy Kempner as Snoopy. The show closed on November 11, 1984, after 479 performances. Snoopy!!! was critically acclaimed, and was a success, leading to a revival in 2003.

Snoopy was revived at the West End Jermyn Street Theatre in February 2003 for 14 performances. It was directed by Joseph Pitcher and featured Stephen Carlile as Snoopy and Neil Gordon-Taylor as Charlie Brown. The musical ran at the New Players Theatre in London, in July 2004, with several cast members from the Jermyn Street production and again directed by Whitelaw, the original director. Robin Armstrong replaced Snoopy, and Stephen Kynman replaced Charlie Brown.

=== Brisbane, Australia ===
The musical played at The Queensland Performing Arts Center in The Cremorne Theatre, Brisbane (The Queensland Theatre Company) from October through December 1986. It then transferred to The Gold Coast in January 1987. Directed by Greg Gesch, starring Jack Webster as Snoopy, Patrick Phillips as Charlie Brown and Zoe Bertram as Lucy.

=== San Marcos, Texas ===
A revised version, under the name The World According to Snoopy came to Texas State University from February 14–19, 2017. The musical was directed by Kaitlin Hopkins and starred a cast of students. Grossman was directly involved with this production: besides revising the book and adding or removing songs, Grossman collaborated with Andrew Lippa (who had previously contributed new music to the 1999 Broadway revival of You're a Good Man, Charlie Brown) on the new song "Husband Material".

=== Cape Town, South Africa ===
The musical ran at the Artscape Arena in Cape Town, South Africa in February 2018, starring Jaydon Farao in the title role of Snoopy. The musical was produced by G&S, directed by Darryl Spijkers, musical direction by Kathy Lin, Set Design by Waldo Buckle and Zain Cassiem and Costume Design by David Pamplin.

== Synopsis ==
The show is a "series of self-contained vignettes".

Act I

As the curtain rises, each character enters and finds Snoopy atop his doghouse, and they all describe "The World According To Snoopy". Later, Lucy and Charlie Brown have a brief discussion of why he has chosen Snoopy for a pet ("Snoopy's Song"), which almost leads to Lucy getting Charlie Brown to buy a new pet. Snoopy, hoping to please his owner, decides to try to follow Charlie Brown's directions better. Meanwhile, Woodstock begins his day ("Woodstock's Theme"), but to his dismay, he seems to have fallen in love with a worm. Peppermint Patty has similar problems with love, wishing that she could be prettier to impress Charlie Brown ("Hurry Up, Face").

In school, the group hopes that the teacher will not call on them to answer a question about the famous poet Edgar Allan Poe. The girls are having trouble, while the boys are confident ("Edgar Allan Poe"). Linus says everything correct, with Charlie Brown saying the opposite. On Mother's Day, Snoopy reflects on how much he misses his lost mother ("Mother's Day"). Meanwhile, Sally, Peppermint Patty, and Lucy have a happy discussion on what they've learned in their lives ("I Know Now").

On Halloween, Linus, along with a reluctant Snoopy, awaits the arrival of the Great Pumpkin in the pumpkin patch ("The Vigil"). To his dismay, the great pumpkin never arrives, like every year. The next morning, the group looks up at the clouds where they imagine Mount Rushmore, dragons and twenty milk-white horses ("Clouds"), but when asked what he sees, Charlie Brown can only sadly say, "A horsie and a duckie."

Snoopy enters as the Easter Beagle to hand out bright Easter eggs to everyone, except Charlie Brown. A dejected Charlie Brown, musing on the new independence of his pet, is left alone ("Where Did That Little Dog Go?"). Similar events progress, and Lucy, Peppermint Patty, and Sally try to sell Snoopy for less than a dime ("Dime a Dozen"), though Snoopy is quick to realize that he must mend his ways and wishes that he could start over ("Daisy Hill").

Life soon goes back to normal and the gang seems to have forgotten those events. They are however, beginning to think, as Lucy says, that they live "in the most boring place in the whole stupid world!", all of them asking the same question, if anything good will happen. They decide to organize a party, but Snoopy isn't allowed. Snoopy decides he will have his own party and still will have a fun time ("When Do the Good Things Start?")

Act II

The show reopens with the whole gang thinking about how friends help each other all the time ("Friend"). Unfortunately, Playbeagle (a play on Playboy) has decided not to publish Snoopy's manuscript, but Snoopy's spirits remain undaunted even amid the throes of rejection, as he begins his new story ("The Great Writer"). The story is only a spoof off classic movies, and is rejected by the writers. Later, Peppermint Patty expresses her love for Charlie Brown ("Poor Sweet Baby"), but soon says that "it'll never happen" out of embarrassment. Sally asks Linus if he can go to the movies, but he rejects. However, Sally is still confident that one day Linus will marry her ("Husband Material")

Sally, seeing leaves fall from a tree, remarks that there is something to learn from the cycle of life ("Don't Be Anything Less Than Everything You Can Be"). While sitting atop his doghouse, Snoopy receives a letter delivered by Woodstock: he has become Head Beagle. Snoopy celebrates his success happily, ready for anything ("The Big Bow-Wow").

Later, the gang begins a discussion of Christmas and innocence. Then, looking up at the starry sky, Charlie Brown remarks "I think that there must be a tiny star out there that is my star." They reflect on their friendships and realize that if one person changes their world, they might as well be friends forever ("Just One Person"). Linus remarks to Charlie Brown, "Well, as Lucy always says, he isn't much of a dog." Snoopy replies, "But, after all, who is?" After the show, a bow is sung with a reprise of "Don't Be Anything Less Than Everything You Can Be".

== Musical numbers ==
Act I

- "Overture" - Orchestra (different music in West End production)
- "The World According to Snoopy" - Company
- "Snoopy's Song" - Snoopy and Company††
- "Woodstock's Theme" - Orchestra
- "Hurry Up, Face" - Peppermint Patty(†)
- "Edgar Allan Poe" - Peppermint Patty, Lucy, Sally, Linus, and Charlie Brown
- "Mother's Day" - Snoopy†
- "I Know Now" - Sally, Peppermint Patty, and Lucy
- "The Vigil" - Linus
- "Clouds" - Company
- "Where Did That Little Dog Go?" - Charlie Brown
- "Dime a Dozen" - Lucy, Snoopy, Peppermint Patty, and Sally†
- "Daisy Hill" - Snoopy
- "When Do The Good Things Start?" - Company†

Act II

- "Entr'acte" - Orchestra† (original "Overture" music in West End production)
- "Friend" - Company‡
- "The Great Writer" - Snoopy
- "Poor Sweet Baby" - Peppermint Patty
- "Husband Material" - Sally⹋
- "Don't Be Anything Less Than Everything You Can Be" - Sally, Linus, Peppermint Patty, and Charlie Brown
- "The Big Bow-Wow" - Snoopy
- "Just One Person" - Snoopy and Company
- "Don't Be Anything Less Than Everything You Can Be" (reprise) - Company†

† Added for the West End production and later
††Not included in the original cast recording
(†) Added for the Off-Broadway production
‡ Act one finale from 1975 to 1982; Not included in any productions from 1982 to 2017
⹋ Added for the San Marcos production; Music by Larry Grossman and lyrics by Andrew Lippa

Grossman composed an additional song, "Eight Little Notes", to have been sung as an anthem to Ludwig van Beethoven by Schroeder. Though Schroeder was cut from the musical, the song was later sung by Rowlf the Dog in an episode of The Muppet Show, where Grossman worked as a music consultant.

== Major production casts ==
Character	San Francisco (1975)	Off-Broadway (1982)	West End (1983)	West End revival (2003)
Snoopy	Don Potter	David Garrison	Teddy Kempner	Stephen Carlile
Charlie Brown	James Gleason	Terry Kerwin	Robert Locke	Neil Gordon-Taylor
Lucy van Pelt	Janell Pulis	Kay Cole	Zoë Bright	Sarah Lark
Linus van Pelt	Jimmy Dodge	Stephen Fenning	Mark Hadfield	Stuart Piper
Sally Brown	Randi Kallan	Deborah Graham	Susie Blake	Clare Louise Connolly
Peppermint Patty	Pamela Myers	Vicki Lewis	Nicky Croydon	Kellie Ryan
Woodstock	Cathy Cahn	Cathy Cahn	Anthony Best	Alex Woodhall

=== Notable cast replacements ===
Off-Broadway

- Snoopy - Jason Graae
- Peppermint Patty - Lorna Luft

== Recordings ==
Around 1976, the original cast album was released with all songs from the original production. The musical was re-released on CD in 1991, while on digital in 2000, with a strange glitch making all the songs in caps lock.

Snoopy!!! The Musical: Original Cast Recording

Soundtrack album cast recording by Original Cast of Snoopy!!!
- Released: 1976
- Recorded: September 7, 1975
- Studio: Wally Heider Studios, San Francisco
- Genre: Show tune; musical comedy
- Length: 41:09
- Label: DRG Records
- Producer: Larry Grossman and Jim Ed Norman

All tracks are written and composed by Larry Grossman and Hal Hackady.

No.	Title	Length
1.	"Overture" / "The World According to Snoopy"	2:03
2.	"Woodstock's Theme"	0:49
3.	"Edgar Allan Poe"	2:39
4.	"I Know Now"	2:30
5.	"The Vigil"	3:21
6.	"Clouds"	2:55
7.	"Where Did That Little Dog Go?"	2:31
8.	"Daisy Hill"	2:49
9.	"Friend"	3:48
10.	"The Great Writer"	6:04
11.	"Poor Sweet Baby"	3:05
12.	"Don't Be Anything Less Than Everything You Can Be"	2:55
13.	"The Big Bow-Wow"	2:57
14.	"Just One Person"	2:43
Total length:		41:09

Snoopy!!! The Musical: Original London Cast Recording

Soundtrack album cast recording by Original London Cast of Snoopy!!!
- Released: 1983
- Recorded: September 12, 1983
- Studio: Abbey Road Studios, London
- Genre: Show tune; musical comedy
- Length: 57:02
- Label: That's Entertainment Records
- Producer: Norman Newell

In 1983, the original West End original cast album was released. In 1998, it was released on CD, and in 2004, it was released on digital. The cast recording had the new songs for the West End production, including "Hurry Up, Face" from the 1982 Off-Broadway production. All tracks are written and composed by Larry Grossman and Hal Hackady. In 2018, in the collection Broadway to West End highlights from the original cast album were released, excluding "Overture", "Woodstock's Theme", "Hurry Up, Face", "Mother's Day", "The Vigil", "Dime a Dozen", "When Do the Good Things Start?", "Entr'acte", and "Don't Be Anything Less Than Everything You Can Be" (reprise).

No.	Title	Length
1.	"Overture"	3:08
2.	"The World According to Snoopy"	1:41
3.	"Snoopy's Song"	2:20
4.	"Woodstock's Theme"	0:35
5.	"Hurry Up, Face"	2:17
6.	"Edgar Allan Poe"	2:50
7.	"Mother's Day"	3:36
8.	"I Know Now"	3:07
9.	"The Vigil"	3:35
10.	"Clouds"	2:54
11.	"Where Did That Little Dog Go?"	2:33
12.	"Dime a Dozen"	2:03
13.	"Daisy Hill"	3:17
14.	"When Do the Good Things Start?"	3:54
15.	"Entr'acte"	1:51
16.	"The Great Writer"	6:04
17.	"Poor Sweet Baby"	3:20
18.	"Don't Be Anything Less Than Everything You Can Be"	2:47
19.	"The Big Bow-Wow"	3:25
20.	"Just One Person" / "Don't Be Anything Less Than Everything You Can Be Reprise"	3:36
Total length:		57:02

== Response ==
Reviewing the Off-Broadway production during its Boston tryout, Carolyn Clay of The Boston Phoenix said that the show "is small and cute and very eager; there is just more whimsy than meat on this pup's bones." Clay was particularly miffed at the lead character's attenuated appearances: "rather than hoof himself dog-tired in the service of art, [Snoopy] grants his presence judiciously, particularly in the show's wearyingly jejune first act — the low point of which comes when Snoopy’s canary chum Woodstock, played by Cathy Cahn, turns out to be a mime (perhaps the cat has her tongue)."

In his review of the 1982 Lamb's Theatre production, Mel Gussow wrote: "If the musical [Snoopy!!!] were nose-to-nose with Mr. (David) Garrison's performance, it would be a subject for celebration. Sadly, this sequel ...is a hand-me-down...the show meanders all over play-school country. The book, which is credited to three individual writers as well as a task force called 'Charles M. Schulz Creative Associates' is a pastepot of Peanuts dialogue that wanders into various other neighborhoods in order to accommodate the score."

In the 1983 West End production The Guardian reviewed "The astringency of the jokes is belied by Hal Hackady's lyrics which place great stress on the American success ethic... This innocent-looking revue certainly makes its point that the child is father of the wisecracking man; but I still can't help feeling that brevity is the soul of strip".

In reviewing the 2004 London production, the Whats On Stage reviewer noted "...this is a show for all ages and all seasons - and as a sunny summer's entertainment, could hardly be bettered. The musical retains the fast, sharp comic appeal and instantly recognisable characterisations of the line-drawing originals, but also irresistibly brings it to human form by buoying up its snapshot scenes with the tuneful ease of the light, bright melodies of composer Larry Grossman's settings to Hal Hackaday's apt, witty lyrics."
