= The Christmas Tree Ship (EP) =

EP by I Like Trains
- Released: 24 November 2008
- Genre: Post-Rock
- Length: 22:10
- Label: Beggars Banquet
- Producer: I Like Trains

I Like Trains chronology
Elegies to Lessons Learnt (2007)	The Christmas Tree Ship (2008)	He Who Saw The Deep (2010)

The Christmas Tree Ship is the second EP by I Like Trains. It was released on 24 November 2008.

It is an entirely instrumental concept album, based on the storm that sank the Rouse Simmons.

The Rouse Simmons was a schooner that for twenty years delivered Christmas trees to Chicago, until on the night of November 23, 1912 it was lost in a storm on Lake Michigan, with all hands and a full cargo of Christmas trees.

The five track titles relate to different aspects of the story.

- The Christmas Tree Ship is about the sinking of the Rouse Simmons itself.
- South Shore, Two Brothers and Three Sisters were the names of three other ships that sank the same night.
- Friday, Everybody Goodbye is the opening sentence of a message in a bottle thrown into the sea by the captain of the Rouse Simmons.

The album was released as a limited-edition CD and DVD, but the general release was only as an MP3 download. Since then, I Like Trains have made the album a one-track EP for download.

== Track listing ==
1. "The Christmas Tree Ship"
2. "South Shore"
3. "Two Brothers"
4. "Three Sisters"
5. "Friday, Everybody Goodbye"
