= The Shallows (album) =

Studio album by I Like Trains
- Released: 7 May 2012
- Label: I Like Records
- Producer: Richard Formby

I Like Trains chronology
This Skin Full of Bones (2011)	The Shallows (2012)	Beacons (2012)

The Shallows is an album by the band I Like Trains, released on 7 May 2012.

It is a concept album based on the book The Shallows by Nicholas Carr. It was produced by Richard Formby.

== Track listing ==
1. "Beacons"
2. "Mnemosyne"
3. "The Shallows"
4. "Water/Sand"
5. "The Hive"
6. "The Turning Of The Bones"
7. "Reykjavik"
8. "We Used To Talk"
9. "In Tongues"
