= I Like Trains =

English alternative/post-rock band

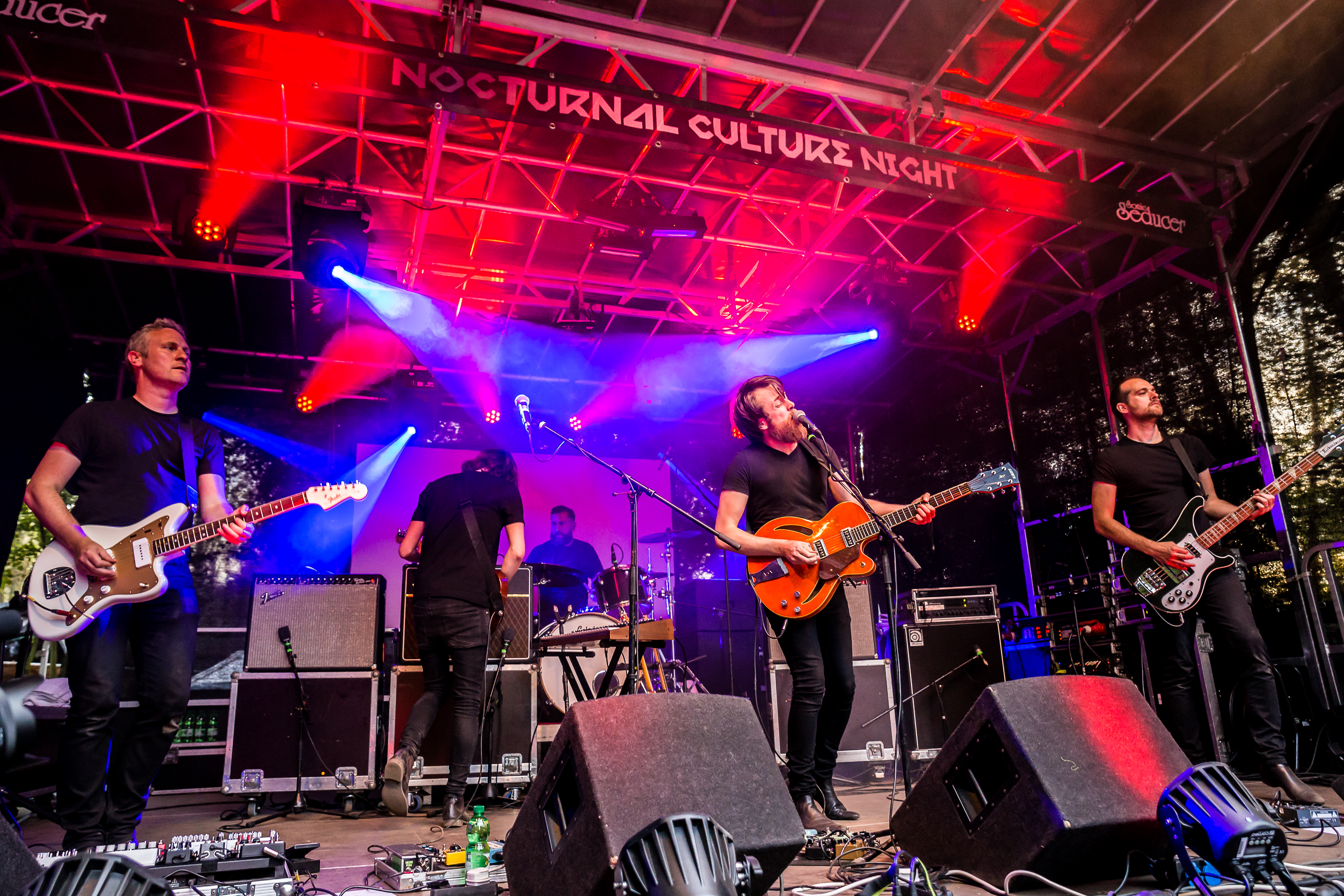
- I Like Trains live at Nocturnal Culture Night, 2018

Background information
- Origin: Leeds, West Yorkshire, England
- Genres: Alternative rock, post-rock
- Years active: 2004–present
- Labels: Dance to the Radio, Fierce Panda Records, Talitres, Beggars Banquet
- Members: Guy Bannister; Alistair Bowis; Simon Fogal; David Martin; Ian Jarrold
- Past members: Ashley Dean
- Website: iliketrains.co.uk

I Like Trains (previously styled as iLiKETRAiNS) is an English alternative/post-rock band, formed in Leeds, West Yorkshire. It draws its inspiration from historical failings and a pessimistic world view.

I Like Trains has had its music used in Hollywood film trailers, advertisements and television, including an episode of CSI: Miami.

== History ==
=== Beginnings and debut album : 2004–2008 ===
I Like Trains was formed in 2004 and consists of David Martin (lead vocals, guitar), Guy Bannister (guitar, synthesisers and vocals), Alistair Bowis (bass guitar, synthesisers and vocals) and Simon Fogal (drums). That year, they self-released a single called "Autumn 2004". In 2005, the band self-released another single, "Stainless Steel", and its first official single, "Before the Curtains Close", on Dance to the Radio limited to 500 copies on 7" vinyl. In June 2006, its first EP, Progress Reform, was released by Fierce Panda Records and the song "Terra Nova" was released as a single which went to number 132 in the UK Chart. In 2007, a first album, Elegies to Lessons Learnt, was released by Beggars Banquet Records, with the songs on the album based on tragic historical events and figures, created after thorough research and study. Three singles were released from the album, "Spencer Perceval", "The Deception" and "We Go Hunting". Elegies to Lessons Learnt then went to number 17 on the UK Indie Chart. In late 2008, the band released its second EP, The Christmas Tree Ship.

=== He Who Saw the Deep and The Shallows : 2009–2012 ===
Having been dropped by the record label, Beggars Banquet, the band founded its own label ILR (I Like Records) in 2009 and released a second album, He Who Saw The Deep in 2010 which had two singles, "Sea of Regrets" and "A Fathers Son". The crowd-funding platform PledgeMusic was used to raise money to produce and release the album.

In 2012, a third album, The Shallows, was released.

=== Tenth anniversary ===
To celebrate ten years in existence and also the centenary of the Brudenell Social Club, I Like Trains performed a special gig at the venue in Leeds where, for the first time, Progress Reform was performed in full. Progress Reform was also remastered and re-released on 4 November 2013 as a 500-copy limited edition vinyl album.

=== A Divorce Before Marriage ===
A Divorce Before Marriage, a film about the band by Matt Hopkins and Ben Lankester, was released in 2016. It had been in production since the recording of The Shallows. An album with the same title accompanied the film.

=== KOMPROMAT ===
On 6 May 2020, the band announced another album KOMPROMAT, and released the single "The Truth" as well as its video. It was released on 21 August 2020 on a new label, Atlantic Curve.

== Gallery ==
I Like Trains, Line-up live at Nocturnal Culture Night 2018 in Deutzen, Germany

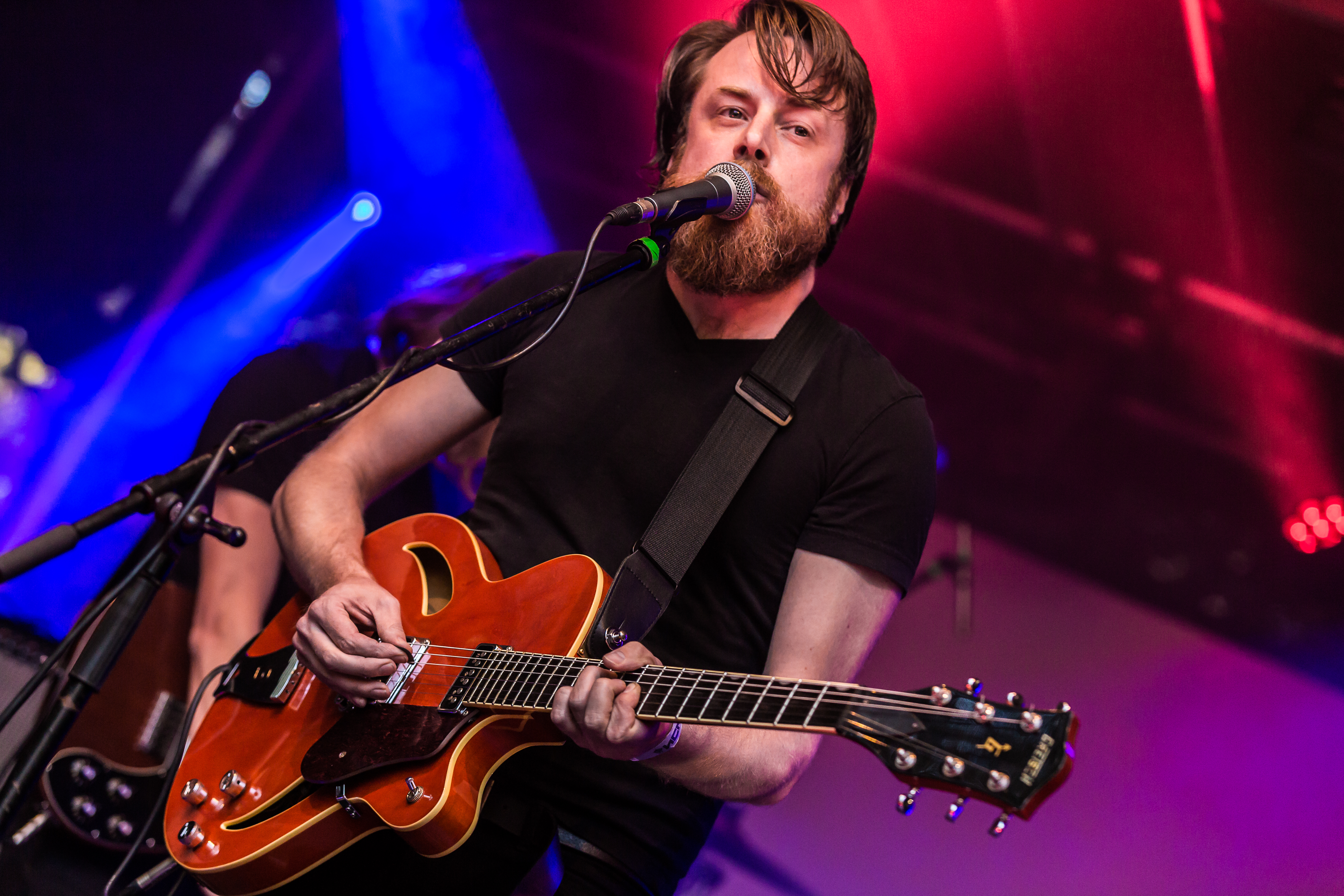
Singer David Martin

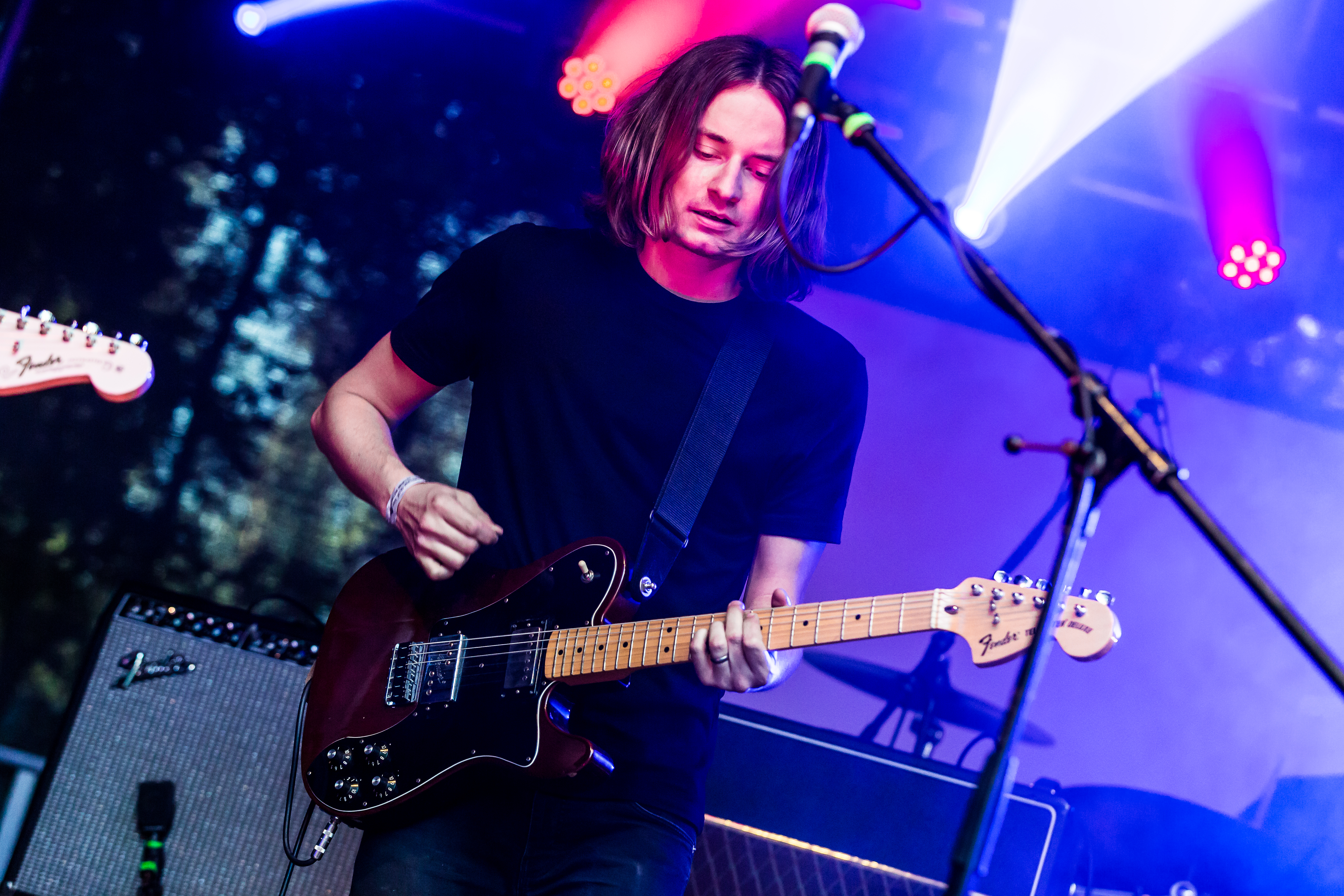
Guitarist Guy Bannister

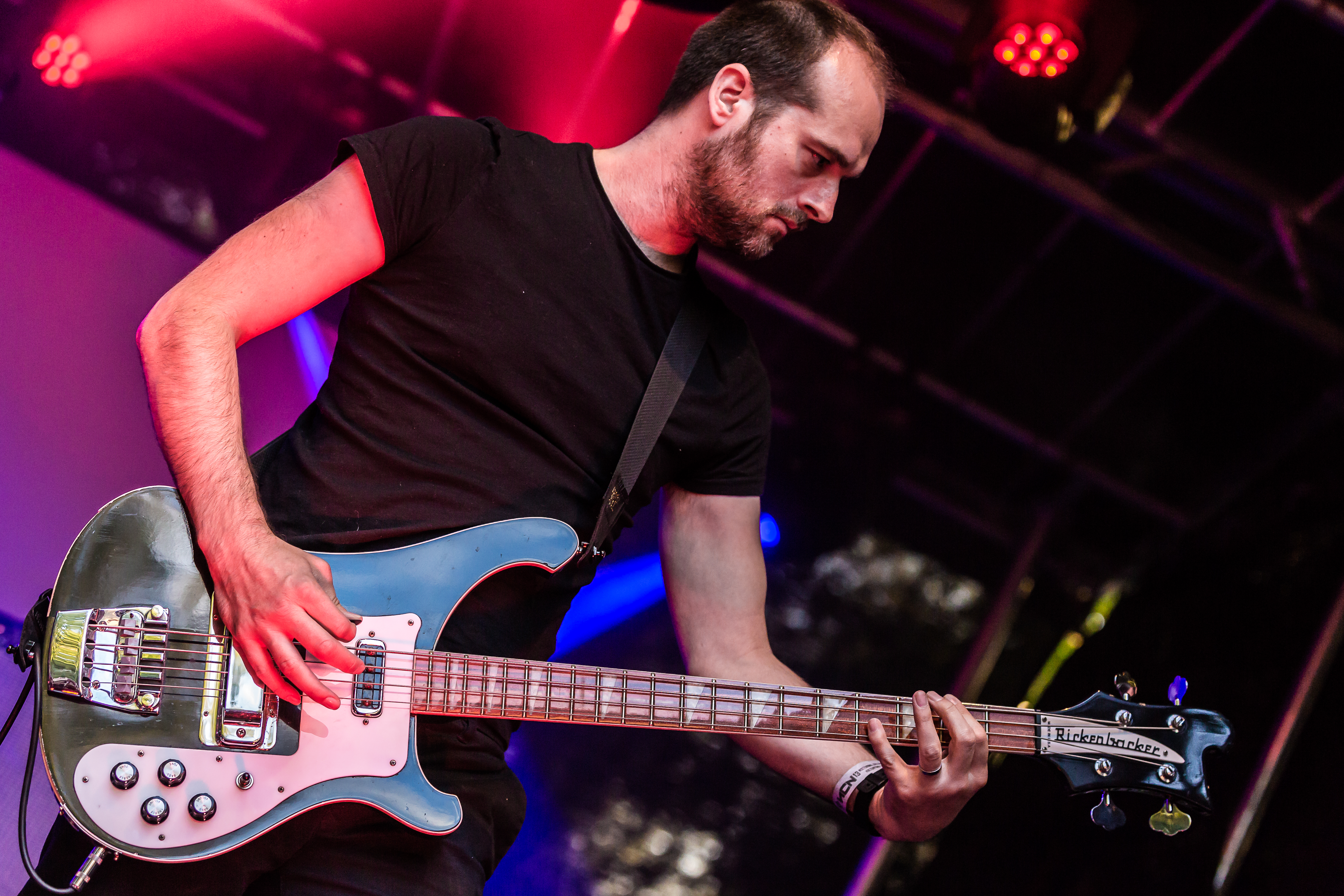
Bass guitarist Alistair Bowis

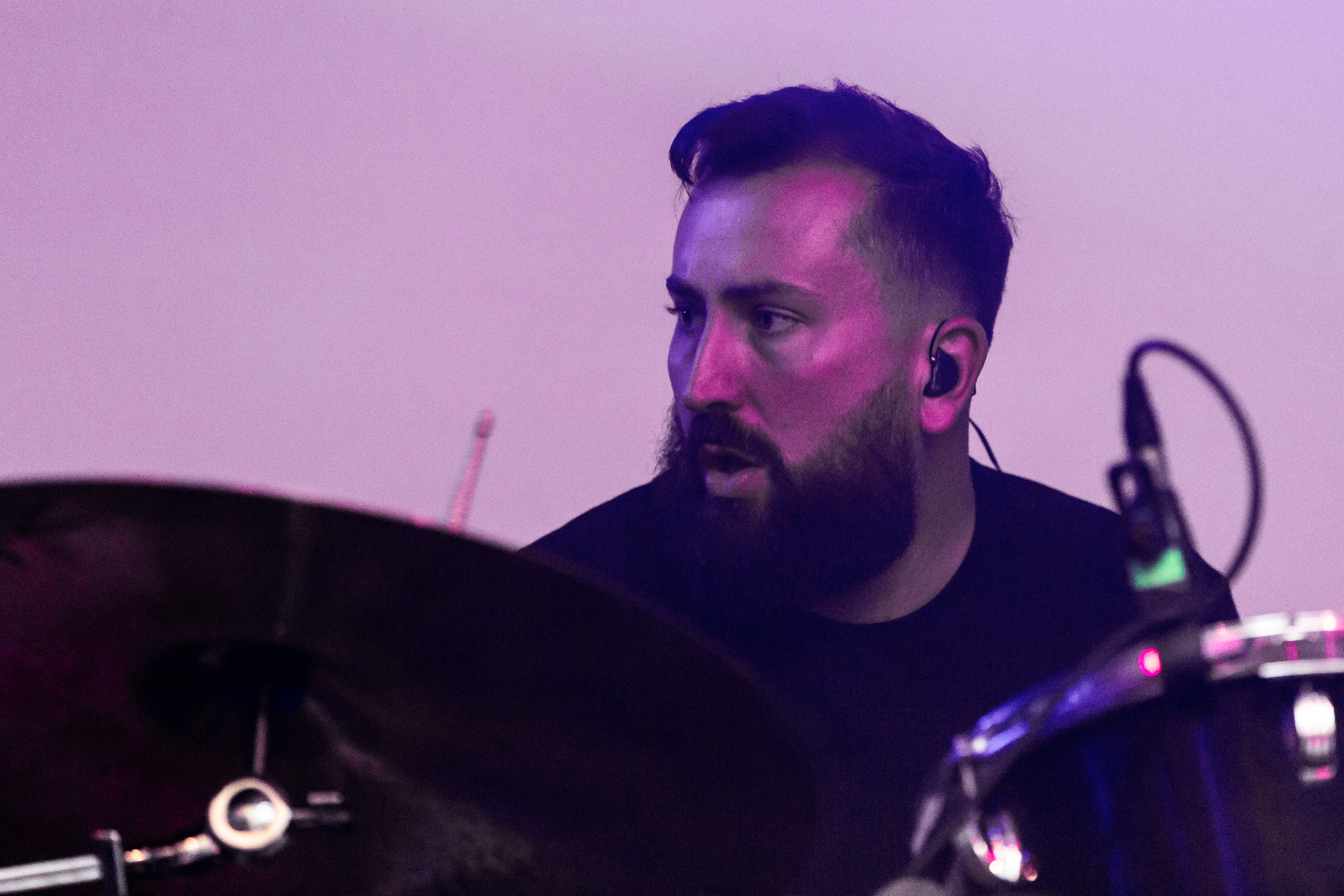
Drummer Simon Fogal

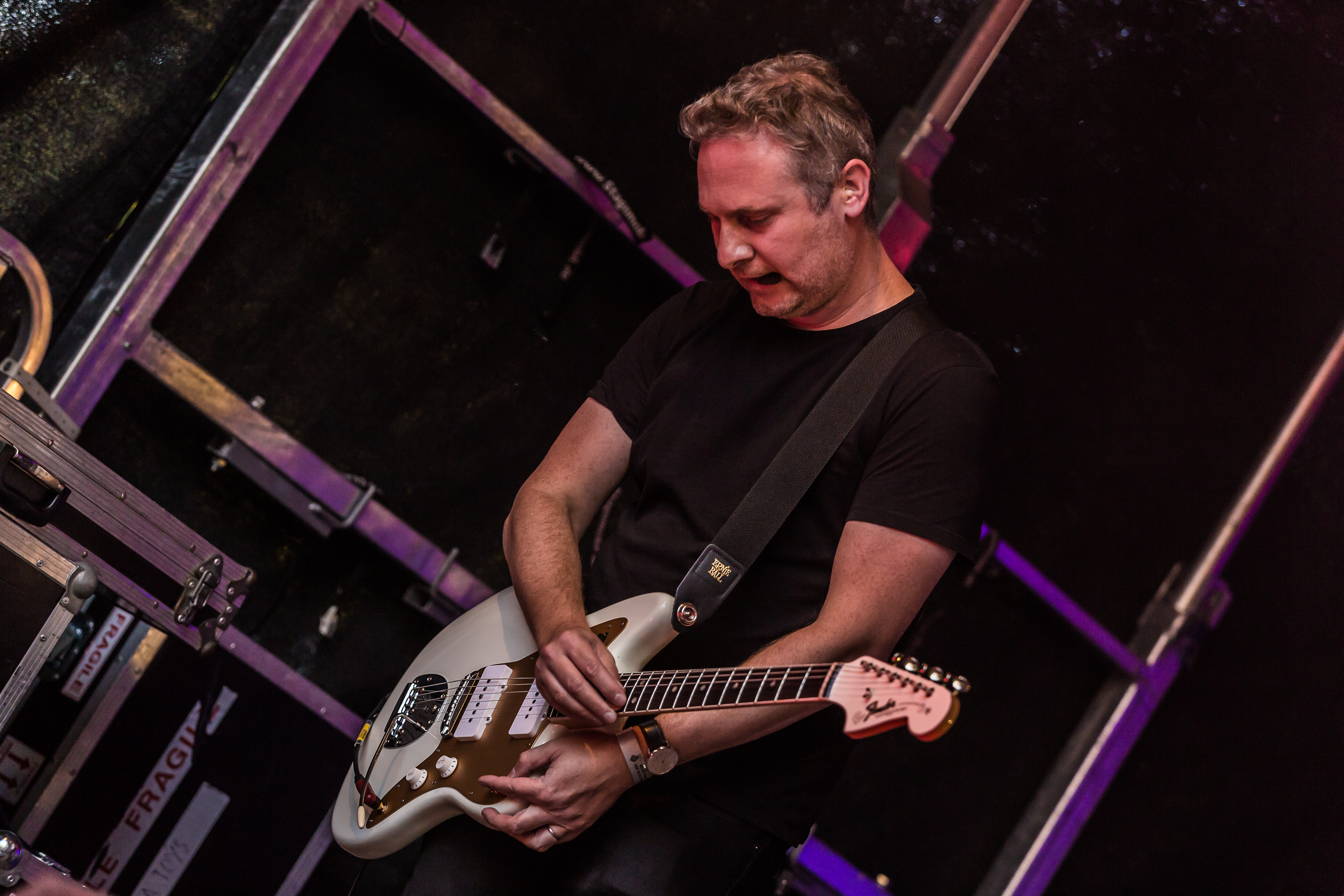
Guitarist Ian Jarrold

== Discography ==
=== Albums and EPs ===
- Progress Reform (EP; 26 June 2006)
- Elegies to Lessons Learnt (album; 1 October 2007) UK Indie Chart No. 17
- The Christmas Tree Ship (EP; 24 November 2008)
- He Who Saw The Deep (album; 4 October 2010)
- This Skin Full of Bones (EP (CD+DVD); 22 November 2011)
- The Shallows (album; 2 April 2012)
- Beacons (EP; 15 October 2012)
- A Divorce Before Marriage (album; 2 December 2016)
- Kompromat (album; 21 August 2020)

=== Singles ===
- "Stainless Steel" (Early 2005)
- "Before the Curtains Close Pts 1 & 2" (4 July 2005)
- "A Rook House For Bobby" (17 October 2005)
- "Terra Nova" / "Fram" (29 May 2006) UK Chart No. 132
- "Spencer Perceval" / "I Am Murdered" (26 March 2007) UK Chart No. 195
- "The Deception" (10 September 2007) UK Chart No. 164, UK Indie Chart No. 9
- "We Go Hunting" (21 April 2008)
- "Sea of Regrets" (12 October 2009)
- "A Father's Son" (10 September 2010)
- "Mnemosyne" (22 May 2012)
- "The Truth" (6 May 2020)
- "The Spectacle" (15 September 2022)
