= John Reeger =

American actor and playwright

John Reeger (born 20th century) is an American actor and playwright, based in Chicago.

== Performances ==
=== Theatre at the Center, Munster, Indiana ===
- Horace Vandergelder in Hello, Dolly!
- The Old Man in A Christmas Story: The Musical
- Seabon Faulk, HaHa Jones, Farley Wood in A Christmas Memory

=== Drury Lane Theatre, Illinois ===
- Sherlock Holmes in Sherlock's Last Case
- The Wizard in Once Upon a Mattress
- Scrooge in A Christmas Carol
- John Barrymore in I Hate Hamlet
- Capt Hook in Peter Pan
- Fagin in Oliver!
- Henry Higgins in My Fair Lady
- Franz in The Sound of Music

=== Marriott Theatre, Lincolnshire, Illinois ===
His fifteen productions include:

- Max in Sunset Boulevard
- Georges in La Cage Aux Folles
- Billy Flynn in Chicago

=== Court Theatre, Chicago ===
His thirty productions include:

- Gabriel Conroy in James Joyce's The Dead
- Polonius in Hamlet
- Malvolio in Twelfth Night
- Col. Pickering in My Fair Lady
- Hay Fever
- Twelfth Night
- Piano
- Life's a Dream
- The Learned Ladies
- Fair Ladies at a Game of Poem Cards
- Gross Indecency
- Nora
- The Little Foxes
- La Bête
- Putting It Together
- An Ideal Husband
- The Cherry Orchard
- Old Times
- Tartuffe
- The Philadelphia Story
- The Play's the Thing
- Henry IV, Part 1
- Travesties
- The Misanthrope
- The Triumph of Love
- Cloud Nine
- A Midsummer Night's Dream
- Much Ado About Nothing
- Woyzeck
- The Seagull

=== Chicago Shakespeare Theater ===
- King John
- The Moliere Comedies
- The Winter's Tale

=== Northlight ===
- Woody Guthrie's American Song
- Enter the Guardsman

=== Steppenwolf Theatre Company ===
- The Ballad of Littke Jo

== Works ==
=== The Christmas Schooner ===
With Julie Shannon creating the music and lyrics, Reeger wrote The Christmas Schooner which premiered at Chicago's Bailiwick Repertory Theatre and received the 1996 Chicago After Dark Award for outstanding new work. A twelve-year (as of 2006) continuing seasonal run has followed as well as a CD, and productions in the Midwest, Texas and California have also been successful.

Based on the true story of a Great Lakes schooner captain who risks life and limb to transport fir trees from the Upper Peninsula of Michigan to Chicago's German immigrants during the late 19th century.

=== Let the Eagle Fly ===
With Shannon again creating the music and lyrics, Reeger wrote Let the Eagle Fly, the story of Cesar Chavez.

== Personal life ==
He is married to Paula Scrofano and has two children.

== See also ==
- Theatre in Chicago
