= Chess (musical) =

1984 musical by Björn Ulvaeus, Benny Andersson and Tim Rice

- Concept album cover
- Music: Benny Andersson; Björn Ulvaeus
- Lyrics: Tim Rice; Björn Ulvaeus (Swedish translation)
- Book: Tim Rice (West End version); Richard Nelson (original Broadway version); Danny Strong (Broadway revival version)
- Productions: 1986 West End; 1988 Broadway; 1990 First US tour 1990 First UK tour 2010 Second UK tour 2018 West End revival 2025 Broadway revival

Chess is a 1986 musical with music by Benny Andersson and Björn Ulvaeus of the pop group ABBA, lyrics by Ulvaeus and Tim Rice, and book by Rice. The story involves a politically charged, Cold War–era chess tournament between two grandmasters, one American and the other Soviet, and their fight over a woman who manages one and falls in love with the other. Although the protagonists were not intended to represent any real individuals, the character of the American grandmaster was loosely based on Bobby Fischer, while elements of the story may have been inspired by the chess careers of Russian grandmasters Viktor Korchnoi and Anatoly Karpov.

Chess allegorically reflected the Cold War tensions present in the 1980s. The musical has been referred to as a metaphor for the Cold War, with the insinuation that the Cold War is itself a manipulative game. Released and staged at the height of the strong anti-communist agenda that came to be known as the "Reagan Doctrine", Chess addressed and satirized the hostility of the international political atmosphere of the 1980s.

As with other productions such as Jesus Christ Superstar and Evita—both of which Rice developed with Andrew Lloyd Webber—a highly successful concept album was released prior to the first theatrical production in order to raise money. In the case of Chess, the concept album was released in late 1984 while the show opened in 1986 in London's West End, where it played for three years. A much-altered US version premiered on Broadway in 1988 with a book by Richard Nelson, but survived only for two months. Chess is frequently revised for new productions, many of which try to merge elements from both the British and American versions, but was not revived in the West End until 2019. Chess was revived on Broadway in 2025 with a new book by Danny Strong, and it closed on June 21, 2026.

Chess placed seventh in a BBC Radio 2 listener poll of the UK's "Number One Essential Musicals".

== Development ==
Tim Rice, a lyricist and librettist on musicals such as Jesus Christ Superstar and Evita, had long wanted to write a musical about the Cold War. During the mid-1970s, he had discussed the idea of a musical about the Cuban Missile Crisis with his usual collaborator, composer Andrew Lloyd Webber, but the idea never came to fruition.

By the late 1970s, Rice had become inspired to tell his Cold War story through the prism of the long-standing United States-Soviet Union chess rivalry; he had earlier been fascinated by the political machinations of the 1972 "Match of the Century" between Bobby Fischer and Boris Spassky. However, by the time Rice wanted to begin work on the musical in early 1979, Lloyd Webber was unavailable, as he was already at work on his next musical, Cats.

Subsequently, American producer Richard Vos suggested to Rice to work with Andersson and Ulvaeus instead, knowing that they were looking to develop and produce projects outside of ABBA. A fan of the group, Rice agreed. He later wrote that he felt no reservations because "there is a sense of theatre in the ABBA style". With Vos also in attendance, Rice met with the two in Stockholm for the first time on 15 December 1981 in order to discuss the concept, and they signed on to the project.

All through 1982 and 1983, the three men worked on the music and lyrics. Rice would describe the mood of particular songs he wanted, then Andersson and Ulvaeus would write and record the music and send the tapes to Rice, who would then write lyrics to fit the music, and send the resulting tapes back to Andersson and Ulvaeus and so on.

Some of the songs on the resulting album contained elements of music Andersson and Ulvaeus had previously written for ABBA. For example, the chorus of "I Know Him So Well" was based on the chorus of "I Am An A", a song from their 1977 tour, while the chorus of "Anthem" used the chord structures from the guitar solo from their 1980 ABBA song "Our Last Summer".

Ulvaeus would also provide dummy lyrics to emphasize the rhythmic patterns of the music, and since Rice found a number of these "embarrassingly good" as they were, incorporated a few in the final version. An example is "One night in Bangkok makes a hard man humble". One song, which became "Heaven Help My Heart", was recorded with an entire set of lyrics, sung by ABBA's Agnetha Fältskog with the title "Every Good Man", although none of the original lyrics from this song were used.

Partly to raise money in order to produce the show in the West End and partly to see how the material would fare with the public, it was decided to release the music as an album before any stage productions were undertaken, a strategy that had proven successful with Rice's two previous musicals, Jesus Christ Superstar and Evita.

Owing in part to the different countries in which the lyricist and composers resided, recording on the album musical of Chess began in Stockholm in early November 1983, with Andersson recording the many layered keyboard parts himself along with other basic work at their usual Polar Studios, and choral and orchestral work then recorded in London by The Ambrosian Singers along with the London Symphony Orchestra. The album was then sound-engineered and mixed back at Polar by longtime ABBA sound engineer Michael B. Tretow.

== Original album ==
=== History ===
The double LP was released worldwide in the autumn of 1984 by RCA Records. Liner notes included with the album featured a basic synopsis of the story in multiple languages along with song lyrics and photos. The music on the album was described by The New York Times as "a sumptuously recorded... grandiose pastiche that touches half a dozen bases, from Gilbert and Sullivan to late Rodgers and Hammerstein, from Italian opera to trendy synthesizer-based pop, all of it lavishly arranged for the London Symphony Orchestra with splashy electronic embellishments". The album featured Murray Head, Tommy Körberg, Elaine Paige, and actor Denis Quilley in the role of Molokov. A single from the album, "One Night in Bangkok", with verses performed by Murray Head and choruses performed by Anders Glenmark, became a worldwide hit, reaching #3 on the US Billboard Hot 100. The duet "I Know Him So Well" by Elaine Paige and Barbara Dickson held the #1 spot on the UK singles charts for four weeks, winning the Ivor Novello Award in the process as the Best Selling Single ('A' Side).

On 27 October 1984, a concert version of the album was premiered by the original cast in London's Barbican Centre and then performed in Hamburg, Amsterdam, and Paris with final presentation on 1 November in Berwaldhallen in Stockholm.

In 1985, music videos were filmed for the songs "One Night in Bangkok", "Nobody's Side", "The Arbiter", and the ballads "I Know Him So Well" and "Pity the Child", featuring the performers from the album, directed by David G Hillier and produced by Nick Maingay. These were released together in a VHS video entitled Chess Moves.

=== Critical reception ===
The original concept album received critical accolades, with Rolling Stone saying that the "dazzling score covers nearly all the pop bases", Kurt Ganzl's Blackwell Guide to the Musical Theatre on Record telling readers about the "thrilling exposition of an exciting piece of modern musical theater occurring before the event" and Time declaring that the "rock-symphonic synthesis [was] ripe with sophistication and hummable tunes".

The album became a Top 10 hit in the UK, West Germany and South Africa, reached #47 on the US Billboard 200, #39 in France, #35 in Australia, and for seven weeks remained at #1 on the Swedish album chart. The recording also received several awards, including the Goldene Europa from Germany, the Edison Award from the Netherlands, and the Rockbjörn from Sweden.

=== Principal cast ===
- The American – Murray Head
- The Russian – Tommy Körberg
- Florence – Elaine Paige
- Molokov – Denis Quilley
- The Arbiter – Björn Skifs
- Svetlana – Barbara Dickson

=== Track listing ===
All lyrics are written by Tim Rice & Björn Ulvaeus; all music is composed by Benny Andersson & Björn Ulvaeus.

Side One
| No. | Title | Performed by | Length |
|---|---|---|---|
| 1. | "Merano" | Chorus of Townspeople, The American | 6:59 |
| 2. | "The Russian and Molokov / Where I Want to Be" | The Russian and Molokov / The Russian | 6:19 |
| 3. | "Opening Ceremony" | The Arbiter with Ensemble of Townspeople, Russian Heavies and Merchandisers | 9:18 |
| 4. | "Quartet (A Model of Decorum and Tranquility)" | Molokov, Florence, The Arbiter and The Russian | 2:17 |

Side Two
| No. | Title | Performed by | Length |
|---|---|---|---|
| 5. | "The American and Florence / Nobody's Side" | Florence and The American / Florence | 5:25 |
| 6. | "Chess" (Instrumental) | | 5:44 |
| 7. | "Mountain Duet" | Florence and The Russian | 4:42 |
| 8. | "Florence Quits" | Florence and The American | 2:52 |
| 9. | "Embassy Lament" | Chorus of Embassy Clerks | 1:30 |
| 10. | "Anthem" | The Russian | 3:03 |

Side Three
| No. | Title | Performed by | Length |
|---|---|---|---|
| 1. | "Bangkok / One Night in Bangkok" | The American and Ensemble | 5:00 |
| 2. | "Heaven Help My Heart" | Florence | 3:29 |
| 3. | "Argument" | Florence and The Russian | 1:50 |
| 4. | "I Know Him So Well" | Florence and Svetlana | 4:16 |
| 5. | "The Deal (No Deal)" | The American, The Russian, Molokov and Florence | 3:55 |
| 6. | "Pity the Child" | The American | 5:29 |

Side Four
| No. | Title | Performed by | Length |
|---|---|---|---|
| 7. | "Endgame" | Molokov, The Russian, The American, Florence, Svetlana and Ensemble | 10:46 |
| 8. | "Epilogue: You and I / The Story of Chess / You and I (Reprise)" | Florence, The Russian, and Ensemble | 10:24 |
| Total length: | | | 93:18 |

=== Deluxe edition album ===
A 2014 release called Chess: The Original Recording Remastered Deluxe Edition was released in celebration of the 30th anniversary original double album. Released as a double-CD and single DVD, the album features the complete original 1984 concept recording. The remastered and expanded (deluxe) edition includes three previously unreleased bonus tracks as well as a DVD featuring a documentary and five video clips of songs from the album.

==== CD ====
Previously unreleased bonus tracks.

Chess: The Original Recording Remastered Deluxe Edition
| No. | Title | Performed by | Length |
|---|---|---|---|
| 9. | "Press Conference" | The Ambrosian Singers | 4:35 |
| 10. | "Intro Mountain Duet (Der Kleine Franz)" | London Symphony Orchestra | 1:54 |
| 11. | "Anthem" (Instrumental) | London Symphony Orchestra | 2:55 |
| Total length: | | | 102:42 |

==== DVD ====
Documentary:

- Magasinet Special: Chess 1984 – London Symphony Orchestra, Tommy Körberg, Elaine Paige, Murray Head, Anders Eljas, Denis Quilley, Barbara Dickson, Björn Skifs

Music videos (all of which can be found on Chess Moves):

- "One Night in Bangkok" – Murray Head
- "Nobody's Side" – Elaine Paige
- "The Arbiter" – Björn Skifs
- "I Know Him So Well" – Elaine Paige, Barbara Dickson
- "Pity the Child" – Murray Head

=== Charts ===
==== Weekly charts ====
| Chart (1984–85) | Peak position |
|---|---|
| Australian Albums (Kent Music Report) | 35 |
| Austrian Albums (Ö3 Austria) | 17 |
| Dutch Albums (Album Top 100) | 30 |
| European Albums (Eurotipsheet) | 9 |
| German Albums (Offizielle Top 100) | 6 |
| New Zealand Albums (RMNZ) | 20 |
| Norwegian Albums (VG-lista) | 3 |
| Swedish Albums (Sverigetopplistan) | 1 |
| Swiss Albums (Schweizer Hitparade) | 3 |
| UK Albums (Official Charts) | 10 |
| US Billboard 200 | 47 |

==== Year-end charts ====
| Chart (1985) | Position |
|---|---|
| German Albums (Offizielle Top 100) | 29 |
| New Zealand Albums (RMNZ) | 37 |
| Swiss Albums (Schweizer Hitparade) | 24 |

== British stage version ==
=== History of the original West End production (1986–1989) ===
Chess premiered in London's West End on 14 May 1986 at the Prince Edward Theatre. The original production was originally set to be directed by Michael Bennett, but after casting the show and commissioning the expansive set and costume designs, he withdrew from the project for health reasons and died on 2 July 1987 from AIDS-related lymphoma. Trevor Nunn, who had directed the musicals Cats and Les Misérables, took over as director. Set designer Robin Wagner later told Lynn Pecktal, author of the book Set Design, that Bennett had planned a "multimedia" show, with an elaborate tilting floor, banks of television monitors, and other technological touches. Nunn applied his realistic style to the show instead, although the basics of the mammoth set design were still present in the final production. These included three video walls, the main of which featured commentary from chess master William Hartston, and appearances from various BBC newsreaders rounding out the package. Costs were estimated at up to $12 million.

The London version expanded the storyline of the concept album, adding considerable new recitative. The three principal singers from the concept album, Elaine Paige, Tommy Körberg and Murray Head reprised their roles on stage. Barbara Dickson was unable to appear, and Siobhán McCarthy played the part of Svetlana, and the cast also featured Anthony Head, Grainne Renihan, Ria Jones, David Burt and Peter Karrie, during its three-year run. The show received the 1986 Critics' Circle Theatre Award for Best Musical and received three 1986 Laurence Olivier Award nominations for Best Musical, Outstanding Performance by an Actor (Tommy Körberg) and Outstanding Performance by an Actress (Elaine Paige). The production closed on 8 April 1989.

==== Critical reception ====
The premiere of the musical provoked an overall mixed to favourable verdict from the critics and, according to Variety, created "one of the bigger West End mob scenes in recent memory". Most of the naysaying notices had comments ranging from "far too long" and "shallow, improbable story masquerading as a serious musical" from The Sunday Times to The Guardian's conclusion that, "A musical is only as good as its book, and here one is confronted by an inchoate mess." Other newspapers posted rave reviews however. The Daily Telegraph wrote that the show was "gift-wrapped and gorgeous...compels admiration", The Times noted that "it turns out to be a fine piece of work that shows the dinosaur mega-musical evolving into an intelligent form of life" and Today called it "gripping, eye-catching.. nearly a major triumph". In addition, Michael Ratcliffe wrote in Observer that the "operetta plot which would have delighted a mature Lehar is dramatised in a buoyant, eclectic and stirring theatre-score" and called Körberg "the indisputable star of the show". Sheridan Morley in International Herald Tribune complimented the show's "remarkably coherent dramatic shape" and "staging of considerable intelligence and invention".

=== Plot summary ===
==== Act 1 ====
The president of the International Chess Federation—the Arbiter—speculates on the origins of the game of chess ("Story of Chess") before announcing the location of the upcoming world chess championship: Merano, Italy. As the townsfolk prepare for the occasion ("Merano"), the current world champion, Freddie Trumper of the United States, arrives with his second and presumed lover: Hungarian-born, English-raised Florence Vassy ("Freddie's Entrance"). Florence confronts Freddie about his brash behavior and rocky relationship with the press ("Commie Newspapers"), which immediately gets out of hand when he assaults a journalist who questions his relationship with Florence ("Press Conference"). Meanwhile, Freddie's Soviet Russian challenger, Anatoly Sergievsky, argues with his own second, the scheming Molokov ("Anatoly and Molokov"). Afterwards, in private, Anatoly cynically reflects on the selling out of his dreams to get to where he is today ("Where I Want to Be").

The opening ceremony features the American and Soviet delegates each vowing their side will win ("Diplomats"), the Arbiter insisting on a clean game ("The Arbiter"), and marketers looking to make a profit ("Hymn to Chess" / "Merchandisers"). During the increasingly intense match, Freddie suddenly throws the chessboard to the floor and storms out of the arena ("Chess #1"), leaving Florence to negotiate with Anatoly, Molokov, and the Arbiter ("Quartet"). Florence manages to arrange a meeting between the two players, after trading heated words with Molokov. It turns out that Freddie engineered the outburst in the hopes of extracting more money from his sponsor, an American sensationalist media company called Global Television, though Walter de Courcey — the company's representative in Freddie's delegation — criticizes the stunt as ludicrous ("Florence and Molokov"). Florence later scolds Freddie, and they fight about the politics of the tournament until he viciously turns the argument toward her missing father, believed captured or killed by Soviet forces during the 1956 Hungarian Revolution ("1956: Budapest is Rising"). She laments the situation alone ("Nobody's Side") before heading off to the Merano Mountain Inn for the reconciliatory meeting she has scheduled between Freddie and Anatoly ("Der Kleine Franz"). Freddie does not immediately turn up, though, leaving Anatoly and Florence awkwardly alone together; however, they eventually embrace as romantic feelings arise before being finally interrupted by Freddie, who was working out new financial terms with Global TV ("Mountain Duet").

The chess match proceeds. Distracted by the loss of Florence's love, however, Freddie flounders, leaving himself just one more loss away from losing his title ("Chess #2"). Due to Freddie's atrocious attitude, Florence finally deserts him ("Florence Quits"), whereby Freddie ponders how his unhappy childhood left him the man he is today ("Pity the Child"). He sends the Arbiter a letter of resignation, resulting in Anatoly becoming the new world champion. Anatoly immediately defects from the Soviet Union and seeks asylum at the British embassy ("Defection" / "Embassy Lament"). Florence, accompanying Anatoly, reflects on their newfound romance ("Heaven Help My Heart"). Meanwhile, Walter tips off the press about this scandal. When the mob of reporters ambush Anatoly and ask why he is deserting his country ("Anatoly and the Press"), he tells them that he will never truly leave his homeland. ("Anthem").

==== Act 2 ====
A year later, Anatoly is set to defend his championship in Bangkok, Thailand ("Golden Bangkok"). Freddie is already there, chatting up locals and experiencing the Bangkok nightlife ("One Night in Bangkok"); he is Global TV's official commentator for the match. Florence and Anatoly are now openly lovers, and worry about Freddie's sudden reappearance as well as the impending arrival of Anatoly's estranged wife, Svetlana, from Russia ("One More Opponent" / "You and I"), which Anatoly suspects is part of Molokov's plan to shame him into returning to the Soviet Union. Molokov, meanwhile, has trained a new protégé, Leonid Viigand, to challenge, defeat, and humiliate Anatoly ("The Soviet Machine").

Walter, now Freddie's boss, manipulates Freddie into embarrassing Anatoly on live TV during an eventually heated interview between them ("The Interview"). Molokov, who indeed is responsible for Svetlana's presence in Bangkok, blackmails her into urging Anatoly to throw the match. Walter, who has been promised the release of certain captured American agents if he can ruin Anatoly's performance, informs Florence that her father is still alive though imprisoned, and that he too will be released if she can convince Anatoly to lose. Despite Molokov and Walter's efforts, none of their ploys work to get Anatoly to throw the game. As a result, Molokov and Walter team up to get Freddie to personally persuade Anatoly and Florence, knowing that Freddie is vengeful toward Anatoly and interested in winning back the love of Florence; however, Freddie's attempts also fail ("The Deal").

Surprisingly, Svetlana and Florence end up bonding over their respective relationships with Anatoly. Florence ultimately admits that it would be best for Anatoly to return to his children and Svetlana, while Svetlana accepts that Anatoly has long fallen out of love with her ("I Know Him So Well"). Anatoly, meanwhile, follows an anonymous letter guiding him to Wat Pho, where Freddie appears to tell him that he is willing to put their conflict behind him. Having decided that he only wants Anatoly to "be true to the game", Freddie informs Anatoly of a significant flaw in Viigand's strategy that will help Anatoly win ("Talking Chess").

In the deciding game of the match, with the score tied at five games all, Anatoly's mind is torn between his devotion to the game and winning and the impact it has on his family and his lover. In his imagination, Svetlana castigates Anatoly for wallowing in the crowd's empty praise and Florence expresses similar annoyance at him for casting aside his ideals; regardless, Anatoly decides to remain true to the game and achieves a superb victory against Viigand ("Endgame"). Later, Florence confesses her feelings that he should return to his family in the Soviet Union. The pair reflects on the conclusion of their romance ("You and I: Reprise").

==== Epilogue ====
Walter later approaches Florence with the news that Anatoly has defected back to the USSR, meaning that her father will certainly be released. He startlingly admits, however, that no one actually knows if her father is still alive. Florence breaks down, realising that she too has been used, and she sadly mirrors Anatoly's earlier sentiment that her only borders lie around her heart ("Anthem: Reprise").

=== Original West End cast ===
- Frederick Trumper, The American – Murray Head
- Florence Vassy – Elaine Paige
- Anatoly Sergievsky, The Russian – Tommy Körberg
- Alexander Molokov – John Turner
- Walter de Courcey – Kevin Colson
- The Arbiter – Tom Jobe
- Svetlana Sergievsky – Siobhán McCarthy
- Mayor of Merano – Richard Mitchell
- T.V. Presenter – Peter Karrie
- Civil Servants – Richard Lyndon, Paul Wilson
- Tea Lady - Julie Armstrong

=== Songs ===
Act 1

- "The Story of Chess" – The Arbiter and Ensemble
- "Merano": ^{†}
  - "Merano" – Mayor and Ensemble
  - "Freddie's Entrance" – Freddie and Florence
  - "Merano (Reprise)" – Ensemble
- "Commie Newspapers" – Freddie and Florence
- "Press Conference" – Freddie, Florence, and Reporters
- "Anatoly & Molokov" / "Where I Want to Be" ^{†} – Anatoly and Molokov / Anatoly and Ensemble
- "Diplomats" ^{‡} – Molokov, Walter, and Ensemble
- "The Arbiter" – The Arbiter and Ensemble
- "Hymn to Chess" – Ensemble
- "Merchandisers" – Ensemble
- "Chess #1" – Instrumental
- "The Arbiter (Reprise)" – The Arbiter and Ensemble
- "Quartet (A Model of Decorum and Tranquility)" – Molokov, Florence, The Arbiter, and Anatoly
- "Florence and Molokov" – Molokov, Florence, Walter, and Freddie
- "1956 – Budapest is Rising" – Florence and Freddie
- "Nobody's Side" – Florence and Ensemble
- "Der Kleine Franz" – Ensemble
- "Mountain Duet" – Florence and Anatoly
- "Chess #2" – Instrumental
- "Florence Quits" – Freddie and Florence
- "Pity the Child" – Freddie and Ensemble
- "Defection Scene" – Instrumental
- "Embassy Lament" – English Civil Servants
- "Heaven Help My Heart" – Florence
- "Anatoly and the Press" – Anatoly and Reporters
- "Anthem" – Anatoly and Ensemble

Act 2

- "Golden Bangkok" / "One Night in Bangkok" ^{†} – Instrumental / Freddie and Ensemble
- "One More Opponent" / "You and I" ^{†} – Anatoly and Florence
- "The Soviet Machine" – Molokov and Ensemble
- "The Interview" – Walter, Freddie, and Anatoly
- "Someone Else's Story" ^{§} – Svetlana
- "The Deal" – The Arbiter, Molokov, Svetlana, Walter, Florence, Freddie, Anatoly, and Ensemble
- "I Know Him So Well" – Florence and Svetlana
- "Talking Chess" – Freddie and Anatoly
- "Endgame" – Molokov, Walter, Florence, Anatoly, Svetlana, and Ensemble
- "You and I (Reprise)" – Florence and Anatoly
- "Finale" – Walter and Florence

^{†} The multiple songs listed here are often merged on recordings into a single track.
^{‡} Song is alternately titled "U.S. vs. U.S.S.R."
^{§} This song actually originated with the American (Broadway) version of the musical, but has since been also included in productions and recordings otherwise adhering to the British version. Its placement varies; this is the placement used by the 2008 Royal Albert Hall concert.

== American stage version ==
=== History of the original Broadway production (1988) ===
After the West End production, the creative team decided to reimagine the show from the top down, leading to a second major stage version of the musical intended for American audiences, with considerable differences from the British version in both plot and music. Trevor Nunn brought in playwright Richard Nelson to recreate the musical as a straightforward "book show" for Broadway audiences. Nunn brought in new, younger principals after he disqualified Paige from the role of Florence by insisting Nelson recreate the character as an American. The story changed drastically, with different settings, characters, and many different plot elements, although the basic plot remained the same. Benny Andersson told Variety: "The main difference between London and here is that in London there is only about two or three minutes of spoken dialog. Here, in order to clarify some points, it is almost one-third dialog". The score was reordered, and comparisons of the Broadway cast recording and the original concept album reveal the dramatic extent of the changes. Robin Wagner designed a new set, which featured mobile towers that shifted continuously throughout the show, in an attempt to give it a sense of cinematic fluidity.

The first preview on 11 April 1988 ran 4 hours with a 90-minute intermission (the stage crew reportedly had problems with the sets); by opening night on 28 April, it was down to 3 hours 15 minutes. But despite a healthy box-office advance, the Broadway production did not manage to sustain a consistently large audience and closed on 25 June, after 17 previews and 68 regular performances. "And there I was, on closing night, singing and sobbing along", later wrote Time magazine critic Richard Corliss. Overall, the show (capitalized at $6 million) since its opening, according to Variety, "has been doing moderate business, mainly on the strength of theater party advances". Gerald Schoenfeld, co-producer of the show, noted: "The musical had been playing to about 80 percent capacity, which is considered good, but about 50 percent of the audience have held special, half-priced tickets. If we filled the house at 100 percent at half price, we'd go broke and I haven't seen any surge of tourist business yet this season. The show needs a $350,000 weekly gross to break even, but only a few weeks since its April 28 opening have reached that.... You have to consider what your grosses are going to be in the future".

The Broadway production was nominated for several major awards. It got five nods from the Drama Desk Awards: Outstanding Actor in a Musical (David Carroll), Outstanding Actress in a Musical (Judy Kuhn), Outstanding Featured Actor in a Musical (Harry Goz), Outstanding Music (Andersson and Ulvaeus) and Outstanding Lighting Design (David Hersey). Carroll and Kuhn also received Tony Award nominations in Leading Actor in a Musical and Leading Actress in a Musical categories. None of the nominations resulted in a win, but Philip Casnoff received a 1988 Theatre World Award for Best Debut Performance. The Original Broadway Cast recording of the musical was nominated for the 1988 Grammy Award in the category Best Musical Cast Show Album (won by Into the Woods).

Later, the musical developed a cult following based primarily on the score (Frank Rich noted in his book Hot Seat that "the score retains its devoted fans"), while Nelson's book received more mixed notices. Many attempts were made to fix the Broadway version's perceived problems. In 2001, in an interview with the San Francisco Chronicle, Tim Rice admitted that after the "comparative failure of Chess, his all-time favourite, he became disillusioned with theatre." He commented, "It may sound arrogant, but Chess is as good as anything I've ever done. And maybe it costs too much brainpower for the average person to follow it".

==== Critical reception ====
Many critics panned the show, most notably Frank Rich of The New York Times, who wrote that "the evening has the theatrical consistency of quicksand" and described it as "a suite of temper tantrums, [where] the characters ... yell at one another to rock music". Howard Kissel of New York Daily News complained that "the show is shrilly overamplified" and "neither of the love stories is emotionally involving", while Newsweek magazine called the show a "Broadway's monster" and opined that "Chess assaults the audience with a relentless barrage of scenes and numbers that are muscle-bound with self-importance".

A few reviewers, however, praised it highly. William A. Henry III wrote an exceptionally sympathetic review in Time: "Clear narrative drive, Nunn's cinematic staging, three superb leading performances by actors willing to be complex and unlikeable and one of the best rock scores ever produced in the theater. This is an angry, difficult, demanding and rewarding show, one that pushes the boundaries of the form" (Time, 9 May 1988). His sentiments were echoed by William K. Gale in Providence Journal: "A show with a solid, even wonderfully old-fashioned story that still has a bitter-sweet, rough-edged view of the world ... exciting, dynamic theater ... a match of wit and passion."

Richard Christiansen of Chicago Tribune suggested that "Chess falters despite new strategy", yet concluded his review: "Audiences forgive a lot of failings when they find a show that touches them with its music, and Chess, clumsy and overblown as it sometimes is in its three hours-plus running time, gives them that heart". Welton Jones wrote in The San Diego Union-Tribune that Chess "has one of the richest, most exciting scores heard on Broadway in years ... Sadly, the music has been encumbered with an overwritten book and an uninspired staging ... Truly, this is a score to be treasured, held ransom by a questionable book and production".

All critics agreed, though, on the three leading performances by Judy Kuhn, David Carroll and Philip Casnoff. They were showered with praise – "splendid and gallant" (Newsweek), "powerful singers" (The New York Times), "remarkably fine" (New York Post) – especially Kuhn, whose performance Variety called a "show's chief pleasure".

Benny Andersson commented in Variety on the negative Broadway reviews: "I really don't know why they don't like it. ... I do know that most of the audiences so far stand up and cheer for everyone at the end. They appear to get emotionally involved with the show, and they really like it."

=== Synopsis ===
The musical's American incarnation has noticeably different settings, lyrics, song orders, and a completely different Act 2 from the British version. In particular, in the American Chess the entire show is about one chess match, not two. Act 1 involves the first part of the match, which is held in Bangkok, Thailand, while Act 2 handles the conclusion, and is set in Budapest, Hungary. Also, the incumbent champion is switched in the American version (that is, to Anatoly Sergievsky rather than Freddie Trumper) as is the winner of the Sergievsky–Trumper tournament.

==== Prologue ====
In 1956, a Hungarian revolutionary, Gregor Vassy, calmly explains to his 4-year-old daughter, Florence, the history of chess, before the two are separated in the midst of a violent rebellion in Budapest ("Prologue" / "The Story of Chess").

==== Act 1 ====
Decades later at an international chess tournament in Bangkok, Thailand, the wild-tempered American challenger, Freddie Trumper, arrives with his second and presumed lover: a now-adult Florence ("Freddie's Entrance"). At a press meeting, Freddie loses his temper with the reporters as Florence scolds them for their sensationalism ("Press Conference"). The current world champion, a Soviet Russian named Anatoly Sergievsky, discusses this with his second, Molokov. Afterwards, in private, Anatoly cynically reflects on how his career as world champion has been characterized by empty fame ("Where I Want to Be"). Meanwhile, Florence grows frustrated with Freddie's seedy financial agent, Walter, and complains to Freddie that her intellectual capabilities are under-appreciated ("Argument").

The opening ceremony features merchandise vendors and Walter relishing in the tournament's money-making opportunities ("Merchandisers"); the American and Soviet delegates each vowing their side will win ("Diplomats"); and the beginning of the tournament's first round ("Chess #1"). When Anatoly begins eating yogurt during the match, Freddie accuses him of cheating before storming out of the arena, leaving Florence to negotiate with the tournament's Arbiter, Molokov, and Anatoly, eventually promising to retrieve Freddie ("Quartet"). Florence later scolds Freddie, and they fight about the tournament's politics until he viciously turns the argument toward her missing father ("The American and Florence"); alone, Florence begins to realize her need to abandon Freddie ("Someone Else's Story").

Instead of heading off to the Generous Sole restaurant for the reconciliatory meeting Florence has scheduled between Freddie and Anatoly, Freddie is sidetracked by the Bangkok nightlife ("One Night in Bangkok"), leaving Anatoly and Florence awkwardly alone together; however, they eventually embrace as romantic feelings arise before being finally interrupted by Freddie ("Terrace Duet" / "Who'd Ever Think It?"). Anatoly apologizes for the yogurt incident and Freddie returns to the match, but only after a hefty bribe. Distracted by the loss of Florence's love, however, Freddie flounders, finishing the most recent round with one win and five losses; one more loss will cost him the match (Chess #2). Furious, he blames his issues on Florence, who finally leaves him as he reflects on his stature ("Florence Quits" / "A Taste of Pity"). Florence contemplates her new freedom from Freddie ("Nobody's Side"), while Walter secretly arranges for Anatoly to defect from the Soviet Union to the United States. When a mob of reporters ambush Anatoly and ask about his newfound relationship with Florence and why he is deserting his country ("Reporters"), he tells them that he will never truly leave his homeland ("Anthem").

==== Act 2 ====
Eight weeks later, everyone is in Budapest to witness the conclusion of the match between Anatoly and Freddie ("The Arbiter" / "Hungarian Folk Song"). Florence is elated to be back in her hometown, but dismayed that she remembers none of it ("Heaven Help My Heart"). Molokov offers to help her find her missing father and starts "investigating". Freddie, under protestations from Walter, is confident that he will win ("Winning"). Florence and Anatoly are now openly lovers, though their relationship is complicated by the arrival of Svetlana, Anatoly's estranged wife, in Budapest ("You and I"). Anatoly discovers that Molokov is threatening his brother's family to get him to return to Russia and begins to break down, losing a string of matches and leaving the score tied at five games all ("Freddie Goes Metal"). Molokov and Walter, interested in exchanging key individuals for their respective countries, collaborate to achieve their separate goals ("Let's Work Together"), and Molokov reveals to Walter that Florence's father is alive in Budapest, who in turn reveals this to Florence. Pressured by this information and the strain on her relationship with Anatoly, Florence turns to Svetlana for solace ("I Know Him So Well"). Anatoly, having heard the news of Florence's father, cannot focus on the match at hand, and so Florence asks Freddie for a postponement, but he refuses and breaks down on live television, reflecting how his broken childhood made him who he is today ("Pity the Child"). In the meantime, Molokov brings Florence to see a man claiming to be her father and the two joyously reconnect ("Father's Lullaby").

In the deciding game of the match, Anatoly resolves to ensure that Florence is reunited with her father. He thus chooses to recant his defection and makes a tactical error during the game. Freddie immediately takes advantage of the blunder and proceeds to win the tournament, becoming the new world champion ("Endgame"). Florence and Anatoly reflect on the conclusion of their romance ("You and I: Reprise").

==== Epilogue ====
Florence is left alone to wait for her father when she is approached by Walter, who confesses that the old man is not her father, who is most likely dead. It seems that Molokov struck a deal with Walter that if the Russians managed to get Anatoly back, they would release a captured American spy; using Florence, they succeeded. Florence has now left Freddie, been abandoned by Anatoly, and lost the father she never had, realising that she too has been used, and she sadly mirrors Anatoly's earlier sentiment that her only borders lie around her heart ("Anthem: Reprise").

=== Original Broadway cast ===
- Frederick Trumper, The American – Philip Casnoff
- Florence Vassy – Judy Kuhn
- Anatoly Sergievsky, The Russian – David Carroll
- Ivan Molokov – Harry Goz
- Walter Anderson – Dennis Parlato
- Arbiter – Paul Harman
- Svetlana Sergievsky – Marcia Mitzman
- Gregor Vassy – Neal Ben-Ari
- Young Florence – Gina Gallagher
- Nikolai – Kurt Johns
- Joe and Harold (embassy officials) – Richard Muenz and Eric Johnson
- Ben – Kip Niven

=== Songs ===
Act 1

- "Prologue":
  - "The Story of Chess" – Gregor
- "Freddie's Entrance" ^{‡} ^{§} – Freddie
- "Press Conference" ^{‡} – Florence and Reporters
- "Where I Want to Be" – Anatoly
- "Argument" ^{§} – Florence and Freddie
- "Merchandisers" ^{‡} – Walter and Vendors
- "Diplomats" ^{‡} ^{§} – Molokov and Delegates
- "Chess Hymn" ^{†} – Ensemble
- "Chess #1" ^{‡} – Instrumental
- "Quartet (Model of Decorum and Tranquility)" – Molokov, Florence, Arbiter, and Anatoly
- "The American and Florence" ^{§} – Florence and Freddie
- "Someone Else's Story" – Florence
- "One Night in Bangkok" – Freddie and Ensemble
- "Terrace Duet" – Florence and Anatoly
  - "Who'd Ever Think It?" ^{‡} – Freddie
- "Chess #2" ^{‡} – Instrumental
- "Florence Quits" ^{‡} ^{§} / "A Taste of Pity" ^{‡} – Florence and Freddie / Freddie
- "Nobody's Side" – Florence
- "Reporters" ^{‡} ^{§} – Reporters
- "Anthem" – Anatoly

Act 2

- "The Arbiter" ^{‡} – The Arbiter and Reporters
- "Hungarian Folk Song" – Ensemble
- "Heaven Help My Heart" – Florence
- "Winning" ^{§} – Walter and Freddie
- "You and I":
  - "You and I" – Florence and Anatoly
  - "Where I Want to Be (Reprise)" – Svetlana
  - "You and I (Reprise)" – Anatoly and Svetlana
- "Freddie Goes Metal" ^{‡} ^{§} – Freddie
- "Let's Work Together" ^{‡} – Molokov and Walter
- "I Know Him So Well" – Florence and Svetlana
- "Pity the Child" – Freddie
- "Father's Lullaby" (Apukád erős kezén) – Gregor and Florence
- "Endgame" – Arbiter, Nikolai, Ben, Freddie, Anatoly, and Ensemble
- "You and I (Reprise)" – Florence and Anatoly
- "Finale" ^{‡} – Florence

^{†} This song appears on the Broadway cast album, but was deleted from production and is not found in the script licensed for production.
^{‡} This song features in productions, but it was not recorded for the Broadway album.
^{§} The titles here refer to the published score names of the songs. Several songs in the American version are identified by alternative titles. "Freddie's Entrance" is also called "What a Scene! What a Joy!"; "Argument" is called "How Many Women"; "Diplomats" is called "U.S. vs. U.S.S.R."; "American and Florence" is called "You Want to Lose Your Only Friend?"; "Florence Quits" is called "So You Got What You Want"; "Reporters" is called "Anatoly and the Press"; "Winning" is called "No Contest"; and "Freddie Goes Metal" is called "A Whole New Board Game".

== Revivals, concerts, and recordings ==
=== 1989: Carnegie Hall and Sweden ===
Soon after the show closed on Broadway, a concert version was performed in January 1989 at Carnegie Hall by the original cast in a sold-out benefit performance. In September 1989, during the finals of the 1989 chess World Cup tournament, the musical was performed twice in Skellefteå, Sweden, starring Judy Kuhn (Florence in the original Broadway cast), Körberg and Head (principals from the West End production company), and Anders Eljas conducting members of the Tallinn Radio Symphony Orchestra and the Skellefteå Chamber Choir.

=== 1990s ===
The seven-month-long 1990 American tour acknowledged the ending of the Cold War. The tour starred Carolee Carmello, John Herrera, and Stephen Bogardus and was staged by Des McAnuff. Playwright Robert Coe worked with McAnuff on revising the show, mostly using the Nelson script and restoring most of the original song order from the British version of the musical and deleting the new songs written for the American version. A UK tour starring Rebecca Storm and mostly based on the London production, was a bigger success.

Once the Soviet Union fell, the modernization attempts died out: A Tim Rice rewrite played a brief run off Broadway in 1992 and set the show back to 1972. In 1990, a production was staged at the Marriott Theatre in Lincolnshire, Illinois. Directed by David H. Bell and starring Susie McMonagle, David Studwell and Kim Strauss, it featured another reworking of the Nelson script.

A 1990 production in Sydney, Australia, directed by Jim Sharman, was a critical and popular success at the Theatre Royal. It used a new version of the book rewritten primarily by Rice to streamline the plot, using parts from each of the previous versions, as well as his original conception for the American version. It starred Jodie Gillies as Florence, David McLeod as Frederick, and Robbie Krupski as Anatoly, and featured John Wood as Alexander, David Whitney as Walter, Laurence Clifford as the Arbiter, and Maria Mercedes as Svetlana. The action was shifted to an international hotel in Bangkok during the chess championships. No cast recording was made of this version. Both acts took place at a single chess match in a single city (Bangkok) in the late 1980s. Florence's nationality was changed from Hungarian to Czech, with an accompanying change in the lyrics of "The American and Florence" from "Budapest is rising" to "Prague and Mr. Dubček". The shift in time also led to a considerably different atmosphere, and a line changed in "Embassy Lament" addressing the fall of the Berlin Wall. As in the British version, Anatoly defects from the Soviet Union, wins the match, then decides to return to the Soviet Union at the end, leading to the possibility that Florence's father, if he is still alive, will be released from prison. Many of the numbers from the British version were lengthened considerably, with an extended "One Night in Bangkok" near the top of the show. "Heaven Help My Heart" ended the first act, with "Anthem" and "Someone Else's Story" (sung by Svetlana with new lyrics) in the second. "The Soviet Machine" and "The Deal" were also extended considerably. A later Australian production played at the Princess Theatre, Melbourne, in 1997, with Barbara Dickson as Florence (she had sung Svetlana on the original studio cast album). Co-stars included Derek Metzger and Daryl Braithwaite.

In 1992, there was a production directed by Rob Marshall staged at Paper Mill Playhouse. The production starred Steve Blanchard as the American, Judy McLane as Florence, Keith Rice as the Russian, David Cryer as Molokov, P. J. Benjamin as Walter, John DeLuca as the Arbiter, and Susan Dawn Carson as Svetlana.

In 1994, Chess in Concert toured cities in Sweden. The songs and lyrics were largely identical to the original album, with the addition of "Someone Else's Story" from the American version and "The Soviet Machine" from the British version. The cast included Anders Glenmark as Frederick, Karin Glenmark as Florence, and Tommy Körberg reprising his role from previous productions as Anatoly. A concert performance at Eriksbergshallen in Gothenburg was recorded.

In 1995, a Los Angeles production at Hollywood's Hudson Theater received critical praise. It starred Douglas Sills as Freddie, Marcia Mitzman (who played Svetlana in the first Broadway production) as Florence and Sean Smith as Anatoly. For their performances both Mitzman and Smith won an Ovation Award and a Los Angeles Drama Critics Circle Award. Chess toured in the UK in 1996. The cast included Jacqui Scott, and "Nobody's Side" was used as the finale.

In 1996-1997 elements of Chess were incorporated in the Russian Mossovet Theatre musical "Igra", along with other songs of Björn Ulvaeus and Benny Andersson, The Beatles, and other hits of 1960-80s. Russian lyrics were penned by Yaroslav Kesler, who also worked on Mossovet's staging of Jesus Christ Superstar. "Igra" in general was presented as follow up to the famous rock-opera and featured mostly same group of artists and producers, but survived just one season.

=== 2000 to 2009 ===
A Danish tour began in 2001. The English-language version starred mostly British principals, directed by Craig Revel Horwood. A two-CD album was released, titled Chess: Complete Cast Album, the only major complete recording of the British version of the musical (plus the addition of the American version's "Someone Else's Story" for Svetlana in Act 2). The production also followed the British version of the plot, though later performances used a much shorter, trimmed-down version closer to the original concept album. The cast included Zubin Varla as Frederick, Emma Kershaw as Florence, Stig Rossen as Anatoly, Simon Clark as Alexander, and James Graeme as Walter, Gunilla Backman as Svetlana, and Michael Cormick as the Arbiter.

A 2002 Swedish-language version, Chess på svenska, with lyrics and book by Björn Ulvaeus, Lars Rudolffson, and Jan Mark, attempted to streamline the story back to its original form and eliminate political aspects. It featured new musical numbers (Svetlana's "Han är en man, han är ett barn" ("He is a man, he is a child") and Molokov's "Glöm mig om du kan" ("Forget me if you can" from the demo song "When The Waves Roll Out to Sea")) and focused on material from the concept album. Cast members included Tommy Körberg, reprising his role as Anatolij, Helen Sjöholm as Florence, Josefin Nilsson as Svetlana, Anders Ekborg as Freddie and Per Myrberg as Alexander. It was filmed for Swedish television, and has been released on a Swedish-language DVD. It was nominated for eight national Swedish Theatre Awards Guldmasken, winning six, including Best Leading Actress (Sjöholm), Best Leading Actor (Körberg), and Best Stage Design (Robin Wagner). The cast CD "Chess På Svenska" peaked at number 2 on the Swedish album chart.

An Actors Fund of America Benefit Concert was given in 2003 in the New Amsterdam Theater on Broadway. It was produced without set or costume changes, and with the orchestra onstage. The show was a combination of both the American and British versions, mostly following the British version with regard to music but the American version with regard to the plot, though the American version's subplot with Florence's father was cut. Act 1 was set in Merano, and Act 2 was set in Bangkok, like in the British version. The show, which was recorded, was directed by Peter Flynn, choreographed by Christopher Gattelli and conducted by Seth Rudetsky. The cast included Adam Pascal as Frederick, Julia Murney as Florence, a young 22 year old Josh Groban as Anatoly, Norm Lewis as Molokov, Jonathan Dokuchitz as Walter, Raúl Esparza as the Arbiter, and Sutton Foster as Svetlana.

The Estonian production premiered in 2006 at the theatre Vanemuine in Tartu. The cast included Koit Toome and Gerli Padar as Freddie and Florence, respectively.

A concert version was presented in 2007 at the Ford Amphitheatre, Los Angeles, California, mixing the British and American versions. The cast included Susan Egan as Svetlana, Kevin Earley as Anatoly, Ty Taylor as Freddie, Cindy Robinson as Florence, Thomas Griffith as Alexander, and Matthew Morrison as the Arbiter. The concert was directed by Brian Michael Purcell. A portion of the proceeds went to Broadway Cares/Equity Fights AIDS. A German-language version premiered in 2008 at Staatsoperette Dresden. It ran two seasons until 2010.

In 2008, Heartaches and Warner Bros. Records produced a two-performance concert version of Chess in Concert together with the City of London Philharmonic Orchestra, directed by Hugh Wooldridge at the Royal Albert Hall. This version, adapted by Tim Rice and Hugh Wooldridge with some new lyrics, including almost no dialogue, and substantially following the British version in plot and music, was recorded and released as a 2-CD cast album and DVD, both titled Chess in Concert. It was also broadcast on American PBS channels in June 2009. Tim Rice stated in the concert's programme that this version of Chess is the "official version", after years of different plot and song combinations. Though the plot and score is almost entirely based on that of the British version, this version also adds in two American-originated songs: "Prologue" and "Someone Else's Story". The cast included Adam Pascal reprising his role as Frederick, Idina Menzel as Florence, Josh Groban, who was then 27 years old at the time of the show, reprising his role as Anatoly, Kerry Ellis as Svetlana, Marti Pellow as the Arbiter, David Bedella as Molokov, and Clarke Peters as Walter. The Civil Servants (in "Embassy Lament") were sung by Cantabile

In 2009, the first official Italian production (in Italian language) took place in Firenze, then replicated in Prato (2010), Campi Bisenzio-FI (2011), and Siena (2011). The cast included Alberto Putignano/Emanuele Nardoni as Frederick, Irene Vavolo/Alessandra D'Onofrio as Florence, Piercarlo Ballo as Anatoly, Ilaria Bongini/Giulia Gazzeri as Svetlana, Riccardo Andreoni as the Arbiter, Maurizio Capuana as Molokov, and Matteo Gazzeri/Marco Davide Toci as Walter. Direction by Piercarlo Ballo.

=== 2010 to 2019 ===
A Hungarian revival of Chess ran in 2010 in Budapest. This concert production closely followed the script of the Royal Albert Hall production of 2008, though the songs "Hymn of Chess", "The Merchandisers", "The Arbiter" (reprise) and "Talking Chess" were cut. It was produced by PS Produkció and directed by Cornelius Baltus. The Hungarian lyrics were written by Ágnes Romhányi and the choreographer was Karen Bruce.

The first major American revival of Chess since 1993 ran at the Signature Theatre in Arlington, Virginia in 2010. The show followed the story of the American version, though it streamlined the book and reordered some of the songs. It was directed by Eric D. Schaeffer. The cast included Jeremy Kushnier as Freddie, Euan Morton as Anatoly, and Jill Paice as Florence.

A production directed by Craig Revel Horwood toured for 10 months in the UK, Italy and Ireland in 2010–2011. It was an actor-musician production, with 25 out of the 30 cast members playing instruments. Changes to the libretto included the removal of "Merano" and "Walter and Florence". The cast included James Fox as Frederick, Shona White as Florence, Daniel Koek as Anatoly, Steve Varnom as Alexander, James Graeme as Walter, David Erik as the Arbiter, and Poppy Tierney as Svetlana. Mirvish Productions staged a Toronto run in 2011 at the Princess of Wales Theatre, following the UK tour, using most of the UK Tour cast with Tam Mutu taking over the role of Anatoly and Rebecca Lock as Svetlana.

Another German version (with the songs performed in English) was produced by the Theater Bielefeld (Municipal Theatre Bielefeld) in Bielefeld, Germany in 2011–2012.

A one-night concert was given at Lincoln Center, in New York in 2012, billed as "Chess in Concept 2012: A benefit performance for the Actors Fund of America". The cast included Robert Cuccioli as Anatoly, Natascia Diaz as Florence, Drew Sarich as Frederick, and Tamra Hayden as Svetlana. This version returned to the original concept album for its musical structure, Tim Rice's original scenario, and incorporated virtually all of the British score. It was produced and directed, and the score was arranged, by Christopher Martin.

A New Zealand production of Chess ran in 2012, in the Regent On Broadway, directed by Steven Sayer. The show was produced by the Abbey Musical Theatre. A 2012 Melbourne, Australia production was directed by Gale Edwards and mounted by The Production Company. The cast featured Martin Crewes as Frederick, Michael Falzon as the Arbiter, Silvie Paladino as Florence, and Simon Gleeson as Anatoly, It was staged at the State Theatre, backed by Orchestra Victoria. The role of the Arbiter was expanded slightly by sharing Florence's song "Nobody's Side". The show ran for 10 performances and was nominated for twelve Green Room Awards in 2012, eventually winning seven. Chess was also nominated for two 2013 Helpmann Awards, with Paladino winning Actress in a Leading Role.

In 2012, the GöteborgsOperan (Gothenburg Opera, Sweden) ran the Swedish-language version, Chess på Svenska, under the direction of Mira Bartov. The musical ran until the Fall of 2013. The roles of Anatoly and Freddie were played by Philip Jalmelid and Christopher Wollter. Evelyn Jons played Florence and Nina Pressing played Svetlana.

East West Players staged a revival of the UK version of Chess with a multi-cultural cast in 2013 at the David Henry Hwang Theatre in Los Angeles, California, directed by Tim Dang. The production garnered a positive review from the Los Angeles Times.

A South Korean production opened in 2015, with k-pop stars Jo Kwon, CNU, Key, and Ken quadruple-cast as Anatoly.

Porchlight Music Theatre presented Chess as a part of their "Porchlight Revisits" season in which they present three forgotten musicals per year. It was in Chicago, Illinois in May 2016. It was directed by Artistic Director Michael Weber, choreographed by Brenda Didier, and music directed by Jimmy Morehead.

In 2017, a Swedish theatre group, UnderhållningsPatrullen, presented the Swedish-language version, Chess på Svenska, at the Kristianstad Theatre, with a premiere date of 23 September 2017. The production included a reduced orchestration by Anders Eljas, to introduce a new version for future productions better suited to smaller theatre venues. The roles of Anatoly, Florence, and Freddie were played by Johan Wikström, Frida Modén Treichl, and Patrik Martinsson. Hanna la Fleur performed as Svetlana, Peter Järnstedt plays Molokov, and David Rix played the Arbiter. The production was directed by Ola Hörling. The Kristianstad production ran for an expanded schedule and finally closed in December 2017 after 47 shows.

A limited-run West End revival began at the London Coliseum on 26 April 2018 through 2 June 2018, officially opening on 1 May 2018. Billed as the first revival of the show in 30 years, the production was directed by Laurence Connor, with choreography by Stephen Mear. The cast included Michael Ball as Anatoly, Phillip Browne as Molokov, Alexandra Burke as Svetlana, Cedric Neal as the Arbiter, Tim Howar as Freddie and Cassidy Janson as Florence. Described as a new interpretation of the original concept album, the production kept the first act in Merano and the second in Bangkok, and included all songs from the concept album (including "Argument"), along with the popular "Someone Else's Story", removed the character of Walter entirely, and dropped the final twist of Florence's father never having been found after all, instead ending on the bittersweet parting of Florence and Anatoly amidst the triumphant crescendo of You And I.

After a table reading, a revival of the musical with a restructured storyline penned by Danny Strong was directed by Michael Mayer. The production had a pre-Broadway tryout in the Eisenhower Theater at the Kennedy Center from 14 to 18 February 2018. The cast included Raúl Esparza as Freddie, Ramin Karimloo as Anatoly, Karen Olivo as Florence, Ruthie Ann Miles as Svetlana, Bradley Dean as Molokov, Sean Allan Krill as Walter de Courcey, and Bryce Pinkham as the Arbiter. This production, though keeping much of the original plot of the 1986 West End production, expanded on it significantly. Each act had a political background: Act One, set in 1979, centered on negotiations for the SALT-II treaty, and Act Two, set four years later, centered on suspicions surrounding the Able Archer 83 exercises. Walter no longer had a cover and was openly a CIA agent. Freddie was portrayed as having paranoid schizophrenia, and the show ended with Florence's father being released.

=== 2020 to present ===
Chess played at the Umeda Arts Theater Main Hall in Osaka, Japan (25–28 January 2020) and at the Tokyo International Forum Hall C in Tokyo (1–9 February). Ramin Karimloo played Anatoly with Samantha Barks as Florence, Luke Walsh as Freddie, Takanori Sato as the Arbiter, Eliana as Svetlana, and Hideya Masuhara as Molokov. The ensemble included Megumi Iino, Hiroaki Ito, Takashi Otsuka, Kana Okamoto, Naoki Shibahara, Tatsunori Senna, Kota Someya, Tomohiko Nakai, Nanaka, Ai Ninomiya, Ami Norimatsu, Maaya Harada, Kan Muto, Daisuke Moriyama, Sayaka Watabiki, and Kiyoka Wada. The show was directed and choreographed by Nick Winston. In February 2020, Oslo's Folkteateret began previews for a new production based on Chess på svenska. This was put on hold due to the COVID-19 pandemic, and finally opened on 24 August 2022. It starred André Søfteland as Anatolij, Espen Grjotheim as Freddie, Karoline Krüger as Florence, Marion Ravn as Svetlana, Øystein Røger as Molokov, and Elisabeth Andreassen as the Arbiter. On 7 July 2022, the production released a cast album.

On 17 October 2020, the first Russian production of Chess premiered at the MDM Theatre in Moscow. It was produced by Dmitriy Bogachov, the former head of Stage Entertainment Russia, founder of Moscow Broadway, and member of The Broadway League. The opening had been scheduled for 10 October, but was moved a week later. The cast included Aleksandr Sukhanov and Kirill Gordeev as Anatoly, Anastasia Stotskaya, Olga Belyaeva, and Yulia Iva as Florence, the Aleksandrs, Aleksandr Kazmin and Aleksandr Bobrov as Freddie, Anna Guchenkova and Yulia Iva as Svetlana, Stanislav Belyaev and Denis Demkiv as the Arbiter, and the two Aleksandrs, Aleksandr Marakulin, Aleksandr Matrosov, and Andrey Shkoldychenko as Molokov. The lyrics were translated by Aleksei Ivaschenko (Nord-Ost, Russian versions of The Phantom of the Opera, The Sound of Music). The show was mostly based on the West End version, but took many cues from the original concept album. The prologue is set in Moscow, as in the Swedish version, and the rest of the show is set in Merano (Act I) and Bangkok (Act II). Walter was omitted and the songs "Merchandisers", "Florence and Molokov", "Anatoly and the Press", "One More Opponent", "Talking Chess" and "Finale" were removed. The song "Argument" was included. The chess games played on stage are actual historical chess games: Karpov-Korchnoi (1978) and Spassky-Fischer (1972) in Act I, and Karjakin-Caruana (2016) in Act II. Starting 7 April 2020, the omitted song "Merchandisers" was performed by the chorus in the theater lobby during intermission. The production closed on 16 October 2022, running for over 600 performances, making it the second-longest running professional production of the show, after only the original London production.

A semi-staged concert hall production toured Melbourne, Perth, Adelaide and Brisbane from April to June 2021. A cut-down version of the general plot of the original London version, changes included the movement of "Someone Else's Story" back to Act One and "I Know Him So Well" before "The Deal". It was accompanied by a 26 piece orchestra and 40 person choir. According to the musical director's notes in the program, they tried to stay faithful to the sound, feel and spirit of the concept album, sourcing original keyboard and drum sounds. Although "semi-staged", it had a small set consisting of a chess board with large pieces representing towns where the tournaments were held, and a dance ensemble, elaborate choreography and lighting.

A two-day concert based mostly on the London version was held at the Theatre Royal, Drury Lane on 1 and 2 August 2022. The show starred Samantha Barks as Florence, Hadley Fraser as Anatoly, Joel Harper-Jackson as Freddie, Frances Mayli McCann as Svetlana, Ako Mitchell as the Arbiter, and Craige Els as Molokov. The show largely followed the plot of the London version, but cut several songs and added "Someone Else's Story" before "Embassy Lament".

On 12 December 2022, a one-night benefit concert for the Entertainment Community Fund played at the Broadhurst Theatre. Ramin Karimloo reprised his role as Anatoly, joined by Darren Criss as Freddie, Lena Hall as Florence, and Solea Pfeiffer as Svetlana. Bradley Dean, Bryce Pinkham, and Sean Allan Krill reprised their roles of Molokov, The Arbiter, and Walter, respectively. The script used was a revised version of the Kennedy Center book, mostly expanding on Freddie and Anatoly. Anatoly's dissatisfaction with life in the Soviet Union was heightened to contemplating suicide and increased suspicion of Svetlana, and Freddie's schizophrenia was changed to undiagnosed bipolar disorder. A plot point was also added where Florence and Anatoly had already met and had a brief affair at a previous tournament in Rome.

The Muny Opera Theatre in St. Louis staged Chess as part of their 105th season from 5 to 11 July 2023. The cast featured Jessica Vosk as Florence, Jarrod Spector as Freddie, John Riddle as Anatoly, Taylor Louderman as Svetlana, Rodney Hicks as Walter, Tally Sessions as Molokov, and Phillip Johnson Richardson as the Arbiter. The production was directed and choreographed by Josh Rhodes. The production stuck mostly to the plot of the original London version, but moved several songs around and added some new dialogue scenes. The production was sponsored by the Saint Louis Chess Club and the World Chess Hall of Fame, both located close to the theatre.

In 2025 the Stadttheater Baden near Vienna, Austria staged Chess featuring Drew Sarich as Frederick Trumper, Mark Seibert as Anatoly, Femke Soetenga as Florence, and Ann Mandrella as Svetlana. It was directed by Andreas Gergen. In the fall of 2025, Det Ny Teater staged the musical, featuring Thomas Høj Falkenberg as Anatoly, Xenia Lach-Nielsen as Florence, Anders Gjesing as Freddie, Søren Bech-Madsen as Molokov, Frederikke Vedel as Svetlana, Simon Nøiers as the Arbiter, and Jon Lange as Walter.

=== Broadway revival (2025-2026) ===
Chess had its first Broadway revival in 2025, starring Aaron Tveit as Freddie, Lea Michele as Florence, and Nicholas Christopher as Anatoly. The cast also features Hannah Cruz as Svetlana, as well as Bradley Dean, Sean Allan Krill, and Bryce Pinkham reprising their roles of Molokov, Walter, and the Arbiter from the earlier Kennedy Center and Broadhurst Theatre concerts. It was directed by Michael Mayer and featured a new book by Danny Strong, following the aforementioned concert versions of the show presented by the same creative team in 2018 at the Kennedy Center and in 2022 at the Broadhurst Theatre. The Tony Awards Administration Committee held that the new book was eligible for a Tony Award for the Best Book of a Musical. Strong has stated that his new book puts greater emphasis on Florence and Svetlana as women with agency. The new book also explicitly incorporates historical events and incidents of the Cold War, pairing the Act I finale with the real-life SALT II discussions and the Act II finale with the Able Archer 83 exercises. Strong drew from prior iterations of Chess but did not consult the book of the 1988 Broadway version. The overarching plot roughly follows the West End and concept album versions, with Act I set in Merano and Act II set in Bangkok.

Chess began previews at the Imperial Theatre on October 15, 2025 and opened on November 16, 2025. The production has recorded a cast album which released on Friday, April 10, 2026. The production was nominated for a Drama League Award for Outstanding Revival of a Musical. The show was on a limited run that had been extended through September 13, 2026. Additionally, it was announced that Joanna "JoJo" Levesque would replace Michele in late June 2026; however, it was later announced that the show would close entirely on Michele's original scheduled departure date, closing on June 21, 2026. The show played 34 previews and 241 total performances.

==== Songs ====
Act 1

- "Difficult and Dangerous Times" - The Arbiter and Ensemble
- "Where I Want To Be" - Anatoly and Ensemble
- "Pity The Child #1" - Freddie
- "Merano" - The Arbiter and Ensemble
- "What A Scene/What A Joy" - Freddie and Ensemble
- "Press Conference" - Freddie, Florence and Ensemble
- "The Arbiter" - The Arbiter and Ensemble
- "Quartet (A Model of Decorum and Tranquillity)" - Molokov, Florence, The Arbiter and Anatoly
- "1956, Budapest is Rising" - Florence, Freddie and Ensemble
- "Nobody's Side" - Florence and Ensemble
- "Mountain Duet" - Florence, Anatoly and Freddie
- "Florence Quits" - Freddie and Florence
- "Pity The Child #2" - Freddie
- "Heaven Help My Heart" - Florence
- "Anatoly and The Press" - Ensemble
- "Anthem" - Anatoly and Ensemble

Act 2

- "One Night In Bangkok" - Freddie and Ensemble
- "He is a Man, He is a Child" - Svetlana
- "The Soviet Machine" - Molokov and Ensemble
- "The Interview" - Freddie and Anatoly
- "You and I" - Florence and Anatoly
- "The Deal (Part 1)" - The Arbiter, Svetlana, Anatoly and Ensemble
- "The Deal (Part 2)" - Freddie, Walter, Molokov, Anatoly, Florence, Svetlana, The Arbiter and Ensemble
- "Pity The Child" - Freddie and Ensemble
- "I Know Him So Well" - Florence and Svetlana
- "Endgame (Part 1)" - Ensemble
- "Endgame (Part 2)" - Molokov, Walter, Florence, Svetlana, Anatoly, Freddie, The Arbiter and Ensemble
- "Someone Else's Story" - Florence
- "You and I (Reprise)" - Anatoly and Florence
- "Epilogue" - The Arbiter

== Principal roles and casting history ==
| Character | West End | Broadway | US National Tour | UK National Tour | West End Revival | Broadway Revival |
| Character | 1986 | 1988 | 1990 | | 2018 | 2025 |
|---|---|---|---|---|---|---|
| Anatoly Sergievsky | Tommy Körberg | David Carroll | John Herrera | Maurice Clarke | Michael Ball | Nicholas Christopher |
| Florence Vassy | Elaine Paige | Judy Kuhn | Carolee Carmello | Rebecca Storm | Cassidy Janson | Lea Michele |
| Freddie Trumper | Murray Head | Philip Casnoff | Stephen Bogardus | Richard Barnes | Tim Howar | Aaron Tveit |
| Molokov | John Turner | Harry Goz | David Hurst | Malcolm Rivers | Phillip Browne | Bradley Dean |
| Svetlana Sergievsky | Siobhán McCarthy | Marcia Mitzman | Barbara Walsh | Linda-Mae Brewer | Alexandra Burke | Hannah Cruz |
| Walter | Kevin Colson | Dennis Parlato | Gregory Jbara | Paul Haley | | Sean Allan Krill |
| The Arbiter | Tom Jobe | Paul Harman | Ken Ard | Brett Forest | Cedric Neal | Bryce Pinkham |

=== Cast replacements ===
==== West End (1986-89) ====
- Anatoly: David Burt
- Florence: Siobhán McCarthy
- Freddie: Anthony Head, Peter Karrie
- Molokov: Kevin Colson, Eric Flynn
- Walter: Eric Flynn, John Turner

== Main characters ==
| Character | Voice type | Description |
| Anatoly Sergievsky | Baritone, F_{2}–B♭_{4} | "The Russian": The champion from Soviet Russia—a troubled husband (and father, in the British and Swedish versions) who despises the propaganda and politics of the tournament, eventually deciding to defect from his homeland, even at the cost of deserting his family. |
| Freddie Trumper | Tenor, B♭_{2}–D♭_{5} | "The American": The champion from the United States—a self-absorbed, short-tempered, Russophobic bad boy, who either matures and aids Anatoly a year after his own defeat (in the British version), or remains selfish and wins the tournament (in the first American version). In the revised 2025 script, he is established to have bipolar disorder with psychosis, which strains his relationship with Florence. |
| Florence Vassy | Mezzo-Soprano, E♭_{3}–E_{5} | Freddie's strong-willed second and paramour, who was separated from her presumably captured or killed father during the Hungarian Revolution of 1956; Florence feels strained by Freddie's brashness and falls in love with Anatoly, eventually becoming his mistress. |
| Svetlana Sergievsky | Alto, F_{3}–E♭_{5} | Anatoly's estranged wife who, under Molokov's machinations, tries to persuade Anatoly to return to his homeland and family; although upset at Anatoly's betrayal, she also understands that Florence has given Anatoly something she cannot herself. |
| Molokov | Bass-Baritone, F♯_{2}–G_{4} | Anatoly's conniving second who is apparently also a manipulative KGB agent; his first name is given as "Alexander" in the British, revised American, and Australian versions and as "Ivan" in the first American version. He has a pre-existing working relationship with Walter. |
| Walter | Varies (Note: Walter has typically been cast with baritones, but in the Broadway version he sings parts which demand a higher range, closer to Freddie's.) | A financial administrator in Freddie's delegation and seemingly a secret CIA agent; his surname is given as "de Courcey" in the British and Australian versions, and as "Anderson" in the American version. Absent in the concept album. In the revised 2018 script, Walter has no "cover" and is overtly a CIA agent. He is also the only principal character without a solo number, which is referenced by The Arbiter in the 2025 Broadway revival. |
| The Arbiter | Tenor, B_{2}–A_{4} | The coldly objective, no-nonsense referee of the championship tournament and also (in the British version and its spinoffs) the president of the International Chess Federation. In the revised 2018 script, this role is expanded as a narrator who "becomes" the arbiter during two chess matches. |

== Possible film adaptation ==
Tim Rice has always expressed his desire of adapting Chess for the big screen. In 2003, Kylie Minogue was in talks to play one of the two female parts. She met with Rice in Paris to discuss the script. Jude Law and Brendan Gleeson were discussed as male leads.

On 10 January 2022, on his podcast "Get Onto My Cloud", Rice stated that in addition to a possible Broadway revival happening soon, he hopes for a film adaptation to follow suit, in part bolstered by the recent success of the chess-focused Netflix miniseries The Queen's Gambit.

== Awards and nominations ==
=== Original West End production ===
| Year | Award ceremony | Category | Nominee | Result |
|---|---|---|---|---|
| 1986 | Laurence Olivier Award | Best New Musical | | Nominated |
| 1986 | Laurence Olivier Award | Best Performance by a Leading Actress in a Musical | Elaine Paige | Nominated |
| 1986 | Laurence Olivier Award | Best Performance by a Leading Actor in a Musical | Tommy Körberg | Nominated |

=== Original Broadway production ===
| Year | Award ceremony | Category | Nominee | Result |
|---|---|---|---|---|
| 1988 | Tony Award | Best Performance by a Leading Actor in a Musical | David Carroll | Nominated |
| 1988 | Tony Award | Best Performance by a Leading Actress in a Musical | Judy Kuhn | Nominated |
| 1988 | Drama Desk Award | Outstanding Actor in a Musical | David Carroll | Nominated |
| 1988 | Drama Desk Award | Outstanding Actress in a Musical | Judy Kuhn | Nominated |
| 1988 | Drama Desk Award | Outstanding Featured Actor in a Musical | Harry Goz | Nominated |
| 1988 | Drama Desk Award | Outstanding Music | Björn Ulvaeus and Benny Andersson | Nominated |
| 1988 | Drama Desk Award | Outstanding Lighting Design | David Hersey | Nominated |
| 1988 | Theatre World Award | | Philip Casnoff | Won |

=== 2025 Broadway revival ===
| Year | Award | Category | Work | Result | Ref. |
|---|---|---|---|---|---|
| 2026 | Drama League Awards | Outstanding Revival of a Musical | | Nominated | |
| 2026 | Drama League Awards | Distinguished Performance | Lea Michele | Nominated | |
| 2026 | Drama League Awards | Distinguished Performance | Nicholas Christopher | Nominated | |
| 2026 | Outer Critics Circle Award | Outstanding Lead Performer in a Broadway Musical | Nicholas Christopher | Nominated | |
| 2026 | Outer Critics Circle Award | Outstanding Revival of a Musical | | Nominated | |
| 2026 | Drama Desk Awards | Outstanding Revival of a Musical | | Nominated | |
| 2026 | Drama Desk Awards | Outstanding Lead Performance in a Musical | Nicholas Christopher | Nominated | |
| 2026 | Tony Awards | Best Performance by a Leading Actor in a Musical | Nicholas Christopher | Nominated | |
| 2026 | Tony Awards | Best Performance by a Featured Actor in a Musical | Bryce Pinkham | Nominated | |
| 2026 | Tony Awards | Best Performance by a Featured Actress in a Musical | Hannah Cruz | Nominated | |
| 2026 | Tony Awards | Best Orchestrations | Brian Usifer | Nominated | |
| 2026 | Tony Awards | Best Lighting Design of a Musical | Kevin Adams | Nominated | |
| 2026 | Dorian Award | Outstanding Broadway Musical Revival | | Nominated | |
| 2026 | Dorian Award | Outstanding Lead Performance in a Broadway Musical | Nicholas Christopher | Nominated | |
| 2026 | Dorian Award | Broadway Showstopper Award | "Anthem", Nicholas Christopher | Nominated | |
