= Dmitry Bogachev =

Russian theatre producer (born 1969)

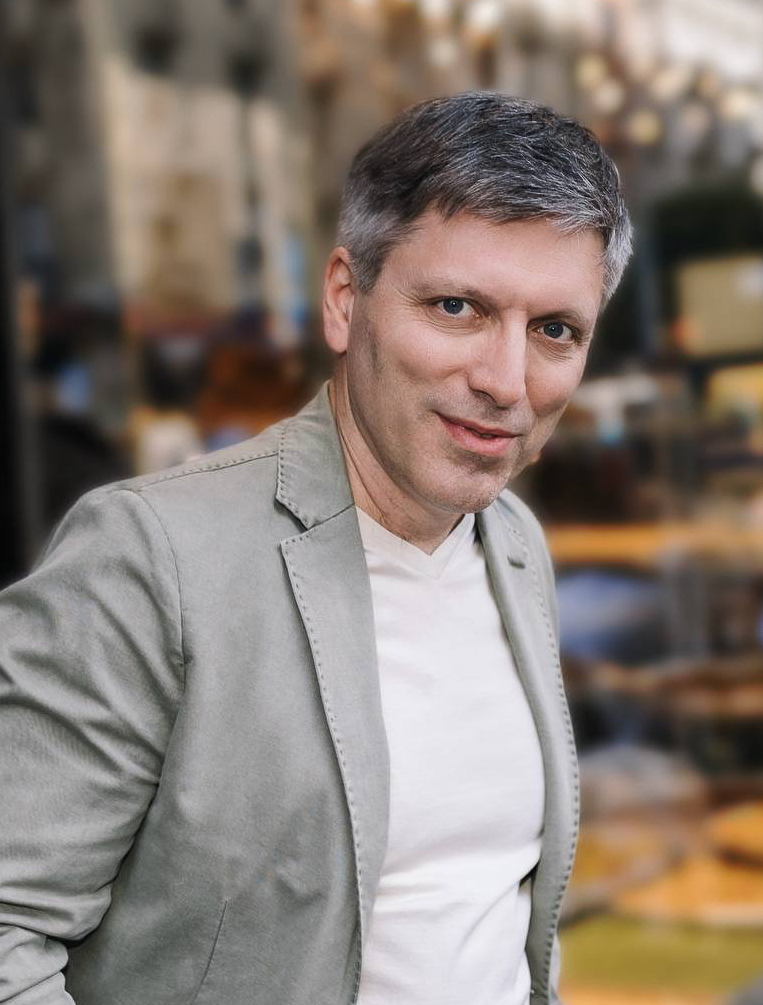
- Bogachev in 2024
- Born: April 11, 1969 (age 57); Minsk, Belarus
- Education: Moscow Engineering Physics Institute
- Occupation: Theatre producer
- Years active: 1997–present
- Website: stellar-theatre.com

Dmitry Bogachev (born April 11, 1969 in Minsk), a theatre producer and the founder of Broadway Moscow, an independent theatre production company. From 2004 to 2017, he founded and ran Stage Entertainment's Russian subsidiary. He is a member of The Broadway League and serves on the board of Broadway Dreams, a US nonprofit specialising in musical-theatre training and mentorship. He won the Golden Mask in 2014, and he was named Person of the Year 2015 in the Culture category.

== Education ==
- 1985 — Diploma with distinction in music
- 1995 — Moscow Engineering Physics Institute — Master's degree in physics
- 2002 — The British Council, Soros Foundation and Ford Foundation — Diploma in theater management

== Career ==
1994–1997 — Junior scientist of The Lab of Electronic Microscopy and Structure Investigations, the Russian Scientific Center Kurchatov Institute.

1997–2000 — Producer, CEO of IVC producing and recording company.

1998–2000 — executive producer of a popular music project "Songs Of Our Century". Music albums released under the label ranked at the top positions in national sales charts. "Songs of our century" tours covered the territories of Russia, Europe, Israel, USA and Canada.

2000–2002 — worked as a member of the producing team on Nord-Ost the Musical. As commercial director created and implemented the unique marketing strategy and commercial plan for the first Russian musical to run daily, Nord-Ost.

2001–2003 — was one of the initiators and pioneers of the development and implementation of computerized ticketing in Russia

2003 — founded and headed the production company "Russian Musical", which produced musical "12 chairs". The stage version ran in Moscow for a year; a touring version performed in St. Petersburg.

November 2004 — Founded Stage Entertainment Russia — subsidiary of the largest theatre company Stage Entertainment. Since then under the leadership of Dmitry Bogachev as Managing Director and producer, Stage Entertainment Russia has produced many successful musicals and ice-skating musicals, which have been visited by over 10 million people. Since 2005, Stage Entertainment Russia has been producing world-famous musical productions at MDM Theatre.

2011 — Dmitry Bogachev conceived Anastasia the musical based on the 1997 animated feature of 1997 and the 20th Century Fox motion picture of 1956, as well as historical events and documents. Being the author of original idea of stage musical Anastasia, he developed the creative concept and invited the composer Stephen Flaherty, the lyricist Lynn Ahrens and the playwright Terrence McNally to create a musical play. The first readings of the play took place at the New 42nd Street Studios on Broadway in July, 2012. The cast of the readings included Angela Lansbury, Aaron Tveit, Kelli Barrett, Patrick Page, Aaron Lazar and Julie Hamilton.

2012 — under the leadership of Dmitry Bogachev Stage Entertainment Russia transformed the largest Russian cinema venue Pushkinskiy, located in the heart of Moscow into a musical theater, reinstating its historical name Rossiya Theatre. Since then Stage Entertainment became the largest theater company in Russia, its musical productions presented 8 times a week at two theaters — Rossiya and MDM.

2012 — Dmitry Bogachev started a new non-profit project "Moscow Broadway" — an educational program aiming to develop the genre of musical theatre in Russia; support creative and administrative theater professionals in acquisition of global experience in the genre of musical theatre from their foreign colleagues; provide artists with the opportunities to participate in creative workshops by leading Broadway directors, actors, choreographers; organize seminars and round tables dedicated to exploring the issues in Russian and international musical theater.

2014 — the MDM Theatre was renovated during the preparation for mounting The Phantom of the Opera. The number of seats increased to 1830, which made MDM into Moscow’s highest capacity modern theatre of European level.

2014 — Dmitry Bogachev became the first international member of the Broadway League.

According to the official RBC rating in 2015, Stage Entertainment Russia under Dmitry Bogachev’s management became the box office leader in the entertainment industry in Russia.

2015 — Dmitry Bogachev became the initiator and creator of the Musical Theatre Walk of Fame on Pushkin Square in Moscow. The Musical Theatre Walk of Fame was unveiled on September 6, 2015 during a gala concert "Moscow Broadway"

2016 — An open lecture of a legendary Broadway director Harold Prince took place as part of Broadway Moscow educational program for Russian theatre community. In addition, a non-profit organisation The Broadway Dreams Foundation held the creative 10-day workshop "Broadway Dreams", culminating in a concert-revue, performed by more than 100 professional and novice Russian and American artists.

May 2016 — the World Premiere of Anastasia at Hartford Stages, Hartford, Connecticut.

April 2017 — the Broadway Premiere of Anastasia at Broadhurst, New York, New York.

2018 — The company of Dmitry Bogachev gets the new name — Broadway Moscow Ltd. MDM Theatre and Fancy Show LLC become key partners of Broadway Moscow. In August 2018 Moscow Broadway theatre company moves its headquarters and productions to the MDM Theatre. In October 2018 Broadway Moscow theatre company presented The Play That Goes Wrong — the first straight play in history of Russian theatre to run on a daily basis.

September 24, 2019 — premiere of the original Russian production of the Broadway musical First Date took place in a site-specific format, which is unusual for Russian musical theater.

October 5, 2019 — premiere of the play The Comedy About a Bank Robbery, another comedy hit by Mischief Theatre, took place.

September 19, 2020 — Lover's Day musical opened in the MDM Parquet Hall, commissioned by Dmitry Bogachev, specially for the Broadway Moscow theatre company.

October 17, 2020 — the MDM Theatre hosted the premiere of the original Russian production of the legendary musical Chess. The show played 600 performances and was seen by more than 700 000 spectators. The production won 3 Golden Mask awards.

December 3, 2022 — New original musical Fear Nothing, I’m With You, based on hit songs by rock band "Secret" premiered in MDM Theatre. It grossed approximately 4 billion rubles and set a Russian theatre attendance record – over 1 million viewers.

2023 – MDM opens a second theater – "Maska" (Mask). From this point on, musicals by the Broadway Moscow theater company are staged simultaneously in two theaters. The parody musical Mamma Mimo! premieres in December.

2024 – Premiere of the musical comedy Elementary, Hudson! The Case of Dog B. at the "Maska" theatre; premiere of the musical The Last Tale in the MDM Grand Hall.

2024 — Premiered the large-scale original musical "The Last Tale". By the time of its first public performance, nearly 100,000 tickets had been sold — a record for Russian theatre.

2025 — Together with Kenny Wax and Julia Gómez Cora, co-produced the Barcelona leg of the international tour of "SIX" at Teatre Coliseum.

2025 — Presented a new version of "The First Date", created specifically for Chinese audiences, in Beijing and Harbin. Both that production and "Lover's Day" were later adapted for Maska Theatre's main stage.

2026 — Brought "Fear Nothing, I’m With You" back to MDM Theatre following tens of thousands of requests from audiences.

2026 — Joined the board of Broadway Dreams Foundation, a US nonprofit specialising in musical-theatre training and mentorship.

2026 — Produced "The Phantom of the Musical, or What's Wrong This Time?", the first sequel in the history of Russian musical theatre and a follow-up to "MAMMA MIMO!". It opened at Theatre on Tsvetnoy on 20 August, making it Broadway Moscow's third permanent venue.

2026 — Together with Julia Gómez Cora, co-produced the first Spanish-language production of "SIX" in partnership with Kenny Wax. It opened at Teatro Gran Vía in Madrid on 17 September.

== Productions ==
2001–2002 — Nord-Ost (musical)

2003–2004 — The Twelve Chairs (musical)

2005–2006 — Cats (musical)

2006 — Peter Pan on Ice (ice-skating show)

2006 — Fantasy (ice-skating show)

2006–2008 — Mamma Mia! (musical)

2006 — Bugs Bunny on Ice (ice-skating show)

2008 — Love story (ice-skating show)

2008–2010 — Beauty and the Beast (musical)

2008–2009 — Peter Pan on Ice (ice-skating show)

2009–2010 — The Nutcracker (arena musical on ice)

2010–2011 — Zorro (musical)

2010 — Snow Queen (arena musical on ice)

2011–2012 — The Sound of Music (musical)

2011 — Sleeping Beauty (arena musical on ice)

2012–2014 —The Little Mermaid (musical)

2012–2013 — Mamma Mia! (musical)

2012 — The Three Musketeers (arena musical on ice)

2013–2014 — Chicago (musical)

2013 — The Wizard of OZ (arena musical on ice)

2014 — The Phantom of the Opera (musical )

2014 — Beauty and the Beast (musical)

2014 — Aladdin and the Lord of Fire (arena musical on ice)

2015 — Singin’ in the Rain (musical)

2015 — Sindbad and Princess Anna (arena musical on ice)

2016 — Cinderella (Rodgers and Hammerstein musical)

2016 — Dance of the Vampires (musical)

2017 — Anastasia (musical)

2017 — Ghost (musical)

2018 — The Play That Goes Wrong (play)

2019 — The Comedy About a Bank Robbery (play)

2019 — First Date (musical)

2020 — Chess (musical)

2020 — Lover’s Day (musical)

2022 — Fear Nothing, I’m With You (musical)

2023 — Mamma Mimo! (parody musical)

2024 — Elementary, Hudson! The Case of the Hound of the B. (musical comedy)

2024 — The Last Tale (musical)

2025 — Six (Spain, European tour, Barcelona, Spain)

2026 — Six (musical, first Spanish production, Madrid)

== Achievements and awards ==
2002 — Nord-Ost (musical) won the Golden Mask Award as the best show in category "Operetta/Musical"

2005 — Cats (musical) won EFFIE Award was given for the best brand in entertainment industry

2007 — Winner of the National Theatre Award Music Heart of Theatre — the best producer

2007 — Mamma Mia! (musical) won EFFIE Award was given for the best brand in entertainment industry — Mamma Mia!

2008 — Mamma Mia! (musical) was included in the Russian Book of Records as The most popular musical in Russia

2008 — Mamma Mia! (musical) won the Theater Award Ovation

2010 — The Nutcracker (arena musical on ice) was included in the Russian Book of Records as The most popular ice-skating musical in Russia

2014 — The Little Mermaid musical won the Golden Mask Award as the best show in the category "Operetta/Musical"

2014 — The first International Member of the Broadway League

2014 — The Phantom of the Opera (musical) opened the ХХ Anniversary Ceremony of National Russian Theater Award "Golden Mask"

2016 — The National Award "Person of the Year 2015" in the category "Culture"

2016 — The National Award "Brand N1 in Russia 2016" in the category "Cultural Event"

2022 — Chess (musical) won 3 Golden Mask Awards

2022 – Fear Nothing, I’m With You (musical) won KudaGo Award in the category "Show of the Year"

2024 – Fear Nothing, I’m With You (musical) won Event of the Year Award in the categories "Best Cultural Event" and "Best Socio-Cultural Event"

2024 – Fear Nothing, I’m With You (musical) was included in the Russian Book of Records in the category "Largest Audience for a Musical in Russia" — approximately 1,200,000 spectators over two seasons.
