= Chess Moves =

1985 film

- VHS cover
- Directed by: David G. Hillier
- Starring: Murray Head; Elaine Paige; Björn Skifs; Barbara Dickson; Tim Rice
- Music by: Benny Andersson; Björn Ulvaeus; Tim Rice
- Release date: 1985
- Language: English

Chess Moves is a 1985 music video compilation for the musical Chess directed by David G. Hillier.

== Overview ==
Chess Moves features five music videos of songs from the original Chess concept album. Chess lyricist Tim Rice provides introductions for each video.

== Cast ==
- The American – Murray Head
- Florence – Elaine Paige
- The Arbiter – Björn Skifs
- Svetlana – Barbara Dickson

== Videos ==
- "One Night in Bangkok" – The American
- "The Arbiter" – The Arbiter
- "Nobody's Side" – Florence
- "I Know Him So Well" – Florence and Svetlana
- "Pity the Child" – The American
