= Ivasi =

Russian bard duo

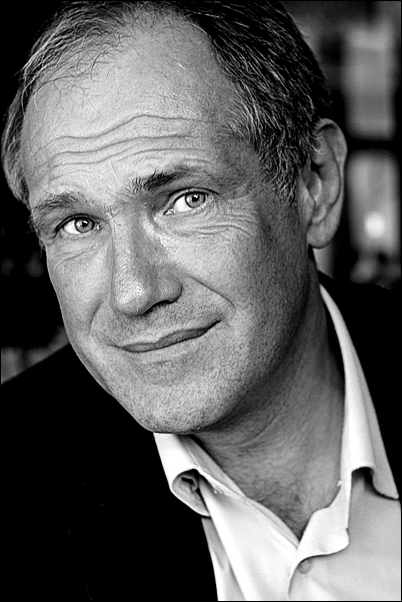
Aleksei Ivashchenko

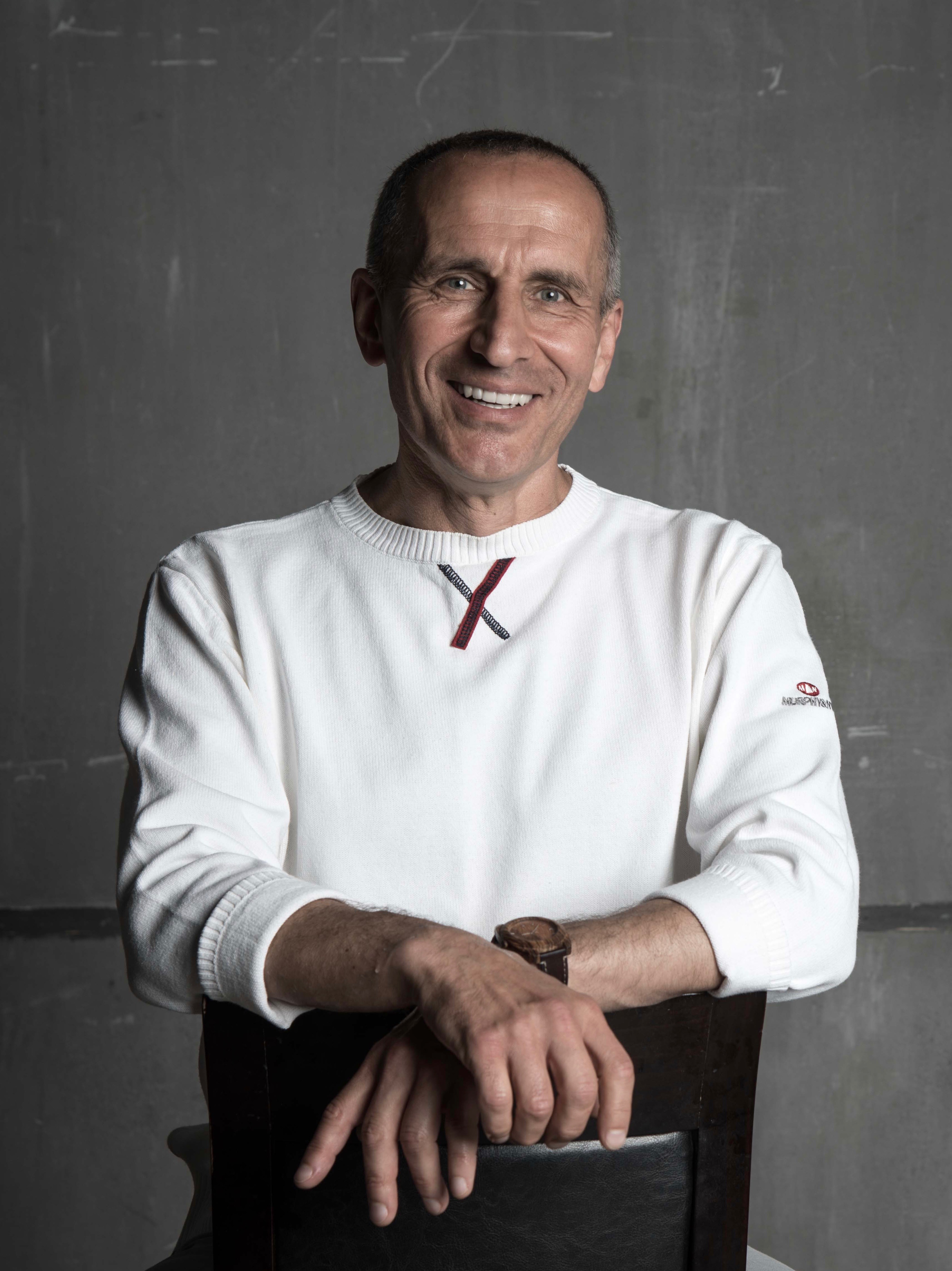
Georgy Vasilyev

Aleksei Ivashchenko (Russian: Алексей Игоревич Иващенко, born 12 May 1958 in Moscow) and Georgy Vasilyev (Russian: Георгий Леонардович Васильев, born 22 June 1957 in Zaporizhia, Ukraine) are a Soviet/Russian bard duo, informally known as Ivasi (a pun on the "iwashi herring"). They wrote and staged the musical Nord-Ost.

== Discography ==
Georgii Vasilyev's voice

- A. Ivashchenko, G. Vasilyev 'Alma-Mater' (1997)
- A. Ivashchenko, G. Vasilyev 'Balanda o Seledke' (1997)
- A. Ivashchenko, G. Vasilyev 'Berezhkariki' (1997)
- A. Ivashchenko, G. Vasilyev 'Dvornik Stepanov' (1997)
- A. Ivashchenko, G. Vasilyev 'Pripadki Molodosti (Posliednii)' (1997)
- A. Ivashchenko, G. Vasilyev 'Pripadki Molodosti (Predposlednii)' (1997)
- A. Ivashchenko, G. Vasilyev 'Pripadki Molodosti (Dvoinoi)' (1997)
- 'Pesni Nashego Veka' (in a bard ensemble) (2000)
- 'Nord-Ost: Selected Songs' (2002)
- A. Ivashchenko'Dve kapli na stakan vody' (2004)
- A. Ivashchenko, G. Vasilyev. Anthology (2004)
- 'The Complete Nord-Ost' (2005)
- 'Nord-Ost: Collection' (2005)
- A. Ivashchenko 'Esli' (2006)
