= Welton Jones =

American theatre critic

Welton Jones (June 18, 1936 – December 17, 2022) was a theater critic and critic-at-large for the San Diego Union-Tribune. Jones was born in Fort Worth, Texas and earned a degree in journalism from Texas A&M University in 1985. While working for the U.S. Coast Guard, Jones performed in community theater before becoming an arts and entertainment critic.

== Career ==
While working at The San Diego Union, Jones focused his writing on arts and entertainment. From 1966 to 2001, he worked for the Union-Tribune. Prior to working in San Diego, Jones worked for a number of publications including the New York Herald-Tribune, the Houston Post, the Lubbock Avalanche-Journal, and the Shreveport Times. He retired in 2001 after working as a critic for 35 years.

In 2001, he came to work for SANDIEGO.COM and helped with its expansion.

== Organizations ==
Jones is on the board of directors of the Save Our Heritage Organisation (SOHO), which is a non-profit devoted to preservation in San Diego. He is also an emeritus member of the American Theatre Critics Association (ATCA), where he served on its board of directors for nine years. He served four years in ATCA as chairman. He was also given the opportunity to represent the U.S. at a number of meetings of theatre critics. Jones also serves as a captain in the U.S. Coast Guard Reserves, a member of the Texas A&M University Former Journalism Student Association Hall of Honor and as a member of the jury that recommended Neil Simon for his only Pulitzer Prize.

== Personal ==
Jones spends his time writing, producing plays, and working with preserving Balboa Park, San Diego, California. He is survived by his wife
