= Nord-Ost =

2001 Russian musical theatre production

- Moscow advertisement
- Music: Aleksei Ivaschenko; Georgii Vasilyev
- Lyrics: Aleksei Ivaschenko; Georgii Vasilyev
- Basis: 1944 novel by Veniamin Kaverin; The Two Captains
- Productions: 2001, Dubrovka theatre, Moscow
- Awards: Golden Mask for Best Musical; Golden Mask for Best Performance by a Featured Actor

Nord-Ost (Russian: Норд-Ост, means "North-East" in German) is a Russian musical theatre production that was composed by Aleksei Ivaschenko and Georgii Vasilyev, based on the novel The Two Captains by Veniamin Kaverin. It is a fictional story based around the historical events surrounding the discovery of the Severnaya Zemlya archipelago in 1913. The musical was first staged on October 19, 2001 in the Dubrovka theatre, where it played over 400 performances.

The play celebrates the Russian soldiers who fought in World War II.

== Development ==
After failing to secure the rights to perform Les Misérables in Russia, Georgii Vasilyev decided to create a homegrown Russian production instead. He spent funds to convert a former ball-bearing factory "culture hall" into a modern theatre. He spent US$4 million, making the play the most expensive theatre project in the history of Russia. The tickets were US$15 each, making them relatively expensive. Vasilyev showed his financiers a marketing study stating that 30% of Moscow's population fit the profile audience that would be willing to pay for the production, due to changing sensibilities and increasing incomes.

Vasilyev said "Nord-Ost was a sort of protest against tarnishing our history, against not believing in your own strength, against all this pervasive, depressing, ugly stuff in mass media. Nord-Ost is the opposite. It's a romantic story about family. It's a story that elevates us and our history. It's a story that enables us to look at our history not as the history of class struggle, wars, and repressions, but a history of people and personal achievements".

== Terrorist attack ==
On October 23, 2002 Chechen terrorists took the audience hostage in the Moscow theater that was showing the production of Nord-Ost, threatening to blow up the building and demanding withdrawal of Russian troops from Chechnya. Most of the hostages were released after the theatre was stormed by special forces. 130 hostages died from poison gas used by Russian special forces; Nord-Ost lost 17 members of the team, including 2 child actors aged 13 (Kristina Kurbatova and Arsenii Kurilenko) and one third of all musicians in the orchestra. The producer Georgii Vasilyev had been among the hostages.

After the attack, Nord-Ost returned to the same theater stage in Moscow on February 8, 2003 and continued showing there until May 10, 2003, when the producers took it off the stage, blaming a lack of audience interest on fears caused by the attack.
