= Frankie J. Alvarez =

American actor (born 1983)

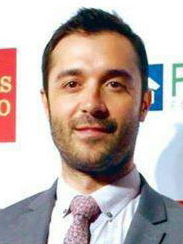
- Alvarez at the HBO Latinos in TV Panel & Spotlight on March 15, 2014.
- Born: Francisco Javier Alvarez; May 10, 1983 (age 43); Miami, Florida, U.S
- Education: Florida State University (BFA); Juilliard School (GrDip)
- Occupation: Actor
- Years active: 2008–present
- Spouse: Leah Walsh (m. 2013)
- Children: 2

Francisco Javier Alvarez (born May 10, 1983) is an American actor, known for his role as Agustín Lanuez in the HBO series Looking, and its subsequent series finale television film, Looking: The Movie.

== Early life and education ==
Alvarez's parents are originally from Cuba, his father from Havana, and his mother from Artemisa. He is first-generation American and was born and raised in Miami, Florida. Alvarez grew up with the arts in his family: his grandmother was an opera singer in Cuba, while his father played music in a band in Puerto Rico, his mother was a ballerina, and his three sisters all performed in the Miami City Ballet. Spanish was his first language, and he did not learn English until he was 7 or 8 years old, stating that he started learning English from watching baseball. While growing up, he attended an all-boys Jesuit prep school. Alvarez originally enrolled at Florida State University as a Creative Writing major, but applied to the fine arts program after a positive experience in the School of Theatre. He then graduated with a Bachelor of Fine Arts and moved to New York City, and was encouraged by a friend to apply to Juilliard School. He used a bilingual version of the balcony scene from Romeo and Juliet for his callback and was accepted into the program and received the Raul Julia Memorial Scholarship. He graduated from Juilliard in 2010.

== Acting career ==
=== Stage ===
While attending Juilliard, Alvarez trained at the Chautauqua Theater Company, appearing as Bernard in Death of a Salesman and Puck in A Midsummer Night's Dream in 2008. Alvarez portrayed the titular character in Brain Trust Production's The Tragedie of Cardenio at the 2010 Midtown International Theatre Festival, for which he won the award for Outstanding Lead Actor in a Play. After graduating from school, Alvarez performed in regional theater, landing his first professional acting role in a national tour production of Ramona Quimby, based on the popular children's book series. He continued to perform in regional theater, cast in a production of Julius Caesar as Lucius and Metellus Cimber and in Measure for Measure as Claudio for the 2011 Oregon Shakespeare Festival. His performances at the Oregon Shakespeare Festival resulted in his recruitment to Asolo Repertory Theatre, where he received praise for his lead role of Hamlet in the theatre's production of Hamlet: Prince of Cuba, a Spanish and English-language adaptation of the Shakespeare play reset in 19th century Havana. The play was translated into Spanish by Nilo Cruz and Alvarez studied the play for almost a year and learned to perform it in both Spanish and English. He later performed in the Actors Theatre of Louisville's 2013 production of The Whipping Man, where he portrayed Caleb, a wounded Jewish Confederate soldier in the American Civil War. The play received positive reviews, and Alvarez received praise for his "nuanced and empathetic" performance. He and friend Gabriel Ebert collaborated on the musical Those Lost Boys, about the one-night-only 10 year reunion of a rockstar band, which was developed and premiered at the 2013 Ars Nova All New Talent Fest and headlined the Ars Nova All New Talent Fest again in 2014.

=== Television ===
Alvarez appeared as a recurring minor role on the NBC television show Smash before landing his first major television role was the 2014 HBO series Looking as the main character Agustín, alongside co-stars Jonathan Groff and Murray Bartlett. The show focuses on the lives of three young gay men living in San Francisco. Alvarez originally auditioned for the role of recurring character Richie Ventura (played by Raúl Castillo), the love interest for Groff's character, Patrick, performing in a casting session over Skype. He was later asked to submit auditions for the role of Agustín. Within the week of his show at Actors Theatre of Louisville closing, he flew out for a second audition and was cast as Agustín. According to Alvarez, the character of Agustín was originally intended to be Venezuelan, rather than Cuban, spoke with an accent, and would be "figuring out his green card situation." Alvarez spoke with series creator Michael Lannan and the character was changed to a highly educated native U.S. citizen of Cuban descent, using some of Alvarez's personal traits, producing a portrayal of bicultural Latin-Americans that Alvarez felt was not seen as frequently in media. His performance garnered him praise from critics and a nomination for Best Supporting Actor by the Imagen Foundation Awards in 2014.

=== Audio book narration ===
Alvarez is also an audiobook narrator, appearing on the Oregon Shakespeare Festival's audio recording of Measure for Measure, and narrating audiobook works such as Héctor Tobar's The Barbarian Nurseries, Justin Torres's We the Animals, and Sebastian Rotella's Triple Crossing.

== Accolades ==
While attending Juilliard, Alvarez was the recipient of the prestigious Raul Julia Memorial Scholarship. In 2010, his performance in The Tragedie of Cardenio by Ben Bartolone earned him the Midtown International Theatre Festival's award for "Outstanding Lead Actor in a Play". His performance as Agustín in Looking also earned him a nomination for the Imagen Foundation Award's "Best Supporting Actor" in 2014.

== Personal life ==
Alvarez met his wife, Leah Walsh, as a first year student while both attended Juilliard, his wife a second year student. They married in May 2013. Walsh is also an actress and the couple live together in Astoria, Queens in New York City. They have two daughters

== Filmography ==
=== Film ===
Year	Title	Role	Notes
2014	Aphasia	Austin	Short film
2017	Rockaway	Older John	
2019	Vandal	Chino	
2021	The Drummer	Nate	

=== Television ===
Year	Title	Role	Notes
2013	Smash	Actor #6	3 episodes
2014–2015	Looking	Agustín Lanuez	Series regular; 18 episodes
2015	Madam Secretary	Zach	Episode: "The Time Is at Hand"
2015	The Good Wife	Steven Mund	Episode: "Loser Edit"
2015	Law & Order: Special Victims Unit	Javier Rojas	Episode: "Parents' Nightmare"
2016	Looking: The Movie	Agustín Lanuez	TV film
2016	Blue Bloods	Father Phillip	Episode: "Confessions"
2017	Blindspot	Julian Milliken	Episode: "Fix My Present Havoc"
2017	Controversy	Ben	TV film
2018	It's Freezing Out There	Frankie	Webseries
2019	New Amsterdam	Carl Jimenez	Episode: "Croaklahoma"
2022	Let the Right One In	Dr. Daniel Madigan	Episode: "More Than You'll Ever Know"
2023	Fantasy Island	Mateo	Episode: "Hurricane Helene/The Bachelor Party"
2023	The Blacklist	Izan Sandoval	Episode: "Wormwood"

=== Theatre ===
Year	Title	Role	Notes
2008	A Midsummer Night's Dream	Puck	Chautauqua Theater Company
2008	Death of a Salesman	Bernard	Chautauqua Theater Company
2010	The Tragedie of Cardenio	Cardenio	Midtown International Theatre Festival
2011	Julius Caesar	Lucius/Metellus Cimber	Oregon Shakespeare Festival
2011	Measure for Measure	Claudio	Oregon Shakespeare Festival
2012	Hamlet: Prince of Cuba (Hamlet: Príncipe de Cuba)	Hamlet	Asolo Repertory Theatre
2013	The Whipping Man	Caleb	Actors Theatre of Louisville
2016	Bathing in the Moonlight	Taviano	McCarter Theatre
2020	twenty50	Sebastian	Denver Center Theatre Company
2021	to the yellow house	Theo	La Jolla Playhouse
2023	Wet Brain	Ron	Playwrights Horizons

=== Audiobooks ===
Title	Author	Publication year	Role
We the Animals	Justin Torres	2011	Narrator
The Barbarian Nurseries	Héctor Tobar	2011	Narrator
Triple Crossing	Sebastian Rotella	2011	Narrator
Measure for Measure	William Shakespeare (Oregon Shakespeare Festival production)	2012	Claudio
