= List of Looking episodes =

Looking is an American comedy-drama television series created by Michael Lannan, based on his own short film Lorimer. The series, which is executive produced by Lannan, Andrew Haigh, David Marshall Grant and Sarah Condon, premiered on HBO on January 19, 2014. Looking focuses on the professional and personal lives of a small group of gay men living in San Francisco, California and stars Jonathan Groff, Frankie J. Alvarez, Murray Bartlett, Raúl Castillo, Lauren Weedman and Russell Tovey.

During the course of the series, 18 episodes of Looking aired over two seasons. On March 25, 2015, HBO canceled the series, but announced that a special would serve as a finale, which premiered at the Frameline Film Festival on June 26, 2016, and debuted on the network on July 23, 2016.

== Series overview ==
Season	Episodes	Originally aired	
Season	Episodes	First aired	Last aired
1	8	January 19, 2014	March 9, 2014
2	10	January 11, 2015	March 22, 2015
The Movie		June 26, 2016 (Frameline Film Festival); July 23, 2016 (HBO)	

== Episodes ==
=== Season 1 (2014) ===
No. overall	No. in season	Title	Directed by	Written by	Original release date	US viewers (millions)
1	1	"Looking for Now"	Andrew Haigh	Michael Lannan	January 19, 2014	0.338
Best friends Patrick, Agustín and Dom discuss the impending wedding of Patrick's ex when Patrick is invited to his bachelor party. Agustín, who is also Patrick's roommate, agrees to move in with his boyfriend, Frank, in Oakland. Dom, tired of serving younger, more successful men at the restaurant where he works, tells his roommate Doris that he’s thinking of reconnecting with old flame Ethan, now a successful realtor. Patrick meets up with a date from OkCupid but it ends badly. He rides the Muni tram and is chatted up by Richie, a barber who also works the door at Esta Noche, a Latin drag club in the Mission. At the bachelor party, Dom advises Patrick to stop picking dates based on what his mother would think, and Patrick considers accepting Richie's invitation to his club.
2	2	"Looking for Uncut"	Andrew Haigh	Andrew Haigh	January 26, 2014	0.286
Agustín moves in with Frank, with the help of Patrick and Dom. A reunion between Dom and his old flame Ethan does not go as planned. Patrick goes on a date with Richie but Patrick, having wrongly assumed that Richie is uncut, comes off as too promiscuous and makes a bad impression on him and wonders if Patrick just wanted to hook up with him to fulfill a Latino fetish.
3	3	"Looking at Your Browser History"	Andrew Haigh	Michael Lannan & Andrew Haigh	February 1, 2014	0.118
Attending a video game launch party, Patrick and his coworker Owen meet Kevin, who not only turns out to be Patrick's new boss, but is also gay. Feeling empowered after his encounter with Ethan, Dom shares with Doris his dream to start his own Portuguese chicken restaurant. Later, relaxing at a local bathhouse, Dom meets Lynn, an older man who is a successful entrepreneur. Stina fires Agustín after he tells her his opinion on her chair sculpture, but things start to look up for Agustín when he meets CJ—a sex worker.
4	4	"Looking for $220/Hour"	Ryan Fleck	Allan Heinberg	February 9, 2014	0.446
Taking advantage of a "work free" day on a Sunday, Patrick and Kevin bond. Kevin talks about the difficulty of having a relationship in their line of work, which requires long hours, but is interrupted when he receives a call from his boyfriend. Later Agustín and Doris convince Patrick to join them at the Folsom Street Fair, where leather clothing is a definite must. Dom skips the Fair and goes to Lynn's flower shop to seek his advice. They have lunch—but it's unclear if it's for business or pleasure. At the Fair Agustín encounters CJ, and takes into consideration "hiring" him for an art project.
5	5	"Looking for the Future"	Andrew Haigh	Andrew Haigh	February 16, 2014	0.505
Increasingly infatuated with Richie, Patrick calls in sick at work so that he and Richie can spend the day together. The two take in the sights of San Francisco, including Golden Gate Park, discover more about each other's past and talk frankly about their sexual boundaries.
6	6	"Looking in the Mirror"	Joe Swanberg	JC Lee & Tanya Saracho	February 23, 2014	0.519
Patrick's nerves get the best of him when Richie meets his friends for the first time at Dom's 40th birthday party. Dom insists to Doris that he and Lynn are just friends, but maintaining this position proves more difficult after Lynn arranges a meeting to introduce Dom to prospective investors in his restaurant. Agustín invites CJ to the party, where he and Frank finally meet and react to each other in a way Agustín did not expect. Things start to go south when a drunk Agustín makes a snobby comment about Richie to Patrick.
7	7	"Looking for a Plus-One"	Jamie Babbit	John Hoffman	March 2, 2014	0.433
Anxious about how his family will react to Richie at his sister's wedding, Patrick allows his anxiety to affect their budding relationship. Dom is not sure whether business or pleasure is at the heart of his relationship with Lynn, and dismisses Lynn's advice on the eve of his restaurant opening. Failing to achieve his goals with Frank and CJ's photo shoot, Agustín abandons his own art exhibit.
8	8	"Looking Glass"	Andrew Haigh	Michael Lannan & Tanya Saracho	March 9, 2014	0.425
Patrick tries his best to reconnect with Richie, feeling remorse about his own behavior at the wedding. Frank doesn't hold back and tells Agustín his feelings about his art—and their relationship. Patrick and Agustín attend Dom's restaurant opening. Dom is stunned by the guest Lynn brings along. Kevin makes a startling admission.

=== Season 2 (2015) ===
No. overall	No. in season	Title	Directed by	Written by	Original release date	US viewers (millions)
9	1	"Looking for the Promised Land"	Andrew Haigh	Andrew Haigh	January 11, 2015	0.183
Picking up roughly 2 months after the events of last season, Patrick, Agustín, Dom, and Doris spend time together in Lynn's luxurious cabin near the Russian River. After an ecstasy fueled party in the middle of the woods, Patrick calls Kevin for a late-night rendezvous, Agustín bonds with a fellow party-goer, and Dom makes the most of his open relationship. Eventually, Patrick confesses his secret relationship with Kevin to his friends.
10	2	"Looking for Results"	Andrew Haigh	Michael Lannan	January 18, 2015	0.195
The stresses of Patrick's relationship with Kevin cause him to act erratically over a small rash. Following the visit to the cabin, Dom and Lynn bond and further discuss their relationship. Agustín falls back into irresponsible behavior, getting drunk off margaritas and taking GHB at a dance club, and is eventually found by Richie. Patrick and Richie are briefly reunited when Richie returns Agustín home.
11	3	"Looking Top to Bottom"	Ryan Fleck	John Hoffman	January 25, 2015	0.324
With Kevin's partner Jon out of town for a weekend business trip to San Diego, Kevin and Patrick make plans to use the time to spend together, which includes attending Dom's gay rugby league match. Agustín goes to Richie's barber shop to thank him for helping him when he was drunk. There, Agustín apologizes for the way he treated him at Dom's 40th birthday party. Dom starts to wonder if Lynn truly supports his dream of opening his own restaurant.
12	4	"Looking Down the Road"	Ryan Fleck	Roberto Aguirre-Sacasa	February 8, 2015	0.192
Patrick tests the waters with Richie to see if they can still be friends. Meanwhile, he begins questioning his relationship with Kevin after spotting him with Jon at the farmers’ market. Agustín gets inspiration from spending a day at the shelter with Eddie. Doris helps Dom set up a Kickstarter campaign. Later, Dom is greeted by an unexpected guest at Lynn’s.
13	5	"Looking for Truth"	Andrew Haigh	Tanya Saracho	February 15, 2015	0.150
After ending his affair with Kevin, Patrick helps Richie with an ice cream truck he just bought. They spend the day reminiscing about their relationship and Patrick learns more about Richie's past, including his troubled relationship with his father, who still refuses to accept his son's homosexuality. Agustín visits Eddie, who is home faking sick.
14	6	"Looking for Gordon Freeman"	Jamie Babbit	JC Lee	February 22, 2015	0.204
Patrick decides to be a "fun gay" by throwing a Halloween party. Richie and Kevin turn up with their respective partners, and things take a turn for the worse when Patrick gets drunk.
15	7	"Looking for a Plot"	Andrew Haigh	Jhoni Marchinko	March 1, 2015	0.239
When Doris's father dies unexpectedly, Dom and Patrick accompany her to Modesto for the funeral. Together with Doris, the two visit nostalgic destinations from Dom's past, including The Brave Bull. Upon their return, Kevin makes another startling admission.
16	8	"Looking for Glory"	Jamie Babbit	Michael Lannan & JC Lee	March 8, 2015	0.303
Patrick and Kevin decide to make their new relationship known at Most Dangerous Games. The two also debut their new app at the GaymerX convention, where they run into Richie and Brady. Agustín, now in a sexual relationship with Eddie, starts letting his own hidden fears over HIV take over. Dom worries that Doris is beginning to drift away from him.
17	9	"Looking for Sanctuary"	Craig Johnson	Roberto Aguirre-Sacasa & Tanya Saracho	March 15, 2015	0.312
Patrick helps Kevin move into his new apartment. At the same time, his mother visits from Colorado with some shocking news for both Patrick and his sister Megan, which she shares during a visit at the San Francisco Zoo. Dom and Doris have a falling out after she reveals that her uncle is challenging her father's will, hence delaying the money for Dom's food window. Eddie tries to get Agustín to paint a mural for the youth shelter.
18	10	"Looking for Home"	Andrew Haigh	Andrew Haigh & John Hoffman	March 22, 2015	0.298
After Patrick moves into Kevin's new apartment, the two are invited to a neighbor's holiday party, which turns out to be an impending sex party. Malik encourages Dom to fix his fractured relationship with Doris. Agustín reveals his mural at the youth shelter. After Patrick discovers that Kevin is on Grindr, a simple discussion turns into an epic argument. Kevin proposes the idea of an open relationship, leaving Patrick uncertain of his future with him and questioning what he wants in a partner. Later, Patrick sneaks out of bed to get an impromptu haircut from Richie.

=== Looking: The Movie (2016) ===
Title	Directed by	Written by	Original release date	US viewers (millions)
"Looking: The Movie"	Andrew Haigh	Andrew Haigh & Michael Lannan	June 2, 2016 (Frameline Film Festival); July 23, 2016 (HBO)	0.284
About eleven months after the last episode, Patrick has broken up with Kevin and moved to Denver--but he now returns to San Francisco for the wedding of Agustín and Eddie. Inspired by some advice from a one-night stand, Patrick reaches out to Kevin in the hopes of closure. He learns that Kevin and Jon have gotten back together and plan on moving to London. Kevin admonishes him for how things ended, admits he still loves Patrick and wishes they'd given their relationship a real chance. He also announces that he's moving to London and suggests that Patrick - who is leading his own team in Denver - take over Kevin's current job at Most Dangerous Games. Meanwhile, Dom's attitudes to relationships are changing, Doris and Malik decide that they're going to try to have a baby, Agustín and Eddie face their issues and proceed with the wedding, and Richie's relationship with Brady (who is showing signs of a serious drinking problem) hits a breaking point. In the end, Patrick finds what he's been looking for all along with Richie, who wants to leave San Francisco and move to Texas.

== Home media releases ==
Season	DVD and Blu-ray release dates			Special features
Season	Region 1	Region 2	Region 4	Special features
1	January 6, 2015	January 12, 2015	December 10, 2014	Digital copies of all eight episodes, six audio commentaries with actors Jonathan Groff, Frankie J. Álvarez, Murray Bartlett, Raúl Castillo, and Lauren Weedman, and crew members executive producer/creator Michael Lannan, executive producer Andrew Haigh, DP Reed Morano, director Jamie Babbitt, and writers John Hoffman, JC Lee, and Tanya Saracho.
The Complete Series and the Movie	November 15, 2016	November 14, 2016	TBA	Season 1: audio commentaries as above. Season 2: audio commentaries on all ten episodes, with contributions from actors Groff, Álvarez, Bartlett, Castillo, Weedman, Russell Tovey, and Daniel Franzese, and crew members Haigh, Lannan, Hoffman, Saracho, Lee, and writer Roberto Aguirre-Sacasa. The Movie: none
