= El Chicano (disambiguation) =

El Chicano may refer to:

- El Chicano, a musical group from Los Angeles
- El Chicano (film), a 2019 American superhero film
- El Chicano (wrestler), the professional alias of wrestler Carlos Cotto

== See also ==
- Chicano (disambiguation)
