= Raúl Castillo (actor) =

American actor and playwright (born 1977)

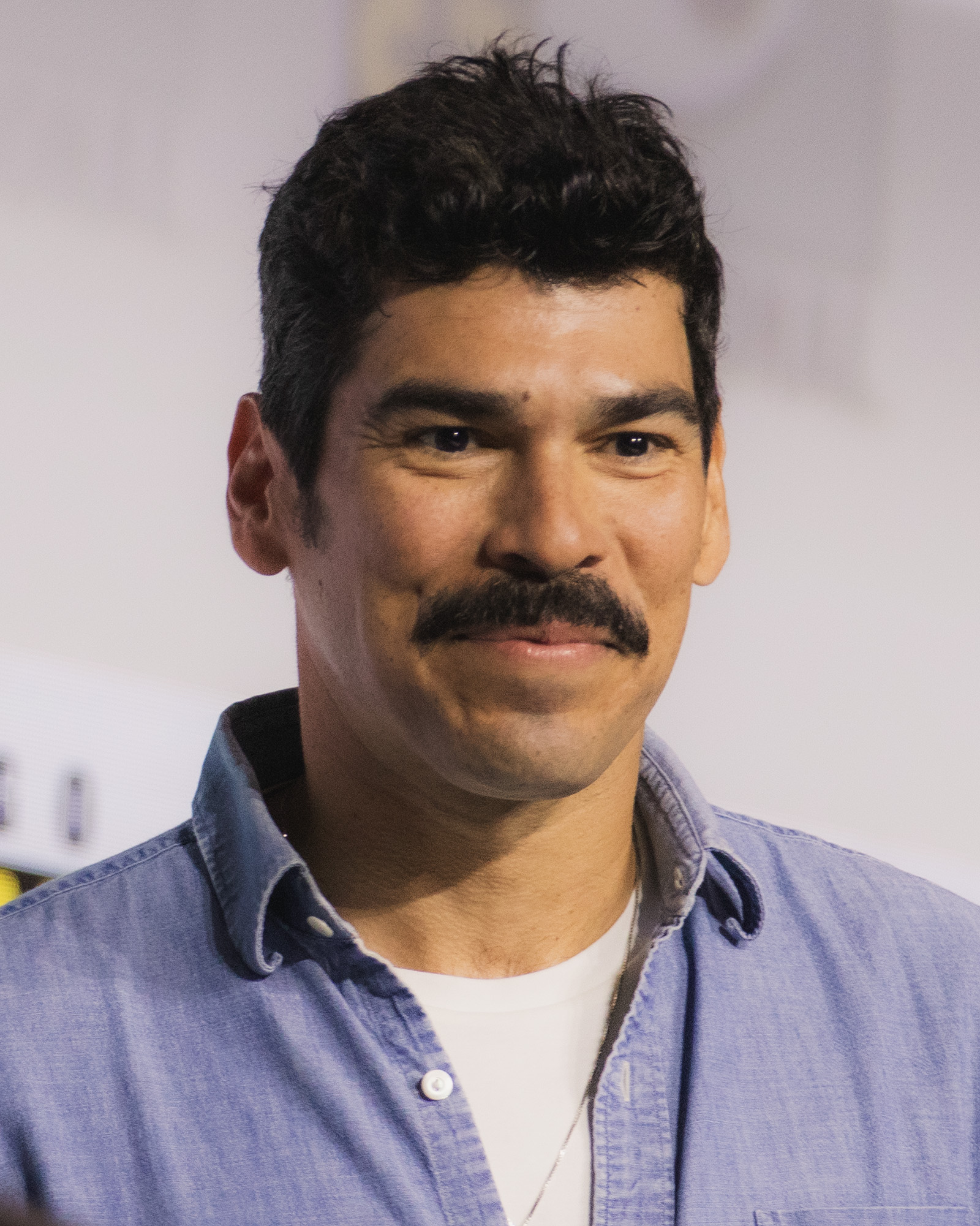
- Castillo in 2026
- Born: August 30, 1977 (age 49); McAllen, Texas, U.S.
- Education: Boston University (BFA)
- Occupations: Actor; playwright
- Years active: 2000–present

Raúl Castillo Jr. (born August 30, 1977) is an American actor and playwright. He is known for his acting roles in Amexicano and Cold Weather and his role as Richie Donado Ventura in the HBO series Looking and its subsequent feature-length series finale Looking: The Movie. He received a nomination for the Independent Spirit Award for Best Supporting Male for his performance in the film We the Animals.

His notable written plays include Border Stories and Between Me, You, and the Lampshade. His works are associated with the LAByrinth Theater Company and the Atlantic Theater Company.

== Early life ==
Raúl Castillo Jr. was born to Raúl H. Castillo Sr. and Adela "Adelita" Rodríguez de Castillo. He has an older brother, Tony, and a younger sister. His parents are Mexican immigrants from Reynosa, Tamaulipas, Mexico, who later moved to McAllen, Texas, where he and his siblings were raised. His hometown of McAllen was 90 percent Mexican-American. Living so close to the Mexico–United States border, Castillo's family would often visit family members who still lived in Reynosa, affording him an upbringing that he describes as "very much bicultural." Castillo states that growing up in a border town made him feel American when he visited Mexico, but Mexican when he traveled around the United States. He explains he was "too American for Mexico, but too Mexican for the U.S." He was raised Catholic. His childhood nickname was "Gordo" ("fat", in Spanish), due to his weight.

Castillo first became interested in acting in the third grade, after seeing his older brother in a school production of The Wizard of Oz as the Tin Woodman. His brother also was a musician who played guitar, his dedication having been seen by Castillo as he would sit and play scales for hours, which inspired Castillo to use the same technique later for his own performances. He auditioned the next year for a school play, reportedly "about a mouse and a clock", but could not stop giggling during his audition and was cast instead in a non-speaking role as a guard. While in sixth grade at Our Lady of Sorrows Catholic School, Castillo met and befriended future Mutemath bass guitarist Roy Mitchell-Cárdenas. Later, in high school, they started an underground punk-rock band called IPM (short for "Influential Phecal Material") together with their friends Nick Trevino and Robert Vleck. Mitchell-Cárdenas played drums while Castillo played bass guitar. Before he began acting, Castillo considered pursuing a serious career as a rock musician.

Castillo states that he started acting when he was 14. Seeking an elective class option when entering McAllen High School, and a way to make friends, he turned to theater, which was popular at his high school. He became deeply involved in the high school drama department, which he says looked "fun". His background playing music since age 11 made performing on stage feel natural for him. His first acting role was in a high school production of Paul Zindel's play The Secret Affairs of Mildred Wild. Castillo also performed in his school’s production of I Remember Mama. It was then, at age 14, that he met and became friends with future staff writer for Devious Maids, Girls and Looking, Tanya Saracho, who also attended McAllen High School. Saracho influenced Castillo greatly, introducing him to playwrights and encouraging to develop his own tastes in drama. Castillo cites the 1993 film Carlito's Way as the film that "changed everything" for him. He was inspired by the performances of John Leguizamo, John Ortiz, Viggo Mortensen, and Luis Guzmán in particular. He even memorized some of Leguizamo's phrases and dialogue, such as "Spic-O-Rama", "Mambo Mouth", and "Freak". Castillo also found inspiration from several Hispanic artists in the media, including Miguel Piñero, and an anthology of works from the Nuyorican Poets Cafe. He looked up to several actors, such as Al Pacino and Anthony Quinn, as icons, and spent much of his time watching the film The Outsiders.

After graduating high school, Castillo went on to study playwriting as an undergraduate at Boston University College of Fine Arts, though he continued to act, and majored in theater. During his studies, Castillo felt that the most important skill he developed there was learning how to produce his own work. He would regularly put on plays during the school's student-run playwright's festival. This university offered festival gave Castillo a platform for his original work. Most of his early plays were heavy and serious, dealing with the sociopolitical and racial tensions on the border of Mexico and the United States, including a trio of one-act plays called Border Stories, about life on the Mexico–United States border in Reynosa. He graduated from Boston University in 1999.

Castillo viewed himself as more of a writer, despite his performing abilities. It was not until after college, while performing the lead role in a 2000 production of Santos & Santos at the Nushank Theater Collective in Austin, Texas, that he felt encouraged in identifying as an actor as well. He moved to New York City in 2002, which he describes as the smartest decision he made for his career.

== Acting career ==
=== Stage ===
Castillo has an extensive off-Broadway theater career. Right after college, Castillo performed in Austin, Texas in a 2000 production of "Santos & Santos", loosely based on Jamiel Chagra and his brothers. It was during that production that Castillo solidified his confidence in being a professional actor. Castillo joined the LAByrinth Theater Company as a writer shortly after moving to New York. His on-stage acting debut was with the LAByrinth Theater Company's production of José Rivera's play School of the Americas at New York's Public Theater in 2006. There he met actress and later co-star Sandra Oh while she was performing in the Public Theater's production of Satellites. His performance as Beto in the Ensemble Studio Theatre's 2008 production of José Rivera's Flowers was described as "flawlessly nuanced" by Laura Collins-Hughes of The New York Sun. In 2009, he performed in the Off-Broadway premier of Cusi Cram's A Lifetime Burning at Premiere Stages. In 2012, he was cast in Goodman Theater's production of the Cándido Tirado's play Fish Men, about the Guatemalan genocide, in the lead role of Rey Reyes. Castillo also appeared in the 2012 BareBones production of Jesus Hopped the 'A' Train in Pittsburgh, the inaugural performance of which was directed by Philip Seymour Hoffman for the LAByrinth Theater Company. He later was cast in the BareBones reading of The Way West at the Lark Theater. Castillo worked with INTAR Theater, cast in the role of Ismael in the theater's 2014 production of Adoration of the Old Woman to positive reviews. He starred alongside Sandra Oh in the role of Gerardo in the 2014 Victory Gardens Theater production of Death and the Maiden, which was well received by critics. Death and the Maiden deals with the lives of a couple, a woman who has dealt with some of the atrocities that have occurred under a dictatorship. Castillo describes his heavy role as a "character dealing with the bureaucracy of government, trying to look into the crimes that were committed, specifically the deaths that were committed during the dictatorship". Death and the Maiden was originally produced on Broadway with Glenn Close, Richard Dreyfuss, and Gene Hackman, but Latino actors such as Castillo felt undervalued when ethnic characters were not cast in a play by a Chilean playwright.

=== Film ===
Castillo first appeared in the 2005 short film Immaculate Perception. He acted in several other short films until his feature film debut role as Ignacio in the 2007 independent film, Amexicano. The film was screened at the 2007 Tribeca Film Festival and won the Jury Award for producer/director Matthew Bonifacio in the category of Narrative Film at the 2007 Sonoma Valley Film Festival. The film was released theatrically in 2008. He continued to appear in short films and independent films, such as My Best Day, and Bless Me, Ultima. His role in the 2011 independent film Cold Weather garnered favorable reviews and praise from critic Roger Ebert. His performance as Hector in the 2012 Student Academy Award-winning short film Narcocorrido earned him an Honorable Mention for Performance at AFI Fest 2012. His performance was praised as a "penetrating lead performance that conveys a sense of loss that leaves a lasting mark on the audience.” In 2019, Castillo starred in the independent film El Chicano, drawing praise from The Hollywood Reporter, which noted that his "charismatic performance in the lead role carries much of the film's weight".

=== Television ===
During his acting career, Castillo has appeared in various TV roles, including shows such as Nurse Jackie, Blue Bloods, and Law & Order. He was cast in the lead role of the action-comedy web series The Trainee and also appeared in the web series East WillyB in a recurring role as Edgar.

In 2014, Castillo was cast in the HBO series Looking as Ricardo "Richie" Donado Ventura, the love interest of main character Patrick, played by Jonathan Groff. HBO describes Looking as a "look as the unfiltered experiences of close friends searching for happiness and intimacy in an age of unparalleled choice". Castillo had previously worked with series creator Michael Lannan as the character Richie in the 2011 short film "Lorimer", upon which Lannan based the pilot episode of Looking. Lannan initially reached out to Castillo to participate in Lorimer after seeing his performance in Cold Weather. He contacted Castillo again in 2012 to audition for the Looking pilot. Castillo went through several auditions for both the part of Agustín and Richie, initially being passed on, before being offered the recurring role on the show. To research his role as Richie, Castillo watched Looking executive producer Andrew Haigh's 2011 film Weekend. His performance as Richie Donado was universally hailed as a break out role in the series. Critics particularly noted Castillo's portrayal of an openly gay Mexican-American man as a rare representation of the Latino-American community on television.

Castillo describes his role in Looking as important to the LGBTQ and Latino community. In an interview with Backstage, Castillo states "Especially being a straight guy, I wanted to honor this character. And even though it wasn't representing the entire community—this was one story—I knew there would be a lot of expectations. I know, having done projects around the Latino community, that there were going to be a lot of people paying attention." He told Out magazine that he hopes that his character on the show will both enlighten and educate straight audiences, as well as shed light on some of the experiences of the gay Latino community. Castillo and his character Richie gained a large social media following, using the hashtag #TeamRichie. In the show's second season, Castillo was added as a regular cast member alongside co-stars Groff, Frankie J. Álvarez, Murray Bartlett, Lauren Weedman, and Russell Tovey. Due to poor ratings, however, HBO decided to cancel Looking after its second season. HBO decided in lieu of a third season, Looking would end with a final full-length movie.

In 2015, Castillo appeared as Eduardo Flamingo, the emotionless, unfeeling villain on Fox Broadcasting Company's drama series Gotham.

== Playwriting ==
Castillo has long been interested in playwriting, studying it in college and initially viewing himself as more of a playwright than an actor. During college, Castillo regularly wrote plays for student-run playwright's festivals. One of his college plays to be produced at the student festival was a trio of one-act plays called Border Stories, about life on the U.S.-Mexican border in Reynosa. After moving to New York, he initially joined the LAByrinth Theater Company as a writer before also becoming an actor, and he remains a resident writer for LAByrinth. Castillo's play, Knives and Other Sharp Objects, about class, race, and assimilation in South Texas, debuted at the Public Theater as part of LAByrinth's works in development in 2009. The play received moderate reviews. His play Between You, Me, and the Lampshade was developed at the Atlantic Theater Company and is set to premiere in 2015 with the Chicago-based Teatro Vista, the largest Latino Equity theater company in Illinois, at the Richard Christiansen Theater at the Victory Gardens Biograph Theatre. Raul Castillo's dark comedy Between You, Me and the Lampshade explores a family's life on the U.S.-Mexico border.

== Accolades ==
In 2012, Castillo was awarded an AFI Honorable Mention in Performance for his lead role in Narcocorrido. Raul Castillo won a special mention at the Ashland Independent Film Festival in 2012 for his role in My Best Day. In 2014, the National Association of Latino Independent Producers presented Castillo with the Lupe Award – named after the late, pioneering Latina actress Lupe Ontiveros – in recognition of his breakout performance in Looking. His is the second actor to be awarded the Lupe Award since its creation. He also won Best Performance - Comedy at the NAMIC Vision Awards for his performance in Looking. He has been nominated several times for his supporting role as Richie in Looking, including at the 2016 NAMIC Vision Awards and the 2015 and 2016 Imagen Foundation Awards. In November 2016 he received a Film Independent Spirit Awards nomination for Best Supporting Actor for his role in We the Animals.

== Personal life ==
When I would go to Mexico, my brother and sister and I would be the gringos. Then I went out to school in Boston and felt so un-American. Everyone always asked, "Where are you from?" I said, "Texas." And then they said, "No, where are you from from?" Then I understood that this is what most of America is like, and that I grew up sheltered.

— Raúl Castillo, Out.com

Despite having a bicultural upbringing, Castillo stated that he always felt American growing up, and that he and his siblings were considered "gringos" when they visited Mexico. He identifies as Mexican-American. Castillo describes his childhood as sheltered from racism and racial dynamics in the US due to McAllen's high Hispanic and Latino population. When Castillo moved to Boston to study acting, it was his first time experiencing life as an ethnic minority.

Castillo is very close with his family. Though he was raised Catholic, he describes himself currently as "not as religiously involved." He describes his parents as "old school and traditional, [but] very open-minded." Before shooting the pilot for Looking, Castillo wrote a letter to his family to explain the part and make them aware of the more explicit aspects of the show. His family was supportive of his role.

His sister is an accountant and is married to chef and restaurateur Omar Rodriguez.

Although his role as Richie Ventura in Looking has garnered Castillo popularity among gay viewers, he is heterosexual. As of 2016, he was in a relationship. He resides in Hell's Kitchen, Manhattan.

== Filmography ==
=== Film ===
| Year | Title | Role | Notes |
|---|---|---|---|
| 2005 | Immaculate Perception | José | Short film |
| 2005 | Tadpoles | The Man | Short film |
| 2007 | The Negative | Rick Del Valle | Short film |
| 2007 | Amexicano | Ignacio | |
| 2008 | Paraíso Travel | Carlos | |
| 2008 | Arroyo Seco | | Video short |
| 2009 | Don't Let Me Drown | Alex | |
| 2010 | Cold Weather | Carlos | |
| 2010 | Gareeb Narwaz's Taxi | Manny | Short film |
| 2011 | Lorimer | Richie | Short film |
| 2011 | Narcocorrido | Héctor / Lázaro De Yuma | Short film |
| 2012 | Hated | Train passenger | |
| 2012 | My Best Day | Neil | |
| 2012 | Local Tourists | Sal | Short film |
| 2012 | Kiss Me | Kid Vargas | Short film |
| 2012 | #ImHere – THE CALL | Raf | Short film |
| 2013 | Bless Me, Ultima | Andrew | |
| 2015 | Sweets | Lincoln | |
| 2015 | Staring in the Sun | Sonny | |
| 2016 | Special Correspondents | Domingo | |
| 2017 | Permission | Heron | |
| 2018 | We the Animals | Paps | |
| 2018 | Unsane | Jacob | |
| 2019 | El Chicano | Diego Hernandez/El Chicano, Pedro Hernandez | |
| 2019 | Knives Out | Cop | |
| 2020 | Little Fish | Ben | |
| 2021 | Wrath of Man | Sam | |
| 2021 | Army of the Dead | Mikey Guzman | |
| 2021 | The Same Storm | Nurse Joey | |
| 2021 | Night Teeth | Jay Perez | |
| 2021 | Mother/Android | Arthur | |
| 2022 | Cha Cha Real Smooth | Joseph | |
| 2022 | Hustle | Oscar | |
| 2022 | The Inspection | Rosales | |
| 2023 | Cassandro | Gerardo | |
| 2024 | Breathe | Micah | |
| 2024 | Smile 2 | Darius Bravo | |
| 2024 | Push | The Client | |
| 2025 | The Hand That Rocks the Cradle | Miguel Morales | |
| TBA | Casket Girls | TBA | Post-production |

=== Television ===
| Year | Title | Role | Notes |
|---|---|---|---|
| 2009 | Nurse Jackie | Joseph | Episode: "Nose Bleed" |
| 2009 | Law & Order | Eddy Blanco | Episode: "Boy Gone Astray" |
| 2009 | All My Children | Carlos | 1 episode |
| 2009 | Damages | Cop | Episode: "Drive It Through Hardcore" |
| 2011 | The Trainee | Henry Howell / The Trainee | 3 episodes |
| 2011–2013 | East WillyB | Edgar | 3 episodes |
| 2012 | The Girl | Border Agent | TV film |
| 2013 | Murder in Manhattan | Nelson | TV film |
| 2013 | Blue Bloods | Raul | Episode: "No Regrets" |
| 2014–2015 | Looking | Richie Donado Ventura | 14 episodes |
| 2015 | Gotham | Eduardo Flamingo / The Flamingo | Episode: "Rise of the Villains: A Bitter Pill to Swallow" |
| 2016 | Looking: The Movie | Richie Donado Ventura | TV film |
| 2016 | Easy | Bernardo "Bernie" | Episode: "Controlada" |
| 2017 | Riverdale | Oscar Castillo | Episode: "Chapter Five: Heart of Darkness" |
| 2017–2018 | Atypical | Nick | Recurring; 10 episodes |
| 2018 | Seven Seconds | Felix Osorio | Regular; 10 episodes |
| 2019 | Vida | Baco | Recurring; 4 episodes |
| 2023 | Class of '09 | Amos | Main cast |
| 2023 | American Horror Stories | Toby | Episode: "Organ" |
| 2025 | Task | Cliff Broward | 5 episodes |
| 2026 | The Walking Dead: Dead City | Luis DeLeon | Main cast (season 3); 8 episodes |
| TBA | Life Is Strange | David Madsen | Main cast |

== Stage ==
| Year | Title | Role | Notes |
|---|---|---|---|
| 2000 | Santos & Santos | Tomás | Nushank Theater Collective |
| 2006 | School of the Americas | First Army Ranger | The Public Theater with LAByrinth Theater Company |
| 2008 | Flowers | Beto | Ensemble Studio Theatre |
| 2009 | A Lifetime Burning | Alejandro | Primary Stages Theater |
| 2009 | References to Salvador Dalí Make Me Hot | Benito | New School for Drama Theater with ABroad Studio Company |
| 2012 | Fish Men | Rey Reyes | Goodman Theater |
| 2012 | Jesus Hopped the 'A' Train | Angel Cruz | New Hazlett Theater |
| 2012 | The Way West | | Lark Theater |
| 2013 | Contigo | Tigo | The Pershing Square Signature Center |
| 2014 | Adoration of the Old Woman | Ismael | INTAR Theater |
| 2014 | Death and the Maiden | Gerardo Escobar | Victory Gardens Theater |
