= The Brave Bull =

Gay bar in Modesto, California

- Interactive map of The Brave Bull
- Address: 701 S 9th St, Modesto, CA 95351; Modesto; United States
- Coordinates: 37°37′13″N 120°59′9″W
- Owner: Casey Lubbers

Construction
- Opened: 1973

The Brave Bull is a gay bar in Modesto, California. Established in 1973 by Casey Lubbers as a super disco, it is the oldest gay bar in Stanislaus County which is still operational.

== History ==
The Brave Bull was well-known for its early superior sound system, and it attracted patrons from as far abroad as Europe. Drag performer Divine and San Francisco gay rights activist Harvey Milk were among the notable patrons of the bar.

On the morning of December 10, 2020, Ceres and Modesto firefighters extinguished a fire at the front entrance to the Brave Bull. Reports of smoke were made a little after 7:30am. The owner told The Modesto Bee that he believed the fire was set as a hate crime, but this has not been confirmed by authorities.

== In popular culture ==
The Brave Bull is featured in Season 2 Episode 7 of the HBO original series Looking.
