= 36 Questions =

2017 podcast musical

- A Podcast Musical
- by Two-Up Productions
- Music: Chris Littler and Ellen Winter
- Lyrics: Chris Littler and Ellen Winter
- Premiere: June 14, 2017 (Teaser)
- Productions: 2017 Original Podcast Cast

36 Questions is a 2017 musical podcast by Two-Up Productions with music and lyrics by Chris Littler and Ellen Winter and sound design by Joel Raabe. It follows the story of an estranged husband and wife trying to reconnect over the "36 Questions That Lead to Love", which were a part of a psychological study by Arthur Aron that explores intimacy. Released in three 50-minute acts, the three episodes were released by Two-Up Productions on July 10, July 24, and August 7, respectively, and it starred Jonathan Groff and Jessie Shelton.

== Casts ==
Character	Original cast Recording 2017	YouTube cast Recording 2020
Judith Ford (Natalie Cook)	Jessie Shelton	Gracie Butterfield
Jase Connolly	Jonathan Groff	Matthew Wangemann
Cooper Connolly	Johnny Mirandona	Unknown

== Musical numbers ==
Songs numbered in chronological order
Act I	Act II	Act III
1. "Hear Me Out" – Judith; 2. "One Thing" – Jase and Judith; 3. "Natalie Cook" – Judith and Jase; 4. "Judith Ford" – Jase; 5. "For the Record" – Jase and Judith	6. "We Both" – Jase and Judith; 7. "Our Word" – Judith; 8. "A Better Version" – Judith; 9. "Reality" – Jase	10. "Answer 36" – Judith; 11. "Listen Back" – Jase; 12. "Attachment" – Jase; 13. "The Truth" – Jase and Judith

== Characters ==
- Judith Ford (Natalie Cook) – Jase's estranged wife, who lied about her name when she met Jase, using the name Natalie Cook, which she used throughout the two years of their relationship. Despite lying about her identity, she loves Jase and attempts to save their relationship by using the 36 Questions.
- Jase Connolly – Judith's estranged husband, who was under the impression that Judith was called Natalie Cook for their entire relationship. After finding out that 'Natalie' was actually called Judith and had faked her identity for the entirety of their relationship, he leaves without saying goodbye, leaving his wedding ring on the kitchen counter and going to his childhood home. He has two mothers and a brother.
- Cooper Connolly – Cooper is Jase's son who comes in later in the story. He appears in the last scene between the songs "Attachment" and "The Truth" when Jase and Judith agree to meet up with each other at a restaurant. Cooper only has a speaking role and serves as physical proof of the rift between the two caused by time.
- Henry – A duck that Jase found on his mothers' patio and developed an instant attachment for. Henry likes to eat Cheerios.

== Plot ==
=== Act I ===
Natalie Cook, married wife to Jase Connolly for two years, discloses to a voice recording (the musical's framing device) that her real name is Judith Ford and that she's been lying to her husband since the moment they met. She tracks down Jase and proposes that he should hear her out so he can truly know the person he's trying to let go ("Hear Me Out").

Jase reluctantly lets Judith inside and confronts her about the situation, but Judith evades most of the conversation by asking about a duck in the room named Henry. Jase complains about the maintenance he’s had to do at the house and how his attempts to fix the place are making it worse. ("One Thing")

In an effort to win over Jase, Judith takes every document she forged to become Natalie and offers to set them on fire in order to move on from her past. ("Natalie Cook")

To prove her real identity, Judith shows Jase her passport, and immediately offers to do the 36 Questions, but he refuses. She persists and asks him Question 1, and Jase begrudgingly answers that he'd have dinner with Judith. ("Judith Ford")

A storm strikes and they head back inside, greeted by a startled Henry. Both characters take turns disclosing to the record how they feel about the situation, Jase being wary and Judith being hopeful, before coming together for a bottle of wine. ("For the Record")

=== Act II ===
Act 2 opens with progress being made through the questions and Jase claiming that he doesn't know anything about Judith, only that he knew Natalie. One of the following questions has them name three things they seem to have in common, so the pair take turns doing so before resolving on the idea that some things have held true about Judith and that she was actually real around him. ("We Both")

The record cuts off and picks up again in Jase’s truck, with the two driving around so Judith can charge her phone since the storm knocked the power out. Judith reads off a question that has the pair disclose what they wish they could change about their childhood, which leads her to reveal childhood trauma surrounding her parents, who were pathological liars, and her near-death experience. ("Our Word")

They proceed through the questions, eventually getting to one that has them recount their life stories in detail. Judith rushes through her answer, much to Jase’s ire, but she claims her life really started when she met Jase, and that she was living a better life with him. ("A Better Version")

Another record starts with them in a motel and tension getting high as they disclose their feelings and intentions to each other over more drinks. Jase eventually declares he deserves someone who can accept reality, and despite wanting his old life back and not being fully past Judith, he must leave. ("Reality")

Jase leaves Judith at the motel after lots of arguing, so she begins sobbing and pours herself a drink, somberly asking herself the next question: "If you knew that in one year you would die suddenly, would you change anything about the way you are now living? Why?" The record ends.

=== Act III ===
Act 3 opens up with Judith walking back to Jase’s house. She admits that she's frustrated, but wants to finish what she started, claiming once again that Jase deserves to fully know the person he's walking away from.

Upon catching Jase in a hurry to pick up his moms from the airport, the pair begin arguing until Jase draws the line, telling Judith directly that he’s done, and leaves. Over an instrumental reprise of “Hear Me Out”, Judith gives herself a pep talk, saying it'll be strange to live without him, but that she deserves to let him go and build a better version on her own. She says that she loves Jase and she probably always will, and leaves her phone in his mailbox for him to find. ("Answer 36") The record shuts off.

Jase finds the phone and in the span of 2010 to 2017, he chimes in frequently with new recordings, documenting what has changed and reflecting on his feelings about the situation with Judith as he often finds himself listening back to parts of the record. He discloses that he briefly got together with one of his old partners and they had a kid, Cooper; however, after all this time he still finds himself missing Judith and wishing things could’ve been different. ("Listen Back") He turns off the record.

The record turns on moments later, with Jase excitedly saying that he found Judith's email and typed his remaining questions and answers in a three-page PDF. Jase composes an email with the PDF attached while overthinking what could go wrong with Judith's reaction. ("Attachment")

Later on, he reports that Judith surprisingly responded and invited him to dinner so he can finish the 36 Questions in person. They meet up, Jase finishes the questions, and upon answering the final question by wondering how he can move on from her, the atmosphere becomes melancholy. Jase admits that the truth depends on a person's point of view, and they both come to the conclusion that two sides can both be right. ("The Truth")

The record ends after a few seconds of silence, leaving the aftermath ambiguous.

== Production ==
Skip Bronkie and Zack Akers of Two-Up Productions, the same company behind Limetown, approached Littler and Winter with the parameters of the plot. Littler and Winter dismissed the podcast trope of having an external narrator early in the production process, deciding instead to loop the two singers' voices into harmonies to avoid the need for a chorus. In place of a narrator, each episode is presented as a series of voice memos that Judith records on her phone.

=== Awards ===
Award	Date	Recipient	Category	Result	Ref.
Audio Verse Awards	2017	"A Better Version" by Ellen Winter & Chris Littler	Best Music for a New, Ongoing, Dramatic, Production	Finalist	
Audio Verse Awards	2017	"Hear Me Out" by Ellen Winter & Chris Littler	Best Music for a New, Ongoing, Dramatic, Production	Finalist	
Audio Verse Awards	2017	"The Truth" by Ellen Winter & Chris Littler	Best Music for a New, Ongoing, Dramatic, Production	Finalist	
Audio Verse Awards	2017	Jonathan Groff as Jase Connolly	Best Actor in a Leading Role for a New, Ongoing, Dramatic, Production	Won	

== Planned film adaptation ==
In August 2020, it was announced that Netflix and Chernin Entertainment planned to adapt the podcast into a feature film, with Brett Haley to direct. The script was said to be a collaborative effort between Haley and Marc Basch.
