= The Drummer (2020 film) =

- Poster
- Directed by: Eric Werthman
- Written by: Eric Werthman; Jessica Gohlke
- Produced by: Eric Werthman; Vladan Nikolic
- Starring: Danny Glover
- Cinematography: Marcin Kapron
- Edited by: Erin Greenwell
- Music by: Clare Manchon; Olivier Manchon
- Production companies: N and J Productions
- Distributed by: 1091 Pictures
- Release dates: October 2020 (Woodstock); November 9, 2021
- Country: United States
- Language: English

The Drummer is a 2020 American drama film directed by Eric Werthman and starring Danny Glover, who also serves as an executive producer of the film. The film premiered at the 2020 Woodstock Film Festival.

== Cast ==
- Danny Glover as Mark Walker
- Prema Cruz as Cori
- Sam Underwood as Darien Cooper
- Daniel K. Isaac as Mike
- Camilla Perez as Maria
- Frankie J. Alvarez as Nate
- Jennifer Mudge as Alison Layton
- Lillias White as Roberta
- Nikola Balać as Christian

== Release ==
1091 Pictures acquired North American distribution rights to the film in July 2021. The film was released on November 9, 2021.

== Reception ==
The film has an 80% rating on Rotten Tomatoes based on five reviews.

Bob Strauss of the San Francisco Chronicle gave the film a negative review and wrote, "Defined only by their scars, all three lead characters feel generic, as if Werthman built them out of archetypes that ran through his case studies."

Robert Daniels of RogerEbert.com awarded the film three stars and wrote, "But it flourishes as a modest picture, an acute character study of men and women picking up the pieces of a patriotic ideal that seems to have failed them."

Joel Fisher of Battle Royale With Cheese described The Drummer as "powerful" and “still as relevant now as it ever was.”
