= Chicano (disambiguation) =

Chicano is an ethnic, political, and cultural term used to refer to some Mexican Americans.

It may also refer to:

- El Chicano, a 1970s and 1980s funky music group
- Chicanos (comics), a comic book by Carlos Trillo and Eduardo Risso
- El Chicano, ring name of Puerto Rican professional wrestler Carlos Cotto
- El Chicano (film), a 2019 American superhero film
- Chicanos Motorcycle Club, an outlaw motorcycle club

== See also ==
- Chicana feminism, a branch of feminist thought
- Chicano art, a genre of visual art
- Chicano English, a dialect of American English
- Chicano literature, a literary genre
- the Chicano Moratorium, a 1970 protest march against the Vietnam War
- the Chicano Movement, a United States political and social movement
- Chicano nationalism, a political and cultural ideology
- Chicano Park, a park in San Diego, California
- Chicano poetry, a poetic genre
- Chicano rap, a genre of hip hop music
- Chicano rock, a genre of rock music
- Chicano Studies, an academic discipline
