= Jonathan Groff =

American actor and singer (born 1985)

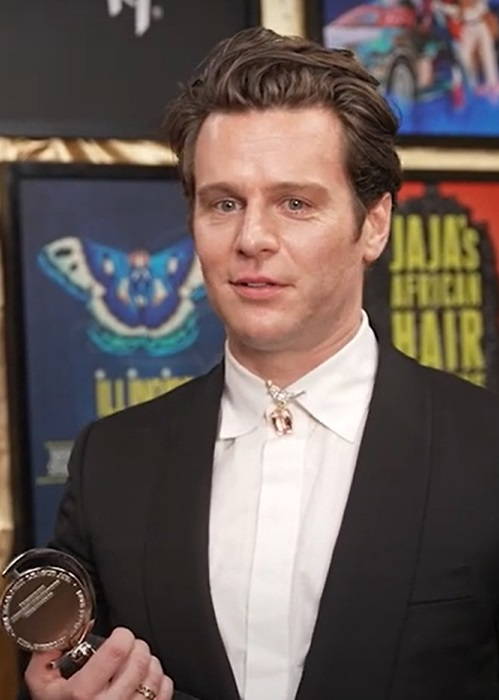
- Groff at the 2024 Tony Awards
- Born: Jonathan Drew Groff; March 26, 1985 (age 41); Lancaster, Pennsylvania, U.S.
- Occupations: Actor; singer
- Years active: 2002–present
- Known for: Spring Awakening; Glee; Hamilton; Frozen; Merrily We Roll Along; Just in Time
- Groff's voice From 2024 Tony Awards acceptance speech

Jonathan Drew Groff (born March 26, 1985) is an American actor and singer. Known for his performances on stage and screen, he has received several accolades including a Tony Award and a Grammy Award as well as a nomination for a Primetime Emmy Award. He was included in the annual Time 100 list of the most influential people in the world in 2026.

He began his career on Broadway making his debut in the musical In My Life (2005). He later received Tony Award nominations for playing Melchior Gabor in the original production of the rock musical Spring Awakening (2006), King George III in the original production of the historical musical Hamilton (2015), and Bobby Darin in the original production of the jukebox musical Just in Time (2025). In 2024, he won the Tony Award for Best Actor in a Musical for playing Franklin Shepard in the musical revival of Stephen Sondheim's Merrily We Roll Along. He also starred as Seymour Krelborn in the off-Broadway musical revival of Little Shop of Horrors in 2019.

On television, he started his career with a recurring guest star as Jesse St. James in the Fox musical-comedy series Glee (2009–15). He starred as Patrick Murray in the HBO comedy-drama series Looking (2014–15), the network's first series centering on the lives of gay men, as well as its subsequent television film, Looking: The Movie (2016). He portrayed FBI Special Agent Holden Ford in the Netflix period crime drama Mindhunter (2017–19). He was Primetime Emmy Award-nominated for his role in the Disney+ live stage recording of Hamilton (2020).

Groff made his film debut playing Michael Lang in Ang Lee's Taking Woodstock (2009). He has since played Louis J. Weichmann in The Conspirator (2010), Smith in The Matrix Resurrections (2021), and a father held hostage in Knock at the Cabin (2023). He also voiced both Kristoff and Sven in the Disney animated Frozen franchise, including Frozen (2013) and Frozen II (2019). In 2022, he executive produced the HBO documentary film Spring Awakening: Those You've Known, which saw the 15-year reunion of the original cast of the musical.

== Early life and education ==
Jonathan Drew Groff was born into a Mennonite family on March 26, 1985, in Lancaster, Pennsylvania, to Julie and Jim Groff, a standardbred horse trainer and driver. He has an older brother, David, who is president and COO of WebstaurantStore.

Groff's roots in theater and acting began at an early age. When he was three years old, Groff fell in love with Julie Andrews' performance as the title character in the film Mary Poppins (1964), and growing up, he and his brother put on childhood home productions, such as a performance of The Wizard of Oz in his father's barn, where he played Dorothy. Groff credits Sutton Foster as one of his greatest influences and idols, and as a young aspiring actor, he would wait at the stage door after her performances to get her autograph. Groff joined his middle school and high school drama departments, and it was there that he became inspired to pursue a career in theater.

In his teens, Groff took part in many community productions in his hometown of Lancaster. At seventeen, he directed and starred in You're a Good Man, Charlie Brown at a high school theater festival at the Fulton Opera House, for which he won a community award. He also performed in The Sound of Music, Ragtime, Cyrano, Evita, My Fair Lady, Peter Pan, The Pirates of Penzance, and Rags at the Fulton Opera House, as well as starring as Edgar in Bat Boy: The Musical and Ugly in Honk! at The Ephrata Performing Arts Center.

Groff graduated from Conestoga Valley High School in 2003 and intended to attend Carnegie Mellon University, but he deferred his admission for a year when he was cast as Rolf in a Non-Equity national tour of The Sound of Music. After the tour, Groff decided to move to New York City instead of attending college and begin his career.

== Career ==
=== 2005–09: Early roles and Spring Awakening ===
Groff started out waiting tables at the Chelsea Grill in New York City before earning his Actors' Equity Association card in 2005, with the musical Fame at the North Shore Music Theatre, where he played Nick Piazza. That same year, he made his Broadway debut as an understudy for the lead role (played by Christopher Hanke), swing, and dance captain for the musical In My Life by Joseph Brooks, opening on October 20 and closing on December 11, 2005, after 61 performances. The musical was panned by critics, with a review from Broadway.com calling the production "undoubtedly the most bizarre, misguided Broadway musical of the millennium".

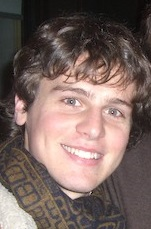
Groff in 2006

His breakout performance occurred in 2006, when Groff originated the lead role of Melchior Gabor in the Broadway production of the rock musical Spring Awakening. The musical tells the story of repressed adolescents in late nineteenth century Germany discovering their sexuality, adapted from Frank Wedekind's original 1891 play by Duncan Sheik and Steven Sater and directed by Michael Mayer. Groff was first cast in a workshop of Spring Awakening at Baruch College with Lea Michele, John Gallagher Jr., and the rest of the original cast, and the production then moved to the Atlantic Theater Company for its original off-Broadway run from May 19 through August 5, 2006, before transferring to Broadway. During the Broadway production at the Eugene O'Neill Theatre, Groff played the role from its debut on December 10, 2006, through May 18, 2008, when he departed the production with co-star and best friend Lea Michele. The musical achieved great critical acclaim, garnering eleven nominations and winning eight awards, including Best Musical, at the 61st Tony Awards. The musical was also awarded the Grammy Award for Best Musical Show Album, which the Grammys did not award to vocalists at that time. Charles Isherwood of The New York Times called the show a "brave new musical, haunting and electrifying by turns" and praised Groff's "ardency and thoughtfulness". Variety wrote that the performances of "Michele, Groff and Gallagher dominate the young ensemble". Groff was nominated for a Drama Desk Award, a Drama League Award, and a Tony Award for Best Leading Actor in a Musical for his performance. He received the Theatre World Award for Outstanding Debut Performance.

In 2007, Groff played the recurring role of Henry Mackler for eleven episodes on the ABC soap opera One Life to Live. His character's storyline about a school shooting was cut due to the Virginia Tech shooting in April 2007. In November 2007, Groff was cast in the FX series Pretty/Handsome, directed and written by Ryan Murphy, and filmed a pilot, but the series was not picked up. In 2007, Groff also lent his vocal talents to record the roles of Rolf Gruber & Friedrich von Trapp in the Salzburg Marionette Theatre's production of The Sound of Music, which premiered on November 7 in Dallas, Texas. This recording is still used by the company for their performances in Salzburg, Austria.

From July 22 through August 31, 2008, Groff played the lead role of Claude in the Shakespeare in the Park production of Hair, a rock musical about hippie counterculture during the Vietnam War that was directed by Diane Paulus. Theater critic Ben Brantley of The New York Times wrote in his review of Hair that "Mr. Groff, who was memorably tormented by young lust in the musical Spring Awakening, is even more affecting here, his open face a shifting map of doubt and affirmation." Groff decided to turn down the opportunity to reprise his role in the Broadway production, choosing instead to make his film debut. In 2009, he appeared as Michael Lang in Ang Lee's comedy-drama film Taking Woodstock, about the 1969 Woodstock Festival. While critics found the film "likable" but "underwhelming", Groff's performance was praised for its "crafty, angelic fervor" by Rolling Stone.

From November 14 to December 21, 2008, Groff appeared as Billy Noone, a closeted gay soldier fighting in Iraq, in the off-Broadway production of Prayer for My Enemy, a play written by Craig Lucas. The production was directed by Bartlett Sher and performed at Playwrights Horizons. Ben Brantley wrote in The New York Times that the play is "muddle-headed" and "disconnected", but Groff "exudes the charismatic aura of distressed youth". From April 10 to May 17, 2009, Groff appeared as Gray Korankyi and Walter Riemann in the off-Broadway production of another Craig Lucas play, The Singing Forest, alongside Olympia Dukakis at the Public Theater. The play, directed by Mark Wing-Davey, was described by critics as "convoluted" in plot but with strong performances, praising Groff for his "natural emotional transparency [that] helps add layers to Gray". For both performances, Groff received an Obie Award.

Groff starred as Dionysus in the play The Bacchae opposite Anthony Mackie from August 11 to 30, 2009; it was directed by JoAnne Akalaitis and produced as a part of the Public Theater's Shakespeare in the Park. The Hollywood Reporter wrote that "Groff is surprisingly effective as the Stranger, Dionysus' human guise", but "in the moments when he must be the immortal god and register his full wrath, however, Groff is less successful despite an earnest effort."

=== 2010–16: Glee, Frozen and Hamilton ===
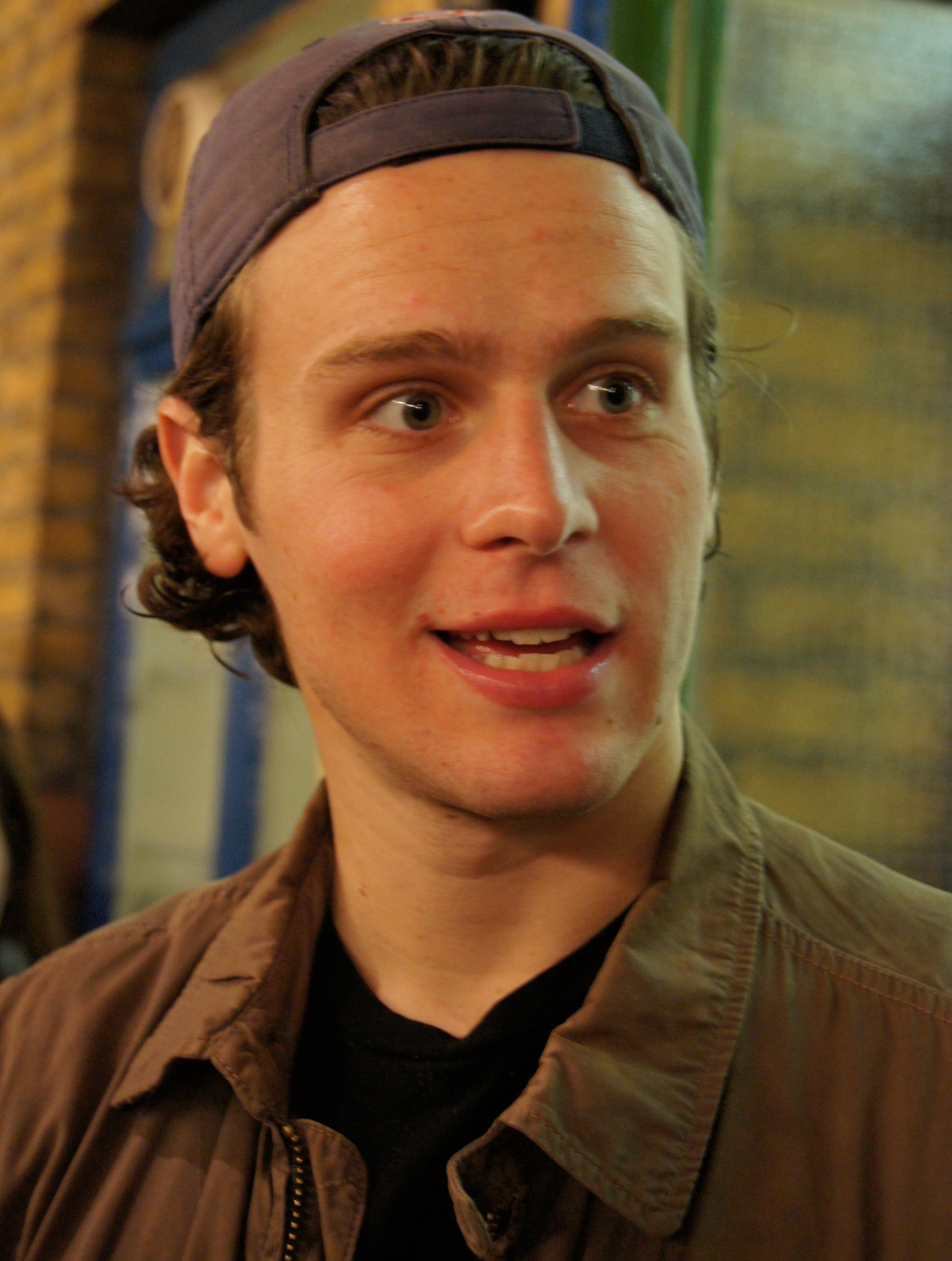
Groff in 2010 in London, at the time for his highly anticipated West End debut. He was starring as Clifford Anderson in the dark comedy-thriller Deathtrap at the Noël Coward Theatre (then called the Albery Theatre), performing alongside acclaimed British actor Simon Russell Beale.

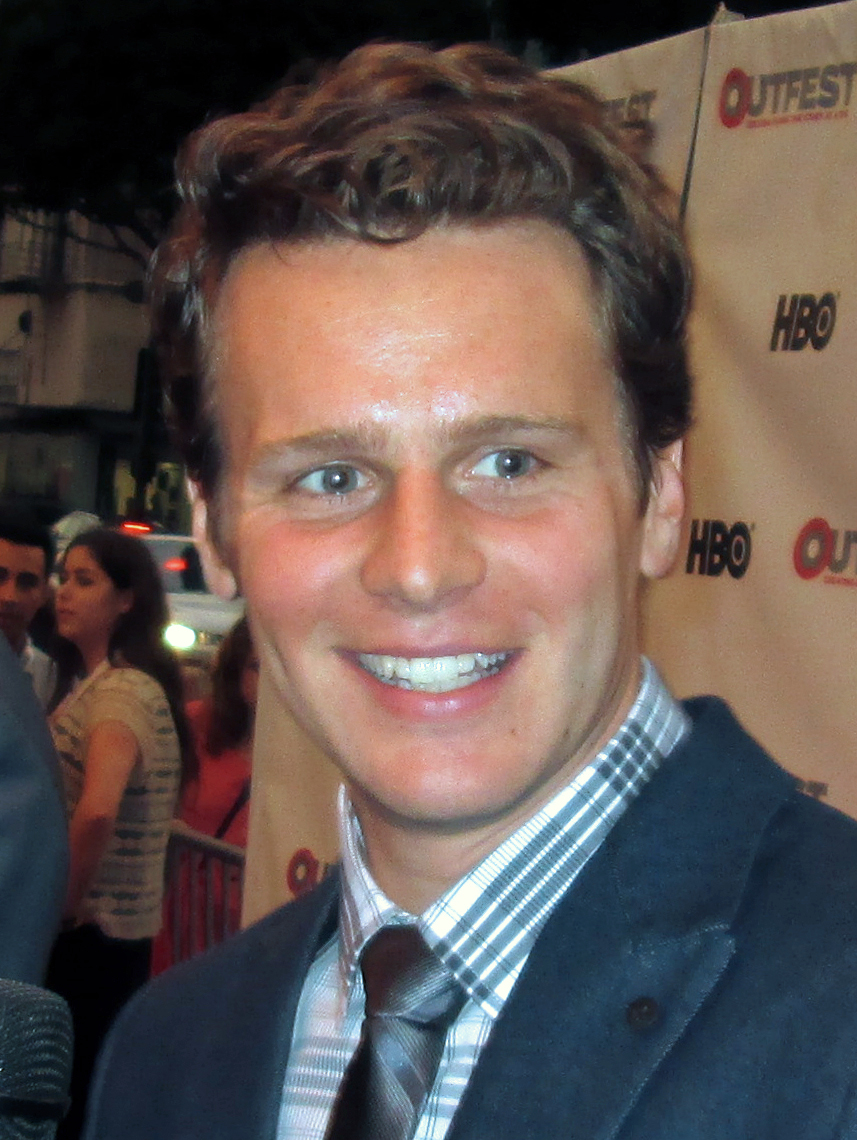
Groff at the red carpet opening of the Outfest on 11 July 2013 in Los Angeles, where he also spoke about his role as Patrick Murray in the new series Looking

Starting in 2010, Groff rose to greater prominence as a recurring guest star in the Fox musical comedy-drama Glee as Jesse St. James, lead performer in rival glee club Vocal Adrenaline and love interest to Rachel Berry, played by Lea Michele. He appeared in a total of fifteen episodes over the first, second, third, and sixth seasons of the series. Groff was featured in four of Glee's soundtrack albums and made a special appearance in the concert tour Glee Live! In Concert! with Michele at the Gibson Amphitheatre in Los Angeles and at the Radio City Music Hall in New York City.

From August 21, 2010, to January 15, 2011, Groff made his West End debut in the London revival of Deathtrap, a play written by Ira Levin and directed by Matthew Warchus at the Noël Coward Theatre. Groff played Clifford Anderson, a young brilliant playwright, starring alongside Simon Russell Beale as Sidney Bruhl, his professor. The play received positive critical reception; The Spectator called Groff's performance "magnetic" and "deeply charismatic" but found the "relationship between student and professor [to be] unconvincing".

Groff also starred in the off-Broadway world premiere of the play The Submission by Jeff Talbott with MCC Theater. The production was directed by Walter Bobbie and performed at the Lucille Lortel Theatre from September 8 to October 22, 2011. He portrayed Danny Larsen, a white playwright who submits his play under the pen name of an African-American woman, alongside Rutina Wesley, who played an actress he hires to pose as the writer. The production was met with mostly positive reviews, with The New York Times praising the script for its "self-awareness" but also finding it "too theatrical" and lacking "real emotions". Groff's acting was widely praised, however, with critics calling his performance "exceptional", "deft", and "disarming".

From August to October 2012, Groff appeared as Ian Todd, a ruthless political aide, in the second and final season of the Starz political drama series Boss. The series was not renewed for a third season due to low ratings. Groff then played Ken, an artist's assistant, opposite Alfred Molina in the Center Theatre Group production of John Logan's play Red. The production ran from August 1 through September 9, 2012, and was directed by Matthew Warchus. From March 14 to 17, 2013, Groff and Molina reprised their roles for six more performances of the play, this time through L.A. Theatre Works and directed by Rosalind Ayres. Charles McNulty of the Los Angeles Times praised Groff's performance for its "admirable clarity" and wrote that "he is every bit as effective in revealing the delicate nuances of [his character]."

In 2013, Groff starred in C.O.G., a comedy-drama film adaptation based on David Sedaris's book of essays, Naked. In the film, Groff plays David, loosely based on Sedaris himself, a young repressed gay man who moves to Oregon in search of a new purpose. The film, directed and written by Kyle Patrick Alvarez, premiered at the Sundance Film Festival on January 20, 2013, and was released in theaters on September 20, 2013, to mixed but mostly positive reviews, with critics citing a "meandering" plot. As Dan Callahan from RogerEbert.com wrote of Groff's performance, "Groff has an innate sweetness and likability about him no matter what he does, and ... brings a yearning to his role that steadily makes this semi-amusing tale of a fish out of water into a serious and often surprising drama". On June 11, 2013, Groff portrayed Frederic, a pirate apprentice, in a one-night-only Shakespeare in the Park gala production of the comic opera The Pirates of Penzance. The production was directed by Ted Sperling at the Delacorte Theater, with other members of the cast including Kevin Kline, Martin Short, and Glenn Close.

In 2013, Groff voiced Kristoff, a rugged mountain man and love interest to Anna, and his reindeer Sven in Disney's animated feature Frozen, alongside Idina Menzel, Kristen Bell, and Josh Gad. The film premiered on November 19, 2013, and later won an Academy Award, Golden Globe, and BAFTA for Best Animated Feature. Following the film's massive commercial success and its ranking as the highest-grossing animated film of all time, the fifteenth highest-grossing film of all time, and the highest-grossing film of 2013, Groff reprised his role in the short film sequel Frozen Fever, which premiered on March 13, 2015. In 2014, Groff was a guest narrator at Disney's Candlelight Processional.

From 2014 to 2015, Groff starred as Patrick Murray, a gay video game developer, in the HBO comedy-drama series Looking, created by Michael Lannan. The first HBO series to center around the lives of gay men, the show depicted a group of gay friends navigating relationships in San Francisco and was praised for its representation of LGBTQ+ characters and experiences. Due to low ratings, the series was canceled after two seasons on March 23, 2015, with the network green-lighting a television film to conclude the story. The film premiered on HBO on July 23, 2016. Groff's performance was well received by critics, with one critic from The New York Times calling Groff's performance "excellent ... Mr. Groff always made his tics, inconsistencies, and operatically scaled mistakes believable."

Groff portrayed Craig Donner in The Normal Heart directed by Ryan Murphy, the film adaptation of Larry Kramer's autobiographical play of the same name, which depicts the New York City AIDS crisis in the 1980s. The Normal Heart was released on May 25, 2014, and won the Critics' Choice Award for Best Movie and the Primetime Emmy Award for Outstanding Television Movie.

Groff returned to the London stage on May 19, 2015, to star as J. Pierrepont Finch in a one-night-only concert of the musical How to Succeed in Business Without Really Trying, at the Royal Festival Hall alongside Cynthia Erivo. One critic from BritishTheatre.com wrote that while the concert lacked "consistent careful handling", Groff was "truly terrific" and "exudes a warmth and comic intelligence which makes him impossible not to watch."

Groff also starred in an Encores! production of the musical A New Brain as Gordon Schwinn, a composer who suffers from arteriovenous malformation, based on the real-life composer William Finn. The production, which took place from June 24 to 27, 2015, was presented as part of the New York City Center's Encores! Off-Center staged concert series and was directed by James Lapine, with Groff performing alongside Aaron Lazar, Dan Fogler, and Ana Gasteyer. Groff was praised for his performance, as one critic from the New York Post says, "Though the musical is uneven, Groff effortlessly keeps the production together with his supple voice and low-key charm."

On March 3, 2015, Groff joined the cast of the hit musical Hamilton by Lin-Manuel Miranda and directed by Thomas Kail, replacing Brian d'Arcy James in the role of King George III. Groff held the role for the remainder of the show's off-Broadway production at the Public Theater through May 3, 2015, and he reprised the role in the Broadway production at the Richard Rodgers Theatre for two stints from July 13 to October 25, 2015, and December 1, 2015, to April 9, 2016, being replaced after the first stint by Andrew Rannells and Rory O'Malley after the second. Ben Brantley of The New York Times called Groff's performance "delicious" and wrote that "His is the voice of vintage Britpop, rendered in a leisurely, ironic, condescending vein to a distant population he regards as savages." Hamilton achieved high critical and commercial success, winning eleven Tony Awards, including Best Musical, and eight Drama Desk Awards. Groff, along with the rest of the cast, won a Grammy Award for Best Musical Theater Album for appearing as a featured performer on the original Broadway cast recording. He was also nominated for the Tony Award for Best Featured Actor in a Musical for his performance as the king.

=== 2017–present: Career expansion ===
In October 2017, Groff starred in the Netflix crime thriller series Mindhunter, created by Joe Penhall and executive produced by David Fincher and Charlize Theron. In the series, Groff portrays Federal Bureau of Investigation agent Holden Ford, a serial killer profiler in the Behavioral Science Unit interviewing and investigating real-life serial killers and murder cases. His character is loosely based on the real-life John E. Douglas, one of the first criminal profilers in FBI history. Groff and co-stars Holt McCallany and Anna Torv also starred in the second season of the series, which premiered on August 16, 2019. The series and Groff's performance were critically acclaimed. RogerEbert.com called it "Netflix's best drama", and Collider wrote that Groff's performance was "exceptionally affecting as Holden" and that "Groff has always had a talent for making his characters empathetic." For his performance, Groff won a Satellite Award for Best Actor in a Drama Series. Season three has since been put on hold indefinitely as Fincher, who directed and produced much of the series, elected to focus on other projects, although he may one day revisit the project.

In July 2017, Groff starred as Jase Connolly in the first podcast musical, 36 Questions, written by Chris Littler and Ellen Winter based on The New York Times article "The 36 Questions That Lead to Love" and a 1997 psychological study on interpersonal closeness. The three-act podcast, released by Two-Up Productions, follows the story of an estranged husband (Groff) and wife (played by Jessie Shelton) trying to salvage their marriage with the titular set of 36 questions. On July 23, 2017, Groff performed in a one-night only symphonic concert production of Sondheim on Sondheim at the Hollywood Bowl. From January 20 to 22, 2018, Groff starred as the titular character in the off-Broadway production of The Bobby Darin Story, a three-day concert and biographical retelling of the life of 1950s singing icon Bobby Darin, presented as part of the Lyrics & Lyricists series at 92nd Street Y and directed by Alex Timbers. The production was met with great critical reception, with Michael Ridel writing in the New York Post that Groff "moves with the ease and slyness of Darin".

From September 17, 2019, to January 19, 2020, Groff starred in the off-Broadway revival of Little Shop of Horrors at the Westside Theatre as Seymour Krelborn, a florist who raises a plant with a thirst for human flesh, alongside Christian Borle and Tammy Blanchard. The revival, directed by Michael Mayer, received rave reviews; The Hollywood Reporter wrote that Groff was "never-better ... hilarious, endearing and in tremendous voice" and that he "disappears into a role he was born to play". Groff was nominated for the Grammy Award for Best Musical Theater Album as part of the cast recording of Little Shop of Horrors. Groff also won an Outer Critics Circle Award, and he received a Lucille Lortel Award nomination and Drama League Award nomination for his performance.

In November 2019, Groff reprised his role as Kristoff in the sequel film Frozen 2, singing a solo song for the movie titled "Lost in the Woods". In January 2020, Frozen 2 surpassed the first installment, becoming the highest-grossing animated film of all time. Groff also reprised the character in the 2017 short Olaf's Frozen Adventure and the video game Kingdom Hearts III in 2019. Groff's Broadway performance of King George III in Hamilton was featured in the film production on Disney+ released on July 3, 2020. In 2021, the film of the musical received a nomination for the Golden Globe Award for Best Motion Picture of a Musical or Comedy. Groff received a nomination for a Primetime Emmy Award for Outstanding Actor in a Supporting Role in a Limited Series or Movie for his performance in the Disney+ live stage recording for his performance in the film. His performance went viral due to his tendency to spray spit while singing. In December 2020, it was announced Groff would be joining the cast of Invincible as Rick Sheridan, an Amazon Prime Video adult animated superhero series based on the comics of the same name created by Robert Kirkman, with the first episodes expected to be released on March 26, 2021.

In December 2019, it was announced Groff would join the cast for The Matrix Resurrections, the fourth installment of The Matrix franchise, alongside Keanu Reeves, Carrie-Anne Moss, and Yahya Abdul-Mateen II, portraying former Agent Smith (replacing Hugo Weaving). It was released in theaters and on HBO Max on December 22, 2021. In 2021, it was announced Groff would be executive producing a concert documentary following the fifteen-year reunion of the original Broadway cast of Spring Awakening. The documentary, entitled Spring Awakening: Those You've Known, premiered on HBO on May 3, 2022. In addition, he hosted the documentary Broadway: Beyond the Golden Age on PBS. In November 2020, Deadline announced Groff would star as Brian in Molly and the Moon, a musical film alongside Frozen co-star Kristen Bell. In March 2021, Netflix announced Groff would star in the live-action/animation hybrid series Lost Ollie directed by Peter Ramsey based on William Joyce and Brandon Oldenburg's book Ollie's Odyssey. The series premiered on Netflix on August 24, 2022. Groff voices the title role of Ollie, a lost toy searching for the boy who lost him.

Groff starred in the role of Franklin Shepard in the 2022 New York Theatre Workshop off-Broadway revival of Stephen Sondheim's Merrily We Roll Along alongside Daniel Radcliffe and Lindsay Mendez. In December 2022, it was announced that he would reprise his role in the first Broadway revival of the musical in fall of 2023, for which he received a Tony Award for Best Actor in a Musical. In March 2022, Deadline announced Groff had been cast in M. Night Shyamalan's horror film Knock at the Cabin. In 2023, Groff was announced as a guest star in the fourteenth series of Doctor Who. In 2024, Groff co-starred with Karan Soni in the romantic comedy film A Nice Indian Boy, playing Jay Kurundkar opposite Soni's character Naveen Gavaskar. In 2025, Groff starred on Broadway in Just in Time, a musical about Bobby Darin, for which he received his fourth Tony Award nomination. He worked on a concert version of the project with director Alex Timbers in 2018 when titled The Bobby Darin Story.

In September 2026, Groff had his RSC debut as Rosalind in an all-male production of William Shakespeare's As You Like It for the Royal Shakespeare Company in Stratford-upon-Avon, directed by the RSC's co-Artistic Director Daniel Evans.

== Personal life ==
In 2019, Groff purchased a home next to his father's horse farm in Christiana, Pennsylvania. He splits his time between Pennsylvania and New York City.

=== Health ===
Groff was diagnosed with melanoma in his early 20s and underwent surgery for removal. He abstains from using social media and is a practitioner of Transcendental Meditation.

=== Coming out and LGBTQ+ activism ===
Groff publicly came out as gay when asked by a Broadway.com reporter during the National Equality March in October 2009. He later shared his experience with coming out, discussing the pain of being closeted and the knowledge that disclosing his sexuality could have negative ramifications on his career. He has also expressed how much he values being a role model for young people as an out actor, and has advocated the importance of sharing coming-out stories.

Groff was initially hesitant to accept the lead role in the gay television series Looking, citing insecurities around being typecast in gay roles, but he ultimately found the experience rewarding: "Living in that world and talking about gay issues was truly life-altering for me and made me so much more comfortable in my own skin". On June 29, 2014, Groff was a grand marshal at the New York City Gay Pride Parade.

In April 2015, Groff was honored by the Point Foundation with the Point Horizon Award honoring a "trailblazer who has taken a leadership role as an advocate" of LGBTQIA communities. In December 2015, he was honored by Equality Pennsylvania with the Bayard Rustin Award, which "recognizes a Pennsylvanian who is continuing the work to ensure that the LGBT community will be visible, accepted, and celebrated in our society". In 2017, Groff was named Out100's Entertainer of the Year, celebrating impactful LGBTQ+ public figures.

=== Relationships ===
In 2009, Groff dated actor Gavin Creel. From 2010 to 2013, Groff was in a relationship with actor Zachary Quinto. Groff dated New Zealand choreographer Corey Baker from 2018 to 2020. As of 2026, Groff is in a relationship with someone who is outside the acting industry.

=== Charity and community work ===
While Groff was beginning his professional career in theater, he volunteered for the nonprofit Broadway Cares, and he has continued to perform in and support fundraisers for the organization throughout his career. Groff is a longtime supporter of the Elton John AIDS Foundation, serving as an Event Chair for the charity's 14th Annual New York Benefit Gala in 2015. Other charities he has supported include the Point Foundation, Habitat for Humanity, Actors Fund of America, Theatre Development Fund, Hispanic Federation Emergency Assistance Fund, and Color of Change, through which he participates in benefit performances and fundraisers, often recording personal voicemails as his Frozen characters Kristoff and Sven for auction winners. In August 2020, Groff joined the Hamilton cast in organizing the virtual fundraiser event Ham4Change for organizations working to end systemic racism, raising over $1 million for the Equal Justice Initiative, African American Policy Forum, Black Emotional and Mental Health Collective, Black AIDS Institute, Color of Change, Dance4Hope, Know Your Rights Camp, Law Enforcement Accountability Project, Until Freedom, and When We All Vote.

Groff has performed in numerous charity benefits for theater institutions, including the 52nd Street Project, Tectonic Theater Project, Hole in the Wall Gang Camp, Playwrights Horizons, and more. He has expressed a passion in encouraging youth theater; Groff has taught master classes in acting and musical theatre for young actors with the New York Film Academy, Broadway Workshop, Temple University, Young Actors' Theatre Camp, and the National YoungArts Foundation, among others.

On October 3, 2020, Groff participated in a virtual event for the Pennsylvania Democratic Party. On October 16, 2020, Groff, along with the rest of the original Hamilton cast, participated in a virtual fundraiser event for the Biden Victory Fund, in support of Democratic candidate Joe Biden for the 2020 presidential election. On December 13, 2020, Groff and fellow Hamilton cast-member Sasha Hutchings hosted a virtual holiday concert fundraiser to support the campaigns of Jon Ossoff and Raphael Warnock in the Georgia Senate runoff elections. In October 2024, it was announced that Groff had joined the Broadway Cares/Equity Fights AIDS Board of Trustees.

== Acting credits ==
=== Film ===
Key
†	Denotes films that have not yet been released

Year	Title	Role	Notes	Ref.
2009	Taking Woodstock	Michael Lang		
2010	Twelve Thirty	Jeff		
2010	The Conspirator	Louis Weichmann		
2013	C.O.G.	David		
2013	Frozen	Kristoff (voice)	Animated film	
2014	Russian Broadway Shut Down	Nikolai the Athlete	Animated short film	
2014	Sophie	Ben	Short film	
2014	American Sniper	Young Vet Mads		
2015	Frozen Fever	Kristoff (voice)	Animated short film	
2017	Olaf's Frozen Adventure	Kristoff (voice)	Animated short film	
2019	Frozen 2	Kristoff (voice)	Animated film	
2021	The Matrix Resurrections	Smith		
2023	Knock at the Cabin	Eric		
2023	Once Upon a Studio	Kristoff (voice)	Animated short film	
2024	A Nice Indian Boy	Jay Kurundkar		
2024	Ultraman: Rising	Ollie (voice)	Animated film	
2025	Merrily We Roll Along	Franklin Shepard	Live stage recording of musical	
2027	Frozen 3 †	Kristoff (voice)	Animated film; in production	
TBA	Octet †	Henry	Filming	
TBA	Trust the Man †	TBA	Post-production	

=== Television ===
Year	Title	Role	Notes	Ref.
2007	One Life to Live	Henry Mackler	11 episodes	
2008	Pretty/Handsome	Patrick Fitzpayne	Unaired pilot	
2010–2015	Glee	Jesse St. James	Recurring role; 15 episodes	
2012	The Good Wife	Jimmy Fellner	Episode: "Live from Damascus"	
2012	Boss	Ian Todd	Main cast; 10 episodes	
2014–2015	Looking	Patrick Murray	Lead role; 18 episodes	
2014	The Normal Heart	Craig Donner	Television film	
2016	Looking: The Movie	Patrick Murray	Television film	
2016	LEGO Frozen Northern Lights	Kristoff (voice)	Television special	
2017–2019	Mindhunter	Holden Ford	Lead role; 19 episodes	
2018	The Simpsons	Actor Playing Bart (voice)	Episode: "Bart's Not Dead"	
2020	Hamilton	King George III of the United Kingdom	Filmed recording of 2016 Broadway musical	
2021	Invincible	Rick Sheridan (voice)	Episode: "You Look Kinda Dead"	
2022	And Just Like That...	Dr. Paul David	Episode: "Diwali"	
2022	Life & Beth	Travis	Episode: "Pancakes"	
2022	Spring Awakening: Those You've Known	Himself	Documentary, also executive producer	
2022	Lost Ollie	Ollie (voice)	Lead role	
2024–2025	Doctor Who	Rogue	Episodes: "Rogue"; "Wish World"	
2025	Étoile	Kevin	Episode: "The Slip"	

=== Theater ===
Year	Title	Role	Venue	Notes	Ref.
2002	Honk!	Ugly	The Ephrata Performing Arts Center		
2004	Bat Boy: The Musical	Bat Boy	The Ephrata Performing Arts Center		
2005	Fame	Nick Piazza	North Shore Music Theatre		
2005	In My Life	u/s J.T. & Nick, Swing, Dance Captain	Music Box Theatre	Broadway debut	
2006	Spring Awakening	Melchior Gabor	Atlantic Theater Company	Off-Broadway	
2006–2009	Spring Awakening	Melchior Gabor	Eugene O'Neill Theatre	Broadway	
2007	Hair	Claude Hooper Bukowski	Delacorte Theater	40th Anniversary Concert	
2008	Hair	Claude Hooper Bukowski	Delacorte Theater		
2008	Prayer for My Enemy	Billy Noone	Playwrights Horizons	Off-Broadway	
2009	The Singing Forest	Gray Korankyi, Walter Rieman	The Public Theater	Off-Broadway	
2009	The Bacchae	Dionysus	Delacorte Theater		
2010–2011	Deathtrap	Clifford Anderson	Noël Coward Theatre	West End debut	
2011	The Submission	Danny Larsen	MCC Theater	Off-Broadway	
2012	Red	Ken	Mark Taper Forum		
2013	Red	Ken	L.A. Theatre Works		
2013	The Pirates of Penzance	Frederic	Delacorte Theater		
2015	Hamilton	King George III	The Public Theater	Off-Broadway	
2015	How to Succeed in Business Without Really Trying	J. Pierrepont Finch	Royal Festival Hall	West End	
2015	A New Brain	Gordon Michael Schwinn	New York City Center	Encores!	
2015–2016	Hamilton	King George III	Richard Rodgers Theatre	Broadway	
2017	Sondheim on Sondheim	Performer	Hollywood Bowl		
2017	Hair	Claude Hooper Bukowski	Lincoln Center	Jazz at Lincoln Center	
2018	The Bobby Darin Story	Bobby Darin	92nd Street Y	Off-Broadway Concert	
2019–2020	Little Shop of Horrors	Seymour Krelborn	Westside Theatre	Off-Broadway revival	
2021	Spring Awakening	Melchior Gabor	Imperial Theatre	Broadway Reunion Concert	
2022–2023	Merrily We Roll Along	Franklin Shepard	New York Theatre Workshop	Off-Broadway revival	
2023	Gutenberg! The Musical!	The Producer	James Earl Jones Theatre	Broadway one night cameo	
2023–2024	Merrily We Roll Along	Franklin Shepard	Hudson Theatre	Broadway revival	
2025–2026	Just in Time	Bobby Darin	Circle in the Square Theatre	Broadway	
2026	As You Like It	Rosalind	Royal Shakespeare Theatre	Royal Shakespeare Company, Stratford-upon-Avon	

=== Web ===
Year	Title	Role	Notes	Ref.
2008	The Battery's Down	Himself	Web series • Episode: "The Big Apple"	
2009	The Battery's Down	Himself	Web series • Episode: "The Party's Over"	
2015	One True Pairing (Season 1)	Dennis	Web series • Episode: "What's 'Your' Nickname"	
2016	One True Pairing (Season 2)	Dennis	Web series • 4 episodes	
2017	36 Questions	Jase	Podcast Musical • Released through Two-Up podcast channel	

=== Video games ===
Year	Title	Voice role	Ref.
2019	Kingdom Hearts III	Kristoff	
2023	Disney Speedstorm	Kristoff	

== Discography ==
=== Cast recordings ===
- 2006: Spring Awakening (Original Broadway Cast Recording)
- 2010: Glee: The Music, The Power of Madonna
- 2010: Glee: The Music, Volume 3 Showstoppers
- 2010: Glee: The Music, Journey to Regionals
- 2011: Glee: The Music, Volume 6
- 2013: Frozen (Original Motion Picture Soundtrack)
- 2015: Hamilton (Original Broadway Cast Recording)
- 2016: A New Brain (2015 New York Cast Recording)
- 2017: 36 Questions: Songs from Act 1 – EP
- 2017: 36 Questions: Songs from Act 2 – EP
- 2017: 36 Questions: Songs from Act 3 – EP
- 2017: Olaf's Frozen Adventure
- 2019: Frozen 2 (Original Motion Picture Soundtrack)
- 2019: Little Shop of Horrors (The New Off-Broadway Cast Album)
- 2023: Merrily We Roll Along (New Broadway Cast Recording)
- 2025: Just in Time (Original Broadway Cast Recording)

=== Other recordings ===
- 2007: "Now" from Dreaming Wide Awake: The Music of Scott Alan
- 2015: "Prayer" from A View of the River: 7 Songs by Will Van Dyke & Jeff Talbott
- 2015: "Making Today a Perfect Day" from Frozen Fever
- 2019: "I'll Be Home for Christmas" by Lea Michele
- 2021: "Love Me for an Hour" from Some Lovers (World Premiere Recording)

=== Audiobooks ===
- 2008: Broadway Nights by Seth Rudetsky
- 2013: Red by John Logan
- 2015: Frozen Fever by VA
- 2019: The Killer Across the Table by John E. Douglas, Mark Olshaker
- 2022: Everything Was Possible: The Birth of the Musical Follies by Ted Chapin

=== Featured singles ===
Year	Title	Peak chart positions					Album
Year	Title	US	AUS	CAN	IRE	UK	Album
2010	"Highway to Hell"	—	—	88	—	89	Glee: The Music, The Complete Season One
2010	"Run Joey Run"	61	64	45	12	27	Glee: The Music, The Complete Season One
2010	"Another One Bites the Dust"	79	—	53	41	101	Glee: The Music, The Complete Season One
2010	"Bohemian Rhapsody"	—	—	—	—	—	Glee: The Music, The Complete Season One
2010	"Hello"	35	79	37	31	35	Glee: The Music, Volume 3 Showstoppers
2010	"Total Eclipse of the Heart"	16	28	17	3	9	Glee: The Music, Volume 3 Showstoppers
2010	"Like a Virgin"	87	99	83	47	58	Glee: The Music, The Power of Madonna
2010	"Like a Prayer"	27	28	27	2	16	Glee: The Music, The Power of Madonna
2011	"Rolling in the Deep"	29	—	—	—	49	Glee: The Music, Volume 6
2015	"You'll Be Back"	— (Note: "You'll Be Back" did not enter the Hot 100, but peaked at number 21 on the Digital Songs chart.)	—	—	—	—	Hamilton
"—" denotes a recording that did not chart or was not released in the region

Footnotes

== Awards and nominations ==
Year	Award	Category	Work	Result	Ref
2007	Tony Award	Best Actor in a Musical	Spring Awakening	Nominated	
2007	Drama Desk Award	Outstanding Actor in a Leading Role in a Musical	Spring Awakening	Nominated	
2007	Drama League Award	Distinguished Performance	Spring Awakening	Nominated	
2007	Theatre World Award	Outstanding Debut Performance	Spring Awakening	Won	
2009	Obie Award	Outstanding Performance	Prayer for My Enemy; The Singing Forest	Won	
2014	EWwy Award	Best Actor in a Comedy Series	Looking	Nominated	
2014	NewNowNext Award	Best New Television Actor	Looking	Won	
2015	Point Horizon Award		LGBTQ activism	Honoree	
2015	Bayard Rustin Award		LGBTQ activism	Honoree	
2016	Tony Award	Best Featured Actor in a Musical	Hamilton	Nominated	
2016	Grammy Award	Best Musical Theater Album	Hamilton	Won	
2017	Out100 Award	Entertainer of the Year	LGBTQ activism	Honoree	
2017	Satellite Award	Best Actor in a Drama / Genre Series	Mindhunter	Won	
2018	Dorian Award	TV Performance of the Year – Actor	Mindhunter	Nominated	
2020	Satellite Award	Best Actor in a Drama / Genre Series	Mindhunter	Nominated	
2020	Lucille Lortel Award	Outstanding Lead Actor in a Musical	Little Shop of Horrors	Nominated	
2020	Drama League Award	Distinguished Performance	Little Shop of Horrors	Nominated	
2020	Outer Critics Circle Award	Outstanding Actor in a Leading Role in a Musical	Little Shop of Horrors	Honoree	
2020	Grammy Award	Best Musical Theater Album	Little Shop of Horrors	Nominated	
2021	Primetime Emmy Award	Outstanding Supporting Actor in a Limited or Anthology Series or Movie	Hamilton	Nominated	
2022	Disney Legends Award	Honored as a Disney Legend for his "extraordinary contribution to the Disney legacy"		Honoree	
2023	Drama Desk Award	Outstanding Lead Performance in a Musical	Merrily We Roll Along	Nominated	
2023	Outer Critics Circle Award	Outstanding Lead Performer in an Off-Broadway Musical	Merrily We Roll Along	Won	
2024	Tony Award	Best Actor in a Musical	Merrily We Roll Along	Won	
2024	Drama League Award	Distinguished Performance	Merrily We Roll Along	Nominated	
2024	Drama League Award	Distinguished Achievement in Musical Theater Award		Honoree	
2025	Grammy Award	Best Musical Theater Album	Merrily We Roll Along	Nominated	
2025	Tony Awards	Best Actor in a Musical	Just in Time	Nominated	
2025	Drama Desk Award	Outstanding Lead Performance in a Musical	Just in Time	Nominated	
2025	Drama League Award	Distinguished Performance	Just in Time	Nominated	
2025	Dorian Award	Outstanding Lead Performance in a Broadway Musical	Just in Time	Nominated	
2025	Dorian Award	LGBTQ Theater Artist of the Season		Won	
2026	Grammy Awards	Best Musical Theater Album	Just in Time	Nominated	

== See also ==
- LGBTQ culture in New York City
- List of LGBTQ people in New York City
- List of people from New York City
- NYC Pride March
