= Looking (TV series) =

2014 American comedy-drama television series

- Genre: Comedy drama
- Created by: Michael Lannan
- Based on: Lorimer by Michael Lannan
- Starring: Jonathan Groff; Frankie J. Alvarez; Murray Bartlett; Lauren Weedman; Russell Tovey; Raúl Castillo
- Country of origin: United States
- Original language: English
- No. of seasons: 2
- No. of episodes: 18 plus special (list of episodes)

Production
- Executive producers: Michael Lannan; David Marshall Grant; Sarah Condon; Andrew Haigh
- Producer: Kat Landsberg
- Production location: San Francisco
- Cinematography: Reed Morano (season 1); Xavier Pérez Grobet (season 2)
- Editors: Jonathan Alberts; Andrew Dickler
- Camera setup: Single
- Running time: 30 minutes 86 minutes (2016 special)
- Production company: Fair Harbor Productions

Original release
- Network: HBO
- Release: January 19, 2014 – July 23, 2016

Looking is an American comedy-drama television series that aired on HBO from January 19, 2014, to July 23, 2016. It was created by Michael Lannan, with Lannan, Andrew Haigh, David Marshall Grant, and Sarah Condon serving as executive producers. The show stars Jonathan Groff, Frankie J. Alvarez, Murray Bartlett, Lauren Weedman, Russell Tovey, and Raúl Castillo. It centers on the lives of Patrick, Agustín, and Dom—three gay men living and working in modern-day San Francisco. Looking marked HBO's first television series focused primarily on the lives of gay men.

The series received critical acclaim for its writing, direction, and performances, as well as for its grounded, nuanced portrayal of LGBTQ life. Ten of the show's eighteen episodes were directed by Andrew Haigh, whose naturalistic filmmaking style drew comparisons to his 2011 film Weekend and to the mumblecore movement in independent cinema.

Despite strong critical reception, the series struggled with viewership. The second-season finale drew just 298,000 viewers, which led HBO to cancel the series after two seasons. To provide closure, the network commissioned a feature-length television film, Looking: The Movie, which premiered at the Frameline Film Festival on June 26, 2016, and later aired on HBO on July 23, 2016.

In retrospective rankings, Looking has been recognized for its cultural impact and storytelling. In 2019, The Guardian included the series in its list of the "100 Greatest TV Shows of the 21st Century". In 2022, Esquire ranked it #21 in its list of "The Best HBO Series of All Time".

== Premise ==
Set in contemporary San Francisco, Looking follows the lives of three close friends as they navigate relationships, careers, and personal growth in the city's vibrant LGBTQ community.

Patrick Murray, a 29-year-old video game designer, lives with his friend Agustín. Patrick is well-meaning but often naïve, and has had limited success in his romantic life. His circumstances begin to shift when he meets Richie, a charming and grounded barber from the Mission District, and is simultaneously drawn to his new boss, Kevin, who is attractive but in a committed relationship.

Dom, an aspiring restaurateur, works to realize his dream of opening his own establishment. With support from his loyal roommate, Doris, and the unexpected guidance of Lynn, a successful older entrepreneur, Dom begins taking steps toward professional independence.

Agustín, who works as an artist's assistant, struggles with the stability of his relationship with his long-term boyfriend Frank, his creative stagnation, and his growing reliance on recreational drugs.

The series explores the interconnected lives of the three men as they confront questions of love, ambition, friendship, and identity in a rapidly evolving urban landscape.

== Cast and characters ==
=== Main ===
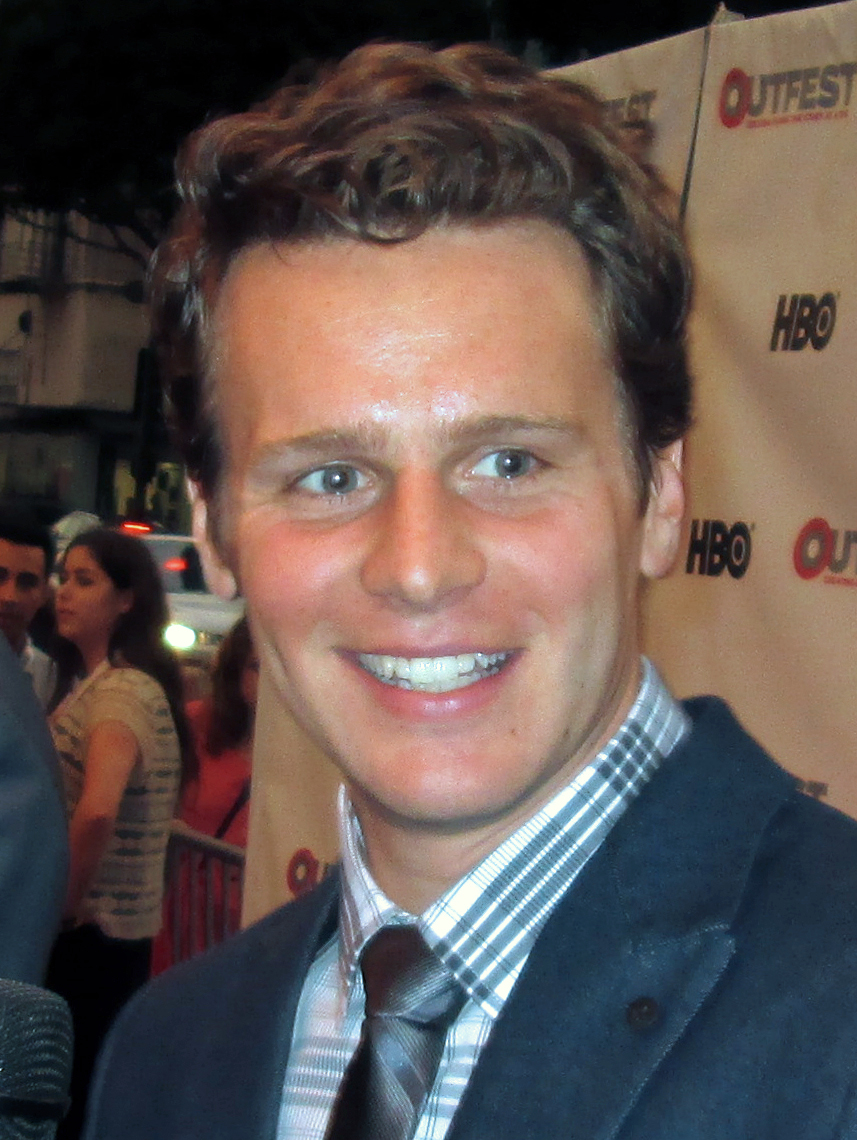
Actor Jonathan Groff, who portrayed Patrick Murray, at the red carpet opening of the Outfest on 11 July 2013 in Los Angeles, where he also spoke about the new series

- Jonathan Groff as Patrick Murray, a 29-year-old video game designer who grew up in suburban Denver in a conservative family who initially had a hard time accepting his sexuality when he came out to them on Thanksgiving back in 2005 while in his second year of college.
- Frankie J. Alvarez as Agustín Lanuez, 31, an artist's assistant and Patrick's best friend since their college days at The University of California, Berkeley. Agustín is from Coral Gables, Florida, outside Miami, and grew up in an affluent Cuban American household from which he is estranged due to the emotional and physical abuse he suffered at the hands of his alcoholic father as a child.
- Murray Bartlett as Dom Basaluzzo, 39, a sommelier in a gastronomic restaurant. Dom was raised by a single father who died when Dom was in his early twenties.
- Lauren Weedman as Doris (season 2, recurring season 1), Dom's best friend since their high school days in Modesto, who now works as a nurse; she and Dom dated during high school before he came out. Doris grew up with a father who was very loving as well as a mother who was emotionally abusive due to mental illness.
- Russell Tovey as Kevin Matheson (season 2, recurring season 1), Patrick's boss, a "video-game wunderkind". Kevin has feelings for Patrick—though he is in a long-term relationship with Jon. In season two, Kevin becomes Patrick's new love interest.
- Raúl Castillo as Ricardo "Richie" Donado Ventura (season 2, recurring season 1), a barber and Patrick's part-time romantic interest. Richie grew up in a large working class Mexican-American family in San Leandro just outside of San Francisco and is currently estranged from his father due to his father's refusal to accept his sexuality.

=== Recurring ===
- Scott Bakula as Lynn, an entrepreneur who strikes a connection with Dom
- O. T. Fagbenle as Frank, Agustín's long-term boyfriend
- Andrew Law as Owen, Patrick's co-worker
- Ptolemy Slocum as Hugo (season 1), Dom's co-worker
- Joseph Williamson as Jon, Kevin's boyfriend
- Daniel Franzese as Eddie (season 2), a bear who becomes Agustín's love interest
- Chris Perfetti as Brady (season 2), Richie's new boyfriend
- Bashir Salahuddin as Malik (season 2), Doris's love interest

== Production ==
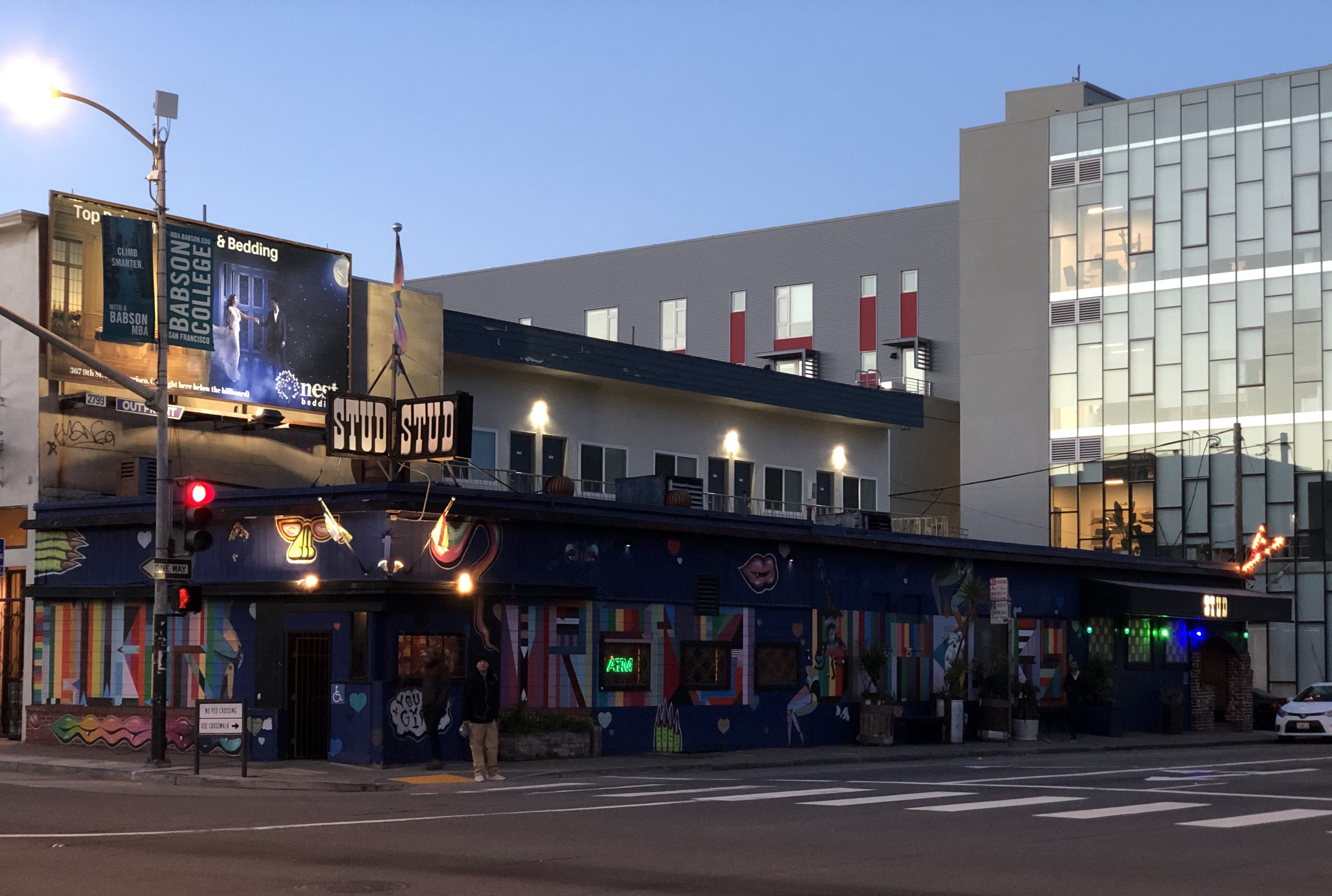
The Stud bar at 9th St and Harrison St in South of Market, San Francisco (2019)

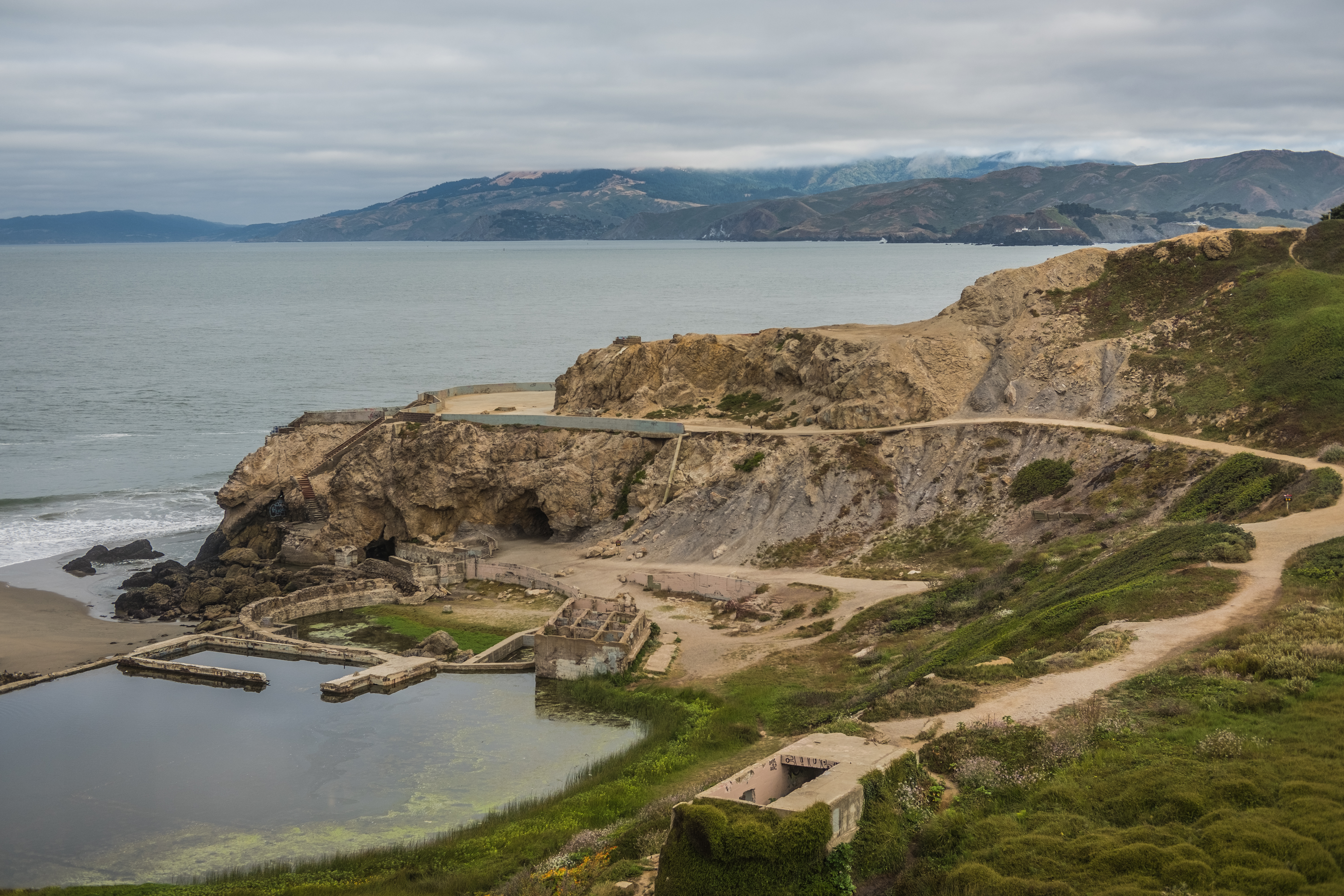
Sutro Baths, where Patrick and Richie go on a date in "Looking for the Future"

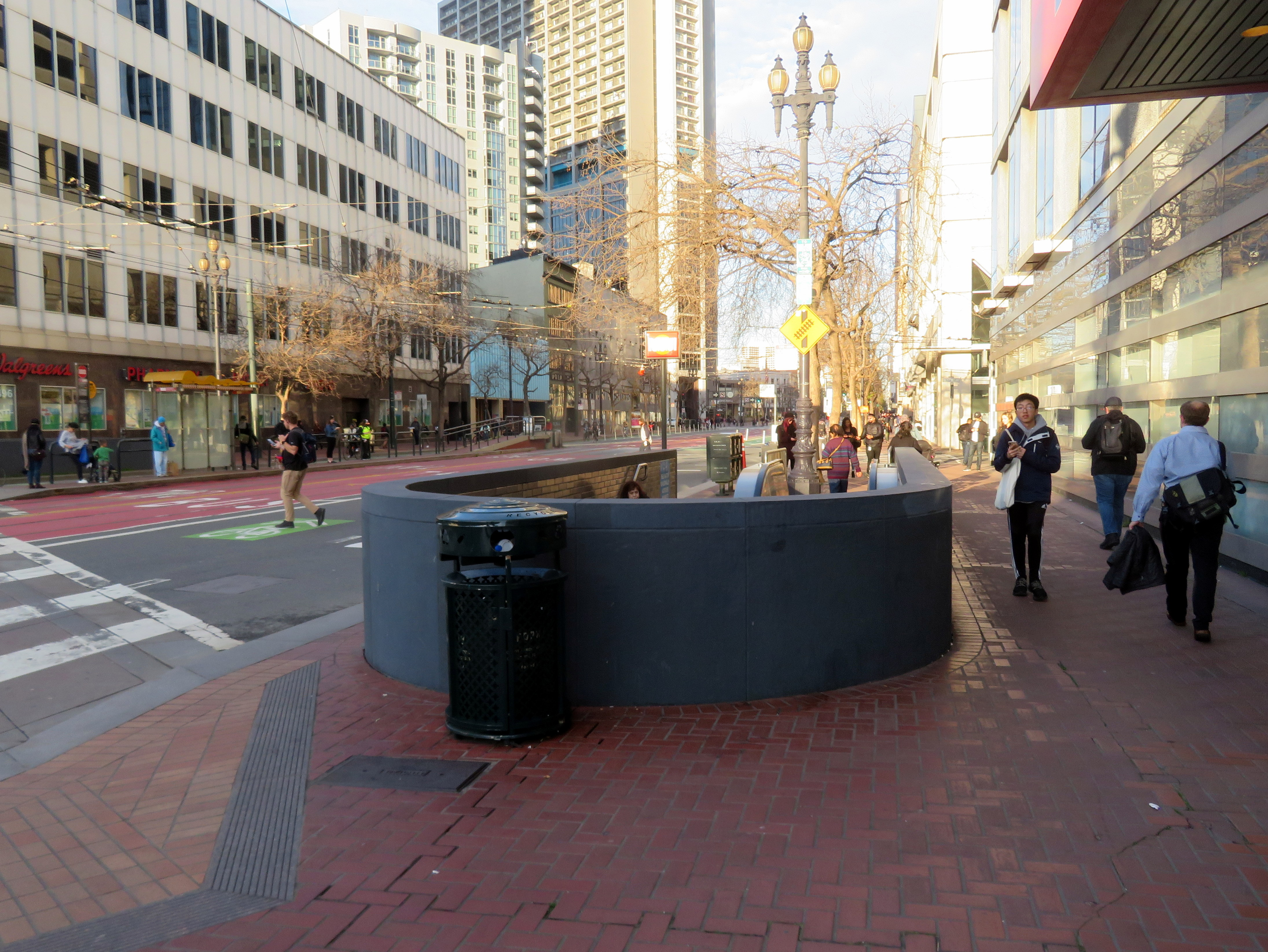
Van Ness station exit next to 1525 Market Street, where the goodbye between Kevin and Patrick took place

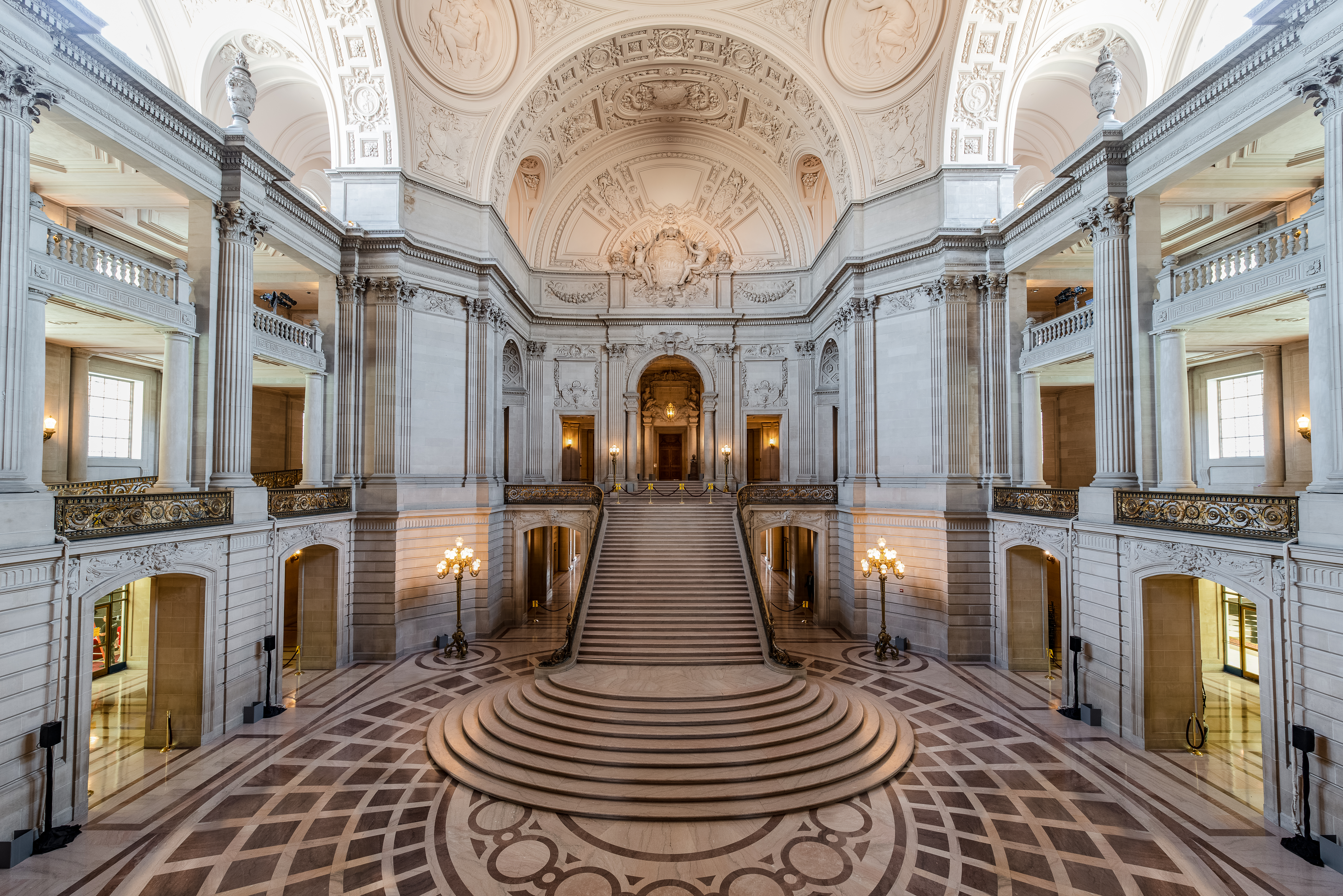
The wedding scene took place under the ceremonial rotunda outside the Board of Supervisors chamber at San Francisco City Hall in front of the bronze bust of Harvey Milk.

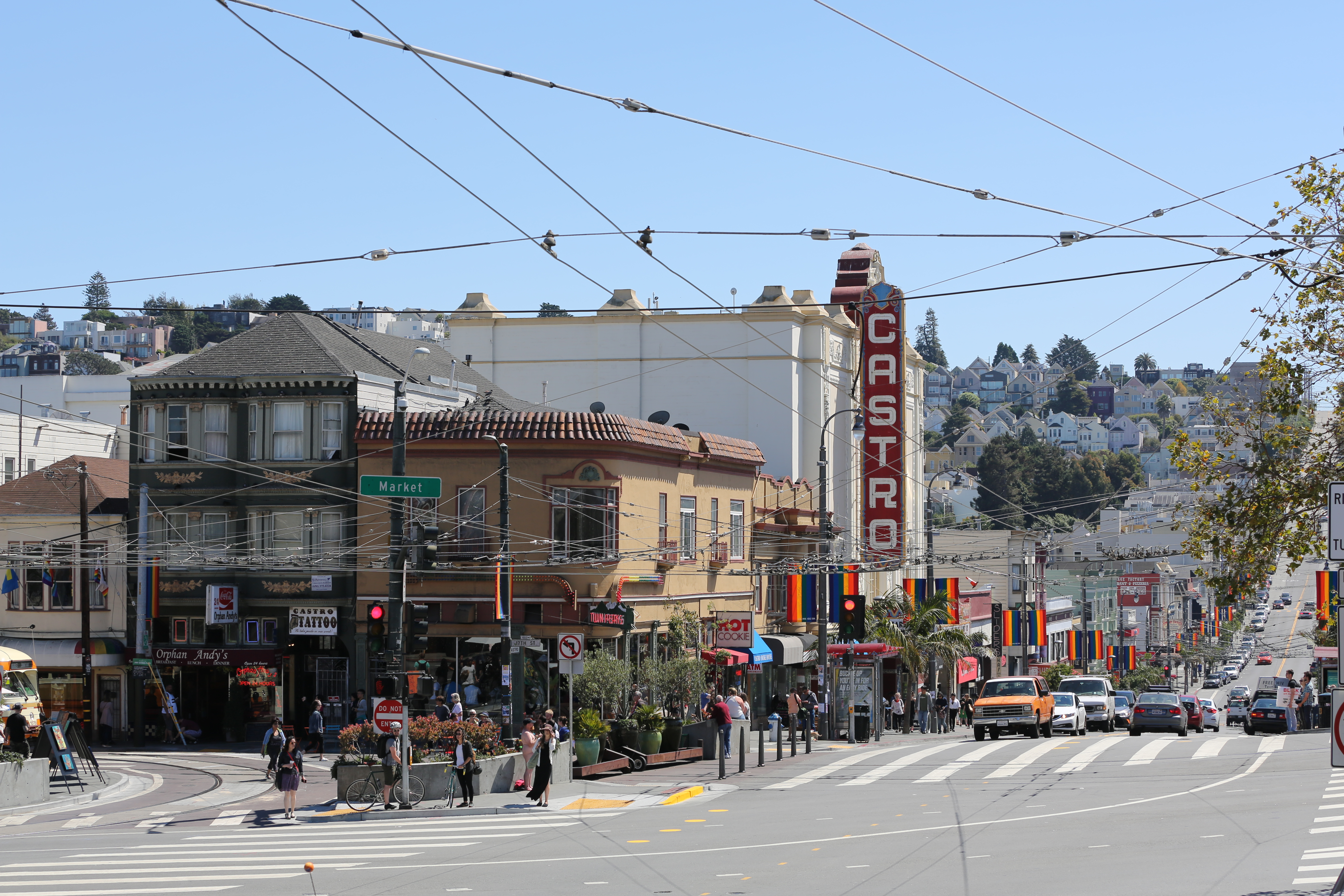
View towards Castro Theatre and to the left Orphan Andy's diner, where the last scene of the film took place (2016)

HBO ordered an eight-episode first season of Looking on May 14, 2013. The pilot episode was written by series creator Michael Lannan, based on his 2011 short film Lorimer, and directed by Andrew Haigh. Principal photography for the first season began in the San Francisco Bay Area on September 16, 2013, and concluded on November 7, 2013. The series premiered on January 19, 2014.

In February 2014, Lannan confirmed that the writers were already exploring ideas for a potential second season. This was supported by Nick Hall, HBO's director of comedy, who noted that the network was not focused solely on initial live viewership, emphasizing that total audience metrics—including On Demand and HBO Go—were also considered indicators of performance.

On February 26, 2014, HBO officially renewed Looking for a second season. The second season premiered on January 11, 2015.

Despite critical acclaim, the series was canceled following its second season due to declining ratings. In response, fans launched an online petition advocating for the continuation of the show. HBO later confirmed that a feature-length film would be produced to provide closure to the series. Cast member Raúl Castillo revealed in an interview with Vulture that filming for the film was scheduled to begin in September 2015 and that the runtime would be approximately two hours. The film premiered on June 2, 2016, at the Frameline Film Festival in San Francisco and was subsequently broadcast on HBO on July 23, 2016.

Both seasons and the feature-length film participated in the San Francisco "Scene in San Francisco Incentive Program" administered by the San Francisco Film Commission.

Filming locations in the first season included the USS Hornet Museum, the Morrison Planetarium, Zuni Café, the Stud bar, and Mission Dolores Park. The area around Castro Theatre, such as Orphan Andy's diner, was where the last scene was shot. The goodbye scene between Patrick and Kevin took place at the Van Ness station entrance next to 1525 Market Street building. Their last coffee was filmed at Philz's in Dogpatch on 1258 Minnesota Street. The wedding scene in the film took place under the ceremonial rotunda outside the Board of Supervisors chamber at San Francisco City Hall in front of the bronze bust of Harvey Milk.

== Episodes ==
Season	Episodes	Originally aired	
Season	Episodes	First aired	Last aired
1	8	January 19, 2014	March 9, 2014
2	10	January 11, 2015	March 22, 2015
The Movie		June 26, 2016 (Frameline Film Festival); July 23, 2016 (HBO)	

== Reception ==
=== Critical response ===
Looking received critical acclaim throughout its run, with praise directed at its nuanced portrayal of gay life and the performances of its cast. On the review aggregator Rotten Tomatoes, the first season holds a 90% approval rating based on 37 reviews, with an average rating of 7.6/10. The site's critical consensus reads: "Funny without being obnoxious, Looking provides authentic situations that feel universal with its subtle details and top-notch performances." On Metacritic, the first season has a weighted average score of 73 out of 100, based on 27 critics, indicating "generally favorable reviews".

The second season received similarly positive reviews, earning a 77/100 score on Metacritic and an 88% approval rating on Rotten Tomatoes.

Early comparisons of the series by both critics and audiences likened it to Girls and Sex and the City due to its focus on urban friendships and relationships. However, critics later highlighted distinct tonal differences. Emily St. James of The A.V. Club noted that "the differences between the two series go beyond the surface". Series star Jonathan Groff acknowledged the comparisons but emphasized the show's unique tone, writing style, and visual approach: "To be in the same breath as those shows is exciting... but the tone and writing and the style of the show is very different. And people will notice that when they see it."

Keith Uhlich of the BBC described the show as "one of the most revolutionary depictions of gay life ever on TV – and that's because it makes it totally ordinary".

Looking: The Movie, which served as the series finale, was also well received by critics. Rotten Tomatoes summarized the consensus as: "Touching and profound, Looking: The Movie puts a bittersweet conclusion to the too-soon-gone HBO series with humor and hopeful tenderness, even if its structure is slightly wobbly." Sonia Saraiya of Variety described the film as "moving and beautiful", while Jon Frosch of The Hollywood Reporter called it "essential viewing".

In 2019, The Guardian ranked Looking among the "100 Greatest TV Shows of the 21st Century". In 2022, Esquire placed it at #21 in its list of "The Best HBO Series of All Time", stating, "The series never gained a massive audience, but its reverberations are still being felt."

For the 10-year anniversary GQ's Raymond Ang wrote a lengthy review in January 2024 featuring insights from creators and cast and about the show "getting the reappraisal it deserves".

=== Ratings ===
Looking premiered to modest viewership. According to Variety, the pilot episode drew 338,000 viewers, with total viewership rising to 606,000 when encore broadcasts were included. Despite the initial low numbers, the series experienced growth over the season. The sixth episode achieved a then-series high with 519,000 viewers, marking a 50% increase compared to the premiere. As of February 23, 2014, the series averaged approximately two million viewers weekly across all platforms.

=== Accolades ===
Year	Award	Category	Nominee(s)	Result	Ref.
2014	Attitude Awards	TV Show of the Year	Looking	Won	
2014	Critics' Choice Television Awards	Best Guest Performer in a Comedy Series	Lauren Weedman	Nominated	
2014	EWwy Awards	Best Actor in a Comedy Series	Jonathan Groff	Nominated	
2014	Imagen Awards	Best Actor	Raúl Castillo	Nominated	
2014	Imagen Awards	Best Supporting Actor	Frankie J. Alvarez	Nominated	
2014	Gold Derby TV Awards	Best Comedy Actor	Jonathan Groff	Nominated	
2014	NALIP Awards	Breakthrough Performance	Raúl Castillo	Won	
2014	NewNowNext Awards	Best New Television Actor	Jonathan Groff	Won	
2014	NewNowNext Awards	Best New Television Series	Looking	Won	
2014	OUT100	TV Show of the Year	Looking	Won	
2015	Artios Awards	Outstanding Achievement in Casting for a Television Pilot Comedy	Carmen Cuba; Nina Henninger; Bernard Telsey; Wittney Horton; Abbie Brady-Dalton	Nominated	
2015	Dorian Awards	LGBTQ TV Show of the Year	Looking	Nominated	
2015	Dorian Awards	TV Director of the Year	Andrew Haigh	Nominated	
2015	Dorian Awards	Unsung TV Show of the Year	Looking	Nominated	
2015	EWwy Awards	Best Supporting Actress in a Comedy Series	Lauren Weedman	Nominated	
2015	GLAAD Media Awards	Outstanding Comedy Series	Looking	Nominated	
2015	Gold Derby TV Awards	Best Comedy Actor	Jonathan Groff	Nominated	
2015	Imagen Awards	Best Primetime Television Program – Drama	Looking	Nominated	
2015	Imagen Awards	Best Supporting Actor	Raúl Castillo	Nominated	
2015	NAMIC Vision Awards	Best Performance – Comedy	Frankie J. Alvarez	Nominated	
2015	NAMIC Vision Awards	Best Performance – Comedy	Raúl Castillo	Won	
2015	Screen Nation Film and Television Awards	Male Performance in TV	O-T Fagbenle	Nominated	
2016	Dorian Awards	LGBTQ TV Show of the Year	Looking	Nominated	
2016	Dorian Awards	Unsung TV Show of the Year	Looking	Won	
2016	Dorian Awards	Wilde Artist of the Year	Andrew Haigh	Nominated	
2016	GLAAD Media Awards	Outstanding Comedy Series	Looking	Nominated	
2017	GLAAD Media Awards	Outstanding Limited or Anthology Series	Looking: The Movie	Nominated	

== Broadcast ==
Looking premiered internationally in coordination with its U.S. debut on HBO. In Canada, the series aired simultaneously on HBO Canada. In Australia, the series premiered on Showcase on January 20, 2014. In New Zealand, it debuted on SoHo on January 23, 2014. The United Kingdom and Ireland saw the series premiere on Sky Atlantic on January 27, 2014, where it opened to 67,000 viewers. The third episode recorded the highest ratings of the season in the region, drawing 129,000 viewers. The second season premiered on Sky Atlantic on February 5, 2015. In South Africa, Looking premiered on M-Net on May 6, 2014.
