= El Chicano (film) =

2018 American film by Ben Hernandez Bray

- Theatrical release poster
- Directed by: Ben Hernandez Bray
- Written by: Ben Hernandez Bray; Joe Carnahan
- Produced by: Joe Carnahan
- Starring: Raúl Castillo; Aimee Garcia; Jose Pablo Cantillo; David Castañeda; Marco Rodríguez; Sal Lopez; Marlene Forte; Kate del Castillo; George Lopez
- Cinematography: Juan Miguel Azpiroz
- Edited by: Jason Hellmann
- Music by: Mitch Lee
- Production companies: WarParty Films; WarChest Productions
- Distributed by: Briarcliff Entertainment
- Release dates: September 22, 2018 (LAFF); May 3, 2019 (United States)
- Running time: 107 minutes
- Country: United States
- Language: English
- Budget: $8 million
- Box office: $1.4 million

El Chicano is a 2018 American superhero film directed by Ben Hernandez Bray, who co-wrote the screenplay with Joe Carnahan. It stars Raúl Castillo, Aimee Garcia, and George Lopez. The film has been called the "first Latino superhero movie". It premiered in September 2018 at the Los Angeles Film Festival and was released in the United States on May 3, 2019. Frank Grillo and Lorenzo di Bonaventura served as executive producers. The story follows Detective Diego Hernandez, who discovers that his twin brother’s death is tied to gang violence and a powerful drug cartel. As he digs deeper, he uncovers a hidden vigilante myth known as “El Chicano,” a masked figure seen as a protector of East L.A. Diego takes on the mantle to fight against a rising criminal threat and to reconcile with his brother’s past.

== Plot ==
Growing up in East Los Angeles, California twin brothers Diego and Pedro, along with their friend José, hear stories of a legend called El Chicano, a vigilante who defends the streets of LA by eliminating gangsters and other criminals. After dropping off José at his house, he receives a beating from his mother. El Chicano shows up later and kills José's father called "Shadow", a wheelchair-using shot caller for his gang. Afterwards, he sees Diego and Pedro and then rides off in the night.

Years later Diego is now an LAPD detective, Pedro is dead presumably by suicide, and José is now a gang leader who goes by his street name Shotgun. Diego, alongside his partner David investigates a crime scene where Shotgun's gang has been murdered except for one member, Silent. Diego and David pick him up for questioning, but he is executed during the drive, but not before Silent revealed to Diego that Pedro didn't commit a suicide, he was murdered by one of the members of the drug cartel. Diego goes to Shotgun for answers, but he evades the questions and taunts Diego, but Diego taunts him back by bringing up the abuse from his mother. Diego looks for answers from Pedro's old belongings and realizes Pedro was changing, wanting revolution, and justice for Los Angeles.

Diego goes to his only trusted confidant, Father Jesus, who mentions Pedro changed after being released from prison and how he got involved with Shotgun and another member Diego has yet to identify. Diego is further surprised when he finds a hidden storage unit Pedro rented and that he had begun to resurrect the mantle of El Chicano before his death. Diego and David later stake out a party held by Shotgun but are ambushed, resulting in Diego being injured and David dying. Ordered to recover by Captain Gomez, Diego has his mom and girlfriend leave for a while until everything is settled.

Frustrated and angry about the deaths of David and Pedro, alongside Shotgun's involvement, he visits Father Jesus' church once again where he takes Jesus' prized Tecpatl knife and finishes the El Chicano costume, ready to take revenge.

Diego, now operating as El Chicano, tracks down Shotgun at a club where he easily fights and kills Shotgun's bodyguards, and nearly wounds Jaws, the other gang member, who knew Pedro, while also being the son of an infamous cartel leader, El Gallo, who is interested in taking over LA. Shotgun escapes along with a wounded Jaws, where he strangles Jaws to death during the escape and pins the blame on El Chicano for his plans to move forward. El Gallo, Jaws' father, hears the news and swears vengeance on both El Chicano and the police.

A still injured Diego retreats home to tend to his wounds, but is suspected of involvement by Captain Gomez when Diego's wound on his leg begins to bleed. Diego learns later that Gomez and his officers have been kidnapped by El Gallo, who broadcasts his plans of execution on the internet, unless El Chicano comes to him. Diego goes after in saving the missing cops, kills the cartel members by working alongside the police officers he rescued, and finishes El Gallo as well. Finally having no more distractions, he now has the chance to go after Shotgun.

Diego chases him to a cemetery where the two fight with Shotgun, who wanted revenge for what happened to Shadow. Diego, having been more experienced in combat than Shotgun, easily and brutally bested him with series of punishing blows in a state of rage for everything Shotgun did to Diego's family for Pedro's death. After a brutal fight, Diego lands the killing blow to Shotgun through the knife in the chest, and then removes his mask in front of Shotgun reciting the words Pedro left behind, 'know thy enemy' before finishing him off, avenging Pedro's death.

Diego having sustained multiple injures and blood loss, passes out. He awakes later recovering from his injures, while having learned Gomez found him first, before the police arrived at the scene and saved him from being arrested, wanting to keep his best cop investigator from being identified as the vigilante. Back in Mexico, El Gallo's wife, La Hembra has now become the new leader of his crew and swears revenge on El Chicano. Back in LA, Diego now has accepted the El Chicano mantle and made peace with Pedro, seeing his spirit before, wanting to do him and his family proud by keeping it safe from the cartel invaders and all who come.

== Cast ==
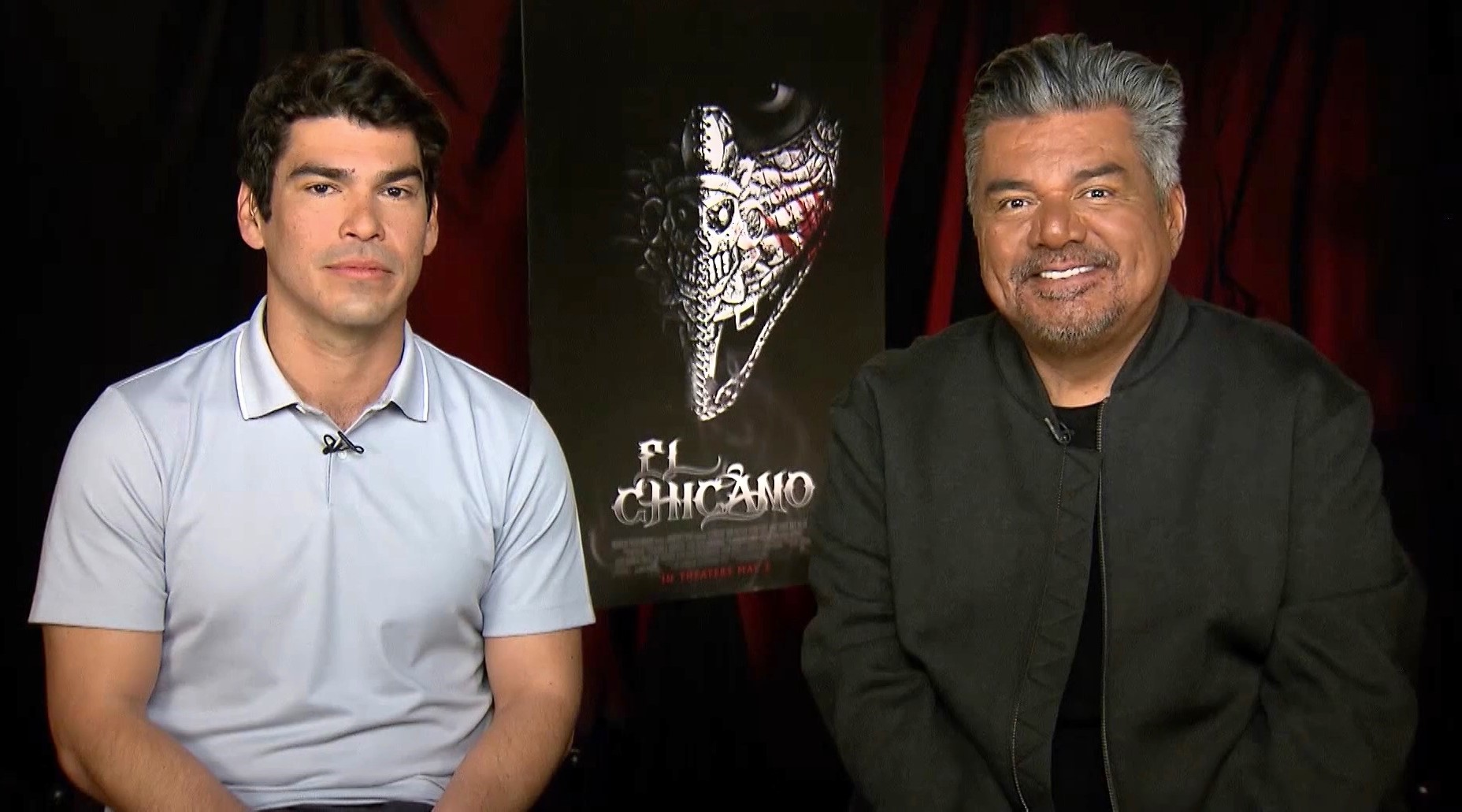
Raul Castillo and George Lopez talk about El Chicano in 2019

- Raúl Castillo as Diego Hernandez / El Chicano, a disciplined and haunted Los Angeles police detective. Diego struggles with the trauma of his rough upbringing and the mysterious death of his twin brother, Pedro. As he uncovers links between gang violence, cartels, and his own past, he reluctantly takes up the mantle of "El Chicano", a masked-vigilante rooted in East L.A. lore, to fight crime and avenge his brother's death. His journey is about justice, redemption, and confronting demons both personal and communal.
  - Castillo also portrays Pedro Hernandez, Diego's estranged and deceased twin brother.
- Aimee Garcia as Vanessa Velez, Diego’s supportive but emotionally conflicted girlfriend. Vanessa wants Diego to open up about his trauma and fears losing him to his obsession with the past. She serves as an emotional anchor and a reminder of the life Diego could have if he stepped away from violence.
- Jose Pablo Cantillo as Detective David Martinez, Diego’s loyal partner and longtime friend on the police force. Martinez balances humor and grounded perspective, acting as a stabilizing presence. As tensions escalate, he becomes increasingly concerned about Diego’s behavior and the dangers surrounding the investigation.
- David Castañeda as Shotgun / José, Diego and Pedro's former childhood friend, who is now a violent gang member and enforcer involved in cartel operations. Calculating and ruthless, Shotgun is tied to Pedro’s past and holds key information about criminal plans in East L.A. His presence intensifies the threat Diego faces.
- Marco Rodríguez as Jesus Salvas, a community elder with deep knowledge of local history and legends. Jesus provides insight into the myth of El Chicano and its cultural roots, helping Diego understand the symbolic weight of the vigilante identity.
- Sal Lopez as El Gallo, a hardened and influential cartel-linked gang leader. El Gallo is strategic and brutal, orchestrating operations that destabilize communities. His rise in power contributes to the violent escalation Diego is trying to stop.
- Marlene Forte as Susana, Diego and Pedro's mother, who represents family history, memory, and the pain of loss. She provides background that helps Diego confront truths he has long avoided.
- Kate del Castillo as La Hembra, a cartel boss with a commanding presence. La Hembra is cold, intelligent, and intimidating—operating at a level above street violence.
- George Lopez as Captain Gomez, Diego’s police captain. Stern, pragmatic, and experienced, Gomez tries to keep his officers focused while navigating political pressure and rising gang tensions. He notices Diego’s unraveling but is limited in how much he can intervene.
- Emilio Rivera as "Shadow", Shotgun's father, who was killed by the previous El-Chicano years ago.

== Production ==
The script began as Bray's memoir about the death of his brother, who had been involved with gangs, but Bray turned the memoir into a story about a fictional vigilante named "El Chicano". Carnahan and Bray then completed the script in a four-week collaborative writing session at Carnahan's home near Palm Springs. They pitched the script for El Chicano in 2017, but interested studios expressed concerns about the all-Latino cast, and ultimately passed on the film. The pair found new investors from the oil and gas industry who partnered with Carnahan and Frank Grillo's production company WarParty Films to produce El Chicano. The film was mostly shot in Calgary. Following the film's premiere at the LA Film Festival, Briarcliff Entertainment acquired U.S. distribution rights.

== Reception ==
=== Critical response ===
As of October 2021, the film holds an approval rating of 40% on review aggregator Rotten Tomatoes, based on 25 reviews by critics with an average rating of 4.6/10. The website's critic consensus reads: "El Chicano represents a step forward for representation in superhero cinema -- unfortunately, its clichéd story is nothing more than ordinary." On Metacritic, the film has a weighted average score of 46 out of 100, based on reviews by 13 critics, indicating "mixed or average" reviews.

The Hollywood Reporter praised the cast, including Castillo's "charismatic performance in the lead role" and the "vivid impressions" left by Marlene Forte and Aimee Garcia. The Los Angeles Times positively noted the more inclusive take on "Hollywood cop movies from the '80s, when masculinity came only in a macho shade", but also criticized the film's portrayal of Mexican nationals as "demonized, criminal, carnage-friendly, nationalist invaders". Writing for TheWrap, critic Monica Castillo similarly drew attention to the "fear-mongering cartel tropes" that failed to "undo the damage of hateful rhetoric aimed at Latin American people". In discussing the film's violence, the San Francisco Chronicle observed that "these blurry, hurried scenes are among the most frustrating elements in a largely disappointing movie", while The New York Times noted that its "political and thematic purpose" was unclear.

=== Accolades ===
- Best Feature Film, Maryland International Film Festival
