= Michael Lannan =

American screenwriter and producer

- Born: Michael William Lannan; September 9, 1977 (age 48); Brooklyn, New York
- Occupations: Screenwriter, producer
- Writing career
- Period: 2000s–present
- Notable work: Looking

Michael Lannan (born September 9, 1977) is an American screenwriter and producer. He is known as a creator and producer of the HBO series Looking. The series, about a group of gay friends in San Francisco inspired by Lannan's own life as a gay man, is based on Lorimer, a short film which Lannan produced and directed in 2011 and subsequently expanded into a feature film screenplay.

Lannan's other film and television credits include assistant producer and assistant director credits on episodes of Sons of Anarchy, Nurse Jackie, Rubicon and Damages and the film Remember Me, as well as acting and production credits on the docufiction film Interior. Leather Bar.
