= Jackie Burns (actress) =

American actress (born 1980)

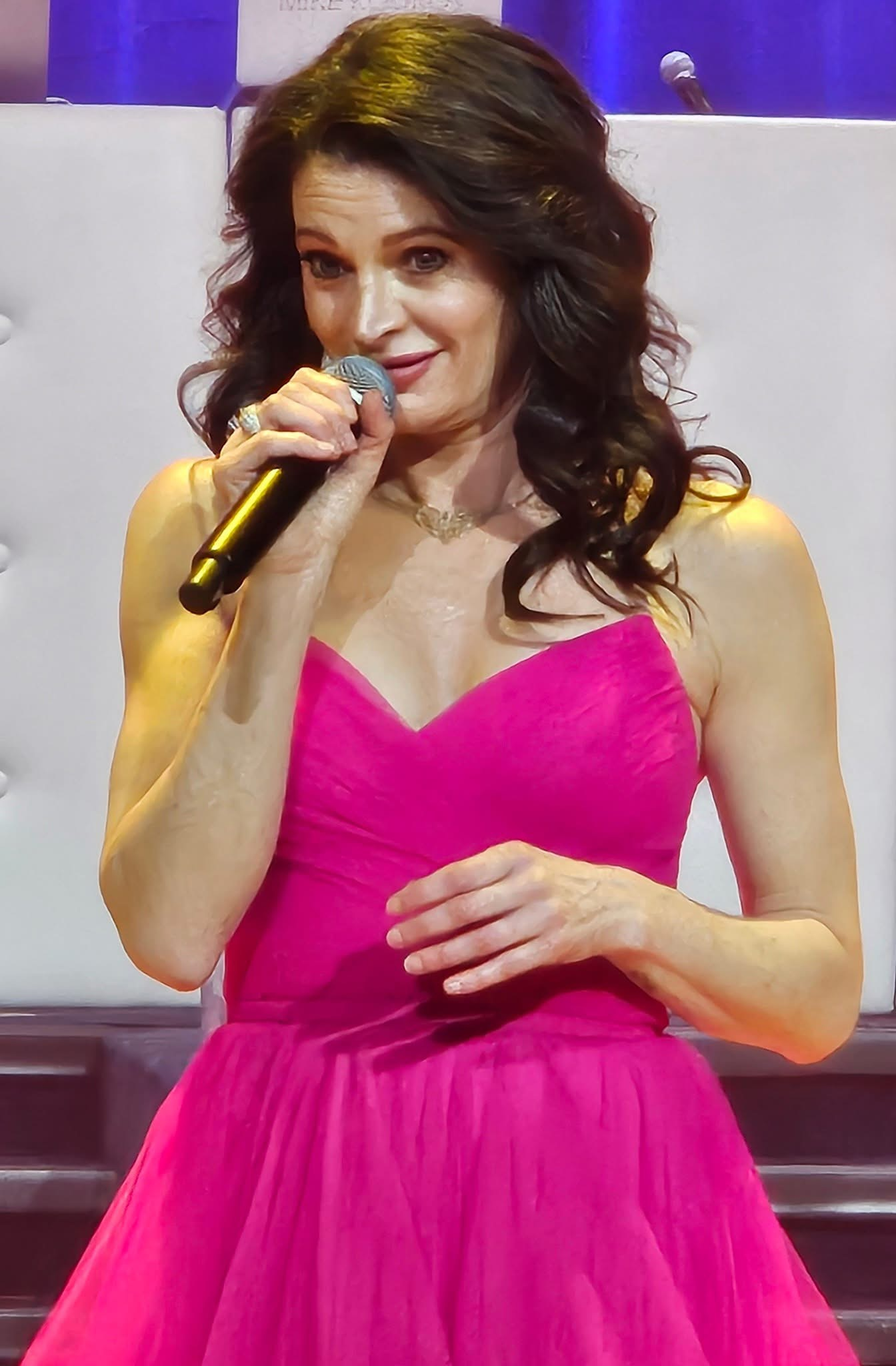
- Born: October 4, 1980 (age 46)
- Education: University of Connecticut (B.A.)
- Occupations: Actress, singer
- Years active: 2008–present

Jackie Burns (born October 4, 1980) is an American actress and singer best known for her work in musical theatre.

== Early life and education ==
Born on October 4, 1980, Burns grew up in Middletown, Connecticut, and Ivoryton, Connecticut, and in 2002, she graduated from the University of Connecticut with a degree in theatre.

== Career ==
Burns performed in regional theatre at Paper Mill Playhouse, Connecticut Repertory Theatre, and Northern Stage, among other places, for the first six years of her career.

She starred in the 2009 Tony Award-winning Broadway revival of Hair as part of the "Black Boys Trio." Burns also appeared in the original Off-Broadway cast of Rock of Ages.

From July 8, 2010, to June 5, 2011, Burns starred as Elphaba in the first national tour of Wicked, alongside Chandra Lee Schwartz and Amanda Jane Cooper as Glinda. Following her departure from the tour, Burns reprised the role of Elphaba in the Broadway production, replacing Teal Wicks on September 27, 2011. Burns was initially reunited with her former tour co-star Chandra Lee Schwartz as Glinda, and was later paired with Alli Mauzey. She has been praised for her performance as the not-so-Wicked Witch. Her last performance was scheduled to be on February 10, 2013, however she was unable to perform because of an illness. She was succeeded by Dutch theatre star Willemijn Verkaik.

Burns appeared in the Tom Kitt and Brian Yorkey musical If/Then as the standby for the lead role of Elizabeth (which was played by actress and singer Idina Menzel). The musical, directed by Michael Greif, had its world premiere at the National Theatre in Washington D.C., starting with previews on November 5, 2013, and an official opening on November 24, 2013, before transferring to Richard Rodgers Theatre on Broadway, which began previews on March 4, 2014, and opened on March 30, 2014. Burns's first performance as Elizabeth occurred on May 14, 2014, following intermission (due to Menzel feeling extremely sick during the show's first act). The next three days, Burns went on for the full show. If/Then closed on March 22, 2015.

On January 27, 2016, Burns joined the national tour of If/Then as the full-time Elizabeth replacing Menzel (who played the first 7 cities) in Dallas, Texas. She stayed with the production for the remainder of the run, closing on August 14, 2016.

On July 31, 2017, Burns returned to the role of Elphaba in the Broadway production of Wicked, four and a half years after she had last played the role. She performed opposite former tour co-star Amanda Jane Cooper as Glinda and played her final performance on July 14, 2018. She was succeeded by Jessica Vosk. Burns currently holds the distinction of being Broadway's longest-running Elphaba.

On October 31, 2018, Burns began performances as Elphaba in the second national tour of Wicked, starring opposite Kara Lindsay as Glinda. She performed in San Diego and Los Angeles before playing her final performance in the role to date in Salt Lake City on February 24, 2019. She was succeeded in the role by Mariand Torres, who had served as Burns' standby on the first national tour and during her second Broadway stint.

In March 2023, Burns had the leading role, that of bank robber Peggy Jo Tallas, in Houston's Alley Theatre production of "Cowboy Bob."

In 2024, Burns joined the cast of the world premiere of Burlesque, a musical based on the film of the same name. Burns was cast as Tess, the role played by Cher in the movie.

As of 2026, Burns is leading the national tour of Death Becomes Her as Madeline Ashton.

== Credits ==
=== Stage credits ===
==== Broadway ====
- If/Then – Elizabeth (Standby) (March 4, 2014 – March 22, 2015)
- Wicked – Elphaba (replacement) (September 27, 2011 – February 10, 2013, July 31, 2017 – July 14, 2018)
- Hair – Member of Black Boys Trio, Sheila (u/s), Jeanie (u/s), assistant dance captain (2009–2010, Broadway Revival)

==== Off-Broadway ====
- Rock of Ages – Swing, Regina (u/s), Justice (u/s) (2008–2009, Original Off-Broadway Production)
- Unlock'd (2013)
- Titanique - Celine Dion (2023)

==== Regional ====
- Dear Evan Hansen - Heidi Hansen (July 28, 2025 - August 3, 2025) - The Muny, St. Louis, MO
- Revolution(s) - Emma (October 4, 2025 - November 22, 2025) - Goodman Theatre, Chicago, IL
- Sweeney Todd - Mrs. Lovett (June/July 2026) - Hartford Stage and TheaterWorks Hartford, Hartford, CT

==== Tour ====
- Wicked – Elphaba (replacement) (July 8, 2010 – June 5, 2011, October 31, 2018 – February 24, 2019)
- If/Then – Elizabeth (replacement) (January 27, 2016 – August 14, 2016)
- Death Becomes Her — Madeline Ashton (original) (September 12, 2026 — present)

==== Other ====
- A Killer Party: A Murder Mystery Musical, An online musical presented as a webseries - Joan McArther (original)

=== Television ===
- All My Children, 1 episode
- The Late Show with David Letterman, Tribe Member, 1 episode, 2009
- Show People with Paul Wontorek, Guest, 1 episode, 2012
- Hey Kid: Backstage at If/Then with James Snyder, Herself, 2 episodes, 2014

=== Film ===
- Set it Up (2018)
- The Magnificent Meyersons (2019)

=== Podcast appearances ===
Burns appeared on Episode 3 of comedian Rick Glassman's podcast, Take Your Shoes Off (2019).

In 2021, Burns appeared on Episode 14 of the Wicked superfan podcast Sentimental Men.

== Awards ==
- Connecticut Critics Circle Award for Best Actress (won)
- IRNE Award for Best Actress in a Musical for Wicked (nominated)
