= Kevin Cahoon =

American singer-songwriter

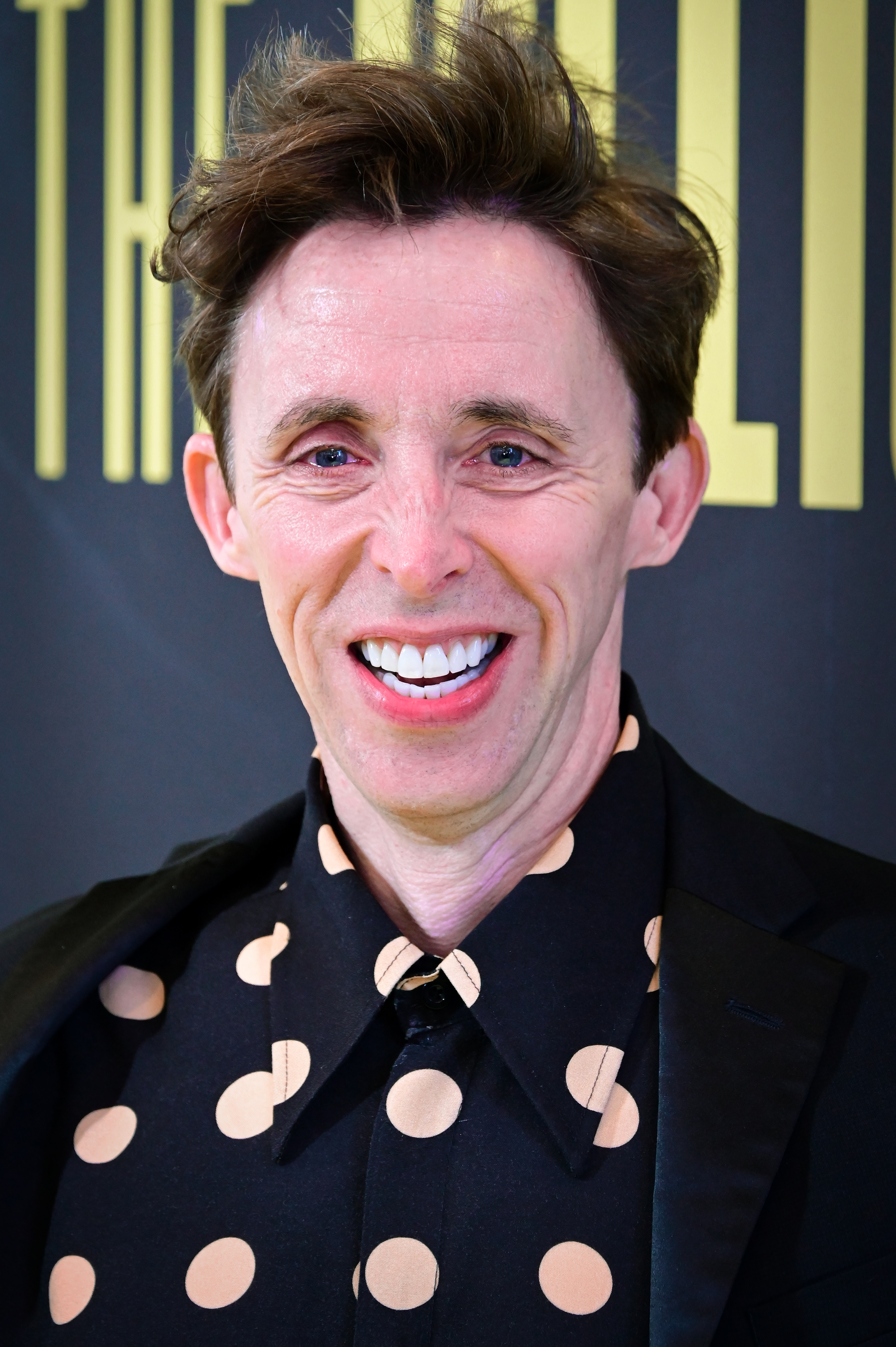
- Cahoon in 2026
- Born: July 21, 1971 (age 55); Houston, Texas, U.S.
- Education: New York University (BFA)
- Occupations: Actor; director; producer writer
- Years active: 1993–present

Kevin Cahoon (born July 21, 1971) is an American actor, director, writer, and singer-songwriter. In 2023, he was nominated for the Tony Award for Best Featured Actor in a Musical and the Drama Desk Award for Best Featured Performance in a Musical for his performance in Shucked on Broadway.

== Early life ==
Kevin Cahoon was born on July 21, 1971, in Houston, Texas. Cahoon began his performing career at the age of six as 'The World's Youngest Rodeo Clown', performing throughout the Texas and Oklahoma rodeo circuits, including many consecutive seasons at the Houston Livestock Show and Rodeo and the Texas State High School Finals Rodeo, resulting in a Letter of Citation from then Texas Governor Bill Clements.

At 10, Cahoon began his acting career in Houston, performing at local theaters including Theatre Under the Stars, Stages, The Main Street Theatre, and The Houston Grand Opera. Notable productions included the Anthony Newley/Leslie Bricusse musical Chaplin, Mame opposite Marilyn Maye, and the controversial production of Christopher Durang's Sister Mary Ignatius Explains It All For You at the then Tower Theatre.

Cahoon apprenticed with Theatre Under The Stars' Humphrey's School of Musical Theatre, appeared in numerous commercials, and performed at the opening ceremonies of Houston's Wortham Center for the Performing Arts.

He is featured in the book Theatre Under the Stars: Stars In Your Eyes.

At 13, Cahoon won the Teen Male Vocalist Grand Championship on television's Star Search, and went on to tour that summer in The Stars of Star Search.

He majored in acting at Houston's High School for the Performing and Visual Arts. He then went on to receive a BFA from New York University's Tisch School of the Arts at Circle in the Square.

== Career ==
=== Theatre ===
After graduation, Cahoon made his Broadway debut in The Who's Tommy. On Broadway he played Ed the Hyena in The Lion King directed by Julie Taymor, George in The Wedding Singer, The Childcatcher in Chitty Chitty Bang Bang, and was in the revival of The Rocky Horror Show.

He left his role in The Lion King to perform the eighth show of the week for John Cameron Mitchell in the title role of Hedwig in Hedwig and the Angry Inch at The Jane Street Theater Off-Broadway, eventually taking over the role and starring as 'Hedwig' in Boston, the Edinburgh Festival in Scotland, and an extended eight-month run at The Victoria Theatre in San Francisco. He was also featured in the documentary film Whether You Like It Or Not: The True Story of Hedwig. Cahoon joined creators John Cameron Mitchell and Stephen Trask on 'The Origin of Love Tour' at Town Hall in NYC.

Off-Broadway, Cahoon played Phil D'Armano in Andrew Lippa's The Wild Party at the Manhattan Theatre Club. He also starred opposite Matthew Broderick in the Roundabout Theatre Company's revival of The Foreigner for which he received a Lucille Lortel Award nomination for Outstanding Featured Actor. Other off-Broadway credits include The Shaggs: Philosophy of the World at Playwrights Horizons and the revival of Paula Vogel's How I Learned to Drive at Second Stage. For New York's City Center Encores! Series, he was seen as Woof in Hair and Peter in Babes in Arms.

Cahoon portrayed the role of Trinculo in Barry Edelstein's production of The Tempest with The LA Philharmonic at The Walt Disney Concert Hall. He has performed regionally at The Berkshire Theatre Festival, NY Stage and Film, The Guthrie Theatre, The Muny, The Bucks County Playhouse, and The Williamstown Theatre Festival. Other regional theater credits include Kathleen Marshall's production of Love's Labors Lost for which he received a San Diego Theatre Critics Circle Nomination for Best Featured Actor in a play and he portrayed the Sheriff of Nottingham in Ken Ludwig's Robin Hood!, both at The Old Globe. He originated the role of Hans Christian Andersen in the American premiere of Stephen Schwartz's My Fairytale for California's PCPA and appeared in The Imaginary Invalid at Bard Summerscape alongside Peter Dinklage, in Minsky's at L.A.'s Ahmanson Theatre, and in the all-male production of A Funny Thing Happened on the Way to the Forum directed by Jessica Stone. Cahoon originated the role of Jr.Jr. in Moonshine: That Hee Haw Musical at the Dallas Theater Center written by Robert Horn, Shane McAnally, and Brandy Clark.

Cahoon is featured in the Original Cast Recordings of Shucked, The Lion King, The Rocky Horror Show, The Wild Party, Babes In Arms, The Wedding Singer, and The Shaggs: Philosophy Of The World.

He also appeared on the 1998, 2000, 2006, and 2023 Tony Awards.

Cahoon most recently portrayed Melvyn Snyder in Tony Goldwyn and Savion Glover's production of Chez Joey at Arena Stage. Previously, the role of Peanut in Shucked on Broadway, which opened on April 4, 2023, at the Nederlander Theatre. In November and December 2024, Cahoon played Albin opposite Cheyenne Jackson in La Cage aux Folles at Pasadena Playhouse Directed by Sam Pinkleton.

Cahoon is a voting member of the Tony Award Nominating Committee.

He also received a Tony Nomination as a producer for 'Cats: The Jellicle Ball' currently running on Broadway.

=== Television and film ===
On television, Cahoon recently portrayed Gunther on FX's 'The Beauty' and Earl Clark on FOX's 'Monarch', beginning in September 2022. Other television credits include, Hugo on Season 2 and Season 3 of A Series of Unfortunate Events (Netflix), Rueben Lundgren on Nurse Jackie (Showtime), Jon-Jon on Modern Family (ABC), Ross Rothman on Six Degrees (ABC) and Kermit Jones on The Royale (AMC). He has also guest starred on Ryan Murphy's 'The Beauty', The Marvelous Mrs. Maisel (Amazon), Elementary (CBS), Odd Mom Out (BRAVO), Black Box (ABC), The Good Wife (CBS), The Mentalist (CBS), CSI (CBS), Franklin and Bash (TNT), NCIS (CBS), Canterbury's Law (FOX), Hope and Faith (ABC), Ed (NBC), Law and Order (NBC) and Law and Order: Criminal Intent (NBC). On film he can be seen in So Cold the River, I Am Michael, Disney's Mars Needs Moms, Woody Allen's The Curse of the Jade Scorpion, Paul Reiser's The Thing About My Folks, Adrienne Shelly's Sudden Manhattan, Michael Knowle's One Night, and W.E. directed by Madonna. He also was featured in the Woody Allen short, Sounds From A Town I Love, which was created for VH-1's "The Concert for NYC" after September 11, 2001. He portrayed Bobby Barnes on Season 3 of Glow on Netflix. He is member of The Television Academy.

=== Directing ===
Cahoon directed the critically acclaimed virtual and live productions of Terrence McNally's 'It's Only A Play', as well as Larry Shue's The Nerd both for The George Street Playhouse. He directed the 2017 New York Theatre Workshop Gala starring Jesse Tyler Ferguson, Rachel Dratch, Ben Platt, Patti LuPone, and Christine Ebersole, among others. He returned to direct NYTW's 2018 gala starring Zachary Quinto and Celia Keenan-Bolger, the 2020 gala starring Ana Gastayer and Taylor Mac, its virtual 2021 gala starring Annaleigh Ashford, Bridgett Everett, and Michael Urie, as well as its 2022 gala honoring Jim Nicola. Cahoon directed the developmental productions Toe Pick: The Complete Ice Capades of Nancy Kerrigan and Tonya Harding starring Zackary Grady and John Early, Grifftopia starring and created by Griffin Newman and the debut productions of Tastiskank, created by Kate Reinders and Sarah Litzsinger, which went on to win the Aspen Comedy Festival, all for the Ars Nova Theatre in NYC. He directed six consecutive productions for the Bay Area Houston Ballet and Theatre. For his work at BAHBT, he received the Jete Society Honor in 2011.

=== Music ===
With his New York-based band Kevin Cahoon and Ghetto Cowboy, Cahoon has played shows at New York venues including CBGB's, Don Hill's, Ars Nova, Joe's Pub, and Irving Plaza. He has shared the bill with Tom Waits, Elvis Costello, and Justin Bond. He is also featured in the documentary film Squeezebox about NYC's downtown music scene. Cahoon and Ghetto Cowboy's debut album, Doll, received The Out Music Award for Outstanding Debut Recording, received a Citation of Merit from Billboard Magazine's World Songwriters Awards, received the Pabst Blue Ribbon Live & Local Award for New York City, and the feature film Ready? OK! used the title song for its lead track. Cahoon and Ghetto Cowboy are presenters on Sirius Radio's OutQ, charting in the top 10, and on LOGO's NewNowNext. He is a member of the Recording Academy.

Kevin has been profiled by The New York Times, 'Variety', 'The Washington Post', Paper Magazine, and TimeOut NY, and is featured in Amy Arbus's photography collection 'The Fourth Wall', Julie Taymor's 'The Lion King: Pride Rock On Broadway' as well as Michael Reidel's 'Singular Sensation - The Triumph of Broadway'.

== Filmography ==
=== Film ===
- 1993: Fly by Night - Long Island Teen #3
- 2005 The Thing About My Folks - Perky Waiter
- 2011: Mars Needs Moms - Wingnut (voice)
- 2022: So Cold the River - Dylan

=== Television ===
- 2015: Modern Family - John-John Episode: "Fight or Flight"
- 2018-2019: A Series of Unfortunate Events - Hugo
- 2019: Glow - Bobby Barnes
- 2022: Monarch - Earl Clark

=== Video games ===
- 2006: Bully - Thad
- 2018: Red Dead Redemption 2 - Clay Davies
- 2019: Red Dead Online - Clay Davies

== Stage ==
Theatre credits
Year	Title	Role	Venue	Refs.
1993	The Who's Tommy	Local Lad, Security Guard, Ensemble (replacement)	St. James Theatre, Broadway	
1996	Babes in Arms	Gus Fielding	Guthrie Theater, Minneapolis	
1997	The Lion King	Ed	New Amsterdam Theatre, Broadway	
1999	Babes in Arms	Peter	New York City Center	
1999	The Wild Party	Phil D'Armano	New York City Center	
1999	Hedwig and the Angry Inch	Hedwig	Jane Street Theater, Off-Broadway	
2000	The Rocky Horror Show	Phantom	Circle in the Square Theater, Broadway	
2001	Hair	Woof	New York City Center	
2001	Hedwig and the Angry Inch	Hedwig	Pleasance Theatre, Edinburgh	
2002	Hedwig and the Angry Inch	Hedwig	Victoria Theater, San Francisco	
2005	The Foreigner	Ellard	Laura Pels Theater, Off-Broadway	
2005	Chitty Chitty Bang Bang	The Childcatcher	Hilton Theater, Broadway	
2006	The Wedding Singer	George	5th Avenue Theater, Seattle	
2006	The Wedding Singer	George	Al Hirschfeld Theater, Broadway	
2008	Bonnie & Clyde: A Folktale	performer	New York Musical Theatre Festival	
2009	Minsky's	Buster	Ahmanson Theatre, Los Angeles	
2010	A Funny Thing Happened on the Way to the Forum	Erronius, Tintinabula	Williamstown Theatre Festival, Massachusetts	
2010	Our Town	Joe Stoddard	Williamstown Theatre Festival, Massachusetts	
2011	The Shaggs: Philosophy of the World	Charley, Bobby	Playwrights Horizons, Off-Broadway	
2011	My Fairytale	Hans Christian Andersen	PCPA Theaterfest, California	
2012	How I Learned To Drive	Chorus	Second Stage Theater, Off-Broadway	
2013	Spamalot	Historian	The MUNY, St. Louis	
2013	The Rocky Horror Show	Frank 'n' Furter	Bucks County Playhouse, Pennsylvania	
2014	The Rocky Horror Show	Frank 'n' Furter	Bucks County Playhouse, Pennsylvania	
2015	Moonshine: That Hee Haw Musical	Junior Junior	Dallas Theater Center	
2016	The Wizard of Oz	Hunk, The Scarecrow	The MUNY, St. Louis	
2016	Love's Labor's Lost	Boyet	Old Globe Theatre, San Diego	
2016	The Rocky Horror Show	Frank 'n' Furter	Bucks County Playhouse, Pennsylvania	
2017	Robin Hood!	Sheriff of Nottingham	Old Globe Theatre, San Diego	
2018	Toe Pick	performer	Dixon Place, New York	
2019	Guys and Dolls	Harry the Horse	The MUNY, St. Louis	
2019	The Rocky Horror Show	Frank 'n' Furter	Bucks County Playhouse, Pennsylvania	
2022	Shucked	Peanut	Pioneer Theatre Company, Salt Lake City	
2023	Shucked	Peanut	Nederlander Theater, Broadway	
2024	La Cage aux Folles	Albin	Pasadena Playhouse, Los Angeles	
2025	Urinetown	Old Man Strong / Hot Blades Harry	New York City Center, Encores!	
2026	Chez Joey	Melvin Snyder	Arena Stage, Washington DC	

== Awards and nominations ==
Year	Award	Category	Work	Result	Ref.
2005	Lucille Lortel Award	Outstanding Featured Actor in a Play	The Foreigner	Nominated	
2023	Tony Award	Best Featured Actor in a Musical	Shucked	Nominated	
2023	Drama Desk Award	Outstanding Featured Performance in a Musical	Shucked	Nominated	
