= Christmas in Connecticut (musical) =

Musical based on the 1945 film of the same name

- Music: Jason Howland
- Lyrics: Amanda Yesnowitz
- Book: Patrick Pacheco Erik Forrest Jackson
- Basis: Christmas in Connecticut (1945)
- Premiere: 18 November 2022
- Productions: 2022 Goodspeed Opera House 2023 Pioneer Theatre Company

Christmas in Connecticut is a musical based on the Warner Bros. 1945 film of the same name that starred Barbara Stanwyck, Dennis Morgan and Sydney Greenstreet. The book is by Patrick Pacheco and Erik Forrest Jackson, with lyrics by Amanda Yesnowitz, and music by Jason Howland.

The musical is set in 1942 in New York City, where columnist Elizabeth Sanders takes a job under the pseudonym Liz Lane, writing about married life in the country, a subject she knows nothing about. When her publisher invites a war hero and fan to her fictional farm, she is forced to maintain her charade while hosting the Christmas holiday.

== Background and production history ==
The musical was originally commissioned by Broadway Licensing and Peter Schneider Productions with Warner Bros. Theatre Ventures. Goodspeed Musicals became involved in early 2021, when Artistic Director Donna Lynn Hilton "took a call from Broadway Licensing and learned that they were involved with an adaptation of the lighthearted Barbara Stanwyck film. Hilton believed that it would have been a 'personal failure' if the new show did not premiere at Goodspeed."

Of adapting the film, book writers Erik Forrest Jackson and Patrick Pacheco said "we embraced Liz as a force of nature ahead of her time—imagine Sex and the City's boundary-pushing Carrie Bradshaw pretending to be a lifestyle traditionalist Martha Stewart. We discovered along the way many contemporary resonances, including the persistence of that unbreakable glass ceiling, the ongoing tensions between clashing points of view, and the perils of invented personas [...] We've also added two new characters—a hunky socialist farmhand and a fact-checker who yearns to be a gumshoe—to give Liz even more challenges as she navigates her rural trial by fire."

Lyricist Amanda Yesnowitz commented, "Liz Lane—immortalized by the saucy Barbara Stanwyck on film—hungers to use her words to make some serious feminist waves during a time when that was unthinkable. The idea to center on such a progressive female protagonist back in the 1940s (and also in the 21st century!) is not de rigueur in Hollywood or on Broadway. And that right there is why I am so drawn to this story. Narratives which allow, nay empower, women to push sociocultural boundaries in beautifully subversive ways are in woefully short supply. Regarding the score of the show, we've tried to imbue both the music and lyrics with flavors of the delicious big band era as well as contemporary resonances to remind audiences, ever so subtly, that Christmas in Connecticut is not only a musical of its time, but of our time, too."

=== Goodspeed (2022) ===
The musical premiered at the Goodspeed Opera House in East Haddam, Connecticut, running from 18 November to 30 December 2022. Donna Lynn Hilton, Goodspeed's Artistic Director, wrote "Christmas in Connecticut gives us the opportunity to do what Goodspeed does best—develop and produce a new musical comedy packed with smart writing and fantastic music that will thrill our audiences. The fact that it’s a holiday classic set in our home state makes it irresistible."

The production was directed by Amy Corcoran, with choreography by Marjorie Failoni, and orchestrations by Kim Scharnberg. Of conceiving the musical for a modern audience, director Corcoran said "unfortunately we're finding out that a lot of the problems that Liz faced in the movie and in our story are still relevant today for many, many women who work in fields that are maybe dominated by men."

=== Salt Lake City (2023) ===
A revised version of the musical began performances on 1 December 2023, at the Pioneer Memorial Theatre in Salt Lake City, Utah, and closed on 16 December 2023. Salt Lake Magazine noted that "the show’s creators continue to develop and fine-tune the work, making the PTC mounting an all-new experience for audiences." The production was directed by Shelley Butler, with choreography by Karen Azenberg. In addition to playing the contentious love interests, the stars of this production—Alyse Alan Louis and Eric William Morris—are married.

== Original cast and characters ==
Character	Goodspeed (2022)	Pioneer Theatre Company (2023)
Liz Sandor	Audrey Cardwell	Alyse Alan Louis
Jefferson Jones	Josh Breckenridge	Christian Magby
Alexander Yardley	Ed Dixon	Gerry McIntyre
Dudley Beecham	Raymond J. Lee	RJ Vaillancourt
Victor Beecham	Matt Bogart	Eric William Morris
Felix Bassenak	James Judy	David Girolmo
Norah O'Connor	Tina Stafford	Linda Mugleston
Gladys Higgenbottom	Rashidra Scott	Tiffany Denise Hobbs
Mario De Luca	Matthew Curiano	Jamen Nanthakumar

== Musical numbers ==
=== Goodspeed Musicals songlist ===
Act I

- "Tomorrow's Woman/No!" - Liz, Ensemble
- "No! (Reprise)" - Liz, Dudley
- "The World of Liz Lane" - Dudley, Jefferson, Ensemble
- "Recipe for Success" - Liz
- "A Capital Idea" - Yardley, Gladys, Dudley, Liz
- "Christmas in Connecticut" - Company
- "Home for the Holidays" - Victor, Dudley, Norah, Liz
- "American Dream" - Jefferson
- "The World of Liz Lane (Reprise") - Liz
- "Catch the Ornament" - Felix, Liz, Dudley, Yardley, Victor, Jefferson
- "Something's Fishy" - Gladys
- "Christmas in Connecticut (Reprise)" - Norah, Liz, Dudley, Felix, Jefferson, Victor

Act II

- "The Most Famous Jefferson" - Yardley, Liz, Gladys, Dudley, Jefferson, Ensemble
- "Morning Chores" - Victor, Liz
- "Morning Chores (Reprise)/Before I Met Her" - Liz, Victor
- "I'm Not Eleanor" - Liz
- "Tomorrow's Woman (Reprise)" - Liz
- "May You Inherit" - Company

=== Pioneer Theater Company songlist ===
Act I

- "That's How You Know" - Ensemble
- "Tomorrow's Woman" - Liz, Victor, Ensemble
- "Tomorrow's Woman (Reprise)" - Liz, Victor
- "The World of Liz Lane" - Readers, Dudley, Jefferson, Liz, Soldiers
- "Please the Boss" - Gladys
- "A Capital Idea" - Yardley, Gladys, Liz, Dudley
- "The Twelve Days of Christmas" - Noah
- "On 28th Street" - Victor
- "The American Dream" - Jefferson
- "The World of Liz Lane (Reprise)" - Liz
- "Catch the Ornament" - Felix, Liz, Dudley, Yardley, Victor, Jefferson

Act II

- "Christmas in Connecticut" - Liz, Victor, Dudley, Jefferson, Yardley, Gladys, Felix, Norah
- "You Did It" - Liz, Victor
- "You Did It (Part 2)" - Liz, Victor
- "Something's Fishy" - Gladys, Mario
- "Chemistry" - Liz, Victor, Jefferson, Gladys, Dudley, Mario, Felix, Norah
- "Please the Boss (Reprise)" - Gladys, Mario
- "May You Inherit" - Company

== Critical response ==
Of the Goodspeed production, Christopher Arnott of Hartford Courant commended Christmas in Connecticut as a delightful experience that, while not without flaws, effectively addresses the struggles of women in the workplace during the mid-20th century. Nancy Sasso Janis, reviewing for Patch Media, wrote that the "diverse cast [does] well with the material, a mix of holiday themes with blackmail and fraud. This plot seemed to be quite different from the one in the film, at least in many details. [...] Despite the changes made to the story, it remains very frothy. Other than a few bad words, this would be a good show for families, although the old-fashioned tone would probably appeal to those old enough to remember the source material."

Of the Pioneer Theater Company production, BroadwayWorld's Tyler Hinton said the musical was "worthy of becoming a perennial holiday favorite, perfectly delivering feel-good nostalgia in a beautifully wrapped contemporary package. [...] The book is structured well with elements of traditional Christmas musicals, romantic comedies, and even mystery thrillers, all without being derivative. The characters are well drawn and easy to root for, and although the outcome may be obvious, that doesn't take away from the pleasure in arriving there." For Front Row Reviewers, Kari Vest England wrote, "Lyricist Amanda Yesnowitz’s lyrics combined with composer Jason Howland’s melodies create effortless musical storytelling. The clever original lyrics pack a potent punch as they drive the plot forward. [...] Christmas in Connecticut is a family friendly whimsical winter exercise in honesty. Each character navigates what it means to be fully expressed, achieve dreams, and realize love while living authentically."
