= Miki Abraham =

American actor and singer

- Born: Mckynleigh Alden Abraham; 1991 or 1992 (age 34–35)
- Education: Northern Kentucky University
- Occupations: Actor, singer
- Years active: 2011–present
- Spouses: Alex Joseph Grayson (m. 2023–2025)

Mckynleigh 'Miki' Abraham is an American actor and singer. They are known for their roles in various musical theatre productions, notably for their role of Lulu in the first US national tour of Shucked. They are also known for their appearance as a contestant on The Glee Project.

== Early life ==
Abraham was born Paducah, Kentucky. They started performing on stage at seven years old and won various talent competitions, including first place in the adult division of the Kentucky Opry Talent contest. Abraham was homeschooled in high-school.

In 2011, at the age of 19, Abraham gained national attention as a contestant on the first season of The Glee Project, a reality television competition series on Oxygen for which the prize was a seven episode arc on Glee. They were eliminated fourth during the competition. After their elimination, they went on to study performing arts at Northern Kentucky University, from which they graduated in 2015 with a Bachelors of Fine Arts in acting.

== Career ==
In 2015, Abraham joined the ensemble of a US National Tour of Beautiful: The Carole King Musical.

In 2019, Abraham joined a US national touring revival of Once On This Island as a member of the ensemble and an understudy.

In 2021, Abraham performed in a regional production of Little Shop of Horrors at the Ozark Actors Theatre, for which they were nominated for a Best Supporting Performer in a Musical award at the BroadwayWorld St. Louis Awards.

In 2022, Abraham auditioned for a role in Shucked during the show's pre-Broadway tryouts in Salt Lake City, after which the show transferred to Broadway. Abraham was cast as the understudy of former The Glee Project contender Alex Newell, in the role of Lulu. The show opened on April 4, 2023, at the Nederlander Theatre, marking Abraham's Broadway debut.

While performing on Broadway, Abraham performed in a various concert and cabaret performances.

In 2024, Abraham appeared in the Off-Broadway production of A Sign of the Times. The production ran at the New World Stages from the 7th of February until the 2nd of June. In the same year, Abraham took on the role of Lulu full-time for the US National tour of Shucked, for which their performance received positive media coverage. The tour opened on October 20, 2024, in Richmond, Virginia and closed in Los Angeles, California on September 7, 2025. Abraham continued in the role for the second year of the show's touring.

== Personal life ==
Abraham met fellow actor Alex Joseph Grayson in September 2019 when both were performing on the US tour of Once On This Island. They were engaged on October 15, 2020, and married in New York City in April 2023.

Abraham is nonbinary.

== Filmography ==
Television roles
Year	Title	Role	Notes
2021	The Glee Project	Contestant (Themself)	Season 1

== Theatre ==
Stage roles
Year	Title	Role	Notes
2015	Beautiful: The Carole King Musical	Ensemble	US National Tour
2019	Once On This Island	Ensemble performer, understudy	Revival US National Tour
2021	Little Shop of Horrors	Crystal	Regional production at the Ozark Actors Theatre
2023	Shucked	Lulu (understudy for Alex Newell), Swing Performer	Broadway
2024	A Sign of the Times	Ensemble	Performed on Off-Broadway theatre, New World Stages from the 7th of February until the 2nd of June.
2024	Shucked	Lulu	First US National Tour

Concert roles
Year	Title	Role	Notes
2023	54 Sings Beyoncé	Themself	At 54 Below. Performed on June 20, 2023.
2023	A Thousand Times Enough	Themself	At The Green Room 42. Performed on September 18, 2023. Abraham's cabaret showcase debut. Abraham was the creator/producer of this show.
2023	An All-Star Holiday Celebration	Themself	At The Green Room 42 for the Broadway Sessions. Performed on December 7, 2023.
2023	The Disco Odyssey	Themself. Background vocals	At 54 Below. Performed on December 11, 2023.
2024	Somewhere That's Blue	Themself	At 54 Below. Performed on January 28, 2024. Abraham's solo debut at the venue.
2024	A Broadway Valentine's Day	Themself	At 54 Below. Performed on February 14, 2024.
2024	A Thousand Times Enough	Themself	At The Green Room 42. Performed on March 28, 2024. Abraham was also the creator/producer of this show.
2024	54 Sings Hair	Themself	At The 54 Below. Performed on May 30, 2024.
2024	A Sign of the Times cast at the Broadway Sessions	Ensemble	At The Green Room 42. Performed on April 11, 2024.
