= Shucked =

2022 musical comedy

- Broadway Promotional Poster
- Music: Brandy Clark; Shane McAnally
- Lyrics: Brandy Clark; Shane McAnally
- Book: Robert Horn
- Premiere: October 28, 2022: Pioneer Memorial Theatre, Salt Lake City
- Productions: 2022 Salt Lake City; 2023 Broadway; 2024 North American Tour; 2025 London; 2026 Australia

Shucked is a 2022 musical with music and lyrics by Brandy Clark and Shane McAnally, and a book by Robert Horn. The Broadway production began previews at the Nederlander Theatre on March 8, 2023, before opening on April 4. The show played its final performance on January 14, 2024. It received positive reviews and went on to receive nine nominations at the 76th Tony Awards, including Best Musical. Cast member Alex Newell became one of the first two openly non-binary performers to be nominated for and win a Tony Award, with their win for Best Featured Actor in a Musical.

A feature film adaptation is currently planned.

== Synopsis ==
=== Act One ===
The storytellers discuss the history of the town, Cob County, emphasizing the town's love for corn. They introduce the audience to Maizy and Beau, a couple who are planning their wedding ("Corn").

While Beau's brother, Peanut, is officiating the wedding, the town's corn suddenly begins to die. The town decides that they can't have a wedding until they fix the corn. Maizy talks to her cousin, Lulu, and her grandfather, before discussing the situation with Beau. Maizy tells Beau that she wants to leave the town in order to find solutions, but Beau is against the idea. Maizy explains her reasoning, before booking a plane to Tampa ("Walls"). Maizy is amazed by Tampa, and she finds a podiatrist who calls himself a "corn doctor". Unaware of what that actually means, she decides to meet the doctor, a man named Gordy ("Travelin' Song").

Gordy comes from a family of conmen, but is not great at the job ("Bad"); currently, he is in debt to some members of the mob (played by the storytellers). Gordy notices a bracelet that Maizy is wearing, which he takes to have appraised by the jewelers (also played by the storytellers), who say that the stones are incredibly valuable. Gordy realizes he can use the bracelet to get out of his debt. He tries to charm Maizy, and Maizy kisses him. Although shocked by her eagerness to cheat on Beau, she delights in her ability to save the corn ("Woman of the World").

Maizy takes Gordy back to Cob County, where Beau is angered at her decision to go to Tampa. Maizy retorts that Beau is jealous that she managed to do something about their situation, whereas Beau couldn't even leave the county. As the fight gets increasingly heated, Maizy admits that she kissed Gordy. Beau is shocked and angered, and breaks off his engagement with Maizy, deciding that he's going to find someone who wants him ("Somebody Will").

At Lulu's whiskey distillery, Maizy vents about the situation. Lulu tells her that her mistake was telling Beau that she kissed Gordy. Gordy arrives and tries to sweet-talk Lulu, but Lulu ignores him, relishing her independence as a single person ("Independently Owned").

Gordy receives two calls from the jewelers and the mob. The jewelers tell him the stones weren't as valuable as they thought, while the members of the mob tell Gordy his debt has been cleared due to the mobster being killed by "Murry the Mohel". However, Gordy misunderstands both calls, due to the poor cell service in Cob County. Peanut, Beau, and Lulu overhear the conversations, and go to warn Maizy ("Holy Shit"). However, Maizy remains optimistic and doesn't believe the other three. She and Lulu get into an argument, leading to Maizy saying that Lulu's whiskey is bitter. After they leave, Maizy wonders what love means ("Maybe Love").

Gordy reveals a healthy ear of corn to the town. He tells them that the stones from the bracelet are stopping the corn from growing, and to fix the situation he will remove the stones from the county; he actually intends to keep the stones for himself. The rest of the town takes this as an answer, except for Beau, Lulu, and Peanut. Maizy, still frustrated with Beau and Lulu, and excited by her ability to save the corn, misinterprets Gordy being down on one knee, and agrees to marry him, to the surprise of everyone in Cob County ("Corn (Reprise)").

=== Act Two ===
The storytellers briefly recap the events of Act I. The town goes into a song about how they're Christian, but they drink alcohol ("We Love Jesus") (in the North American tour version, the town goes into a song about the purple rocks ("Ballad of the Rocks")). Peanut and Beau watch the celebration, and Peanut asks Beau if he's doing all right. Beau says he's fine, but admits his heartache after Peanut leaves ("OK").

As Gordy tries to leave Cob County with the stones, he runs into Lulu. Gordy attempts to charm Lulu, again, and Lulu is interested in Gordy's advances. However, she removes the catalytic converter from his car, forcing him to stay in town.

Maizy and Gordy both have trouble with the vows for their upcoming wedding. Maizy realizes that the chemistry between her and Beau is still there, and she begins to have second thoughts about the wedding. Lulu and Beau advise Gordy and Maizy, respectively, to pretend that they are the ones they are giving vows to, while the storytellers watch with chagrin ("I Do").

Maizy asks her grandfather for advice about the wedding. Afterwards she speaks with Lulu, and the two make up ("Friends"). Lulu admits that she is interested in Gordy, and the two of them try to come up with a plan to set things right. Meanwhile, Peanut, while attempting to overlook his own romantic interest in Gordy, suggests that Beau, along with the rest of the men, get Gordy drunk, which would force him to admit everything. Storyteller 2 joins in on this song ("Best Man Wins").

The evening before the wedding, the boys easily manage to get Gordy drunk ("Corn Mix"), and he admits his plan. He also admits that the corn ear he showed the town was planted, as he bought it from Whole Foods. However, Gordy says that he wants to do right. Beau and Maizy get back together, and Gordy and Lulu also get together. It is revealed that Storyteller One is Lulu and Gordy's grandchild, while Storyteller Two is Maizy and Beau's grandchild. Beau and Maizy have the wedding that they were hoping for, as Peanut, once again, officiates ("Maybe Love (Reprise)").

== Musical numbers ==
Act I

- Overture – Orchestra
- "Corn" – Storytellers, Ensemble
- "Walls" – Maizy
- "Travelin' Song" – Maizy, Storytellers, Ensemble
- "Bad" – Gordy, Storytellers, Female Ensemble
- "Woman of the World" – Maizy, Ensemble
- "Somebody Will" – Beau, Ensemble
- "Independently Owned" – Lulu
- "Holy Shit" – Peanut, Beau, Lulu
- "Maybe Love" – Maizy
- "Corn" (reprise) – Ensemble

Act II

- Entr'acte – Orchestra
- "We Love Jesus" – Ensemble (Replaced by "Ballad of the Rocks" – Ensemble for the North American tour)
- "OK" – Beau
- "I Do" – Maizy, Beau, Lulu, Gordy
- "Friends" – Maizy, Lulu
- "Best Man Wins" – Peanut, Beau, Male Ensemble
- "Corn Mix" – Ensemble
- "Maybe Love" (reprise) – Maizy, Ensemble

== Cast and characters ==
Character	Salt Lake City	Broadway	First National Tour	London
Character	2022	2023	2024	2025
Maizy	Caroline Innerbichler	Caroline Innerbichler	Danielle Wade	Sophie McShera
Lulu	Alex Newell	Alex Newell	Miki Abraham	Georgina Onuorah
Gordy	John Behlmann	John Behlmann	Quinn VanAntwerp	Matthew Seadon-Young
Peanut	Kevin Cahoon	Kevin Cahoon	Mike Nappi	Keith Ramsay
Beau	Andrew Durand	Andrew Durand	Jake Odmark	Ben Joyce
Storyteller 1	Ashley D. Kelley	Ashley D. Kelley	Maya Lagerstam	Monique Ashe-Palmer
Storyteller 2	Taylor Trensch	Grey Henson	Tyler Joseph Ellis	Steven Webb

=== Notable cast replacements ===
==== Broadway (2023–2024) ====
- Maizy: Isabelle McCalla

== Productions ==
=== Washington, D.C. (2020) (cancelled) ===
Shucked was partially derived from one of Horn's earlier projects, 2015's Moonshine: That Hee Haw Musical. Sources seem to differ on whether Shucked should be considered an evolution of or completely separate from Moonshine, as the only elements remaining from the 2015 show are two songs and that one character is named Lulu. Originally the show was booked for a run in late 2020 at the National Theatre. This run was subsequently cancelled due to the COVID-19 pandemic. During the pandemic the show continued to undergo rewrites.

=== Salt Lake City (2022) ===
The show was first performed in 2022 at the Pioneer Memorial Theatre in Salt Lake City, Utah from October 28 to November 12, where it received positive reviews. Most of the Utah cast transferred with the show to Broadway.

=== Broadway (2023–2024) ===
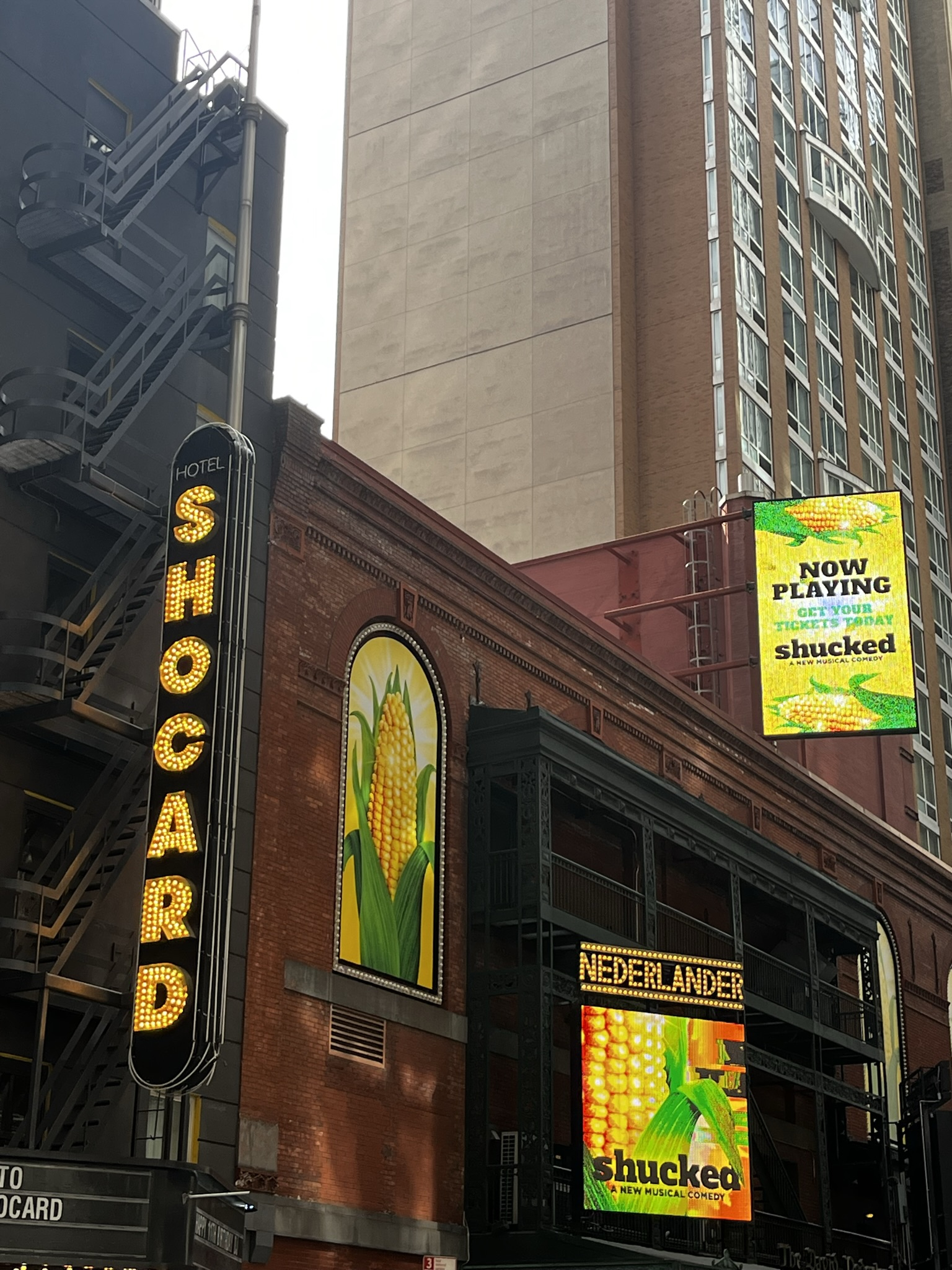
Shucked marquee on the Nederlander Theatre

The Broadway production began previews on March 8, 2023, at the Nederlander Theatre. Two weeks prior, the song "Maybe Love" was released as part of rehearsal footage. Advertising for the production was vague and used corn-related puns in order to generate interest, a strategy which seems to have been successful. In its first week of previews, the show grossed US$291,972, having sold 99% of its available tickets at reduced "preview pricing" rates. Its second and third weeks of previews grossed $456,719 and $517,296, respectively.

The production was directed by Jack O'Brien. It featured choreography by Sarah O'Gleby, orchestrations by Jason Howland, set design by Scott Pask, costume design by Tilly Grimes, lighting design by Japhy Weideman, sound design by John Shivers, and wig design by Mia Neal.

The production opened on April 4, 2023, to mostly positive reviews. Later that year, the show launched a marketing campaign with country singer Reba McEntire as its spokesperson.

The show played its final performance on January 14, 2024, after 28 previews and 327 performances.

=== North American Tour (2024) ===
In October 2023, it was announced that the show would embark on a 30-city National Tour across North America. Casting was announced on September 16, 2024. The tour began performances at the Providence Performing Arts Center on October 20, 2024.

=== London (2025) ===
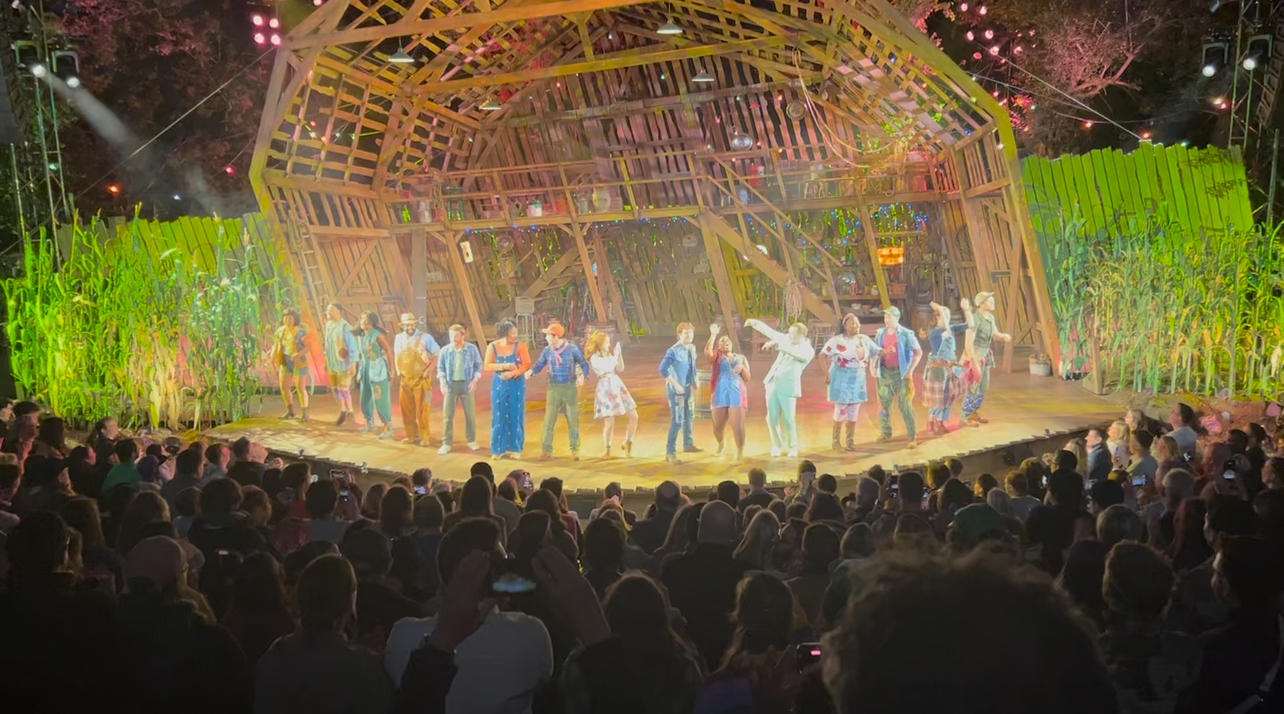
Shucked finale at Regent's Park Open Air Theatre

The show began preview performances for its European premiere at London's Regent's Park Open Air Theatre on May 10, 2025, which lasted until May 20, where the show officially opened at its press night performance to positive reviews from critics, and closed on June 14, 2025. Jack O'Brien returned to direct the production. Casting includes Monique Ashe-Palmer as Storyteller 1, Ben Joyce as Beau, Sophie McShera as Maizy, Georgina Onuorah as Lulu, Keith Ramsay as Peanut, Matthew Seadon-Young as Gordy, and Steven Webb as Storyteller 2.

=== Australia (2026) ===
In January 2024, it was announced that an Australian production of the show was planned for Spring 2026.

=== 2nd North American Tour (2027) ===
In August 2026, it was announced a non-equity 2nd National tour would begin in January, 2027.

== Cast album ==
On March 20, 2023, it was announced that the show would present an Original Broadway Cast Recording, to be released by Sony Masterworks Broadway on May 5. The album was produced by Jason Howland, Billy Jay Stein, McAnally, and Clark.

== Reception ==
The show received positive reviews from The Daily Beast, Deadline, Entertainment Weekly, the New York Post, New York Stage Review, Theatrely, Time Out, Times Square Chronicles, and Variety. It received mixed to negative reviews from The Guardian, The New York Times, Observer, and The Wrap. Reviews tended to praise the show's comedy and acting. Its music was generally noted as good but not stand-out, with the exception of the number "Independently Owned", which many reviewers called attention to for Alex Newell's exceptional performance. Weak spots in the show seemed to be its plot and its implementation of a moral.

== Awards and nominations ==
=== 2022 Salt Lake City production ===
Year	Award	Category	Nominee	Result
2022	BroadwayWorld Salt Lake City Awards	Best New Play or Musical		Won

=== 2023 Broadway production ===
Year	Award	Category	Nominee	Result
2023	Tony Awards	Best Musical		Nominated
2023	Tony Awards	Best Book of a Musical	Robert Horn	Nominated
2023	Tony Awards	Best Original Score	Brandy Clark and Shane McAnally	Nominated
2023	Tony Awards	Best Direction of a Musical	Jack O’Brien	Nominated
2023	Tony Awards	Best Featured Actor in a Musical	Kevin Cahoon	Nominated
2023	Tony Awards	Best Featured Actor in a Musical	Alex Newell	Won
2023	Tony Awards	Best Scenic Design of a Musical	Scott Pask	Nominated
2023	Tony Awards	Best Sound Design of a Musical	John Shivers	Nominated
2023	Tony Awards	Best Orchestrations	Jason Howland	Nominated
2023	Drama Desk Awards	Outstanding Musical		Nominated
2023	Drama Desk Awards	Outstanding Book of a Musical	Robert Horn	Nominated
2023	Drama Desk Awards	Outstanding Music	Brandy Clark and Shane McAnally	Won
2023	Drama Desk Awards	Outstanding Lyrics	Brandy Clark and Shane McAnally	Nominated
2023	Drama Desk Awards	Outstanding Direction of a Musical	Jack O'Brien	Nominated
2023	Drama Desk Awards	Outstanding Lead Performance in a Musical	Andrew Durand	Nominated
2023	Drama Desk Awards	Outstanding Featured Performance in a Musical	Kevin Cahoon	Nominated
2023	Drama Desk Awards	Outstanding Featured Performance in a Musical	Alex Newell	Won
2023	Drama Desk Awards	Outstanding Scenic Design of a Musical	Scott Pask	Nominated
2023	Drama Desk Awards	Outstanding Costume Design of a Musical	Tilly Grimes	Nominated
2023	Drama Desk Awards	Outstanding Sound Design of a Musical	John Shivers	Nominated
2023	Drama Desk Awards	Outstanding Orchestrations	Jason Howland	Nominated
2023	Drama League Awards	Distinguished Performance	Alex Newell	Nominated
2023	Drama League Awards	Outstanding Production of a Musical		Nominated
2023	Drama League Awards	Outstanding Direction of a Musical	Jack O'Brien	Nominated
2023	Outer Critics Circle Awards	Outstanding New Broadway Musical		Nominated
2023	Outer Critics Circle Awards	Outstanding Book of a Musical	Robert Horn	Won
2023	Outer Critics Circle Awards	Outstanding New Score	Brandy Clark and Shane McAnally	Nominated
2023	Outer Critics Circle Awards	Outstanding Director of a Musical	Jack O'Brien	Nominated
2023	Outer Critics Circle Awards	Outstanding Lead Performer in a Broadway Musical	Caroline Innerbichler	Nominated
2023	Outer Critics Circle Awards	Outstanding Featured Performer in a Broadway Musical	Alex Newell	Won
2023	Outer Critics Circle Awards	Outstanding Orchestrations	Jason Howland	Nominated
2023	Theatre World Award		Caroline Innerbichler	Honoree
2023	Theatre World Award		Ashley D. Kelley	Honoree
2023	Dorian Awards	Outstanding Broadway Musical		Nominated
2024	Grammy Award	Best Musical Theater Album	John Behlmann, Andrew Durand, Caroline Innerbichler, Alex Newell (principal vocalists); Brandy Clark, Jason Howland, Shane McAnally & Billy Jay Stein (producers); Brandy Clark & Shane McAnally (composers/lyricists)	Nominated

== Film adaptation ==
On January 14, 2024, during the curtain call at the end of the show's final performance on Broadway, Mike Bosner, the show's lead producer, announced that Mandalay Pictures will adapt the musical into a feature film. Robert Horn will return to pen the screenplay, with Jason Michael Berman, Alan Fox and Jordan Moldo producing. Horn, Brandy Clark, Shane McAnally and Jack O’Brien will executive produce along with Sandra Berman and David Zelon.
