= Newsies (musical) =

American musical by Alan Menken, Jack Feldman, and Harvey Fierstein

- The Musical
- Original Broadway artwork
- Music: Alan Menken
- Lyrics: Jack Feldman
- Book: Harvey Fierstein
- Basis: Newsies by Bob Tzudiker; Noni White
- Premiere: September 25, 2011: Paper Mill Playhouse
- Productions: 2011 Paper Mill Playhouse; 2012 Broadway; 2014 North American tour 2017 Film; 2022 London
- Awards: Tony Award for Best Original Score

Newsies: The Musical is a musical with music by Alan Menken, lyrics by Jack Feldman, and a book by Harvey Fierstein. The show is based on the 1992 musical film of the same name, which in turn was inspired by the real-life Newsboys Strike of 1899 in New York City, with Fierstein's script adapted from the film's screenplay by Bob Tzudiker and Noni White.

The musical premiered at the Paper Mill Playhouse in 2011 and made its Broadway debut in 2012, where it played for more than 1,000 performances before touring.

== Productions ==
=== Paper Mill Playhouse (2011) ===
Newsies The Musical premiered at the Paper Mill Playhouse in Millburn, New Jersey, from September 25, 2011, through October 16. The production was directed by Jeff Calhoun with choreography by Christopher Gattelli. This production was later transferred to Broadway with several changes in the music and actors.

=== Broadway (2012–14) ===
The musical opened on Broadway at the Nederlander Theatre for limited engagement. It started in previews on March 15, 2012, and officially started on March 29, 2012. On May 16, 2012, Disney announced that Newsies was an open-ended engagement. The engagement was extended through August 19, 2012, after the first previews.

The original cast of the Broadway production featured Jeremy Jordan as Jack Kelly and John Dossett as newspaper tycoon Joseph Pulitzer. The cast also included Kara Lindsay as Katherine Plumber, Capathia Jenkins as Medda Larkin, Ben Fankhauser as Davey, Andrew Keenan-Bolger as Crutchie, and Lewis Grosso and Matthew Schechter sharing the role of Les. Also featured in the cast were Mike Faist as Morris Delancey and Jordan’s understudy and Kevin Carolan as Roosevelt. The Broadway production cost about $5 million to stage. Newsies recouped its initial investment of $5M in seven months, becoming the fastest of any Disney musical on Broadway to turn a profit.

Producers announced on August 14, 2012, due to his commitments with NBC's Smash, leading man Jordan would exit the musical on September 4. It was also confirmed that newcomer Corey Cott (who became his alternate earlier in the month due to Jordan's production requirements for Smash) would be his replacement beginning September 5.

The musical played its final public performance on August 23, 2014, and privately closed with an invite-only audience on August 24, 2014, having played 1,004 performances.

=== National tour (2014–16) ===
The musical began a North American tour on October 11, 2014, commencing in Schenectady, New York. During the 2014–2015 and 2015–2016 seasons, the tour was expected to play 25 cities, over 43 weeks. It concluded its run on October 2, 2016, in Austin, Texas after 784 performances in 65 cities across the US and Canada.

=== Film (2017) ===
On February 16, 2017, a film version of the National tour was released. It was filmed at the Pantages Theatre in Hollywood, California between September 9 to 11, 2016, with some shots being filmed without an audience. It was directed by Jeff Calhoun and Brett Sullivan, with a story by Harvey Fierstein. The original Broadway leads joined the existing tour cast recorded to make the film, and it was released onto Disney+.

=== London (2022) ===
On February 21, 2022, it was announced that the musical was scheduled to open that year in London. On March 8, 2022, it was announced that a brand new immersive in the round production directed and choreographed by Matt Cole was to open at the Troubadour Wembley Park Theatre in November 2022 with an official opening on 8 December. The original London cast includes Michael Ahomka-Lindsay as Jack Kelly, Bronté Barbé as Katherine Plumber, Moya Angela as Medda Larkin, Samuel Bailey as Specs, Josh Barnett as Race, Cameron Blakely as Joseph Pulitzer, Jack Bromage as Tommy Boy, Alex Christian as Buttons, Arcangelo Ciulla as Ike, George Crawford as Morris Delancey, Ross Dawes as Snyder, Joshua Denyer as Mush, Ross Dorrington as Splasher, Matthew Duckett as Crutchie, Jacob Fisher as Albert, Jamie Golding as Wiesel, Damon Gould as Finch, Alex James-Hatton as Oscar Delancey, Barry Keenan as Nunzio, Ryan Kopel as Davey, Sion Lloyd as Bunsen, George Michaelides as Romeo, Mukeni Nel as Jo Jo, Joshua Nkemdilim as Elmer, Mark Samaras as Mike, and Matt Trevorrow as Henry. The production closed on 30 July 2023. However, the show is teased to return to the UK as at the final performance as Tristan Baker, producer of Newsies, said “That’s it for Wembley, we’ll see you next year!”. The show’s website also said, “Bye for now, but not forever… NEWS COMING SOON” until the end of 2025. It has since become a WordPress error page.

== Synopsis ==
=== Act I ===
In July 1899, a group of orphaned and homeless newsboys live in a Lower Manhattan lodging house with their informal leader, seventeen-year-old Jack Kelly. In the early hours of the morning, Jack tells his best friend, Crutchie, of his dream to one day leave New York for a better life out West ("Santa Fe (Prologue)"). As the sun rises, the rest of the newsies awaken and prepare for a day on the job, finding as much joy as they can in their life of poverty ("Carrying the Banner"). At the circulation gate, Jack meets a new newsboy named Davey and his nine-year-old brother Les. Unlike the other newsies, the brothers have a home and a loving family, and have been pulled out of school only temporarily to support their parents while their father is out of work with an injury. Seeing young Les as an opportunity to sell more papers as a guilt trip, Jack offers to be their partner. Meanwhile, the publisher of the New York World, Joseph Pulitzer, expresses his displeasure at his newspaper's declining circulation. To increase his profits, he decides to increase the cost of the papers for the newsies (the newsies first have to buy papers to then go and sell them), ignoring his secretary's concerns that "it's going to be awfully rough on those children" ("The Bottom Line").

Later, Jack, Davey, and Les are selling their final newspapers of the day when the corrupt Warden Snyder of the Refuge, a juvenile detention center, recognizes Jack as an escapee from his institution. He attempts to chase the boys down, but they find cover in a vaudeville-style theatre owned by Jack's friend Medda Larkin, whom he regularly paints backdrops for. As Medda performs ("That's Rich"), Jack spots a young female reporter named Katherine Plumber. She rebuffs Jack's attempts to flirt with her, but she is then charmed when he leaves her with a sketch of her portrait ("Don’t Come A-Knocking/I Never Planned on You").

The next morning, the newsies discover that the cost of newspapers has been raised to sixty cents per hundred. Outraged, Jack declares the newsies to be a union and organizes a protest ("The World Will Know"). Katherine decides to cover the strike, seeing it as an opportunity to be taken more seriously as a journalist ("Watch What Happens"). The next day, the boys have informed the rest of the city's newsies about the strike, but each neighborhood claims that they will only join once Spot Conlon, leader of the Brooklyn newsies, gives the okay. The newsies are discouraged by the lack of support, but Davey convinces them to protest regardless of who shows. Scabs arrive to take the newsies' jobs, but are persuaded to join the strike by Jack, who delivers an impassioned speech condemning child labor and the city's treatment of the poor ("Seize the Day"). The protest appears to be headed for success, but is soon cut short when Pulitzer's goon squad and the police arrive to break it up by force. During the ensuing fight, Crutchie is apprehended, badly beaten, and taken to the Refuge. A devastated Jack escapes to the lodging house rooftop and, blaming himself for the protest's failure, fantasizes about running away forever ("Santa Fe").

=== Act II ===
The next morning, Katherine finds the battered and bruised newsies in Jacobi's Deli, only to learn that no one knows where Jack is as rumors circulate about his whereabouts. She cheers the other newsies up by showing them that her article about the strike made the front page of the New York Sun. Thrilled, the boys rejoice at making the headline and imagine what it would be like to be famous ("King of New York"). However, Pulitzer has declared a blackout on strike news, meaning Katherine's story will be the only one to run. Meanwhile, Crutchie writes a letter to Jack, describing the filthy and abusive conditions at the Refuge. He asks Jack to make sure the newsies continue to look out for one another, signing the letter, "your brother, Crutchie" ("Letter from the Refuge"). Later, Davey finds Jack hiding out in the basement of Medda's theatre and informs him of his plan to hold a citywide rally in the theatre. Jack, distraught over Crutchie's arrest, refuses to put the other boys back in danger, but Davey, along with Katherine and Les, convinces him that their fight is too important to quit ("Watch What Happens (Reprise)").

Back at the World, an angry Pulitzer plots with Warden Snyder about how to stop Jack. Snyder reveals that Jack was originally sentenced to the Refuge for vagrancy, but has since become a "frequent visitor," with his most recent arrest being for trafficking stolen food and clothing. Jack soon arrives with an invitation for Pulitzer to attend the rally Davey has planned. Pulitzer declines, assuring Jack that no newspaper will violate the blackout order by covering the rally. Pulitzer claims that if it's not in the papers, it never happened. Jack attempts to counter by claiming the newsies already have a reporter on their side, but Pulitzer reveals that Katherine is his daughter and that "Plumber" is only her pen name. He offers Jack a choice: if the strike is called off, Jack will be cleared of all charges and given enough money to leave for Santa Fe, but if not, he and the other newsies will all be arrested and sent to the Refuge ("The Bottom Line (Reprise)"). Katherine, who has been listening in secret, attempts to apologize to Jack, but he brushes her off as he is detained by Pulitzer's goons and led into the cellar.

The next morning, Spot Conlon and the Brooklyn newsies declare their support of the strike and head to the rally ("Brooklyn's Here"). Jack, believing there is no way the newsies can win against Pulitzer's money, power, and connections, shows up to the rally to reluctantly suggest the strike be called off. He accepts the Santa Fe money from one of Pulitzer's men as Davey, Spot, and the other newsies watch in disbelief, calling him a traitor and a scab. Jack flees to his rooftop, only to find that Katherine has beaten him there. She has discovered Jack's drawings of the abuse he suffered at the Refuge among his belongings and realizes that he stole to feed and clothe the other boys. They argue about their respective betrayals and the fate of the strike, but the argument is cut short when she impulsively kisses him. Katherine has a new idea: use Jack's drawings and one of her articles to print their own newspaper, calling for every worker under 21 to strike alongside the newsies. Jack agrees, recalling an abandoned printing press in Pulitzer's cellar, but before getting to work, they share a romantic moment, each stating that the other has given them "something to believe in" ("Something to Believe In").

The other newsies join Jack and Katherine in printing their own paper, the Newsies Banner, and distribute copies throughout the city ("Once and for All"). A copy reaches Governor Theodore Roosevelt, who arrives in full support of the newsies' cause. Roosevelt gives Pulitzer an ultimatum, forcing the latter to concede to Jack's demands. Jack proposes that Pulitzer buy back every paper the newsies fail to sell each day. Initially reluctant, Pulitzer agrees when Jack points out he will still ultimately benefit from the increased sales. Jack and Roosevelt inform the newsies that the strike is over and they have won. As the newsies celebrate, Roosevelt informs them that he has shut down the Refuge, citing Jack's drawings as his motivation to do so. Crutchie returns to his friends, and Snyder is arrested. Impressed at the influence Jack's drawings had on the governor, Pulitzer offers him a job as a daily political cartoonist. Jack declines, claiming it is time he leaves for Santa Fe, but Davey, Katherine, and Crutchie remind him that "New York's got us, and we're your family." Ultimately, Jack decides to stay and chooses to remain a newsboy as well as accept the cartoonist job ("Finale").

== Original casts ==
Character	Workshop	Paper Mill Playhouse	Broadway	North American Tour	Filmed production	London
Character	2010	2011	2012	2014	2016	2022
Jack Kelly	Jay Armstrong Johnson	Jeremy Jordan	Jeremy Jordan	Dan DeLuca	Jeremy Jordan	Michael Ahomka-Lindsay
Joseph Pulitzer	Shuler Hensley	John Dossett	John Dossett	Steve Blanchard	Steve Blanchard	Cameron Blakely
Katherine Plumber	Meghann Fahy	Kara Lindsay	Kara Lindsay	Stephanie Styles Morgan Keene	Kara Lindsay	Bronté Barbé
Davey Jacobs	Jason Michael Snow	Ben Fankhauser	Ben Fankhauser	Jacob Kemp	Ben Fankhauser	Ryan Kopel
Medda Larkin	Liz Larsen	Helen Anker	Capathia Jenkins	Angela Grovey	Aisha De Haas	Moya Angela
Crutchie	Andrew Keenan-Bolger	Andrew Keenan-Bolger	Andrew Keenan-Bolger	Zachary Sayle	Andrew Keenan-Bolger	Matthew Duckett
Les Jacobs	Matthew Gumley	R.J. Fattori Vincent Agnello	Lewis Grosso Matthew Schechter	Vincent Crocilla Anthony Rosenthal	Ethan Steiner	Nesim Adnan Haydn Court Oliver Gordon Ethan Sokontwe
Theodore Roosevelt	Tom Alan Robbins	Kevin Carolan	Kevin Carolan	Kevin Carolan	Kevin Carolan	Barry Keenan

=== Notable Broadway replacements ===
- Jack Kelly: Corey Cott (September 5, 2012 – August 24, 2014)
- Joseph Pulitzer: Ron Raines (October 9 – December 16, 2012)
- Katherine Plumber: Liana Hunt (February 3 – August 24, 2014)
- Les Jacobs: Joshua Colley (March 11, 2013 – February 2, 2014)
- Theodore Roosevelt: Tom Alan Robbins (September 18 – November 4, 2012 & April 29, 2013 – August 24, 2014)

== Background ==
=== Historical accuracy ===
Jack Kelly is the amalgamation of several historical leaders in the Newsboys’ Strike of 1899, primarily Kid Blink (who is featured in the film but omitted from the musical), who was known as a charismatic speaker and a leader to the younger boys. Other real strikers included in the show are Racetrack Higgins, Mush Meyers, and Spot Conlon. Although Katherine Plumber is a fictional character, she is named for Pulitzer's daughter Katherine Ethel, who died of pneumonia in 1884 at the age of 2. Many newsgirls participated in the strike as well, a fact largely ignored by both the film and the original productions of the musical. However, recent productions include more female newsie roles written in, as well as many characters who have been written as gender-neutral in the script currently available for licensing. In the London production, the role of Spot Conlon and the Brooklyn newsies are all-female.

In the musical, the newspapers raise prices during July 1899 after pressures to sell more papers after the war. However, the price for the papers was raised from 50 cents to 60 cents, not after, but during the Spanish American War. The cause of the strike was that they did not lower the high price after the war was over. This caused the newsies to revolt because they felt that it was more difficult to sell papers without the exciting news of the war, plus the additional pressures of the price changes. At the height of the strike, on July 24, 1899, the Newsboys Union held a massive rally at the New Irving Theatre, a vaudeville venue on the Bowery (reimagined in the musical as Medda Larkin's theatre). The rally was covered in extensive detail by The New York Sun (employer of the fictional Katherine Plumber), and featured speeches from the union's leaders. It is rumored that for a period of time during the strike that Kid Blink secretly began working with Pulitzer and Hearst, which resulted in a massive riot of strikers versus scabbers, similar to Jack's near-betrayal after Pulitzer promises him a full ride to Santa Fe. Unlike in the film, the musical follows the historical ending of the strike, where the World and the Journal agreed to buy back all unsold papers. Historically, the price was kept at 60 cents per 100, but in the musical they strike a deal for 55 cents per 100 papers.

=== Differences from the 1992 film ===
In addition to the songs from the original movie, Newsies The Musical contains several new numbers such as "Watch What Happens", "Brooklyn's Here" and "Something to Believe In". The film's two Medda Larkin songs ("My Lovey Dovey Baby" and "High Times Hard Times") were replaced by the single number "That's Rich", while the remaining songs were rewritten to fit plot changes between the film and the stage musical. Davey and Les's parents are mentioned only in passing, omitting a film scene where Jack has dinner in their tenement apartment; the lyrics to "Santa Fe" are changed to compensate for this change. The film characters of Sarah Jacobs (Davey and Les's sister and Jack's original love interest) and the New York Sun reporter Bryan Denton are replaced by the composite character Katherine Plumber, a reporter with whom Jack falls in love. Also omitted was the solo for "Patrick's Mother." Spot Conlon does not appear until the rally, omitting the film's scenes with Spot, Jack, and Davey, as well as Spot's involvement in the fight between the newsies and scabbers.

The song "Letter from the Refuge", a solo number for Crutchie, was added for national tour, replacing a film scene where Jack visits Crutchie after he is captured by Snyder. "Letter from the Refuge" now appears in the current version of the show licensed for performance, and was also included in the Broadway proshot.

== Musical numbers ==
Act I

- "Overture" – Orchestra
- "Santa Fe (Prologue)" – Jack and Crutchie
- "Carrying the Banner" – Race, Albert, Specs, Henry, Finch, Jack, Crutchie, Newsies, Nuns
- "Carrying the Banner" (reprise I) – Newsies †
- "The Bottom Line" – Pulitzer, Seitz, Bunsen, Hannah
- "Carrying the Banner" (reprise II) – Newsies †
- "That's Rich" – Medda
- "I Never Planned on You/Don't Come A-Knocking" – Jack, Bowery Beauties
- "The World Will Know" – Jack, Davey, Crutchie, Les, Newsies
- "The World Will Know" (reprise) – Newsies †
- "Watch What Happens" – Katherine
- "Seize the Day" – Davey, Jack, Newsies
- "Santa Fe" – Jack

Act II

- "Entr'acte – Orchestra †
- "King of New York" – Race, Katherine, Davey, Les and Newsies
- "Letter from The Refuge" – Crutchie ‡†
- "Watch What Happens" (reprise) – Davey, Jack, Katherine and Les
- "The Bottom Line" (reprise) – Pulitzer, Seitz, Bunsen ^
- "Brooklyn's Here" – Spot Conlon, Newsies
- "Something to Believe In" – Jack and Katherine
- "Seize the Day" (reprise I) – Newsies †
- "Once and for All" – Jack, Davey, Katherine, Race, and Newsies
- "Seize the Day" (reprise II) – Newsies †
- "The World Will Know" (reprise) – Newsies †
- "Finale" – Jack, Company

Notes:

† Not included on the Original Broadway Cast Recording

‡ Added for the national tour

^ Mayor sings Bunsen's line in the Broadway Cast Recording but Bunsen sings it in the revised edition which was filmed and is available for licensing

== Reception ==
The Paper Mill production drew critical acclaim. According to The New York Times:

Newsies will open in time to qualify for the Tony Award in a season when the Tony for best musical is seen as up for grabs; Newsies is already considered a likely contender for a nomination even before the show opens ...

In his review of the Broadway production, Ben Brantley of The New York Times wrote:

As choreographed by Christopher Gattelli, they keep coming at us in full-speed-ahead phalanxes, fortified by every step in a Broadway-by-the-numbers dance book. ... Mr. Jordan ... is a natural star who has no trouble holding the stage, even without pirouettes. ... Mr. Feldman’s lyrics are spot-on, while the melody reminds us just how charming a composer Mr. Menken ... can be.

== Recordings ==
Newsies (Original Broadway Cast Recording)

Soundtrack album by Various artists
- Released: April 10, 2012
- Length: 50:42
- Label: Ghostlight Records

The original Broadway cast recording was released by Ghostlight Records on iTunes on April 10, 2012, and the CD was released on May 15. Six songs were added for the stage adaptation, including three newly written for the Broadway production since the Paper Mill Playhouse debut: "The Bottom Line", "That's Rich", and "Something to Believe In" (replacing "Then I See You Again", also written for the stage adaptation).

The recording also features three bonus tracks:

Bonus tracks
No.	Title	Performed by	Length
18.	"Santa Fe - Bonus Track"	Jeremy Jordan, Alan Menken	2:03
19.	"Seize The Day (Full Song with Dance Break)"	Jeremy Jordan, Ben Fankhauser, Lewis Grosso, Matthew Schechter, Newsies Company	6:40
20.	"King of New York (Full Song with Dance Break)"	Ben Fankhauser, Matthew Schechter, Lewis Grosso, Kara Lindsay, Ryan Breslin, Newsies Company	4:56

=== Filmed Hollywood stage production ===
In July 2016, it was announced that the North American touring production would be filmed at the Pantages Theatre in Hollywood, Los Angeles with a limited national release in movie theaters from February 16–18, 2017. Due to high demand, a fourth showing was added for March 4, 2017. Some alumni from the Broadway production reprised their leading roles, notably Jeremy Jordan as Jack, Kara Lindsay as Katherine, Ben Fankhauser as Davey, Andrew Keenan-Bolger as Crutchie and Tommy Bracco as Spot Conlon. Several ensemble tracks were added to the show to provide roles for swings. A two-day encore presentation of the production was shown in theaters on August 5 and 9, 2017.

On the 25th anniversary of the original film's theatrical release, April 10, 2017, it was announced the filmed stage production would be released for digital download on May 23, 2017. The recording was later added onto the Disney+ streaming service.

== Licensing ==
A licensed version of the show, based on the changes made for the touring production, was released by Music Theatre International on March 1, 2018.

As a promotional event for the release, Disney Theatrical Group, MTI, and Playbill created the "Seize the Day Challenge," a campaign in which schools and community theaters could send in videos of various service projects they took part in, in exchange for free rights to perform the show. Forty-three schools and organizations participated, with Premier Arts and Science Charter School being selected the winner from over two million votes.

=== Junior version ===
In early 2022, a one-hour adaptation of the musical was released by MTI to be used in middle school and youth theater productions. The one-act interpretation follows the same plot as the original, but omits the songs "The Bottom Line", "That's Rich", "I Never Planned On You/Don't Come a-Knocking", "Watch What Happens (reprise)", "The Bottom Line (reprise)", and "Something To Believe In", as well as additional reprises and tags featured in the full-length version. A new song titled "Just a Pretty Face" is featured and re-uses music from cut songs "That's Rich" and "Don't Come a-Knocking". Many male characters have been rewritten into female characters, with Finch, Henry, Mush, and Elmer becoming Muriel, Pigtails, Hazel, and Nancy, respectively. The Junior version also features characters Ada, Olive, and Ethel, three performers who work at Medda's theater. Additionally, the settings of the rooftop and Jacobi's Deli are omitted, with the rooftop scenes taking place in an alleyway and the Deli scenes on the streets. As is typical for MTI's Broadway Junior shows, all instances of strong language and sexual innuendos are removed or reworked.

Newsies Jr. is the 50th title in Music Theatre International's Broadway Junior lineup and can be licensed for performance on the company's website.

== Awards and nominations ==
=== Original Broadway production ===
Year	Award	Category	Nominee	Result	Ref
2012	Tony Awards	Best Musical		Nominated	
2012	Tony Awards	Best Book of a Musical	Harvey Fierstein	Nominated	
2012	Tony Awards	Best Actor in a Musical	Jeremy Jordan	Nominated	
2012	Tony Awards	Best Direction of a Musical	Jeff Calhoun	Nominated	
2012	Tony Awards	Best Choreography	Christopher Gattelli	Won	
2012	Tony Awards	Best Original Score	Alan Menken and Jack Feldman	Won	
2012	Tony Awards	Best Orchestrations	Danny Troob	Nominated	
2012	Tony Awards	Best Scenic Design of a Musical	Tobin Ost and Sven Ortel	Nominated	
2012	Drama Desk Award	Outstanding Musical		Nominated	
2012	Drama Desk Award	Outstanding Actor in a Musical	Jeremy Jordan	Nominated	
2012	Drama Desk Award	Outstanding Choreography	Christopher Gattelli	Won	
2012	Drama Desk Award	Outstanding Music	Alan Menken	Won	
2012	Drama Desk Award	Outstanding Lyrics	Jack Feldman	Nominated	
2012	Drama Desk Award	Outstanding Orchestrations	Danny Troob	Nominated	
2012	Astaire Awards	Outstanding Male Dancer in a Broadway Musical	Jeremy Jordan	Nominated	
2012	Astaire Awards	Outstanding Male Dancer in a Broadway Musical	Ryan Breslin	Nominated	
2012	Astaire Awards	Outstanding Male Dancer in a Broadway Musical	Thayne Jasperson	Nominated	
2012	Astaire Awards	Outstanding Male Dancer in a Broadway Musical	Ryan Steele	Nominated	
2012	Astaire Awards	Outstanding Male Dancer in a Broadway Musical	Ephraim Sykes	Nominated	
2012	Astaire Awards	Outstanding Female Actor in a Broadway Musical	Kara Lindsay	Nominated	
2013	Grammy Award	Best Musical Theater Album		Nominated	
2013	Young Artist Award	Best Young Actor in Live Theater	Lewis Grosso	Nominated	

=== 2022 London production ===
Year	Award	Category	Nominee	Result	Ref
2023	Laurence Olivier Award	Best Theatre Choreographer	Matt Cole	Won	
