= John Behlmann =

American actor and (born 1982)

- Behlmann in 2026
- Born: John Martin Behlmann; January 25, 1982 (age 44); Florissant, Missouri, U.S.
- Occupations: Actor; singer; voice artist
- Years active: 2005–present
- Known for: Shucked; The Great Gatsby; Tootsie
- Spouse: LJ Wright (m. 2020)

John Behlmann is an American actor known for such plays, musicals, films and television series as The 39 Steps, Significant Other, Tootsie, The Wolf of Wall Street, Revolutionary Road, Guiding Light, All My Children, Shucked and The Great Gatsby.

== Education ==
He is a graduate of Wesleyan University and The National Theatre Conservatory.

== Personal life ==
John Behlmann was born in Florissant, Missouri outside of St. Louis. He moved to England when he was in grade school, living there for two years. After England he moved to Katy, Texas, where he lived until moving to Connecticut to attend Wesleyan University. After graduation he attended the national Theater Conservatory in Denver and moved to New York to pursue his love of theater. John Behlmann continues to live in New York with his wife and two children.

== Filmography ==
=== Film ===
Year	Title	Role	Notes
2005	Unstoppable	Dave	Short film
2008	Pretty Bird	Corporate hotshot #1	
2008	Revolutionary Road	Mr. Brace	
2013	The Wolf of Wall Street	Rothschild broker #2	
2014	Lies I Told My Little Sister	Nick Miller	
2015	Stryka	Peterson	Short film
2017	The Details	John	Short film
2018	Above All Things	Bobby	
2019	Standing Up, Falling Down	Owen	
2022	Confess, Fletch	Owen	

=== Television ===
Year	Title	Role	Notes
2006	3 lbs	James Parks	Episode: "Of Two Minds"
2007	Guiding Light	Jack Summers	3 episodes
2009	All My Children	Dr. Burke	4 episodes
2009	Heckle U	"Big Handsome" Janssen	Web series; 4 episodes
2010	The Good Wife	Dr. Mann	Episode: "Doubt"
2014	Blue Bloods	Officer Timothy Doherty	Episode: "Knockout Game"
2016	Odd Mom Out	Nico	Episode: "Crushed"
2017	Good Behavior	Agent Backup	2 episodes
2018	Riverdale	Agent Arthur Adams	5 episodes
2018	Instinct	Brett Miller	Episode: "Long Shot"
2023	The Gilded Age	Edward Morgan	Episode: "Some Sort of Trick"
2024	Elsbeth	Fire Marshall Jake Turling	Episode: "The Wrong Stuff"

=== Video games ===
Year	Title	Role
2010	World of Warcraft: Cataclysm	Neptulon
2013	Grand Theft Auto V	The Local Population
2014	Hearthstone: Heroes of Warcraft	Lord Barov, Neptulon, Wounded Footman
2016	World of Warcraft: Legion	Neptulon, Master Mathias Shaw, Aethas Sunreaver
2018	World of Warcraft: Battle for Azeroth	Master Mathias Shaw
2020	World of Warcraft: Shadowlands	Master Mathias Shaw
2022	World of Warcraft: Dragonflight	Master Mathias Shaw

== Awards and nominations ==
Year	Award	Category	Work	Result	Ref
2024	Grammy Awards	Best Musical Theater Album	Shucked	Nominated	
