= Kevin Carolan =

American actor and comedian

Kevin Carolan (born May 22, 1968) is an American actor and comedian. During his career, he has had roles on television, stage, and film.

== Career ==
Carolan graduated from Montclair State University in 1990 with a major in theater and film studies.

His Broadway/National Tour credits include: Newsies, Chicago, Dirty Blonde, City Center Encores!: Pardon My English, The Ritz and Come From Away.

His regional theater credits include: The Jungle Book, Lips Together, Teeth Apart (George Street Playhouse); A Thousand Clowns (Studio Arena); Dirty Blonde (Hangar Theatre); Kudzu (Ford's Theater, Goodspeed), Happy Days the Musical, A Streetcar Named Desire.

His television appearances include: Boardwalk Empire, The Middle, Sonny With a Chance, Fringe, White Collar, Curb Your Enthusiasm, Spin City, Trinity, Orange Is the New Black, and the Law & Order franchise.

== Private life ==
Carolan was married to writer Maryann Carolan. They have two children together. Kevin Carolan was raised in Wanaque, New Jersey and attended St Francis Parochial Elementary School and Neumann Prep High School.
