= So Cold the River =

- Directed by: Paul Shoulberg
- Screenplay by: Paul Shoulberg
- Based on: So Cold the River by Michael Koryta
- Produced by: John Robert Armstrong; Zachary Spicer; Claire Tuft
- Starring: Bethany Joy Lenz
- Cinematography: Madeline Kate Kann
- Edited by: Sofi Marshall
- Music by: Ariel Marx
- Release date: March 25, 2022
- Running time: 95 minutes
- Country: United States
- Language: English

So Cold the River is a 2022 horror film that was written and directed by Paul Shoulberg. It is based on the novel by the same name by Michael Koryta.

== Synopsis ==
Erica is a documentary filmmaker who gave up on her career after one of her prior subjects did something unspeakable. She's persuaded to once again return to this field by Alyssa, the daughter of dying and mysterious billionaire Campbell Bradford. She is tasked with profiling his life, including his ties to his hometown, but Erica is given few clues as to his past other than a bottle of water from a local spring. Erica travels to a resort he once frequented, where she discovers that Campbell is tied to a dark, disturbing history full of evil.

== Cast ==
- Bethany Joy Lenz as Erica Shaw
- Alysia Reiner as Alyssa Bradford-Cohen
- Katie Sarife as Kellyn Cage
- Andrew J. West as Josiah Bradford
- Michael J Rogers as Campbell
- Deanna Dunagan as Anne McKinney
- Kevin Cahoon as Dylan
- Kingston Vernes as Lucas Granger
- Aaron Roman Weiner as Rory Granger
- Hannah Baker as Extra #12
- Ashley Dowling as Extra #13

== Production ==
Filming for So Cold the River took place at the French Lick Resort and West Baden Springs Hotel in West Baden Springs, Orange County, Indiana.

== Release ==
So Cold the River was given a limited theatrical release in the United States on March 25, 2022, followed by a VOD release the following week.

== Reception ==
So Cold the River holds a rating of 58% on Rotten Tomatoes, based on 12 reviews, with an average rating of 6.6/10.
