= Little House on the Prairie (musical) =

- Poster for the original 2008 Guthrie production
- Music: Rachel Portman
- Lyrics: Donna di Novelli
- Book: Rachel Sheinkin
- Basis: Little House on the Prairie by Laura Ingalls Wilder
- Productions: 2009-2010 1st National tour (US); 2009 Paper Mill Playhouse Millburn, New Jersey; 2008 Guthrie Minneapolis, Minnesota

Little House on the Prairie is a book musical adapted from the children's books, Little House on the Prairie, by Laura Ingalls Wilder.

The creative team includes Rachel Sheinkin (book), Rachel Portman (music), Donna di Novelli (lyrics), and Francesca Zambello (director). The musical premiered in regional theatre at the Guthrie, Minneapolis, Minnesota, followed by a tour in 2009-2010 of the United States, starting at the Paper Mill Playhouse in Millburn, New Jersey.

The musical takes place in the 1880s, when the Ingalls family takes advantage of the government opening land for settlement in the Dakota Territory.

== Production history ==
Gilbert at the Starlight Theatre in Kansas City, MO. in June 2010

The musical premiered at the Guthrie Theater, Minneapolis, Minnesota and ran from July 26 in previews, opening August 15, through October 19, 2008. It broke numerous records at the Guthrie.

The cast included Melissa Gilbert as "Ma", Steve Blanchard as "Pa", Kara Lindsay (Laura), Jenn Gambatese (Mary), Sara Jean Ford (Nellie), Kevin Massey (Almanzo Wilder) and Brian Muller (Clarence Brewster).

The musical then began a 5-week engagement at the Paper Mill Playhouse, Millburn, New Jersey, on September 10, 2009, prior to a US National tour that began in October 2009 at the Ordway Theatre, St. Paul, Minnesota. Gilbert, Blanchard, Lindsay and Massey continue their roles.

Direction is by Francesca Zambello, with choreography by Michele Lynch (Broadway's Everyday Rapture, Coast of Utopia), scenic design by Adrianne Lobel, costume design by Jess Goldstein (Broadway's Jersey Boys), and lighting design by Mark McCullough.

The First National U.S. Touring Cast (2009–2010) included: Kara Lindsay as "Laura", Melissa Gilbert as "Ma", Steve Blanchard as "Pa", Kevin Massey as "Almanzo Wilder", Alessa Neeck as "Mary", Kate Loprest as "Nellie", and Carly Rose Sonenclar as "Carrie".

The cast also included (in alphabetical order) Taylor Bera, Michael Boxleitner, Megan Campanile, Kurt Engh, Shawn Hamilton, Jessica Hershberg, Meredith Inglesby, Caroline Innerbichler, Lizzie Klemperer, Garen McRoberts, Brian Muller, Will Ray, Tyler Rhodes, Gayle Samuels, Dustin Sullivan, Todd Thurston, Tony Vierling and Christian Whelan. (Playbill program notes)

Prior to these productions, workshop presentations were held April 16–17, 2007; the cast included Melissa Gilbert and Patrick Swayze.

Upon closing, Broadway Licensing acquired the rights for stock and amateur performance rights.

== Synopsis ==
Act 1

The Federal government opened the Dakota Territory for settlers in the 1880s. Pa decides to move to the Territory, and while their daughter Laura is eager for the move, Ma is not certain. She finally sees that this is a good opportunity, and the family, including the young daughters Laura, Mary and Carrie, moves, settling in De Smet. They build "a little house on the prairie" there.

Laura causes some problems in her new school, and the girls are sent home, where Ma wonders about the differences between her daughters ("How Can You Be So Good?"). In the winter, blizzards cut the town off from supplies, and the young settler Almanzo and Cap Garland go out in search of food for the town ("Blizzard"). Pa blames himself for subjecting his family to dangers, as Ma, Carrie and Mary become ill. Laura tries to help Mary when Mary starts to lose her sight by telling her that "I'll Be Your Eyes".

Finally the spring and summer arrive, and with the good weather comes a good wheat crop. Almanzo invites Laura to go for a carriage ride, but a fire destroys the wheat crop and the family is left with no money. Laura decides to aid the family to pay for Mary to attend a school for the blind, by teaching many miles away.

== Songs ==
Note: as presented at the Paper Mill Playhouse, 2009; differences from the Guthrie production noted

Act I

- Overture - Orchestra
- Thunder – Laura
- Up Ahead – Full Company
- The Prairie Moves – Pa
- Old Enough – Almanzo
- Make It Home – The Ingalls
- Up Ahead (reprise) – Pa, Almanzo, Men
- Country Girls –Nellie, Sarah, Ida, Laura, Mary, Carrie
- I Can Rock – Laura, Miss Wilder, School Children
- (How Can You Be So) Good?§§ – Laura, Ma
- Fire in the Kitchen §§– The Ingalls
- Uncle Sam, Where Are You? – Pa, Almanzo, Cap, Full Company
- Blizzard §
- Tin Cup – Pa
- I'll Be Your Eyes – Laura, Mary
- Almost Wheat §
- Go Like the Wind – Almanzo, Laura, Pa, Full Company
- I'll Be Your Eyes (reprise) – Laura, Mary

Act II

- Entr'acte - Orchestra
- Prairie Strong – Full Company
- Without An Enemy – Nellie
- (How Can You Be So) Good? (Reprise) – Laura, Mary
- Faster – Laura, Almanzo
- Faster (Reprise) - Laura, Almanzo
- Faster (Reprise II) - Laura, Schoolchildren
- Teacher Girl §§ – Mrs. Brewster
- Leaving – Almanzo
- Make It Home (Reprise) – Mary
- Restless Heart §§ – Laura
- Wild Child – Ma
- Go Like the Wind (Reprise) §
- Finale – Laura, Almanzo, The Ingalls, Full Company

§ Not in Paper Mill/tour version

§§ New/renamed

== Reception ==
In the review of the musical at the Paper Mill Playhouse, The New York Times wrote "Kara Lindsay is filled with the same kind of charm and youthful exuberance that Ms. Gilbert exhibited in the role".

The New Jersey Star Ledger "Rachel Portman's music has the right feel of the 19th Century west, and conveys the majesty of wide-open spaces".

The Houston Artsweek reviewer praised the score, calling it "lush,” and the performers, noting that Kara Lindsay "shines" and that "Steve Blanchard gives a great performance as Pa Ingalls, and Kevin Massey packs a theatrical punch as Laura’s beau, Almanzo".
