= Kara Lindsay =

American stage actress and singer

- Born: Kara Lynn Lindsay; February 16, 1985 (age 41); Rochester, New York, U.S.
- Education: Carnegie Mellon University (BFA)
- Occupations: Actress; singer
- Years active: 2009–present
- Spouse: Kevin Massey (m. 2013)
- Children: 1

Kara Lynn Massey (born February 16, 1985), known professionally as Kara Lindsay, is an American stage actress and singer, best known for her roles as Katherine Plumber in Newsies (2012) and Glinda in Wicked (2014, 2016, 2018, 2019).

== Education ==
Kara Lynn Lindsay was born in Rochester, New York, and attended Greece Athena High School before studying at Carnegie Mellon University, where she received a BFA in acting/musical theatre.

== Career ==
In 2009, Lindsay appeared as Laura in a musical theatre production at the Paper Mill Playhouse of Little House on the Prairie with Melissa Gilbert, who played Laura in the original television series, as "Ma". Lindsay originated the role of Katherine Plumber in Newsies, a Disney musical written for the stage by Harvey Fierstein, in 2011. The character is the fictional love interest of protagonist Jack Kelly, but Lindsay said she drew inspiration for her portrayal from the real-life investigative journalist, Nellie Bly. She continued her role when Newsies moved to Broadway and played her final performance on February 2, 2014.

From April 2 to November 23, 2014, Lindsay played the role of Glinda in the second national tour of Wicked, where she starred opposite Laurel Harris as Elphaba. She then reprised the role of Glinda on Broadway on December 16, 2014, until January 31, 2016, when she was replaced by Carrie St. Louis, who had previously replaced her on tour as Glinda. On November 1, 2016, Lindsay returned to the role of Glinda on Broadway, replacing Carrie St. Louis. She returned to the 2nd national tour of Wicked in 2018, and exited the company, alongside Jackie Burns, on February 24, 2019, in Salt Lake City.

== Personal life ==
In 2008, Lindsay and Kevin Massey met at the final callbacks for Little House on the Prairie. They began dating around 2009, when the show went on tour, and became engaged after the tour had ended. Lindsay married Massey on June 2, 2013. Together they have a son, Emerson Charles Massey, who was born on November 12, 2019. Lindsay and Massey appear annually at the Disney Epcot International Festival of Arts in Orlando, Florida.

In February 2025, Lindsay revealed that she had been diagnosed with stage two breast cancer in late 2024. Lindsay completed chemotherapy in January 2025.

== Filmography ==
Year	Title	Role	Notes
2017	Disney's Newsies the Broadway Musical	Katherine Plumber	

=== Television ===
Year	Title	Role	Notes
2011	Macy's Thanksgiving Day Parade	Katherine Plumber	
2012	Submissions Only	Composition Callbacks Group 2	Episode: "The Growing Interconnectedness"
2013	Working in the Theatre	Herself	Episode: "The Anatomy of a Song"
2018	Murphy Brown	Callie	Episode: "Results May Vary"

=== Theater ===
Year	Title	Role	Notes
2009-2010	Little House on the Prairie	Laura Ingalls	National tour
2011	Cabaret	Sally Bowles	Starlight Theatre (Kansas City, Missouri)
2011	Newsies	Katherine Plumber	Paper Mill Playhouse
2012–2014	Newsies	Katherine Plumber	Nederlander Theatre
2014	Wicked	Glinda	2nd North American Tour
2016	Mary Poppins	Mary Poppins	North Carolina Theatre
2014–2016	Wicked	Glinda	Gershwin Theatre
2016	Newsies	Katherine Plumber	Pantages Theatre
2016–2017	Wicked	Glinda	Gershwin Theatre
2017, 2018	Beautiful: The Carole King Musical	Cynthia Weil	Stephen Sondheim Theatre
2018	Singin' In The Rain	Kathy Selden	Sacramento Music Circus
2018–2019	Wicked	Glinda	2nd North American Tour
2019	Beautiful: The Carole King Musical	Cynthia Weil	Stephen Sondheim Theatre
2023	Mary Poppins	Mary Poppins	North Carolina Theatre
2024	Once Upon A Mattress	Princess Winnifred (standby)	Encores!
2024	Once Upon A Mattress	Princess Winnifred (standby)	Hudson Theatre
2025	Romy & Michele: The Musical	Michele Weinberger	Stage 42
2026	Shrek the Musical	Princess Fiona	The Muny
2026	Mary Poppins	Mary Poppins	Paper Mill Playhouse
