= Caroline Innerbichler =

American stage actress

- Born: California, U.S.
- Education: University of Minnesota (attended)
- Occupation: Actress
- Years active: 2001–present
- Website: carolineinnerbichler.com

Caroline Innerbichler is an American stage actress best known for her role as Anna in the North American tour of Frozen, and as Maizy in Shucked on Broadway.

== Early life and education ==
Innerbichler was born in Southern California, but grew up in Eagan, Minnesota, with her sister, Allison. Their parents frequently took the two of them to theater productions. She first acted at age 10 in a community theater production of Annie at Eagan High School. Afterwards, she began taking voice and acting lessons.

After graduating from Eagan High School, Innerbichler attended the BFA Guthrie Actor Training program at the University of Minnesota, but dropped out after her first year.

== Career ==
Innerbichler's first professional theater gig was as Annika in Pippi Longstocking in 2001, at age 12, with Children's Theatre Company in Minneapolis. She continued working as a professional through high school.

After leaving her college program, she began working as a professional in the Twin Cities and in other regional theaters. In 2008 she was cast in Little House on the Prairie as an ensemble member and an understudy for Nellie Oleson. She went on to tour with the show, with rehearsals beginning when she was 21. Her first lead performance was in 2014, as Ariel in Chanhassen Dinner Theatres' production of The Little Mermaid.

Innerbichler eventually moved to the West Coast to pursue work in Santa Barbara.

While visiting friends in Chicago, Innerbichler auditioned for Frozen, and received a final callback for the Broadway production. Although she did not receive the role, she was later invited to audition for the national tour, where she was cast as Anna. The tour, which began in late 2019, went on hiatus in 2020 due to the COVID-19 pandemic. It resumed performances again in September 2021, and Innerbichler remained with the tour until March 2022.

During Frozen's hiatus, Innerbichler was made aware of Shucked and began working with the show's team. In April 2023 she made her Broadway debut in the show as Maizy. On September 3, 2023, Innerbichler performed as Maizy for the last time, sharing news of her pregnancy. Isabelle McCalla -- a veteran of Broadway's The Prom, Aladdin and Hercules -- replaced Innerbichler as Maizy beginning September 8, 2023.

== Credits ==
=== Theater ===
| Year(s) | Production | Role | Location | Category |
|---|---|---|---|---|
| 2008 | Little House on the Prairie | Ensemble, Nellie Orson (understudy) | Guthrie Theater | |
| 2009–2010 | Little House on the Prairie | Ensemble, Nellie Orson (understudy) | | North American Tour |
| 2012 | Ragtime | Evelyn Nesbit | Park Square Theater | |
| 2012 | Bye Bye Birdie | Ensemble | Chanhassen Dinner Theatres | |
| 2013 | Bessie's Birthday | Bessie | Theater Latte Da | |
| 2013 | Fiddler on the Roof | Chava | Chanhassen Dinner Theatres | |
| 2014 | The Little Mermaid | Ariel | Chanhassen Dinner Theatres | |
| 2014 | Jane Austen's Pride and Prejudice | Mary Bennet | | Industry reading |
| 2015 | The Pirates of Penzance | Ensemble | Ordway Center for the Performing Arts | |
| 2015–2016 | The Sound of Music | Liesl von Trapp | Ordway Center for the Performing Arts | |
| 2016 | Broadway Songbook: Rebels! On Broadway | | Ordway Center for the Performing Arts | |
| 2016 | White Christmas | Ensemble | Ordway Center for the Performing Arts | |
| 2017 | Grease | Sandy | Chanhassen Dinner Theatres | |
| 2017 | Austen's Pride | | | Industry reading |
| 2017 | Miss Bennet: Christmas at Pemberley | Lydia | Ensemble Theatre Company | |
| 2018 | Mamma Mia! | Sophie | Ordway Center for the Performing Arts | |
| 2019 | Guys and Dolls | | Guthrie Theater | |
| 2019–2022 | Frozen | Anna | | National tour |
| 2022 | Shucked | Maizy | Pioneer Theatre Company | |
| 2023 | Shucked | Maizy | Nederlander Theatre | Broadway |

=== Television ===
| Year | Title | Role(s) | Notes | Ref. |
|---|---|---|---|---|
| 2026 | Helluva Boss | Willow Wackford; Wendy Wackford | Voice roles; episode: "Bad Reputation" | |

== Awards ==
| Year | Award | Category | Work | Result | Ref |
|---|---|---|---|---|---|
| 2023 | Outer Critics Circle Awards | Outstanding Lead Performer in a Broadway Musical | Shucked | Nominated | |
| 2023 | Theatre World Award | Outstanding Debut Performance in a Broadway or Off-Broadway Production | Shucked | Honoree | |
| 2024 | Grammy Awards | Best Musical Theater Album | Shucked | Nominated | |

== Personal life ==
Innerbichler lives in New York City with her partner, Sean, and dog, Finna. She plays ukulele and has ADHD.
