= A Killer Party =

2020 digital remotely performed musical by Jason Howland and Nathan Tysen

- Written by: Rachel Axler; Kait Kerrigan
- Directed by: Marc Bruni
- Starring: Krystina Alabado; Jackie Burns; Carolee Carmello; Miguel Cervantes; Drew Gehling; Jeremy Jordan; Alex Newell; Laura Osnes; Michael James Scott; Jarrod Spector; Jessica Keenan Wynn
- Composers: Jason Howland (music); Nathan Tysen (lyrics)
- Country of origin: United States
- Original language: English

Production
- Producers: Kevin Duda; Jason Howland
- Production location: Virtual
- Editors: Christie Fall; Matt Hoffman; Kristin Klinger
- Camera setup: Videotelephony
- Running time: 85 minutes
- Production companies: Kevin Duda Productions; HMS Media; Mystery Musical

Original release
- Network: Vimeo
- Release: August 5 – August 19, 2020

A Killer Party: A Murder Mystery Musical is a digital remotely performed musical created in 2020 during the COVID-19 pandemic. It began streaming as a 9-episode web series on Vimeo on August 5, 2020. Its creative team includes Jason Howland (Music), Nathan Tysen (Lyrics), Rachel Axler and Kait Kerrigan (Book), Marc Bruni (Direction), Bobby Pearce (Costume Design), Billy Jay Stein (Music Producer) and HMS Media (Video Post-Production).

The virtual musical was produced by Kevin Duda & Jason Howland.

On August 11, 2020, Music Theater International acquired the licensing rights to the musical.

== Plot ==
In Duluth, Minnesota, Varthur McArthur, the artistic director of a struggling theater company, invites his cast and crew to a virtual reading of his new project, an “immersive murder mystery dinner party.” During the event, McArthur is unexpectedly killed, turning the gathering into an actual murder investigation.

The dinner guests – Vivika Orsonwelles, Lily Wright, George Murderer, Cameron Mitchelljohn, Clark Staples, and Shea Crescendo – each have ties to McArthur and possible motives for his death. The case is assigned to Detective Justine Case, a police officer recently reassigned from parking duty. Conducting her investigation remotely, she interviews each suspect in isolation and begins to uncover rivalries, personal relationships, and long-standing tensions within the theater troupe.

Told through a series of short musical episodes, the story incorporates parody and self-referential humor, blending elements of classic whodunits with the limitations of online performance during the COVID-19 pandemic. The songs, composed by Jason Howland with lyrics by Nathan Tysen, provide structure to the narrative and emphasize the show’s comic tone.

== Original cast ==
Actor	Role
Jessica Keenan Wynn	Justine Case
Michael James Scott	Varthur McArthur and Arthur McArthur
Krystina Alabado	Lily Wright
Carolee Carmello	Detective Case
Drew Gehling	Cameron Mitchelljohn
Jackie Burns	Joan McArthur
Laura Osnes	Vivika Orsonwelles
Jarrod Spector	George Murderer
Alex Newell	Shea Crescendo
Miguel Cervantes	Clarke Staples
Jeremy Jordan	Jeremy Jordan
Dana Costello	Ensemble
Rashidra Scott	Ensemble
Yasmeen Sulieman	Ensemble
