= Jason Howland =

Theatre playwright and composer

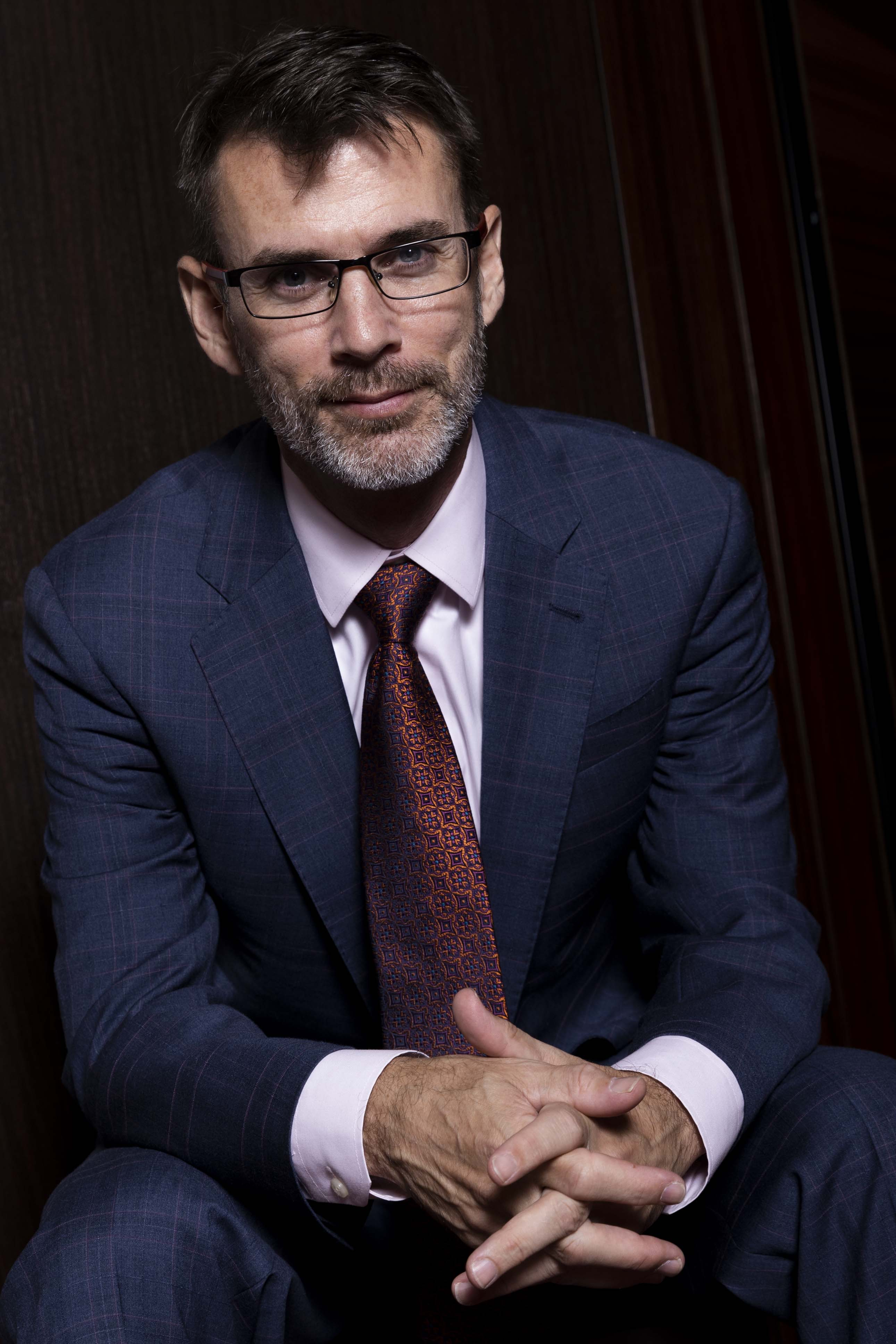
- Born: Concord, Massachusetts
- Occupations: producer, music director, conductor, playwright, composer

Jason Howland is a musical theatre composer, playwright, conductor, music director, and producer. In 2015, he won the Grammy Award for Best Musical Theater Album for his work producing the cast recording of Beautiful: The Carole King Musical. He also wrote the music for the Broadway musical Little Women. He was a producer on the 2023 musical Shucked, for which he earned nominations for the Tony Award for Best Orchestrations, Drama Desk Award for Outstanding Orchestrations, and the Grammy Award for Best Musical Theater Album.

== Biography ==
Howland was born June 16, 1971, in Concord, Massachusetts, and grew up in Williamstown, Massachusetts. As a teenager, he attended Berkshire Ensemble for the Theatre Arts (a camp for aspiring musical-theatre composers and librettists). While at Williams College, he was called to be an intern on the 1992 Vivian Matalon workshop of Jekyll & Hyde and worked his way up, becoming friendly with both composer Frank Wildhorn and arranger James Raitt, and eventually became the music director and conductor of the 1997 Broadway production.

In 2002, Howland wrote a play with Larry Pellegrini called Blessing in Disguise which premiered Off-Broadway.

His assorted credits include musical director for Beautiful: The Carole King Musical, music supervisor for The Scarlet Pimpernel and The Civil War, music director of Les Misérables, music director of Taboo, and supervising music director/incidental & dance music arrangements/vocal music arrangements of Wonderland. He also produced The Lonesome West with Davis.

In 2005, he was the producer of Little Women with Dani Davis. The original songwriters were released, and Howland stepped down from producing to write the music with lyrics by Mindi Dickstein with a book by Allan Knee.

As of 2007, he was working on two new musicals, Mariel and Quickstepf.

He has also appeared as a guest conductor with the Atlanta Symphony Orchestra, The Florida Orchestra, New Jersey Symphony Orchestra, Maine State Symphony, and Memphis Symphony Orchestra. He also has conducted for Ray Charles, Natalie Cole, Brandy, BeBe and CeCe Winans, Carl Anderson, Linda Eder, Sebastian Bach, David Hasselhoff, Rob Evan, Kate Shindle, Lauren Kennedy, Davis Gaines, the Kingston Trio, and Lizz Wright.

His other works include writing scores for Handel’s Messiah Rocks: A Joyful Noise and the webisode series The Broadroom, and music arrangement for Macy's 4th of July Fireworks in 2024.

In July 2023, it was announced that Howland and Nathan Tysen would premiere their score for a new musical adaptation of F. Scott Fitzgerald's The Great Gatsby in October of that same year at the Paper Mill Playhouse. The musical will feature a book by Kait Kerrigan and direction by Marc Bruni.

== Works ==
- Little Women, 2004
- Blessing in Disguise, 2002
- Wonderland, 2011
- A Killer Party, 2020
- Ikiru, 2020
- Paradise Square, 2022
- Christmas in Connecticut, 2022
- The Great Gatsby, 2023
- Shucked, 2023
- A Man, 2025

== Awards and nominations ==
Year	Award	Category	Work	Result	Ref
2015	Grammy Awards	Best Musical Theater Album	Beautiful: The Carole King Musical	Won	
2023	Tony Awards	Best Orchestrations	Shucked	Nominated	
2023	Drama Desk Awards	Outstanding Ochestrations	Shucked	Nominated	
2023	Outer Critics Circle Awards	Outstanding Orchestrations	Shucked	Nominated	
2024	Grammy Awards	Best Musical Theater Album	Shucked	Nominated	
