= Ozark Actors Theatre =

American theater company based in Rolla, Missouri

- Formation: 1987
- Headquarters: Rolla, Missouri
- Stage Manager: Jim Welch
- Website: www.ozarkactorstheatre.org

Ozark Actors Theatre is an Equity theater company in Rolla, Missouri, founded in 1987.

== History ==
Ozark Actors Theatre was founded in 1987 by pianist Gail Andrews-Hintz and founding artistic director F. Reed Brown, with the help of actress Cindy Beger and her friend Kathy Pukas.

In 1993, the Cedar Street Playhouse became the home of Ozark Actors Theatre. Ozark Actors Theatre quickly gained a reputation for doing quality theatrical productions, and drew acclaim in Missouri and nationwide. In 2010 Jason Cannon became the artistic director, and Pamela Reckamp took the position in 2015.

== Description ==
The company is based in Rolla, Missouri, and is the only Equity theatre in the area. They are affiliated with the Missouri Arts Council.

== Productions ==
1988

- Godspell
- The Diviners
- Greater Tuna
- Magic to Do

1989

- Bernstein: Music of the Maestro
- I Do! I Do!
- Voices
- The Boys Next Door
- The Foreigner

1990

- Broadway: The Last 10 Years
- The Duck Variations
- Graceland
- Litko
- Savage Love
- Talley's Folly
- The House of Blue Leaves
- Lou Gehrig Did Not Die of Cancer
- Quilters
- A Christmas Carol
- The Actor's Nightmare

1991

- A Christmas Carol
- The Fantasticks
- Barefoot in the Park
- The Elephant Man
- The Songs of Stephen Sondheim
- The Voice of the Prairie

1992

- Nunsense
- The Golden Age of Broadway
- I Hate Hamlet
- Jazz at Castleman
- A Scent of Honeysuckle
- The Actor's Nightmare

1993

- Love Letters
- Nunsense II: The Second Coming

1994

- Dames at Sea
- The Gifts of the Magi
- Marvin's Room
- Sea Horse
- Lend Me a Tenor

1995

- Abundance
- Smoke on the Mountain

1996

- In White America
- On the Air
- Cotton Patch Gospel
- The Golden Age of Entertainment
- The Nerd

1997

- A Command Performance
- Happy Birthday, You're Dead!
- Bye Bye Birdie
- Steel Magnolias

1998

- Big River
- All I Really Need to Know I Learned in Kindergarten
- Wedding Bell Blues

1999

- Aunt Tilly's Funeral
- The Music Man
- Driving Miss Daisy
- Little Shop of Horrors

2000

- Once Upon a Mattress
- Grace and Glorie
- To Kill a Mockingbird

2001

- Annie
- Art
- Arsenic and Old Lace
- The Best Christmas Pageant Ever

2002

- Oklahoma!
- You're a Good Man, Charlie Brown

2003

- Oliver!
- Always... Patsy Cline

2004

- Route 66: A Celebration of America's Mainstreet
- Fiddler on the Roof
- Wait Until Dark
- Nuncrackers

2005

- The Sound of Music
- Forever Plaid
- The Odd Couple
- A Christmas Survival Guide

2006

- Gypsy
- Musical Comedy Murders of 1940
- Joseph and the Amazing Technicolor Dreamcoat

2007

- Godspell
- Anything Goes
- Moon Over Buffalo
- Big: the musical
- White Christmas

2008

- Pump Boys and Dinettes
- The Music Man
- Altar Boyz
- It's a Wonderful Life

2009

- Daddy's Dyin': Who's Got the Will?
- Clue
- A Funny Thing Happened on the Way to the Forum
- Scrooge

2010

- The Mousetrap
- Annie
- The Fantasticks
- Babes in Toyland

2011

- Lend Me a Tenor
- The 25th Annual Putnam County Spelling Bee
- The Crucible
- White Christmas

2012

- 25th Anniversary Gala
- The Wizard of Oz
- Noises Off
- The Diviners
- Follies
- Little Women

2013

- Peter Pan
- Fools
- Into the Woods
- Follies
- The Lion, the Witch and the Wardrobe

2014

- The Comedy of Errors
- Joseph and the Amazing Technicolor Dreamcoat
- The Drowsy Chaperone
- Follies
- Cabaret 1: Hannah Bagnall & Brittany Proia
- Cabaret 2: Blane Pressler & Maglione and Ruiz
- Cabaret 3: Alyssa Flowers & Jake Mills
- A Fairy Tale Christmas Carol

2015

- Meet Me in St. Louis
- The Importance of Being Earnest
- Lucky Stiff
- The Story of Velveteen Rabbit
