= Sentimental Men =

Podcast by Kevin Bianchi and Quincy Brown

Sentimental Men is a podcast hosted by Kevin Bianchi and Quincy Brown. The podcast is devoted to the musical Wicked and specifically to the actresses in the leading roles of Elphaba and Glinda.

== Background ==
Brown and Bianchi started the podcast in 2020. The title of the podcast comes from the song "Sentimental Man" in Act I of Wicked, which the hosts admit they would often skip when listening to the cast album.

== Episode structure ==
Almost every episode of the podcast features an interview with a Broadway performer. Originally, the guests were actresses who had portrayed Elphaba on Broadway or in a touring company. Since its debut, the show has expanded to featuring interviews with other current and former Wicked cast members or Broadway actors who have not been affiliated with the show.

Most episodes include some of the same standard questions for the guest:

- When and how did Wicked come into your life?
- [For actresses who have portrayed Elphaba]: Are you a "The Wizard And I" Elphaba, a "Defying Gravity" Elphaba, or a "No Good Deed" Elphaba?

== Podcast history ==
As of 2024, Bianchi and Brown have interviewed nearly all the actresses who portrayed Elphaba on Broadway.

In October 2022, Theatrely, a Broadway news outlet, announced that Sentimental Men would be hosted on their platform.

In October 2023, for the 20th anniversary of Wicked, Bianchi and Brown moderated a panel about the musical at New York Comic Con.

== Episode list ==
Episode Number	Air Date	Title	Guest(s)
70	April 14, 2025	The Sky Is Not the Limit	Mandy Gonzalez
69	March 24, 2025	The Man Behind the Second Curtain	Gregory Maguire
68	February 24, 2025	The Last Elphaba of an Era	Mary Kate Morrisey
67	February 4, 2025	Elsa and Norma and Karen, Oh My!	Caroline Bowman
66	January 17, 2025	The Yellow Brick Road to Broadway	Trisha Paytas
65	December 27, 2024	Glinda Controls the Weather	Marty Lauter
64	November 15, 2024	This Story Deserves the Best of Us	Cynthia Erivo
63	November 1, 2024	It's Wicked! It Has to Be Earned!	Ariana Grande
62	October 9, 2024	We're Off to See the Movie!	-
61	September 27, 2024	Vouchin' For the Wicked	
60	September 1, 2024	The Authenticity of Elphaba	Laurel Harris
59	July 4, 2024	A Bright-Eyed, Bushy-Tailed, Hydrated Elphaba	Saycon Sengbloh
58	May 17, 2024	How Absolutely Remarkable	-
57	February 13, 2024	Consider Us Teased!	-
56	November 3, 2023	The Evergreen Audacity of Stephanie J. Block	Stephanie J. Block
55	October 27, 2023	The 20th Anniversary Elphaba	Alyssa Joy Fox
54	October 13, 2023	When All Your Dreams Come True	McKenzie Kurtz
53	September 29, 2023	Witch From the East Country	Kimber Elayne Sprawl
52	September 15, 2023	Amber, Galinda, and Elle...Oh, My!	Laura Bell Bundy
51	September 5, 2023	I'm Going to Get Nerdy About This	Emily Kristen Morris
50	August 18, 2023	Janis Is Very Elphaba Coded	Mary Kate Morrisey
49	July 14, 2023	The Friend-Ship of Dreams	Nicole Parker, Lindsay Heather Pearce
48	June 30, 2023	It's Not "No Nice Deed Goes Unpunished"	Olivia Valli
47	April 23, 2023	There's A Drone On the Lam, Sir!	-
45	February 24, 2023	I, Glinda	Jennafer Newberry
44	February 10, 2023	Standing In Your Power	Lissa deGuzman
43	January 27, 2023	It's All Coming Back to Me Now	Lena Hall
42	January 6, 2023	Oh, It Was Iconic, Alright [sic]	Leslie Rodriguez Kritzer
