= Pioneer Theatre Company =

Professional theatre company in Salt Lake City, Utah, United States

Coordinates: 40°45′46.12″N 111°51′4.28″W

- Formation: 1962
- Type: Theatre group
- Location(s): Simmons Pioneer Memorial Theatre; University of Utah; 300 South 1400 East; Salt Lake City, UT, USA 84112
- Artistic director: Karen Azenberg
- Website: pioneertheatre.org

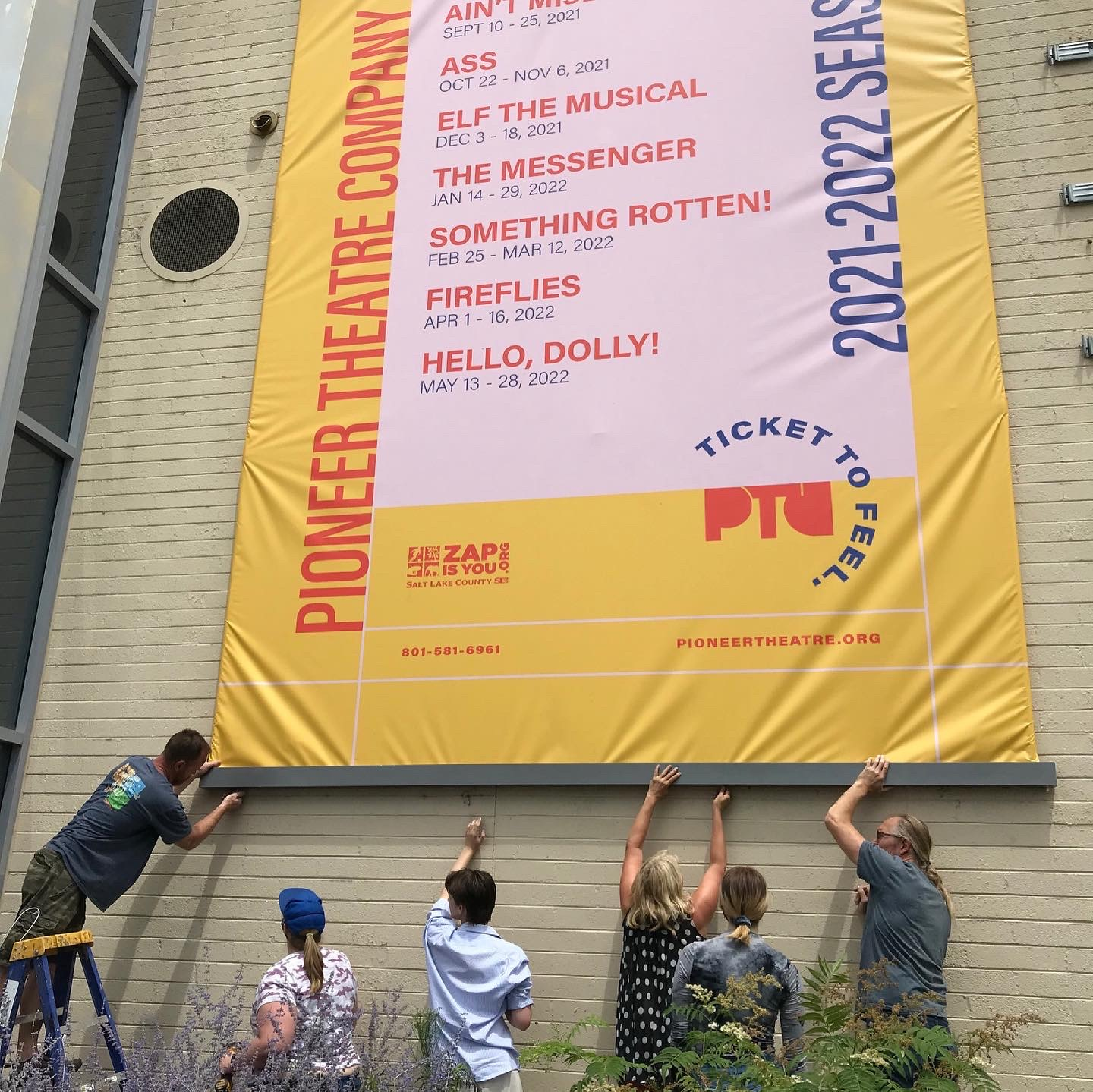
Simmons Pioneer Memorial Theatre, 2021

The Pioneer Theatre Company (PTC) is one of four professional theatre companies in Utah, and the only fully professional theatre in Salt Lake City, contracting with union members belonging to Actors' Equity Association (AEA), Stage Directors and Choreographers Society (SDC) and United Scenic Artists (USA829). PTC was formed in 1962 and performs at the Simmons Pioneer Memorial Theatre on the University of Utah campus in Salt Lake City. The non-profit company produces seven plays each season, running from September to May, including classics, musicals, dramas, and comedies. The company creates its own productions on site, including costumes and scenery, while sometimes using actors and directors from out-of-state. Among a number of premieres, the company produced the nation's first regional premiere of Les Misérables in 2007, giving 82 sold out performances.

== Organization ==
Though PTC performs on the University of Utah campus, the company operates independently and receives no direct funding from the university. The company is a non-profit organization, with 35% of its budget coming from donors, sponsors, and government support. The company is led by acting managing director Diane Parisi and artistic director Karen Azenberg. The company operates on a League of Resident Theatres contract with the Actors' Equity Association.

== Simmons Pioneer Memorial Theatre ==
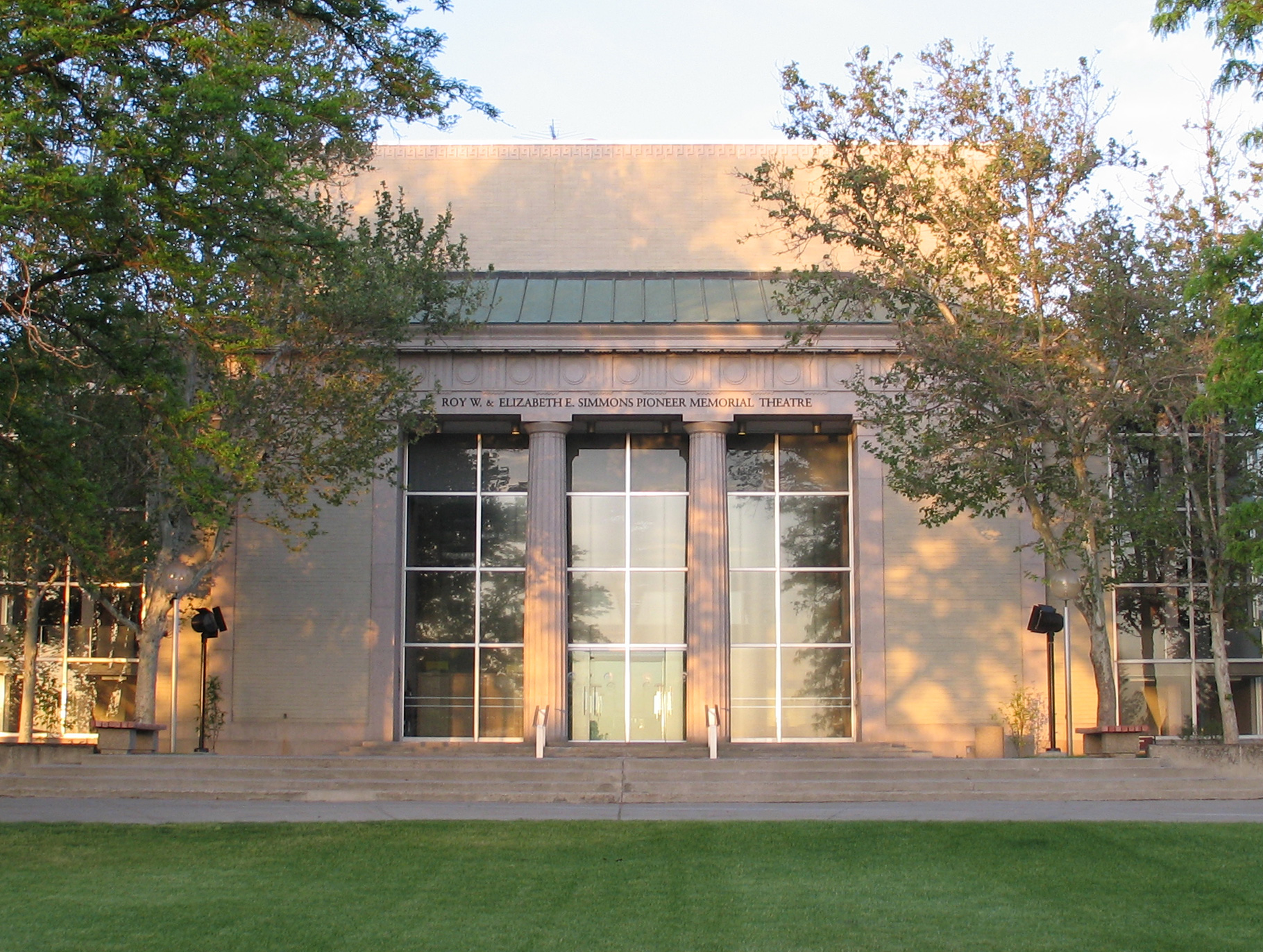
The Simmons Pioneer Memorial Theatre

Pioneer Theatre Company performs at the Roy W. and Elizabeth E. Simmons Pioneer Memorial Theatre, located on the west side of the University of Utah campus in Salt Lake City, Utah. Construction of the theatre building started with a groundbreaking on July 1, 1960, and its architecture was designed to be reminiscent of the historic Salt Lake Theatre once located in the city's downtown. The completed building was opened and dedicated on October 10, 1962, with a production of Hamlet.

The Pioneer Memorial Theatre name was prepended in the 1990s in honor of Roy W. and Elizabeth "Tibby" Simmons, who provided a large donation allowing for expansion of the structure. Roy W. Simmons attended the University of Utah from 1934 to 1937 and was the CEO of Zions Bancorp from 1964 to 1990.

The Lees Main Stage of the theatre is a 932-seat proscenium theatre. The Loge Art Gallery, located on the second floor of the building, is open to the public. Art is selected from local painters, photographers, and sculptors to go with each play of the season.

== Productions ==
The PTC was the first regional theatre company to earn the rights to produce Les Misérables. Though most PTC productions have a run of 19 performances, Les Mis was extended multiple times for a total of 82 sold out performances in 2007, a record for the company.

The company has been responsible for world premieres of revised versions of Paint Your Wagon and The Producers. State premieres include the plays An American Daughter, Arcadia, Doubt, Fences, Proof, and The Vertical Hour. The company has produced major musicals including Chicago, Into the Woods, Cabaret, Natasha, Pierre & The Great Comet of 1812, and Ragtime, and classics and adaptations including Othello, Pride and Prejudice, The Three Musketeers, A Tale of Two Cities, and The Grapes of Wrath. The company's first play in 1962 was Hamlet.

From October 28-November 12, 2022 Pioneer Theatre Company presented the world premiere of Shucked. This marked the first time ever that a Utah-based theatre company had produced an out-of-town tryout for a Broadway musical.

== History ==
Construction of Pioneer Memorial Theatre began with a direct appropriation from the Utah State Legislature, Kennecott Copper, The Church of Jesus Christ of Latter-day Saints and private donors. Construction was completed in 1962. The structure contains three levels and is equipped with two stages. The Main Stage seats 932 guests, while the smaller Babcock Theatre in the basement seats 350. The structure includes five formal classrooms, several rehearsal halls and dressing rooms. These are also used as classrooms and offices for the members of the University of Utah Department of Theatre faculty. Pioneer Memorial Theatre was dedicated in October 1962 as the professional “State Theatre of Utah”, with speeches from University of Utah President A. Ray Olpin, Governor Clyde, Dr. C. Lowell Lees and President David O. McKay. Dr. Lees is named the very first Artistic Director for PMT.

Dr. C. Lowell Lees left the University in 1964 and Keith M. Engar was appointed to succeed him. During his time at Pioneer Theatre, Keith M. Engar created the University Resident Theatre Association (URTA) contract with Actors’ Equity Association. This was the first formalized contract between Actors’ Equity and a university theatre.

In 1984 Charles Morey was hired as Artistic Director of PTC, with specific direction to fully professionalize the theatre, expand the repertoire, and clarify the relationship between PTC and the University of Utah Department of Theatre. PTC moved to a League of Resident Theatres (LORT) contract in 1986 with Actors’ Equity which allowed the theatre to become fully professional.

In 2010, with local developer Cowboy Partners, PTC purchased and renovated the University House at 1300 East and 200 South to provide artist housing for visiting actors, directors, and designers. Renamed the Meldrum House, after lead donors Pete and Catherine Meldrum, the project housed its first cast in the fall of 2011. The renovation budget of $3.2 million was provided by private philanthropic sources.

Karen Azenberg was appointed Artistic Director of PTC in 2012, replacing Charles Morey who stepped down as the longest sitting artistic director of a major American regional theatre.

Managing Director Chris Lino retired in 2019 after 28 years and was replaced by Christopher Massimine. In June 2021, Massimine went on leave after investigations by Fox 13, The Salt Lake Tribune and the New York Times that he falsified information on his resume and his accolades. Development Director Diane L. Parisi was named Acting Managing Director in June 2021. Massimine officially resigned, via a statement to the media, in August 2021.
