= How to Dance in Ohio (musical) =

2022 musical

- Broadway Promotional Poster
- Music: Jacob Yandura
- Lyrics: Rebekah Greer Melocik
- Book: Rebekah Greer Melocik
- Basis: How to Dance in Ohio by Alexandra Shiva
- Premiere: September 21, 2022: Syracuse Stage
- Productions: 2022 Syracuse; 2023 Broadway; 2025 UK

How to Dance in Ohio is a musical with music by Jacob Yandura, lyrics and book by Rebekah Greer Melocik. It was adapted from the 2015 documentary of the same name directed by Alexandra Shiva.

The musical focuses on a group of autistic young adults preparing to attend a Spring Formal dance organized by their counselor, Dr. Amigo. While facing different challenges, including ableism, they experience the joys of supporting one another.

Directed by Sammi Cannold, with choreography by Mayte Natalio, it made its world premiere at Syracuse Stage in September 2022 and later the show transferred to Broadway in November 2023.

== Synopsis ==
=== Act One ===
We meet Caroline, Remy, Drew, Tommy, Mel, Jessica and Marideth, autistic young adults as they go through their daily routine. We also meet Dr. Amigo, who runs a social skills group for autistic people, and his daughter Ashley Amigo, who is on medical leave from college due to an ankle injury, where she is studying dance ("Today Is"). It's Marideth's first time attending the group. Marideth feels hesitant to speak, even though they are each expected to share something with the group. Marideth finally opens her mouth to speak, when Jessica bursts in, apologizing for being late. In the end, Marideth doesn't share and leaves the group early, but she surprises and pleases her dad by telling him she wants to return.

Drew, an academically high achieving senior in high school who got into the University of Michigan for Electrical Engineering, shares that he only wants to attend to make his parents happy and expresses that he wants to attend The Ohio State University instead ("Under Control"). Later on, Drew's parents inform Dr. Amigo that they are unsure if he can handle living away from home, and are upset because they believe Dr. Amigo should have received more support for having taught Drew those skills. Dr. Amigo begins to question his ability to lead the social skills group as a result ("The How-Tos"). He comes up with the idea to have a formal dance to help everyone build their social skills ("How To Dance In Ohio"). He plans to crown two people as the formal king and queen, which makes Mel and Remy uncomfortable, as Mel is non-binary and Remy is questioning their gender.

At a diner, Marideth talks about the animals of Australia while her father tries to talk to her about the formal dance ("Unlikely Animals"). The group is nervous but excited at the idea of the dance. Drew has a crush on Marideth but is afraid to ask her out. Jessica has a crush on Tommy but doesn't know when to ask him out ("Butterflies"). Caroline daydreams about attending the dance with her boyfriend Jay on her way to a Japanese exam ("Slow Dancing").

A blogger talks to Dr. Amigo about possibly doing a piece on the dance, but he declines, saying he doesn't want reporters ("Hello, How Are You?"), but then a reporter that Dr. Amigo admires contacts him. Ashley says he just told the other person he wasn't having reporters, so Dr. Amigo agrees to both the blogger and the reporter. He tells them not to release any articles until after the dance. He has a crush on the reporter, but later learns she is married. Ashley then expresses that she isn't so sure she wants to return to Juilliard after her ankle heals ("Come Home, Recover").

Marideth tells her dad that Jessica and Caroline are going shopping for dresses at Macy's, and her dad suggests going to a discount store. Marideth does not like any of the dresses at the discount store, so her dad asks her which one is the least bad. Jessica and Caroline's moms are happy their daughters are buying dresses because it makes them nostalgic for their own proms, and are glad that their children have an opportunity to attend an accessible dance ("Getting Ready For The Dance"). Meanwhile, Mel has a misunderstanding at work with their manager and becomes overwhelmed, and Drew struggles with the social aspects of asking Marideth to the dance ("Waves and Wires"). He ends up chickening out and instead offers her a book.

=== Act Two ===
Marideth reads Drew's book and confronts her newfound romantic feelings towards him ("Drift"). Ashley finally gathers up the courage to tell Dr. Amigo that she does not want to return to dance school after her ankle injury heals and instead to work at the center. However, he fires her from Amigo Family Counseling, fearing that he is holding her back by letting her use the center as a place to hide instead of fighting for her dreams ("Terminally Human"). Meanwhile, Caroline encourages Jessica to ask Tommy to the dance ("So Much in Common"), but when she finally asks him, he turns her down as he is already going with Mel.

The blogger decides to release the article before the dance despite Dr. Amigo's request, and presents it through an ableist lens even though Dr. Amigo had tried to correct those assumptions in their interview, with the article centering around Amigo and completely objectifying and infantilizing the group members. One-by-one, things begin to fall apart. Jessica and Caroline get into a fight over Caroline's toxic boyfriend ruining their friendship. Tommy scheduled his road test for the day before the dance. He passes, but then drives his brother's truck without his brother's permission, and crashes it. He isn't hurt, but gets grounded. Mel gets the promotion at work but has to cover their co-worker's shift, Marideth refuses to go, and Amigo believes Drew will not come because of a call he made to the University of Michigan lying about Drew wanting to attend there instead of Ohio State ("So Much in Common (Reprise)"/"Chevy Silverado"/"Admissions").

Having overheard the fight between her and her father, Mel comes to comfort Ashley and offer her words of wisdom ("Reincarnation"). The group find out the ableist article and are hurt, with some deciding to not attend the dance in protest ("Two Steps Backward"). Remy turns this into an opportunity to do his first livestream on his channel to improve conversations about disability and educate his audience about ableism ("Nothing At All"). All the parents call Dr. Amigo to tell him all the reasons why their children will be unable to attend the spring formal ("The Amigo Spring Formal"). At the night of the spring formal, believing no one will show up, he is surprised to see Drew, disappointed to see that no one came. However, he does not want to miss the opportunity to dance with Marideth, so he gets the idea to throw another dance the following day at the therapy center ("Building Momentum").

Dr. Amigo apologizes to the group about the article and tells the blogger to take it down. Caroline and Jessica make up, and Caroline reveals that she has broken up with Jay. Marideth's father convinces her to attend the spring formal, and she agrees. Ashley unexpectedly shows up at the dance and announces that she has retired as a dancer and sets clear boundaries with her father. And Mel encourages Dr. Amigo to hire Ashley back with a raise ("The Second Chance Dance"). The second dance is a success, and Drew finally asks Marideth to dance. ("Finale")

== Significance ==
The show is the first Broadway musical to cast autistic actors as autistic characters. In 2024, the show's Authentic Autism Access Team received a Drama Desk Special Award for its support of autistic theatermakers and efforts to improve accessibility for neurodiverse individuals. A 2026 Study published in the Psi Chi Journal of Phsychological Research examined the Broadway production as a potential intervention against autism stigma. Researchers surveyed audience members before the performance, 48 hours afterward, and two weeks afterward, finding a significant decrease in measured autism stigma following the performance.

== Background ==
The musical's early stages date back to early 2018 when Harold Prince announced he was working on a musical adaptation of the film along with composers Jacob Yandura and Rebekah Greer Melocik and playwright Bess Woght. After Prince died in 2019, Sammi Cannold took over as the show's director.

== Production history ==
=== Syracuse (2022) ===
The show made its world premiere at Syracuse Stage on September 21, 2022. The cast featured Wilson Jermaine Heredia as Dr. Emilio Amigo, Desmond Luis Edwards as Remy, Amelia Fei (Yi-Hsuan Fei) as Caroline, Madison Kopec as Marideth, Liam Pearce as Drew, Imani Russell as Mel, Conor Tague as Tommy, Ashley Wool as Jessica, Haven Burton as Terry, Darlesia Cearcy as Johanna, Carlos L. Encinias as Kurt/Rick/Hawkins, Nick Gaswirth as Michael/Derrick, Melina Kalomas as Amy/Shauna, and Marina Pires as Ashley Amigo. The production closed on October 1, 2022 due to illness in the cast.

=== Broadway (2023) ===
In July 2023, it was announced that the show would transfer to Broadway in the autumn of 2023. Most of the Syracuse cast reprised their roles, with the seven autistic actors playing the young adults (Edwards, Fei, Kopec, Pearce, Russell, Tague, and Wool) making their Broadway debuts, and Caesar Samayoa taking over as Dr. Amigo, with Cristina Sastre, Jean Christian Barry, Collin Hancock, Hunter Hollingsworth, Marina Jansen, and Ayanna Nicole Thomas also joining the cast. Previews began on November 15, 2023, and officially opened on December 10, 2023, at the Belasco Theatre, with Paula Abdul and Ludacris joining the producing team led by P3 Productions and entertainment mini-studio Level Forward.

=== Planned United Kingdom production ===
Following a reunion concert, it was announced that the production is scheduled to transfer to the United Kingdom in 2025. A specific location, dates, and casting have yet to be announced.

== Reception ==
The show opened to mixed to positive reviews, with critics praising the representation being showcased with the casting of the seven leads, as well as the performances and script. On January 21, 2024, it was announced the show would close on February 11 after 27 previews and 72 performances.

== Cast and characters ==
Character	Syracuse	Broadway
Character	2022	2023
Dr. Emilio Amigo	Wilson Jermaine Heredia	Caesar Samayoa
Remy	Desmond Luis Edwards	Desmond Luis Edwards
Caroline	Amelia Fei (Yi-Hsuan Fei)	Amelia Fei (Yi-Hsuan Fei)
Marideth	Madison Kopec	Madison Kopec
Drew	Liam Pearce	Liam Pearce
Mel	Imani Russell	Imani Russell
Tommy	Conor Tague	Conor Tague
Jessica	Ashley Wool	Ashley Wool
Terry	Haven Burton	Haven Burton
Johanna	Darlesia Cearcy	Darlesia Cearcy
Kurt/Rick/Hawkins	Carlos L. Encinias	Carlos L. Encinias
Michael/Derrick	Nick Gaswirth	Nick Gaswirth
Amy/Shauna	Melina Kalomas	Melina Kalomas
Ashley Amigo	Marina Pires	Cristina Sastre

=== Notable replacements ===
==== Broadway (2023-2024) ====
- Michael/Derrick: Andrew Kober

== Songs ==
Act I

- "Today Is" - Company
- "Under Control" - Drew, Group
- "The How-To's" - Dr. Amigo, Johanna, Terry, Michael, Kurt, Amy
- "How to Dance in Ohio" - Dr. Amigo, Group
- "Unlikely Animals" - Marideth
- "Butterflies" - Group, Dr. Amigo, Ashley
- "Slow Dancing" - Caroline, Group
- "Hello, How Are You?" - Dr. Amigo, Rick, Shauna, Ashley
- "Come Home, Recover" - Ashley
- "Getting Ready for the Dance" - Johanna, Terry
- "Waves and Wires" - Drew, Company

Act II

- "Drift" - Marideth, Group
- "Terminally Human" - Dr. Amigo
- "So Much in Common" - Group
- "So Much in Common (Reprise)"/"Chevy Silverado"/"Admissions" - Jessica, Tommy, Drew
- "Reincarnation" - Mel, Ashley
- "Two Steps Backwards" - Group
- "Nothing at All" - Remy, Group
- "The Amigo Spring Formal" - Dr. Amigo, Johanna, Terry, Michael, Kurt, Ashley
- "Building Momentum" - Drew
- "The Second Chance Dance" - Company
- "Finale" - Company

Recording

The original Broadway cast album was released to streaming platforms on January 19, 2024. The songs "Under Control", "Getting Ready for the Dance", "So Much in Common", and "Building Momentum" had previously been released as a September 2023 EP.

== See also ==
- The Curious Incident of the Dog in the Night-Time - both the book and the Tony Award-winning play adaptation also about an autistic person
