= Alexandra Shiva =

American film producer and director

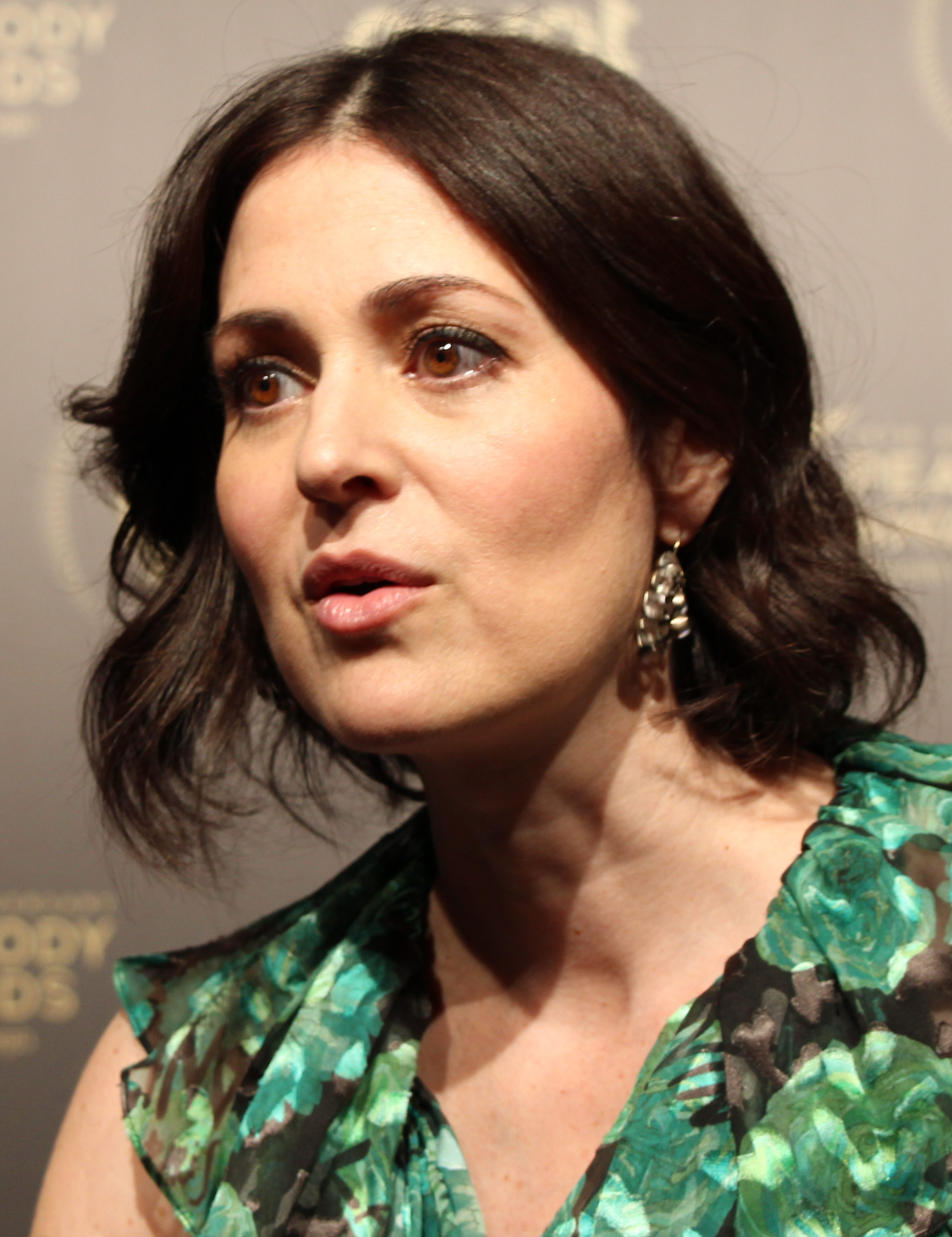
- Alexandra Shiva at the 75 Peabody Awards
- Born: Alexandra Elizabeth Shiva; New York City, New York, U.S.
- Occupation: Film director
- Spouse: Jonathan Marc Sherman
- Children: 2
- Parent(s): Susan Shiva; Gil Shiva
- Relatives: Jules C. Stein (grandfather)

Alexandra Elizabeth Shiva is an American film director. Bombay Eunuch is her 2001 award-winning documentary. Her 2015 documentary, How to Dance in Ohio screened at the Sundance Film Festival in the US Documentary Competition and won a Peabody Award in 2016. It was adapted into a musical of the same name which made its Broadway debut in 2023. Shiva also founded the production studio Gidalya Pictures.

== Personal life ==
Shiva was born in New York City, the daughter of Susan (née Stein) and Gil Shiva. Her grandfather was Jules C. Stein, founder of MCA, the film, television, and record company. She graduated Vassar College in 1995 with her B.A. in Art History. In 2003, Shiva married writer Jonathan Marc Sherman. They have two children.

== Career ==
Shiva's first directed documentary film, Bombay Eunuch (2001), was co-directed with Sean MacDonald and Michelle Gucovsky. The film was released by Shiva's production company Gidalya Pictures. It examined the decline in the traditional status of eunuchs in India focusing on one family. Meena, the leader of the family Shiva follows around, allowed the filmmakers into the private world of hijras in hopes of improving the stigma around hijras. Shiva accomplished gaining access to the private world of hijras, which has traditionally been inaccessible to journalists. Thus allowing for a glimpse of a secretive, invisible world. The New Yorker commended the film for dignifying these outcasts and never condescending them.

In 2006, Shiva directed her second documentary film Stagedoor. The film is about the Stagedoor Manor, a premier summer theatre camp for children ages 8 – 18. The film follows extroverted, budding young actors at Stagedoor Manor, where her husband also attended as a boy.

Shiva continued to explore the theme of people who feel they don't belong but find communities where they do, with her third film How to Dance in Ohio (2015). The documentary takes place in Columbus, Ohio, following the story of three teenage girls with autism preparing to go to the prom. It shows the courage of people facing their fears and entering the adult world. This was Shiva's first film she created after her children were born. She intended to make it in NYC, but her research led her to Ohio where she discovered Emilio Amigo, a psychologist working with autistic children.

The US TV rights for How to Dance in Ohio were acquired by HBO Documentary Films. The film premiered at the 2015 Sundance Film Festival and appeared on HBO later that year. It won a Peabody Award in 2016. Hal Prince announced plans to adapt the film into a musical along with composers Jacob Yandura and Rebekah Greer Melocik and playwright Bess Wohl in 2018. After Prince died in 2019, Sammi Cannold took over as the show's director. The musical premiered at Syracuse Stage on September 21, 2022 and ran until October 9, 2022. In July 2023, it was announced that the musical would transfer to Broadway later that year. Previews began on November 15, 2023, and the show officially opened on December 10, 2023, at the Belasco Theatre, with Paula Abdul and Ludacris joining the producing team led by P3 Productions and entertainment mini-studio Level Forward. On January 21, 2024, it was announced the show would close on February 11 after 27 previews and 72 performances.

In 2018, Shiva directed This is Home: A Refugee Story, an intimate portrait of four Syrian refugee families arriving in America and struggling to find their footing. The film premiered at the 2018 Sundance Film Festival, where it won the World Cinema Documentary Audience Award. It was also awarded the 2019 Alfred I. duPont-Columbia University Award and was acquired by Epix.

For her fifth film, Shiva directed Each and Every Day (2021) for MTV Documentary Films. The documentary is an exploration of youth mental health through the eyes of young people who have attempted suicide or have struggled with suicidal thoughts. It premiered on MTV.

In 2024, Shiva co-directed and produced alongside Lindsey Megrue, One South: Portrait of a Psych Unit revolving around patients and staff at Zucker Hillside Hospital for HBO.

== Filmography ==
=== Director and Producer ===
| Year | Title | Notes | Ref. |
|---|---|---|---|
| 2001 | Bombay Eunuch | codirected with Sean MacDonald and Michelle Gucovsky | |
| 2006 | Stagedoor | | |
| 2015 | How to Dance in Ohio | 2016 Peabody winner | |
| 2018 | This Is Home: A Refugee Story | | |
| 2021 | Each and Every Day | | |
| 2024 | One South: Portrait of a Psych Unit | | |
