= Two Hearts in Waltz Time =

Two Hearts in Waltz Time may refer to:

- Two Hearts in Waltz Time (1930 film), a German film
- Two Hearts in Waltz Time (1934 film), a British musical romance film, with music from the 1930 film
