= Carrie St. Louis =

American musical theater actress

Caroline Brickley St. Louis, known as Carrie St. Louis, is an American actress who has performed in Broadway musicals, including playing Glinda in Wicked.

== Early life ==
St. Louis was born and raised in California. She performed in her first musical when she was seven years old. As a child, she performed at the McCallum Theater with the Onstage Theatre Company; in 2004, she won the Open Call theatre competition in Palm Desert, CA. St. Louis studied voice as a Phillips Academy high school student at Boston University and was an opera major at USC's Thornton School of Music. She graduated from USC in 2012.

== Career ==
Three months after graduating from college, St. Louis was cast as Sherri in the Las Vegas production of Rock of Ages. In 2014, St. Louis made her Broadway debut in Rock of Ages, replacing Kate Rockwell in the role of Sherri. Later that year, St. Louis joined the touring company of Wicked.

In 2016, St. Louis returned to Broadway, transferring from her touring role as Glinda to the starring role in Wicked. During her tenure in the role, St. Louis and Jennifer DiNoia performed "For Good" from Wicked for Michelle Obama at a United Nations event in New York.

In 2017, St. Louis was cast as Annette in the Off-Broadway production of the '90s jukebox musical Cruel Intentions. St. Louis is featured on the original cast recording performing.

St. Louis joined the cast of Kinky Boots in 2018 in the role of Lauren, beginning her tenure with the show alongside Neon Trees lead singer Tyler Glenn. She stayed in the role until the show closed in 2019.

In 2022, St. Louis joined the cast of Titanique as Rose DeWitt Bukater. She performed with the cast in their national television debut on NBC's Late Night with Seth Meyers.

In July 2023, St. Louis starred as Elle Woods in the Kansas City Starlight production of Legally Blonde.

St. Louis was cast in the role of Jenna in the Cape Playhouse production of Waitress in August 2024, but later withdrew from the production.

In May 2025, Dolly Parton announced casting for Dolly: An Original Musical, the musical based on her life, including St. Louis as one of the three actresses who will portray Parton at various stages of her life. The musical premiered in Nashville, Tennessee in July 2025.

In April 2026, St. Louis joined the cast of Just In Time on Broadway as Sandra Dee.

In addition to her performing career, St. Louis leads a vocal studio, providing masterclasses and private lessons to students across the country.
