= St. James Theatre =

Broadway theater in Manhattan, New York

- Erlanger's Theatre
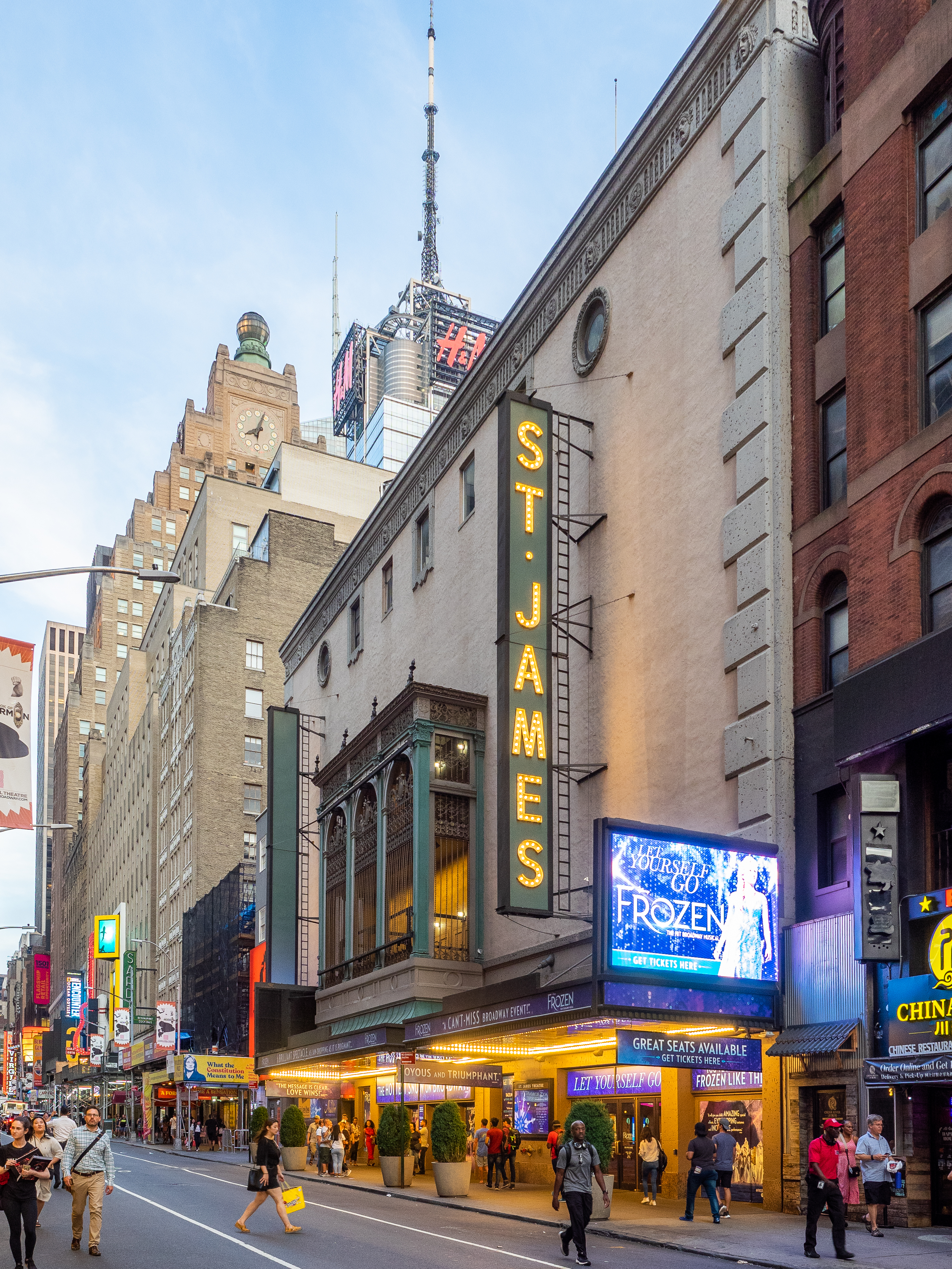
- St. James Theatre in July 2019
- Interactive map of St. James Theatre
- Address: 246 West 44th Street; Manhattan, New York; United States
- Coordinates: 40°45′29″N 73°59′17″W
- Owner: ATG Entertainment
- Capacity: 1,684–1,709 (Note: The capacity is approximate and may vary depending on the show.)
- Type: Broadway

Construction
- Opened: September 26, 1927 (98 years ago)
- Architect: Warren and Wetmore

Website
- us.atgtickets.com/venues/st-james-theatre/

New York City Landmark
- Designated: December 15, 1987
- Reference no.: 1374
- Designated entity: Facade

New York City Landmark
- Designated: December 15, 1987
- Reference no.: 1375
- Designated entity: Auditorium interior

The St. James Theatre, originally Erlanger's Theatre, is a Broadway theater at 246 West 44th Street in the Theater District of Midtown Manhattan in New York City, New York, U.S. Opened in 1927, it was designed by Warren and Wetmore in a neo-Georgian style and was constructed for A. L. Erlanger. It has up to 1,709 seats across three levels and is operated by ATG Entertainment. Both the facade and the auditorium interior are New York City landmarks.

The facade is made largely of stucco, except for the ground story, which is clad in cast stone above a granite water table. The ground story has several recessed openings to the lobby, auditorium, and upper-story offices. Above that are two marquees and a double-story cast-iron loggia, masking the fire escapes from the auditorium. The top story contains windows from the offices there. The auditorium is decorated largely with murals and ornamental plasterwork. The theater has a sloped orchestra level, two balcony levels, and a flat ceiling with a carved sounding board. The first balcony level contains box seats near the front of the auditorium, above which are murals. In addition, there are several lounges and passageways throughout the theater.

Erlanger had proposed a theater on the site as early as 1921, but two proposals failed to materialize. Erlanger's Theatre opened on September 26, 1927, with the musical The Merry Malones. Erlanger died in 1930, and control of the theater was transferred in 1932 to Lodewick Vroom, who renamed it after St James's Theatre in London. The Shubert family acquired the St. James in 1941 but were forced to sell it in 1956 following an antitrust suit. William L. McKnight bought the theater and renovated it in 1958, with Jujamcyn Theaters taking over the venue's operation. The theater was further renovated in 1985, 1999, and 2016. The theater has housed several long-running musicals in its history, including original productions of Oklahoma!, The King and I, Hello, Dolly!, The Who's Tommy, and The Producers. Jujamcyn merged in 2023 with ATG, which continued to operate the theater.

== Site ==
The St. James Theatre is on 246 West 44th Street, on the south sidewalk between Eighth Avenue and Seventh Avenue, near Times Square in the Theater District of Midtown Manhattan in New York City, New York, U.S. The land lot is nearly rectangular, with a protrusion on the eastern end. The lot covers 12,858 square feet (1,194.5 m^{2}), with a frontage of 124.5 feet (37.9 m) on 44th Street and a depth of 100.42 feet (31 m).

The St. James Theatre shares the city block with the Hayes Theater, Sardi's restaurant, and 1501 Broadway to the east, as well as 255 West 43rd Street and 229 West 43rd Street to the south. Across 44th Street are the Row NYC Hotel to the northwest, the Majestic and Broadhurst theaters to the north, and the Shubert Theatre and One Astor Plaza to the northeast. Other nearby structures include the John Golden, Bernard B. Jacobs, Gerald Schoenfeld, and Booth theaters to the north, as well as the former Hotel Carter, Todd Haimes Theatre, and Lyric Theatre to the south. The St. James was developed on the site of several old three-story row houses. There were six residences, each with a brownstone front. The original Sardi's restaurant was one of the buildings that was razed to make way for the St. James.

== Design ==
The St. James Theatre was designed by Warren and Wetmore in the Georgian Revival style, with Beaux-Arts inspirations. It was built for producer Abraham L. Erlanger and opened in 1927 as Erlanger's Theatre. The theater was erected by the Thompson–Starrett Co. The St. James is operated by Jujamcyn Theaters.

=== Facade ===
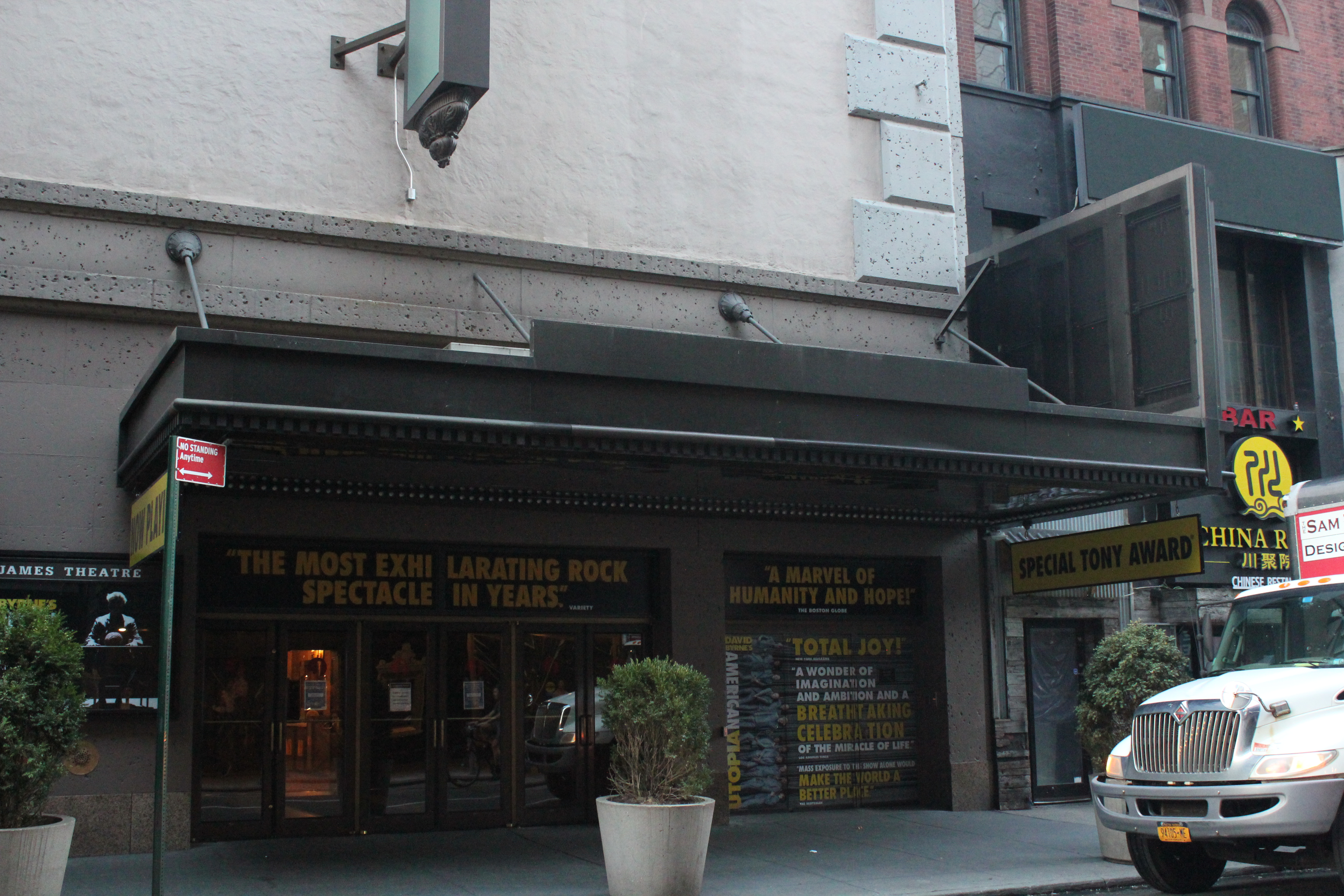
Box office entrance

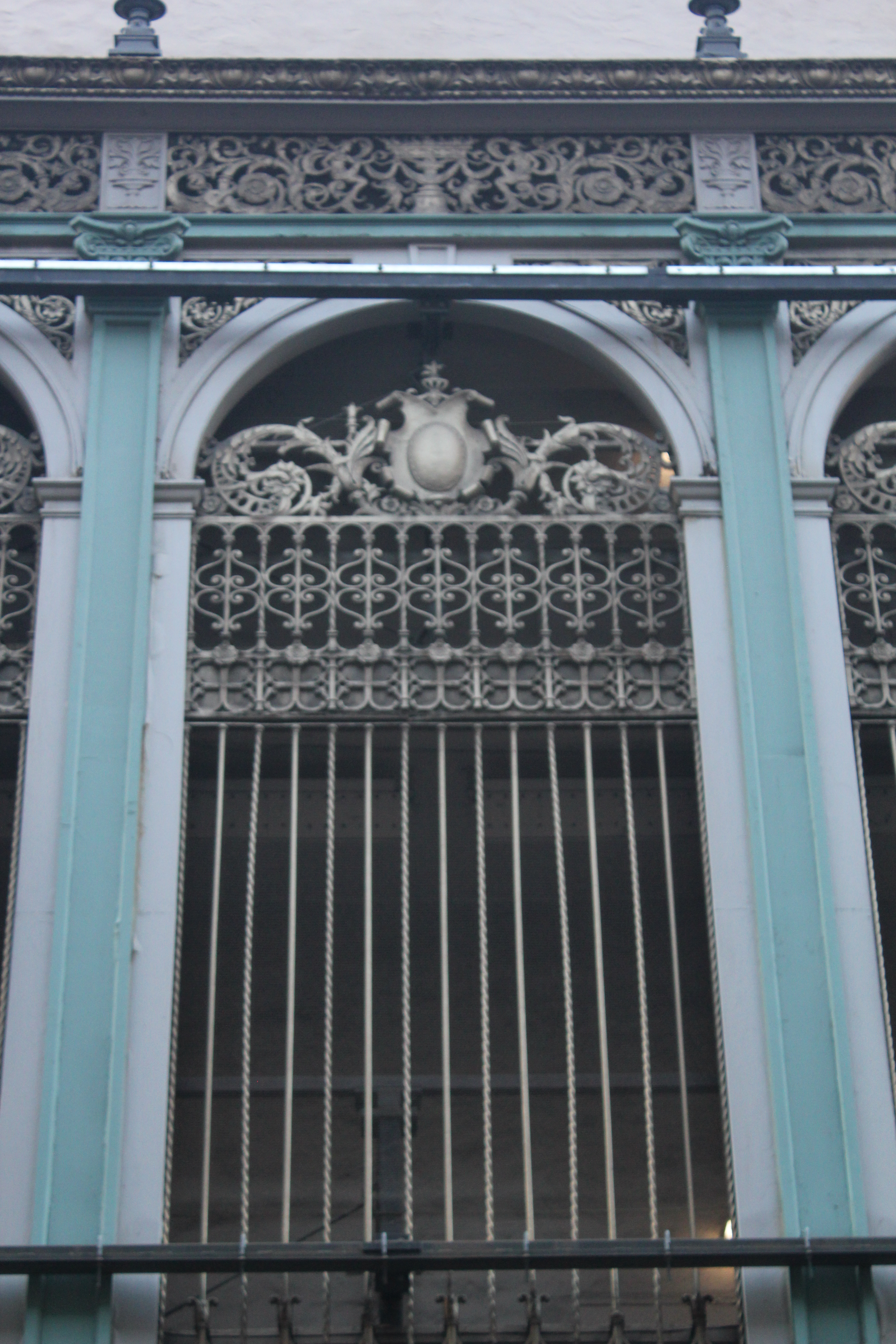
Detail of loggia

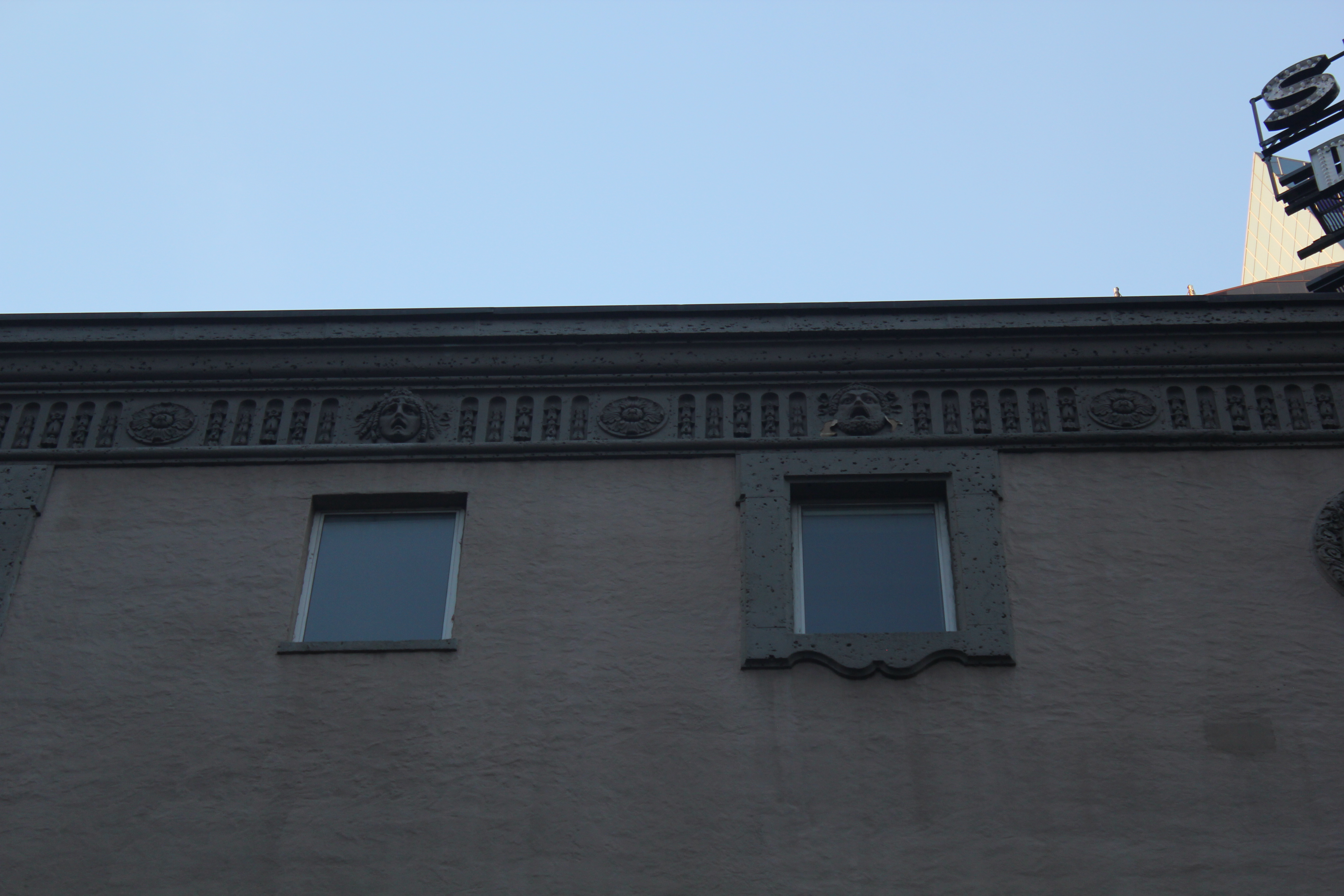
Detail of attic

The facade is symmetrically arranged and is shorter than its width. In general, the facade is plain in design. The facade is made largely of stucco. The ground story is clad in cast stone above a granite water table. Part of the eastern wall is also visible from the street and is clad in stucco over brick. The St. James has a relatively simple facade, in contrast to nearby theaters like the Hayes or Shubert, but similar to the Majestic and Broadhurst. This led The New York Times to call it "probably the least ornate of all the theatres recently added to the Times Square district".

The ground story has numerous recessed doorways. The doorway at the far west (on the right, as viewed from the front) is a metal stage door. The entrance to the box office lobby is immediately adjacent to the stage door. The lobby entrance consists of three aluminum and glass double doors, above which is a transom panel with signs. East of the lobby entrance is a sign board, as well as a service door accessed by two granite steps. The center of the ground-story facade has four metal doors from the auditorium. The eastern section has a glass-and-metal double door to Jujamcyn's upper-story offices, as well as additional service doors. A pair of marquees, with signs facing west and east, is suspended above the western and central sections of the facade. (Note: One marquee is suspended above the lobby doors and stage door, with a sign facing west. The other is suspended above the auditorium doors and service doors, with a sign facing east.) A stone band course runs above the base.

The 44th Street facade has quoins at the extreme west and east ends on the upper stories. The center of the facade has a projecting double-height loggia of wrought iron, which conceals the fire escape. The bottom of the loggia contains stone panels, beneath which is a metal base that curves onto the marquee below it. The loggia has three arches are separated by Ionic-style columns. The arches contain wrought-iron grilles, above which are cartouches flanked by foliate decoration. The spandrels above the arches' corners contain wrought-iron foliate decoration and winged animals. A wrought-iron frieze runs above the loggia, and finials are placed on the loggia's roof. On either side of the loggia are two vertical signs with the letters "St. James", which face west and east. These signs have corbels at their bottoms and lanterns on top. At the time of the theater's construction, one observer said that the blank facade was "most appropriate" for the backdrop of an electric sign.

The attic has five rectangular windows between two circular windows. Three of the rectangular windows have decorative surrounds that are scrolled at the bottom and eared at the top; they alternate with the other two windows, which have no surrounds. The two circular windows contain surrounds with foliate ornament. The attic is topped by a frieze with circular bellflower decorations, vertical niches, and masks depicting comedy and tragedy. Above that is the cornice, which is simple in design. The cornice, frieze, and quoins are also visible on the eastern wall (facing the Hayes Theater).

=== Auditorium ===
The auditorium has an orchestra level, two balconies, boxes, and a stage behind the proscenium arch. The space is designed with plaster decorations in relief, as well as paintings designed to resemble reliefs. Playbill cites the theater as having 1,684 seats, while The Broadway League cites 1,709 seats. Originally, Erlanger's Theatre had 1,600 seats, a comparatively large capacity as the theater was primarily meant to host musicals. The presence of two balconies ran counter to most other theatrical designs of the time, which only had one balcony.

Unlike similar Broadway theaters, the St. James's interior was designed in a simple style without much plasterwork. One contemporary publication described the auditorium as having a "residential rather than theatrical" character. The lack of plasterwork contrasts with the ornate plaster decorations in theaters developed by the Shubert family, as well as those designed by Herbert J. Krapp. Instead, Warren and Wetmore placed emphasis on the interior layout and color scheme. As designed, the theater had coral-colored surfaces with antique gold highlights. The interior design scheme was overseen by John B. Smeraldi. One source described the walls as being "marble and plaster finished in coral lacquer and gold", while the chairs had coral tapestries with gold and blue highlights. After a 1958 renovation, the interior was decorated in charcoal and gold.

==== Seating areas ====
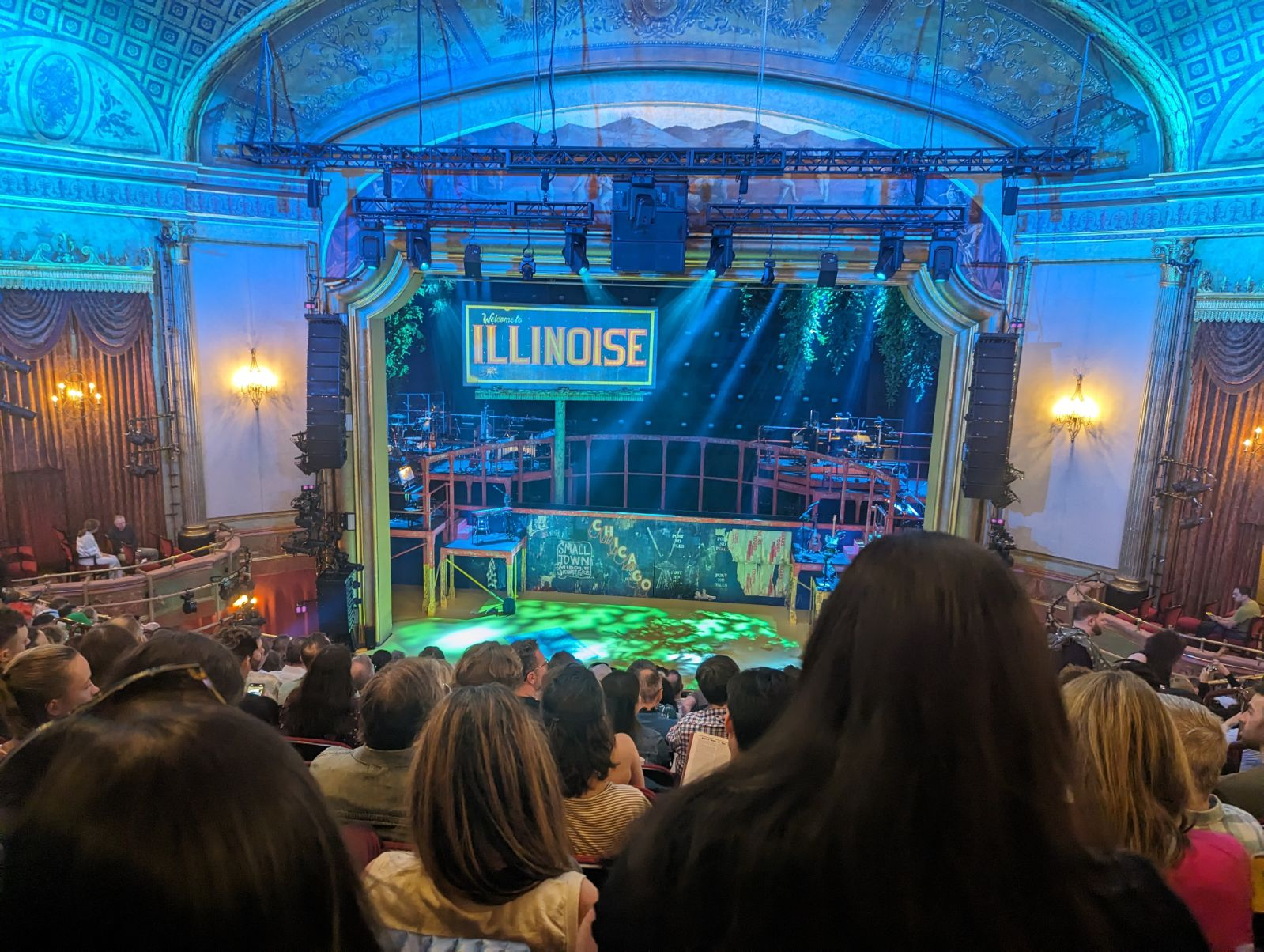
The auditorium seen in 2024 during a production of Illinoise

The orchestra level is wheelchair-accessible via the main doors, and it contains the theater's wheelchair-accessible restrooms. The rear or western end of the orchestra contains a shallow promenade. A stair with ornate metal railings leads up from the orchestra promenade to the balcony level. The orchestra level is raked, sloping down toward an orchestra pit in front of the stage, which can fit 40 people. The orchestra's side walls were originally designed to resemble ashlar blocks. The current configuration of the orchestra level dates to a renovation in 1958, during which the orchestra's rear wall was relocated, enlarging the lobby and shrinking the promenade.

The balcony levels can only be accessed by steps. The first balcony level (also known as the mezzanine) is raked and is divided into front and rear sections by an aisle halfway across its depth. The first balcony is much deeper than in similar theaters, reaching over what originally was the tenth row of orchestra seats. The second balcony is also raked but is recessed. The front of the mezzanine level is curved outward, with molded decorations, and connects with the boxes on either side. An entablature runs near the top of the auditorium, starting from the front of the second balcony level and extending above the boxes and proscenium arch. The undersides of the balcony levels are simple in design and made of plaster. The fronts of both balcony levels have light boxes, and the second balcony also has a technical booth on its rear wall. The side walls were originally designed with murals, which were painted by Paul Arndt and depicted romantic themes. The murals were covered up during subsequent modifications to the theater.

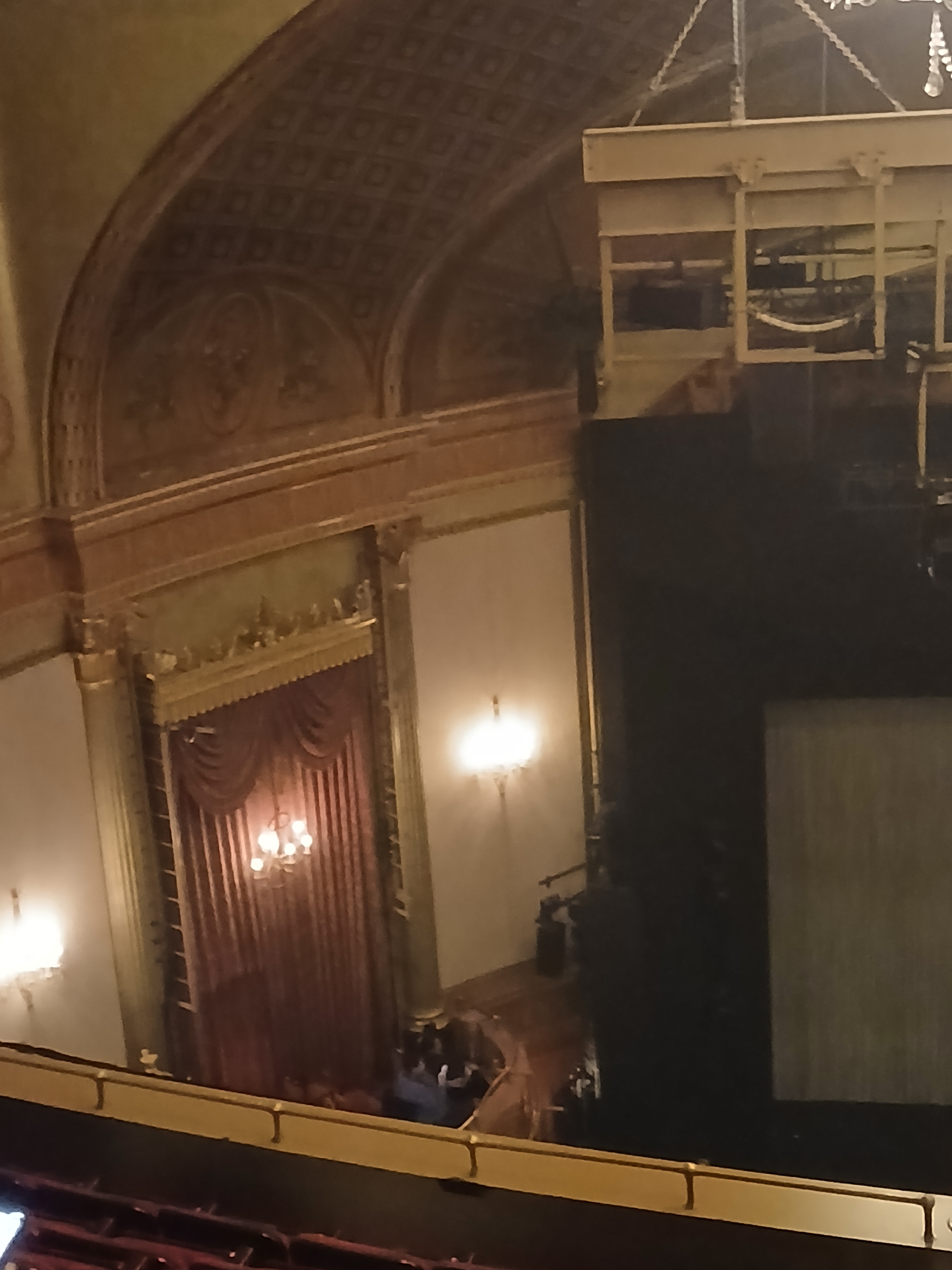
View of the left-hand box

On either side of the proscenium is a curved wall section with one box at the mezzanine level. Originally, one of the boxes was known as the President's box, while the other was called the Governor's box. The fronts of the boxes curve outward and contain plaster moldings. Beside each box are pilasters, which support the entablature above the boxes. There are oval niches on the walls in front of each box, which have busts depicting women. There are also golden urns behind the boxes, next to the mezzanine seating. Draperies were originally hung above the boxes, but they were removed in subsequent renovations. Also above the boxes are lunettes with murals.

==== Other design features ====
Next to the boxes is the proscenium, which contains a flat-arched opening surrounded by an elliptical arch. The top corners of the proscenium opening are concave, protruding slightly inward. The proscenium opening is surrounded by an ovolo molding. A mural is placed above the flat-arched opening, beneath the elliptical arch. It shows cupids playing golf while Satan stands amid a "ruined temple of love". The proscenium's original curtain was made of asbestos and was designed by Smeraldi. On either side of the flat arch, there are depictions of court jesters pulling the curtains open.

A sounding board curves onto the ceiling above the boxes, in front of the proscenium arch. The sounding board contains molded bands of interlocked leaves and ribbons, which divide it into two sections. The front section (nearer the proscenium) is divided into rectangular-paneled sections with urn, leaf, and swag motifs. The rear section (nearer the balconies) rises from the lunettes above each arch, with a panel at the center, which depicts a musical instrument. The rest of the sounding board's rear section is filled with squares containing rosettes. These squares are laid diagonally in a diamond pattern, which is intended to simulate a coffered ceiling. The ceiling itself is flat, curving downward toward the rear of the second balcony. The center of the ceiling has a plasterwork centerpiece, containing motifs of instruments and swags, as well as a hanging chandelier. The centerpiece is surrounded by grilles, which originally served as ventilation openings.

=== Other interior spaces ===
The lobby, to the west of the orchestra promenade, extends across the width of the auditorium. The lobby is divided into outer and inner sections, with the box office in the lobby's outer section. The lobby's inner section originally contained a 17th-century Flemish tapestry on the west wall and a green-and-white marble table, which were the only furnishings in the room. The inner lobby had black-and-white terrazzo marble tiles surrounded by a band of black marble and black-and-white squares. The room also had gray-stone walls with black-and-gold marble decorations, as well as a polychrome-and-gold ceiling with lights. Three black-and-gold marble doorways led to the auditorium. The south portion of the inner lobby had a gray marble staircase with a polychrome-and-gold balustrade and an ebony-wood railing. The lobby was enlarged and modified during a 1958 renovation.

The theater was designed with a ladies' lounge in the basement and a men's lounge on the mezzanine. The ladies' lounge had Adam style decorations and a rose-and-gold color scheme; it included a marble shelf with a mirror, as well as ceiling vents. The mezzanine lounge had a gray-green color scheme and was indirectly lit by lamps hidden behind silk curtains. The lounge was 50 feet (15 m) long and was connected with restrooms, telephone booths, and a writing room via a gray-green corridor. Additionally, a men's club room was placed in the basement and was decorated in a Tudor style, with a large fireplace and plaster walls.

Backstage, the dressing rooms could accommodate 150 cast members; the stars had their own suites with baths. The musicians had their own quarters, which connected to the orchestra pit. Jujamcyn Theaters' corporate offices are also at 246 West 44th Street, the St. James Theatre building.

== History ==
Times Square became the epicenter for large-scale theater productions between 1900 and the Great Depression. At the beginning of the 20th century, Erlanger was a founding member of the Theatrical Syndicate, and he worked with Marc Klaw to run Klaw and Erlanger, the predominant theatrical booking agency in the United States. They developed two major theaters on nearby 42nd Street: the still-extant New Amsterdam Theatre and the no-longer-operational Liberty Theatre. Klaw and Erlanger continued to work together until a dispute in 1919. Soon after the breakup, Erlanger began planning a dozen theaters in the U.S., including three in New York City.

=== Development and early years ===
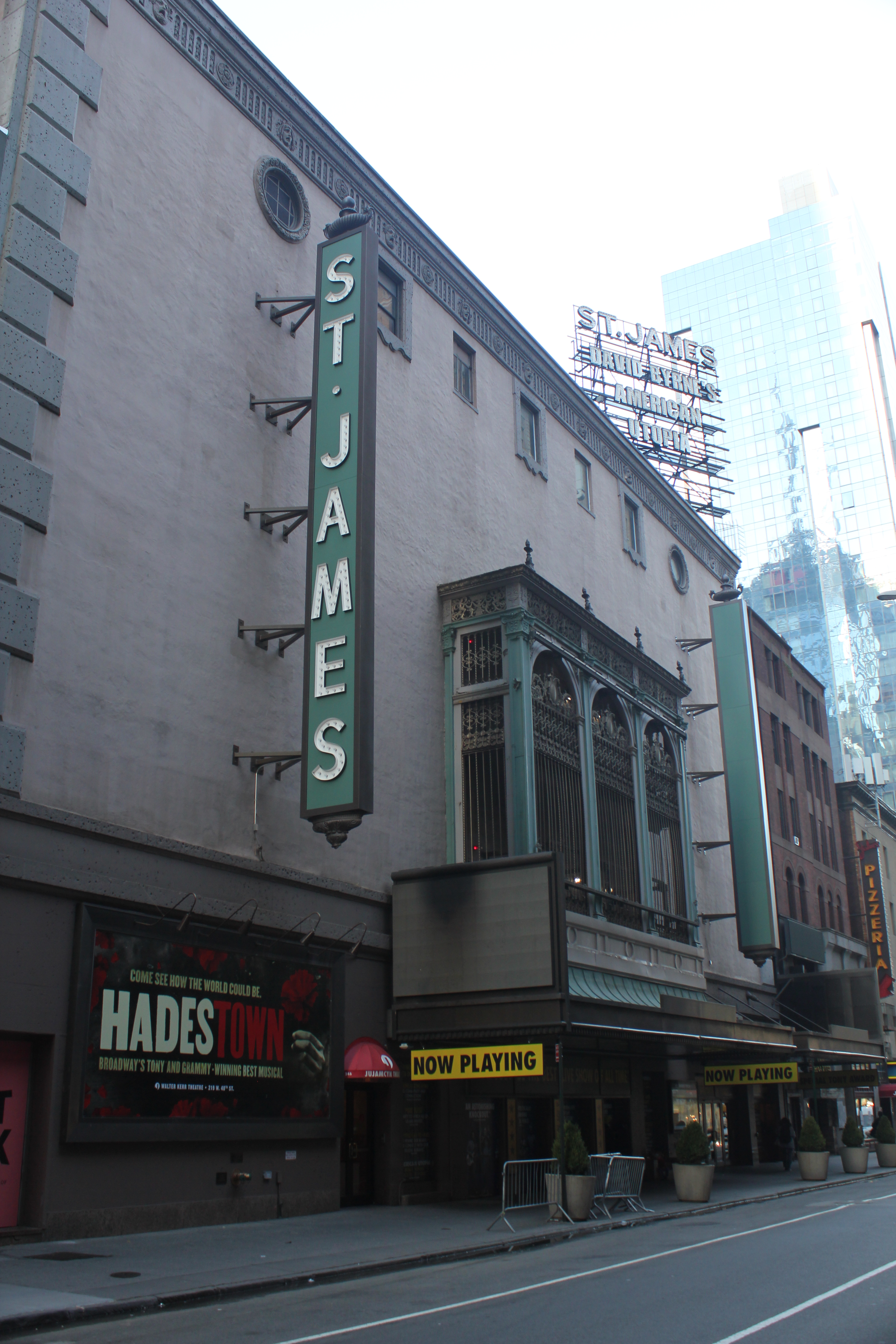
Seen from the east

Erlanger proposed his first new theater in New York City in 1921, when he hired Warren and Wetmore to draw up plans for a 1,200-seat theater on 44th Street, named the Model Theatre. The venue would have been a single-story structure at 246–256 West 46th Street (the current site of the St. James), which would have cost $300,000. The plans were delayed due to Erlanger's disputes with the Shubert brothers, another major theatrical syndicate, and with Klaw. At the time, the Shubert brothers' theaters were generally designed by Herbert J. Krapp, while Klaw's were designed by Eugene De Rosa; both Krapp and De Rosa were experienced theater architects. By contrast, while Warren and Wetmore were well known for designing houses, hotels, and office buildings, as well as collaborating on the design of Grand Central Terminal and the surrounding Terminal City building complex, they had never previously designed a theater. It is unknown why Erlanger hired the firm to design his theater.

The plans were completed in 1922. Erlanger made an agreement that December to instead develop the theater for revues, specifically for vaudeville duo Bernard and Collier; in exchange, the pair would not perform outside New York City. That plan also failed for unknown reasons. Finally, in February 1926, Erlanger announced a third proposal: a two-balcony, 1,600-seat venue named Erlanger's Theatre, which would cost $1 million and be comparable in size to the New Amsterdam Theatre. Warren and Wetmore were still associated with the project.

By May 1927, the theater was reportedly ready for A. L. Erlanger to inspect. That July, Erlanger announced that he had booked George M. Cohan's The Merry Malones as the inaugural production. The theater opened on September 26, 1927, with The Merry Malones, which ultimately ran for 192 performances. Erlanger assumed full control of the theater's operation a month after the venue opened. The run of The Merry Malones was interrupted briefly in early 1928 by a flop entitled The Behavior of Mrs. Crane. Cohan's last musical, Billie, opened in 1928 and had 112 performances. The next year, Lew Fields starred in Hello, Daddy, which had transferred from the Mansfield Theatre. The other runs of 1929 included Murray Anderson's Almanac and Ladies of the Jury.

A. L. Erlanger died in March 1930, and his estate continued to operate the theater. In that year, Erlanger's Theatre hosted a revival of The Rivals, followed by the popular musical Fine and Dandy, the latter of which had 246 performances. In 1931, the Civic Light Opera Company leased the Erlanger for Gilbert and Sullivan productions. The theatrical company occupied the Erlanger for the next year, presenting a variety of operettas from Gilbert and Sullivan and from other writers. After A. L. Erlanger's estate failed to pay rent, ownership of the theater reverted to the Astor family, the owners of the underlying land.

=== Vroom operation ===
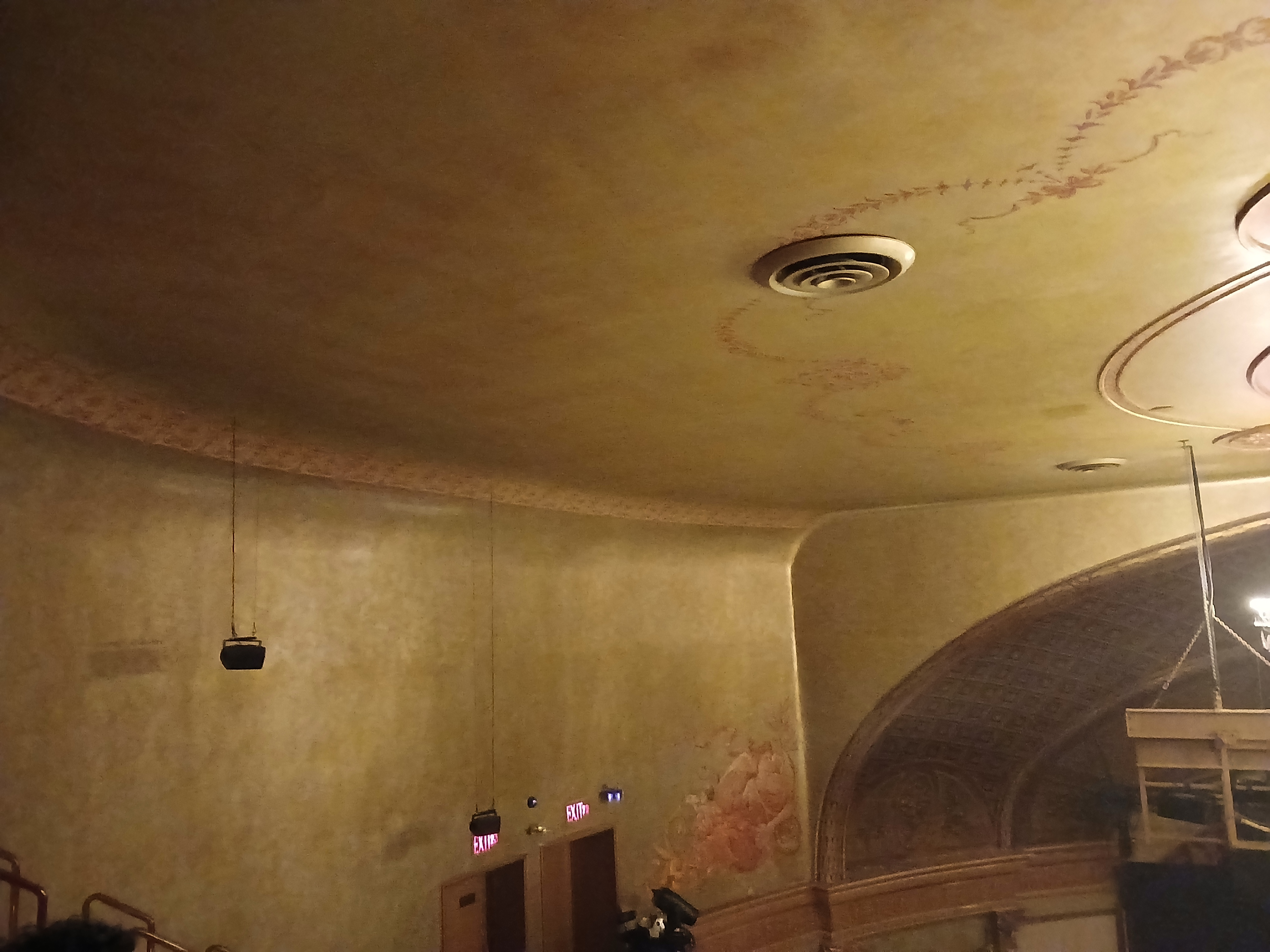
The ceiling and the top of the left wall, which have murals

In July 1932, Gilbert Miller's former manager Lodewick Vroom announced that he had acquired the Erlanger from the Astors. Shortly afterward, Vroom renamed the venue the St. James, after London's St James's Theatre. The revue Walk a Little Faster was the first show at the renamed St. James, opening in December 1932 with Bobby Clark, Paul McCullough, and Bea Lillie; it ran for 121 performances. The St. James hosted another season of Gilbert and Sullivan productions in 1933, also presented by the Civic Light Opera Company. The Ballets Russes de Monte-Carlo opened at the St. James in December 1933, staying through April 1934 (Note: The Ballet Russe had a short gap from January to March 1934.) with performers including Irina Baronova, Léonide Massine, and Tamara Toumanova. This was the Ballets Russes' last performance in the U.S. for fifty years. Clark and McCullough reappeared in the 1935 revue Thumbs Up!, which had 156 performances. Also successful was the operetta May Wine in 1935, which stayed for 212 performances.

The Works Progress Administration (WPA), an agency of the U.S. government, held interviews in the St. James for its Federal Theatre Project during 1936. Next were two Shakespeare revivals in 1937: Hamlet with John Gielgud and Richard II with Maurice Evans. The latter was one of several Shakespeare productions that Margaret Webster directed at the St. James. Later that year, the St. James showed Father Malachy's Miracle for 125 performances. The WPA leased the theater in April 1938 for its production of Trojan Incident, prompting the League of New York Theatres to complain that the government had an undue advantage over private producers. Evans returned that October in an unabridged version of Hamlet, starring Katherine Locke, Mady Christians, and Alexander Scourby; this was the first time that the full text of Hamlet was performed in the U.S. The Hamlet revival ran for 96 performances and was followed in early 1939 by King Henry IV, Part 1 with Evans and Edmond O'Brien, which stayed for 74 performances.

In January 1940, the St. James hosted that year's version of Earl Carroll's Vanities; reviewers criticized the show's short run because it used microphones for amplification. Evans returned that April, reviving the production of Richard II from three years earlier. That November, the St. James hosted another Shakespeare production: Twelfth Night with Evans, Wesley Addy, Helen Hayes, Sophie Stewart, and June Walker. This was followed the next March by Paul Green and Richard Wright's Native Son, which was not as successful as previous shows, with 114 performances.

=== Shubert operation ===
The Shubert Organization started operating the St. James in July 1941 and immediately booked the play Anne of England. From January to March 1942, the St. James hosted the Boston Comic Opera Company and the Jooss Ballet Dance Theatre in repertory. The Boston Opera Company presented Gilbert and Sullivan works, which were performed simultaneously with dance shows such as Kurt Jooss's The Green Table. The same year, the theater hosted a transfer of the long-running play Claudia, as well as the Theatre Guild comedy Without Love with Audrey Christie, Katharine Hepburn, and Elliott Nugent. The Theater Guild, which had seen little success with their shows to date, premiered Rodgers and Hammerstein's first musical, Oklahoma!, at the St. James in March 1943. Vincent Astor sold the theater to the Shuberts later the same year. With over 2,200 performances (Note: Variously cited as 2,248, 2,243, 2,212, or 2,202.) through 1948, Oklahoma! saved the Theatre Guild from bankruptcy and became known as a Rodgers and Hammerstein masterpiece.

Frank Loesser's Where's Charley? opened at the St. James in 1948, ultimately seeing 762 performances over two years. Where's Charley? closed to make way for another musical, Peter Pan, which had been forced to relocate from the Imperial Theatre. This was followed by yet another set of Gilbert and Sullivan shows, this time performed by the D'Oyly Carte Opera Company. Later that year, the St. James premiered the Rodgers and Hammerstein musical The King and I, which ran for 1,246 performances over three years. George Abbott's The Pajama Game was the next show to premiere at the St. James, opening in 1954 and running for 1,061 performances. In 1956, the Johnny Mercer musical Li'l Abner opened, and ran for 693 performances.

=== Jujamcyn and ATG operation ===
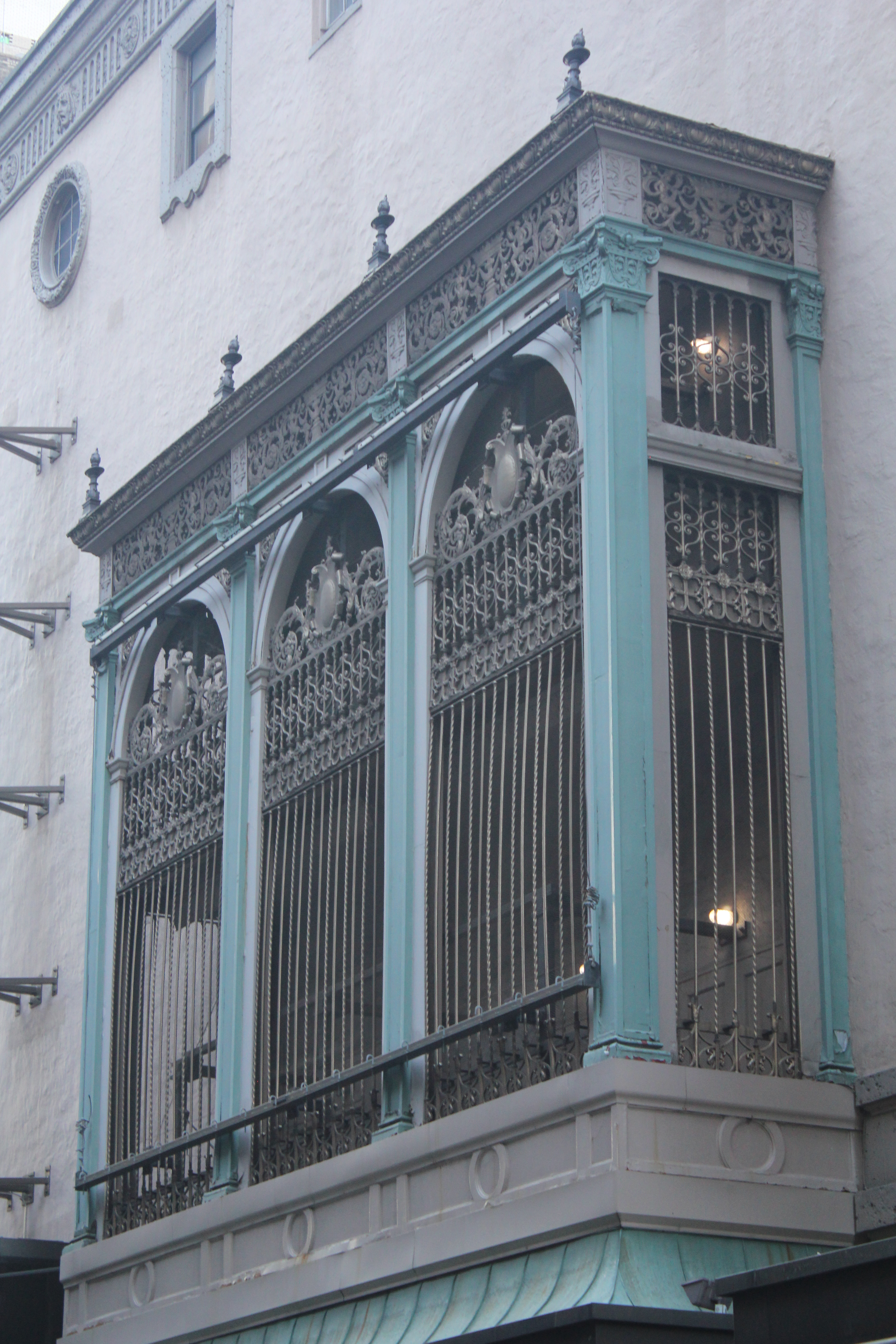
Side view of the loggia

By the 1950s, the Shuberts operated nearly half of all legitimate theaters in New York City, prompting the U.S. federal government to file an antitrust suit against the family. As part of a settlement made in February 1956, the Shuberts had to sell off some of their theaters. If the Shuberts did not sell the St. James within two years, they had to lease out either the St. James or the Imperial. In May 1956, a group headed by businessman Jerome S. Jennings offered the Shuberts $2.1 million for the St. James Theatre. The sale was finalized that July, when Minnesota Mining & Manufacturing president William L. McKnight and theatrical executive Samuel H. Schwartz agreed to buy the St. James for $1.75 million in cash. Schwartz was subsequently appointed president of the Jujamcyn Corporation, an entity formed to operate the theater. Li'l Abner continued to run during this time.

==== 1950s to 1970s ====
McKnight spent $600,000 to restore the St. James during three months in 1958. The interior was extensively modified, while the exterior remained relatively intact. Under designer Frederick Fox, the exterior was painted green and gold, while the interior was decorated in gold and charcoal gray. The curtains, carpets, and seats were replaced; the adjacent alley was converted to a smoking area; and new electronic systems were installed. The first show at the renovated theater was Rodgers and Hammerstein's Flower Drum Song, which opened in December 1958 and ran for 600 performances. The St. James next hosted a transfer of the off-Broadway hit Once Upon a Mattress with Carol Burnett in 1960. This was followed the same year by Jean Anouilh's play Becket, with Laurence Olivier and Anthony Quinn, and the Betty Comden/Adolph Green/Jule Styne musical Do Re Mi, with Nancy Walker and Phil Silvers. Another Comden/Green/Styne musical arrived in 1961: Subways Are for Sleeping, featuring Orson Bean, Sydney Chaplin, Carol Lawrence, and Phyllis Newman.

Further modifications to the St. James were made in 1962. The same year, the theater hosted the musical Mr. President, which was Irving Berlin's last Broadway show and was not popularly received. The next production at the St. James was John Osborne's Luther, which opened in 1963 and featured Albert Finney. The Jerry Herman and Michael Stewart musical Hello, Dolly! opened at the St. James in January 1964, originally featuring Carol Channing and David Burns. With 2,844 performances through 1970, Hello, Dolly! was the longest-running Broadway musical when it closed. This was followed in 1971 by Galt MacDermot and John Guare's version of Shakespeare's Two Gentlemen of Verona, featuring Raul Julia, Clifton Davis, and Jonelle Allen for 613 performances.

For much of the mid-1970s, the St. James hosted short-lived revivals. For instance, a 1973 revival of A Streetcar Named Desire, with Alan Feinstein and Lois Nettleton, ended after only 53 performances. An even shorter show was the 1974 revival of the musical Good News, with Alice Faye and Gene Nelson, which ran 16 times. This was followed in 1975 by the revival of The Misanthrope with Alec McCowen and Diana Rigg, which had 94 performances, as well as the musical revue A Musical Jubilee, which had 92 performances. In 1976, McKnight transferred the St. James and Jujamcyn's other venues to his daughter Virginia and her husband James H. Binger. The same year, the theater hosted a revival of My Fair Lady, which relocated at the end of 1976 to make way for George Abbott's musical Music Is. The next hit was Comden and Green's musical On the Twentieth Century, which opened in 1978 and had over 450 performances. Four short runs followed in 1979 and 1980: Carmelina, Broadway Opry '79, The 1940's Radio Hour, and Filumena.

==== 1980s and 1990s ====
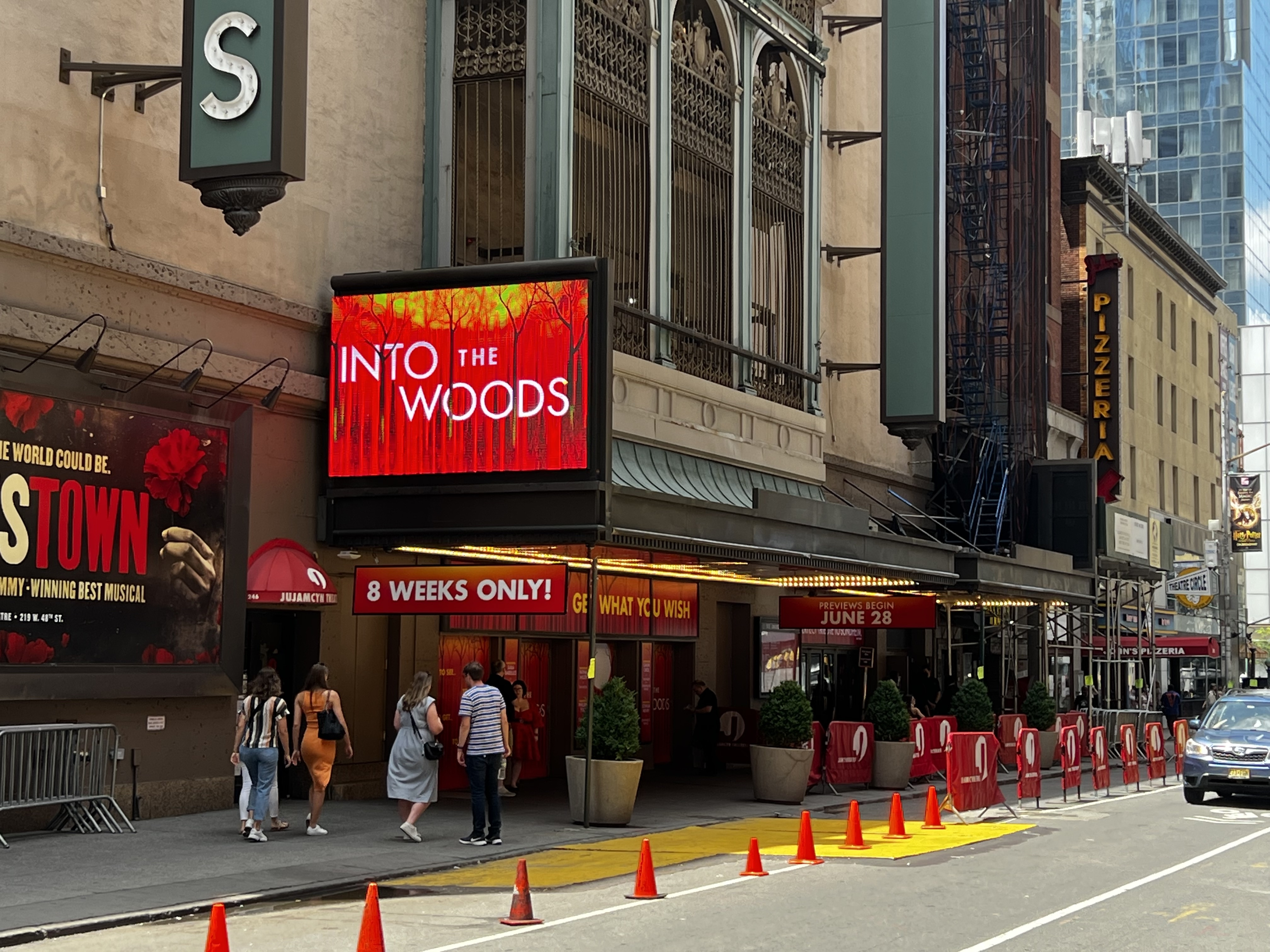
Marquee

The musical Barnum premiered in 1980, starring Jim Dale with music by Michael Stewart, Cy Coleman, and Mark Bramble; it had 854 performances over the next two years. The next show was the 1982 revue Rock 'N Roll! The First 5,000 Years, which flopped after a week. Following this was another long run, the musical My One and Only, which opened in 1983 and ran for 767 performances. The stage floor and traps were replaced after My One and Only's run ended. In July 1985, Jujamcyn announced a $1.5 million renovation for the theater. The changes, executed by Total Concept, included a new marquee, seats, draperies, and carpets, as well as a repainted auditorium and new electrical wiring. Due to the relatively small budget and the project's eighteen-week schedule, the lighting was not changed; additionally, some of the original details could not be restored. The theater reopened in December 1985 with the revue Jerry's Girls, which lasted four months. Afterward, the long-running musical 42nd Street transferred from the Majestic in 1987, extending its run for two years. The St. James's last shows of the decade were Bill Irwin's play Largely New York and a revival of the musical Gypsy with Tyne Daly in 1989. The latter ran for more than a year.

The New York City Landmarks Preservation Commission (LPC) had started to consider protecting the St. James as a landmark in 1982, with discussions continuing over the next several years. The LPC designated the St. James's facade and interior as a landmark on December 15, 1987. This was part of the commission's wide-ranging effort in 1987 to grant landmark status to Broadway theaters. The New York City Board of Estimate ratified the designations in March 1988. Jujamcyn, the Nederlanders, and the Shuberts collectively sued the LPC in June 1988 to overturn the landmark designations of 22 theaters, including the St. James, on the merit that the designations severely limited the extent to which the theaters could be modified. The lawsuit was escalated to the New York Supreme Court and the Supreme Court of the United States, but these designations were ultimately upheld in 1992.

The musical The Secret Garden, starring Daisy Eagan and Mandy Patinkin, opened in 1991 and ran for 706 performances over two years. This was followed in 1993 by The Who's Tommy, which also ran for two years, accumulating 900 performances. The next production was supposed to be the musical Busker Alley in 1995, for which LeRoy Neiman painted a 40-foot-tall (12 m) mural on the theater's facade. The musical's Broadway run was canceled after its star Tommy Tune broke his foot, and the mural was painted over. The Stephen Sondheim musical A Funny Thing Happened on the Way to the Forum was revived in 1996 and ultimately ran for 715 performances. This was followed by a limited engagement by singer Patti LaBelle in January 1998, as well as a 98-performance run of the musical High Society the same year. The St. James underwent a $3 million, eight-month renovation, conducted by EverGreene Architectural Arts. When the theater reopened in 1999, it hosted a short run of the musical The Civil War and a year-long run of the dance revue Swing!.

==== 2000s and 2010s ====
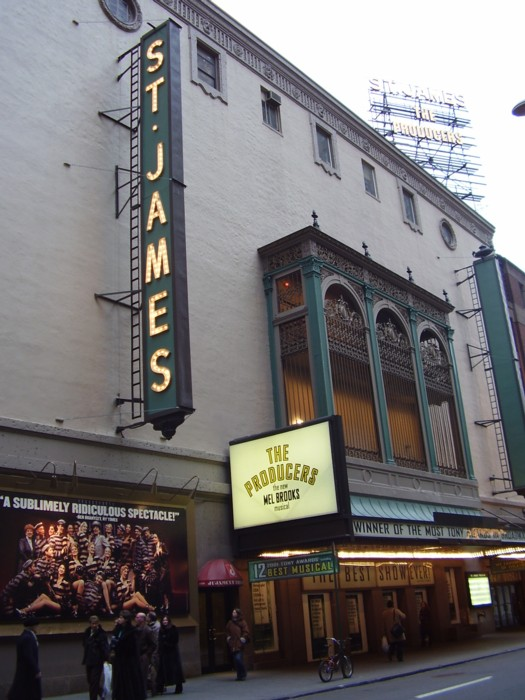
Seen in 2006, during the run of The Producers

Swing! closed in January 2001 and was replaced by Mel Brooks's musical The Producers, which broke a ticket-sale record when it opened in April 2001. Due to high demand, The Producers' producers started reserving premium seat tickets at the theatre in a will call system to prevent scalping, the first time any Broadway show had done this. Prior to the implementation of this policy, brokers would buy tickets for $100 and resell them for as much as $742.50; though such markups were illegal in New York state, the tickets were sold on websites that were based in other states. After Binger died in 2004, Rocco Landesman bought the St. James and Jujamcyn's four other theaters in 2005, along with the air rights above them. Jordan Roth joined Jujamcyn as a resident producer the same year. The Producers ultimately lasted until 2007, with 2,502 performances. It was followed the same year by a limited run of Dr. Seuss' How the Grinch Stole Christmas!, which opened one day before the start of the 2007 Broadway stagehand strike; a New York Supreme Court judge ruled that forced to keep operating during the strike. The St. James then hosted a revival of Gypsy in 2008, featuring Patti LuPone, Laura Benanti, and Boyd Gaines.

In 2009, Roth acquired a 50 percent stake in Jujamcyn and assumed full operation of the firm when Landesman joined the National Endowments of the Arts. The same year, the St. James staged the Goodman Theatre's revival of Desire Under the Elms and the City Center Encores production of Finian's Rainbow. In the early 2010s, the St. James hosted musicals along with limited-engagement concerts. These included American Idiot in 2010; Hair and On a Clear Day You Can See Forever in 2011; Leap of Faith and Bring It On: The Musical in 2012; Barry Manilow's concert and Let It Be in 2013; and Bullets Over Broadway and Side Show in 2014. Part of the stage-left portion of the theater was demolished to accommodate the set for Bullets Over Broadway.

Something Rotten! opened in 2015 and ran for a year and a half. A revival of the play Present Laughter was then hosted in 2017. After Second Stage Theater bought the adjacent Hayes Theater in 2016, Roth approached Second Stage about the possibility of simultaneously renovating both theaters. Second Stage sold the alley between the theaters to Jujamcyn, which extended the St. James's stage 10 feet (3.0 m) eastward into the alley. The stage expansion was completed for the Disney musical Frozen, which opened in March 2018. Frozen achieved the box office record for the St. James Theatre, grossing $2,624,495 over eight performances for the week ending December 30, 2018.

==== 2020s to present ====
All Broadway theaters temporarily closed on March 12, 2020, due to the COVID-19 pandemic, and Frozen was canceled as a result. The St. James was the first Broadway house to reopen after the pandemic-related closure, with a limited run of Bruce Springsteen's Springsteen on Broadway shows opening on June 26, 2021. As part of a settlement with the United States Department of Justice in 2021, Jujamcyn agreed to improve disabled access at its five Broadway theaters, including the St. James. David Byrne's American Utopia opened later the same year and ran until early 2022. This was followed in July 2022 by a limited run of the musical Into the Woods, which was extended through January 2023. Jujamcyn and Ambassador Theatre Group (ATG) agreed to merge in early 2023; the combined company would operate seven Broadway theaters, including the St. James. In July 2023, Jordan Roth sold a 93 percent stake in Jujamcyn's five theaters, including the St. James Theatre, to ATG and Providence Equity.

New York, New York, Kander and Ebb's musical adaptation of the film New York, New York, opened at the theater in April 2023 and ran for three months. A revival of Spamalot, transferring from the Kennedy Center, opened at the theater in November 2023 and closed after 164 performances. The musical Illinoise was staged at the theater from April to August 2024. This was followed in October 2024 by the transfer of the 2023 West End revival of Sunset Boulevard, which concluded its run in July 2025. During the run of Sunset Boulevard, the St. James hosted a memorial service for actor Gavin Creel on December 2, 2024, and a single performance of Trisha Paytas' Big Broadway Dream on February 3, 2025. The Queen of Versailles opened at the St. James in November 2025 and closed in December 2025. This was followed by the transfer of the Off-Broadway and West End musical Titanique, which opened in April 2026 for a limited run; it closed in September of that year. It is planned to be followed by Dolly: A True Original Musical in 2027.

== Notable productions ==
Productions are listed based on the year of their first performance.

=== 1920s to 1990s ===
Notable productions at the theater
| Opening year | Name | Refs. |
|---|---|---|
| 1928 | She Stoops to Conquer | |
| 1928 | Diplomacy | |
| 1928 | Billie | |
| 1930 | The Rivals | |
| 1930 | Fine and Dandy | |
| 1931 | Gilbert and Sullivan Series (eight unique productions) | (Note: The following plays appeared at least once: The Mikado, H.M.S. Pinafore, Iolanthe, The Gondoliers, Patience, The Pirates of Penzance, Trial by Jury, and Ruddigore. Several Gilbert and Sullivan plays had multiple discontinuous runs in 1931, and H.M.S. Pinafore was performed both by itself and with Trial by Jury.) |
| 1931 | The Merry Widow | |
| 1931 | The Chocolate Soldier | |
| 1931 | The Geisha | |
| 1931 | The Chimes of Normandy | |
| 1931 | Naughty Marietta | |
| 1931 | The Firefly | |
| 1932 | The Gondoliers | |
| 1932 | Robin Hood | |
| 1932 | Walk a Little Faster | |
| 1933 | Gilbert and Sullivan Series (five productions) | (Note: The Mikado, The Yeomen of the Guard, H.M.S. Pinafore/Trial by Jury, Patience) |
| 1933 | Ballet Russe de Monte-Carlo | |
| 1934 | The Chocolate Soldier | |
| 1934 | Thumbs Up! | |
| 1935 | May Wine | |
| 1936 | Love from a Stranger | |
| 1937 | Richard II | (Note: This specific production of Richard II was revived in 1940.) |
| 1937 | Father Malachy's Miracle | |
| 1938 | Hamlet | |
| 1939 | King Henry IV, Part 1 | |
| 1940 | Earl Carroll's Vanities (1940) | |
| 1940 | Twelfth Night | |
| 1941 | Native Son | |
| 1941 | Pal Joey | |
| 1942 | Gilbert and Sullivan Series (ten productions) | (Note: H.M.S. Pinafore/The Green Table, The Mikado/The Big City/A Ball in Old Vienna, The Pirates of Penzance/The Prodigal Sun, Iolanthe, Trial by Jury, The Gondoliers) |
| 1942 | Claudia | |
| 1942 | Without Love | |
| 1943 | Oklahoma! | |
| 1948 | Where's Charley? | |
| 1950 | Peter Pan | |
| 1951 | Gilbert and Sullivan Series (six productions) | (Note: The Mikado, Trial by Jury/H.M.S. Pinafore, The Gondoliers, Iolanthe, Cox and Box) |
| 1951 | The King and I | |
| 1954 | The Pajama Game | |
| 1956 | Li'l Abner | |
| 1958 | Flower Drum Song | |
| 1960 | Once Upon a Mattress | |
| 1960 | Becket | |
| 1960 | Do Re Mi | |
| 1961 | Subways Are for Sleeping | |
| 1962 | Mr. President | |
| 1963 | Luther | |
| 1964 | Hello, Dolly! | |
| 1970 | 1776 | |
| 1971 | Two Gentlemen of Verona | |
| 1973 | A Streetcar Named Desire | |
| 1974 | Good News | |
| 1975 | The Misanthrope | |
| 1976 | My Fair Lady | |
| 1976 | Music Is | |
| 1977 | Vieux Carré | |
| 1978 | On the Twentieth Century | |
| 1979 | Carmelina | |
| 1979 | The 1940's Radio Hour | |
| 1980 | Filumena | |
| 1980 | Barnum | |
| 1982 | Rock 'N Roll! The First 5,000 Years | |
| 1983 | My One and Only | |
| 1985 | Jerry's Girls | |
| 1987 | 42nd Street | |
| 1989 | Gypsy | |
| 1991 | The Secret Garden | |
| 1993 | The Who's Tommy | |
| 1996 | A Funny Thing Happened on the Way to the Forum | |
| 1998 | Patti LaBelle on Broadway | |
| 1998 | High Society | |
| 1999 | The Civil War | |
| 1999 | Swing! | |

=== 2000s to present ===
Notable productions at the theater
| Opening year | Name | Refs. |
|---|---|---|
| 2001 | The Producers | |
| 2007 | Dr. Seuss' How the Grinch Stole Christmas! | |
| 2008 | Gypsy | |
| 2009 | Desire Under the Elms | |
| 2009 | Finian's Rainbow | |
| 2010 | American Idiot | |
| 2011 | Hair | |
| 2011 | On a Clear Day You Can See Forever | |
| 2012 | Leap of Faith | |
| 2012 | Bring It On: The Musical | |
| 2013 | Barry Manilow – "Manilow on Broadway: Live at the St. James" | |
| 2013 | Let It Be | |
| 2014 | Bullets Over Broadway | |
| 2014 | Side Show | |
| 2015 | Something Rotten! | |
| 2017 | Present Laughter | |
| 2018 | Frozen | |
| 2021 | Springsteen on Broadway | |
| 2021 | David Byrne's American Utopia | |
| 2022 | Into the Woods | |
| 2023 | New York, New York | |
| 2023 | Spamalot | |
| 2024 | Illinoise | |
| 2024 | Sunset Boulevard | |
| 2025 | Trisha Paytas' Big Broadway Dream | |
| 2025 | The Queen of Versailles | |
| 2026 | Titanique | |
| 2027 | Dolly: A True Original Musical | |

== Box-office record ==
As of 2025, Sunset Boulevard holds the box office record for the St. James Theatre. The production grossed $2,481,018 over eight performances for the week ending July 20, 2025. The productions also holds the theater's single-day box office record, grossing $514,515 over a single performance on July 20, 2025.

== See also ==
- List of Broadway theaters
- List of New York City Designated Landmarks in Manhattan from 14th to 59th Streets
