= Nancy McCord =

American soprano and actress (?–1974)

Nancy McCord (died July 8, 1974, Arcadia, California) was an American soprano and actress who had an active career in opera, musical theatre, and vaudeville during the 1920s, 1930s and early 1940s. She appeared in operettas and musicals on Broadway and in operas with several American companies, including the St. Louis Municipal Opera and the Metropolitan Opera. Her repertoire consisted mainly of roles from light opera and operettas. She is best remembered for creating the roles of Marie-Baroness von Schlewitz in the original production of Oscar Hammerstein II and Sigmund Romberg's May Wine (1935); and Mary Stone in the world premiere of Douglas Moore's The Devil and Daniel Webster (1939). She also performed leading roles in the United States premieres of two operettas: Franz Lehár's The Land of Smiles (1933, Boston) and Robert Stolz's Venus in Seide (1935, Saint Louis).

== Career ==
A native of Long Island, New York, McCord studied singing with Marcella Sembrich at the Juilliard School and at her studio in Bolton Landing, New York on Lake George. She began her career as a radio singer in the early 1920s as a regular performer on NBC Radio's WEAF station in New York City. In 1929 she made her New York opera debut performing the role of Micaëla in Georges Bizet's Carmen at Lewisohn Stadium with Vladimir Rosing's American Opera Company (AOC) and conductor Eugene Ormandy. She gave her first performance on Broadway on January 10, 1930, as Susanna in Mozart's The Marriage of Figaro for the AOC at the Casino Theatre. This was soon followed by the role of Marguerite in Charles Gounod's Faust on January 18, 1930, opposite tenor Charles Kullman in the title role; notably the last performance given at the Casino Theatre before it was demolished the following month. She then toured with the AOC to Washington D.C., performing the same three opera roles at Poli's Theatre. Also in 1930, she starred as Marie Madame Morrosini in the Walter Kollo's operettaThree Little Girls (German: Drei arme kleine Mädels) at the Great Northern Theatre in Chicago. In 1933 she portrayed Lisa in the United States premiere of Franz Lehár's The Land of Smiles at the Boston Opera House.

In addition to appearing in operas, McCord toured periodically in vaudeville in the early to mid 1930s with a 1932 review in Variety describing her as a "looker with a voice". In 1934 she was a headliner on the Orpheum Circuit; appearing in venues like Chicago's Cadillac Palace Theatre. In 1932 she appeared at the Ambassador Theatre on Broadway as Mable Stork in the musical revue Chamberlain Brown's Scrap Book which was produced by the show's namesake. She appeared in several more Broadway musicals in the 1930s, including the role of Kit Baker in the 1933 revival of Irving Berlin's Face the Music; a role which she was originally scheduled to perform in the musical's initial run a year earlier. Having secured the role in the revival, critic Mehler wrote in his review of her performance as Kit, "How come Nancy McCord, the ingenue in the show, was let go from the original production is beyond us. Here she does much better than her successor in the first presentation. She has a distinctive personality and is nice to look at."

McCord appeared in several more Broadway productions in the 1930s; starring as Queen Erna of Langenstein in the original production of Frederick Herendeen and Edward A. Horan's All the King's Horses (1934); and Marie-Baroness von Schlewitz in the original cast of Oscar Hammerstein II and Sigmund Romberg's May Wine (1935). Her final Broadway performance was as Mary Stone in the world premiere of Douglas Moore's The Devil and Daniel Webster at the Martin Beck Theatre on Broadway. She repeated this role for several performances at the 1939 New York World's Fair after it left that theatre.

On the opera stage, McCord starred in many productions with the St. Louis Municipal Opera (SLMO) beginning with the 1931 summer season. In 1933 she starred in the SLMO's productions of Noël Coward's operetta Bitter Sweet, the Edwardian musical comedy Florodora (as Dolores), and created the role of Marianne in the world premiere of Harry Tierney's operetta Beau Brummell. She later returned to the SLMO in 1935 to portray Shirley Sheridan in Jerome Kern and Otto Harbach's The Cat and the Fiddle and Princess Stephanya in the United States premiere of Robert Stolz's operetta Venus in Seide (retitled Venus in Silk for American billing). The latter work toured to Pittsburgh for tryout performances prior to a planned Broadway run; but poor reviews of the production prevented those plans from moving forward. In 1938 she performed the role of Heidi Mahler in the SLMO's staging of Lost Waltz; a stage adaptation the 1934 musical film Two Hearts in Waltz Time. Some of the other roles she sang with the SLMO included the title roles in Rudolf Friml's Rose-Marie (1939) and Friml's Katinka (1939)

McCord made her debut at the Metropolitan Opera as the romantic lead Saamcheddine in Henri Rabaud's Mârouf, savetier du Caire on May 21, 1937, with Mario Chamlee in the title role. That same year she was featured performing works by Gilbert and Sullivan in a 1937 NBC Radio broadcast on the program Sealtest's Saturday Night Party. In 1941 she starred in The Student Prince in a production mounted by The Shubert Organization at the Boston Opera House, and then toured with that production to other theatres owned by the Shubert family. That same year she portrayed the title role in Rio Rita at the Dallas Opera.

== Later life ==
McCord retired from performance after her marriage to Edmond C. Fleming in 1942. Immediately following their marriage, the couple settled on Fleming's ranch in Altadena, California. In 1954 she relocated to Arcadia, California where she resided until her death 20 years later on July 8, 1974.
