= Caesar Samayoa =

American stage actor

Caesar Samayoa is an American stage actor.

== Early life and education ==
Samayoa's parents immigrated to the United States from Guatemala. He grew up in Spanish Harlem, and attended school in Emerson, New Jersey. He became interested in theater after seeing Anna Deavere Smith perform in Twilight: Los Angeles, 1992.

After first attending Bucknell University, Samayoa transferred to Ithaca College, where he graduated with a degree in drama.

== Career ==
Samayoa's first theater role in New York City was in 1997 in Joe Calarco’s Shakespeare's R&J, where he played Juliet, Benvolio, and Montague.

When Samayoa was first offered the opportunity to join Come From Away, he was skeptical, having heard it pitched as a "9/11 musical". In addition to the event's influence on American society, Samayoa had been in New York City on the day of the attacks. However, he changed his mind after reading the show's script at the request of his agent. Samayoa began performing as part of Come from Away's cast in 2015, and originated the roles of Kevin J. and Ali in the 2017 Broadway production. He remained with the show until 2022.

In 2023, Samayoa originated the role of Dr. Amigo in the Broadway production of How to Dance in Ohio.

In 2025, Samayoa originated the role of Don Kirshner and others in the Broadway production of the Bobby Darin bio-musical Just in Time.

== Roles ==
Year	Show	Role	Notes	Ref
1997	Shakespeare's R&J	Juliet, Benvolio, Montague	Off-Broadway	
2002`	Call the Children Home		Regional	
2006	Hot Feet	Understudy (Louie)		
2007	The Attic			
2010	The Pee-wee Herman Show	Understudy (Bear, Cowboy Curtis, King of Cartoons, Sergio, Voices)		
2011	Sister Act	Pablo		
2013	Love's Labour's Lost	Don Armando	Shakespeare in the Park	
2015	Come from Away	Kevin J./Ali and others	Regional	
2017	Come from Away	Kevin J./Ali and others	Broadway	
2022	Los Otros	Carlos	Off-Broadway	
2023	Evita	Juan Perón	Regional	
2023	How to Dance in Ohio	Dr. Emilio Amigo	Broadway	
2024	Seared	Harry	Regional	
2025	Just in Time	Don Kirshner and others	Broadway	

== Awards ==
Year	Award	Category	Result	Ref
2022	Hispanic Organization of Latin Actors Awards	HOLA José Ferrer Tespis Award	Won	

== Personal life ==
Samayoa, who is gay, married talent agent Christopher Freer in June 2022. Outside of theater, he enjoys cooking.
