= How to Dance in Ohio =

- Directed by: Alexandra Shiva
- Produced by: Bari Pearlman; Alexandra Shiva
- Cinematography: Laela Kilbourn
- Edited by: Toby Shimin
- Music by: Bryan Senti
- Production companies: Gidalya Pictures; Blumhouse Productions
- Distributed by: HBO Documentary Films
- Release dates: January 25, 2015 (Sundance Film Festival); October 26, 2015 (United States)
- Running time: 89 minutes
- Country: United States
- Language: English

How to Dance in Ohio is a 2015 American documentary film directed by Alexandra Shiva. The film follows a group of autistic young adults in Columbus, Ohio preparing for their first spring formal. With guidance from their group counselor, Dr. Emilio Amigo, the group spends 12 weeks practicing their social skills in preparation for the dance. HBO Documentary Films acquired television rights to the film eleven days before its world premiere at the 2015 Sundance Film Festival. The film premiered on HBO on October 26, 2015. Three young women are the main subjects of the documentary.

Shiva said of the film: "The dance is sweet and the dance is lovely, but the biggest challenge is how do we show you as a viewer that for Marideth to just say 'Hi,' that's an accomplishment?"

== Main participants ==
=== Marideth ===
Marideth Bridges is a 16-year-old who spends most of her time at home on her computer learning facts.

=== Jessica ===
Jessica Sullivan is a 22-year-old living at home with her parents. She works at a bakery with an autistic workforce. Her best friend is Caroline.

=== Caroline ===
Caroline McKenzie is a 19-year-old college student. She has a boyfriend who she met at Dr. Emilio Amigo's family counseling center and is best friends with Jessica.

== Reception ==
A reviewer for The Hollywood Reporter described the film as "touching"; remarking, "Compared to other documentaries about the condition, it's heartening to see one that accentuates the positive so much, showing families where the parents have managed to keep their marriages intact, where no one gets bullied, no one is a savant, and there's no mention of the debate around vaccines."

== Musical adaptation ==
In January 2018, Playbill reported that a musical based on the documentary was in development, with music by Jacob Yandura and book and lyrics by Rebekah Greer Melocik. The production was to be directed by longtime Broadway producer Harold Prince, who also served as a dramaturge on earlier drafts of the play. Upon Prince's death in 2019, Sammi Cannold took over as director. The musical's world premiere production at Syracuse Stage was announced in June 2022, featuring seven autistic actors playing characters inspired by the documentary participants and Wilson Jermaine Heredia in the role of Emilio Amigo. It was announced on July 20, 2023 that the musical would transfer to Broadway, with opening night scheduled for December 10 at the Belasco Theatre. The show, the first Broadway musical to cast actors with autism as characters with autism, opened to generally mixed to positive reviews.
