= Just in Time (musical) =

2025 jukebox musical

- A New Musical
- Promotional poster
- Music: Various Artists
- Lyrics: Various Artists
- Book: Warren Leight; Isaac Oliver
- Basis: The life and music of Bobby Darin
- Premiere: April 23, 2025: Circle in the Square Theatre
- Productions: 2025 Broadway

Just in Time is a jukebox musical based on the life of American singer Bobby Darin, with a book by Warren Leight and Isaac Oliver.

The musical premiered on April 23, 2025, at Broadway's Circle in the Square Theatre. The show starts with the lead performer portraying himself in 2025, and then goes back to the 1950s and 1960s to tell Darin's story.

== Origins and development ==
The musical originated as The Bobby Darin Story, a series of five concerts in 2018 at the 92nd Street Y starring Jonathan Groff as Darin, who has since developed it with Timbers, alongside music supervision and arrangements by Andrew Resnick and choreography by Shannon Lewis. On November 11, 2024, a benefit concert performance previewing Just in Time was held at the Signature Theatre in Arlington, Virginia. In December 2024, Billboard shared a preview of three of Groff's songs recorded for the musical: "Beyond the Sea", "Dream Lover", and "Just in Time". Other songs featured in the production include "Splish Splash" and "Mack the Knife".

== Production history ==
Based on an original concept by Ted Chapin, the musical premiered on April 23, 2025, at Broadway's Circle in the Square Theatre, with Alex Timbers as director and Jonathan Groff in the lead role as Darin.

Groff also serves as one of the production's producers, alongside Tom Kirdahy, Robert Ahrens, and John Frost, with previews from March 28, 2025. For the production, the theatre has been transformed into "an immersive nightclub-like destination" with two stages, a cabaret-style seating plan, and a big band on stage.

The cast of 16 also includes Joe Barbara, Michele Pawk, Lance Roberts, Caesar Samayoa, Christine Cornish, Julia Grondin, Valeria Yamin, John Treacy Egan, Tari Kelly, Matt Magnusson, Khori Michelle Petinaud, Larkin Reilly, and Emily Bergl, as well as Gracie Lawrence as Connie Francis and Erika Henningsen as Sandra Dee. Sadie Dickerson joined the cast as Sandra in September 2025 and Sarah Hyland joined as Connie in October. In April 2026, Jeremy Jordan replaced Groff as Darin. As CultureSauce put it, "Jeremy Jordan is tailor-made to play Bobby Darin, a legend with a golden voice, a hard-charging style, and charm to spare.". Matthew Morrison performed as Darin between Groff's final show and the beginning of Jordan's run. Also in April 2026, Carrie St. Louis and Debbie Gravitte joined the cast, respectively playing Sandra Dee and Polly, while Isa Briones replaced Hyland as Connie. Olivia Holt replaced Briones at the end of May. Upon Jordan leaving the show in October, Morrison will return for three weeks to portray Darin once again. Beginning November 10th, 2026, Nicholas Christopher will portray Darin.

== Synopsis ==
=== Act I ===
As the show begins, the theatre announcements introduce the specific actor playing Bobby Darin via an overture medley that leads into "The Start of Something Big" and "Just In Time". The performer personally welcomes the audience, and notes the similarities in Bobby's career and their own, as performers who value connection amongst peers. The actor then enters character as "Bobby" and sets the scene to be his childhood in New York City, where he was born as Walden Robert Cassotto ("Beyond the Sea").

Walden explains that he was chiefly raised by his grandmother Polly and older sister Nina. Due to a serious congenital heart condition, he is not expected to live past 16 years of age, leading Polly to instill a sense of urgency and Nina to care for him overbearingly. Upon graduating from the Bronx High School of Science, Walden realizes he wants to make the most of his limited time by working in music. However, his early efforts are limited to commercial jingle songwriting ("Orange Furniture Store"). One job puts him in contact with lowly-but-talented singer Connie Francis, and the two are almost instantly smitten ("First Real Love"). Despite similar Italian-American heritage, their relationship is forced to be clandestine due to the aggressive disapproval of Connie's dad. In an effort to raise his profile and to win him over, he changes his name to "Bobby Darin" after a broken Chinese restaurant sign and accepts a sudden opportunity to sing on television, despite his own initial hesitancy to become a singer.

Bobby's television appearance goes awry when he forgets many of the lyrics live on-air ("Rock Island Line"). His label does not give up on him, though, and he begins to climb the charts using derivative recordings of other popular songs from contemporaries like Elvis Presley ("Imitation Medley"). He continues to write these songs and submits one to popular New York City DJ Murray the K. Dismissive at first, following a friendly call with his mother, he challenges Bobby to write a song about taking a bath as an exercise in songwriting. Murray's initial doubts are shattered when Bobby writes the full song about it in 15 minutes, and the song ends up being a major hit single that catapults Bobby to national renown ("Splish Splash").

While visiting Connie before a performance, her father walks in on them while Bobby is in a bathrobe from a "Splish Splash" set piece, and he is chased out at gunpoint. Despite his pleas and proposal, Connie ends the relationship due to her father's rejection of Bobby ("Who's Sorry Now"). Reaffirming his passion for performance, Polly inspires a depressed Bobby to embrace his fame and take a shot at playing her favorite venue, the Copacabana nightclub ("That's All"). His first teen-oriented song is a success ("Queen of the Hop"), but before he is able to perform at the Copa, Polly dies, disillusioning Bobby ("The Good Life"). His managers help cheer him up during his impromptu performance one of Polly's favorite jazz standards ("Up a Lazy River"), and he proposes transitioning away from original songs to do an entire album of them; particularly, an experimental pop rendition of a selection from Bertolt Brecht's The Threepenny Opera, to their surprise. They refuse, citing it as too ambitious and expensive for a low payoff, even when Bobby offers to put the money up himself. Despite the roadblock, he personally funds the studio sessions to record it ("Mack the Knife").

=== Act II ===
Bobby has become a global superstar after the success of "Mack the Knife", winning two Grammy Awards and being cast in films ("Dream Lover"). His latest film is being shot in Italy, where is introduced to younger co-star Sandra Dee. Her own overbearing stage mother has meant she did not have much of a proper childhood, thrust into maturity at an early age ("Not for Me"). Bobby falls for her and devises schemes to win her heart ("Multiplication"), eventually doing so by wooing her mother ("Eighteen Yellow Roses"). Sandra and Bobby fall in love ("Irresistable You") and eventually wed and have a child ("Things"). However, constant touring schedules and dedication to his persona drive a wedge into their marriage, leading to Sandra to become an alcoholic. Torn between both personal fulfillment and his relationship, he chooses the former and divorces Sandra ("Rainin'").

In the aftermath of the divorce, Bobby seeks to throw his hat into political spaces, even being vetted by the Democratic party and working on Robert F. Kennedy's campaign. When he reveals to Nina that he may run for office, she expresses great concern and forbids him due to what personal information they may uncover about him. Nina reveals to a confused Bobby that she is actually his biological mother; Polly was his grandmother, who raised him as such to prevent family shame following Nina's teen pregnancy by an unknown father. Bobby casts Nina out and spirals into dejection and disillusionment ("I Am [Instrumental]"). His performances become erratic and he embraces denim, folk music, and counterculture, leading for him to get banned by the Copa and his career to be ruined. He loses everything in the divorce and becomes a recluse, moving to a small trailer in Big Sur, California alone.

Sandra visits Bobby some time later. They discuss fame and stardom, eventually leading Bobby to realize who he is and what he stands for in the face of a heart condition that should have killed him long ago ("If I Were a Carpenter"). He stages a comeback performance at the Copa; it is a massive success and revitalizes his career ("Once In a Lifetime / That's All (Reprise)"), but the performances are interspersed with heart palpitations. Eventually, Bobby dies due to a heart infection at 37. His colleagues and partners from his life continue to tell his story, and remind the audience to make the most of what they have in life. ("The Curtain Falls").

== Cast and characters ==
Character	Broadway
Character	2025
Bobby Darin	Jonathan Groff
Connie Francis	Gracie Lawrence
Sandra Dee	Erika Henningsen
Charlie Maffia and others	Joe Barbara
Murray the K and others	Lance Roberts
Nina Cassotto and others	Emily Bergl
Don Kirshner and others	Caesar Samayoa
Polly Walden	Michele Pawk

=== Notable replacements ===
- Bobby Darin: Matthew Morrison, Jeremy Jordan, Nicholas Christopher
- Connie Francis: Sarah Hyland, Isa Briones, Olivia Holt, Ariana Madix
- Sandra Dee: Sadie Dickerson, Carrie St. Louis, Whitney Leavitt
- Polly: Debbie Gravitte

== Musical numbers ==
=== Act 1 ===
- This Could Be the Start of Something Big / Just in Time - Bobby and Sirens
- Beyond the Sea - Bobby
- Orange Furniture Store† - Bobby and Don
- First Real Love - Connie and Bobby
- Rock Island Line† - Bobby
- Imitation Medley - Bobby, Elvis Presley, Riders in the Sky, Connie and Sirens
- Splish Splash - Bobby and Sirens
- Who's Sorry Now - Connie
- That's All - Polly and Bobby
- Queen of the Hop - Bobby and Sirens
- The Good Life - Nina
- Up a Lazy River - Bobby, Polly, Stephen Blauner, and Ahmet Ertegun
- Mack the Knife - Bobby

=== Act 2 ===
- Dream Lover - Bobby and Sirens
- Not for Me - Sandra
- Multiplication - Angelo and Charlie
- Eighteen Yellow Roses† - Mary, Sandra, Bobby and Sirens
- Irresistible You - Bobby and Sandra
- Things - Bobby, Sandra, "Guys" and Sirens
- Rainin' - Bobby and Sandra
- I Am§ - Bobby
- If I Were a Carpenter - Bobby and Sandra
- Once in a Lifetime / That's All - Bobby and Sirens
- The Curtain Falls - Bobby
- Curtain Call Medley - Company

† Not listed in playbill, but included on the cast recording as a Bonus Track

§ Included in the musical, only as an Instrumental, but full song included on the cast recording

== Awards and nominations ==
Year	Award	Category	Nominee(s)	Result	Ref.
2025	Drama Desk Awards	Outstanding Musical	Just in Time	Nominated	
2025	Drama Desk Awards	Outstanding Lead Performance in a Musical	Jonathan Groff	Nominated	
2025	Drama Desk Awards	Outstanding Featured Performance in a Musical	Gracie Lawrence	Nominated	
2025	Drama Desk Awards	Outstanding Direction of a Musical	Alex Timbers	Nominated	
2025	Drama Desk Awards	Outstanding Book of a Musical	Warren Leight and Isaac Oliver	Nominated	
2025	Drama Desk Awards	Outstanding Orchestrations	Andrew Resnick and Michael Thurber	Won	
2025	Drama Desk Awards	Outstanding Scenic Design of a Musical	Derek McLane	Nominated	
2025	Drama Desk Awards	Outstanding Costume Design of a Musical	Catherine Zuber	Nominated	
2025	Drama Desk Awards	Outstanding Sound Design of a Musical	Peter Hylenski	Won	
2025	Drama League Awards	Outstanding Production of a Musical	Just in Time	Nominated	
2025	Drama League Awards	Outstanding Direction of a Musical	Alex Timbers	Nominated	
2025	Drama League Awards	Distinguished Performance	Jonathan Groff	Nominated	
2025	Drama League Awards	Distinguished Performance	Gracie Lawrence	Nominated	
2025	Tony Awards	Best Leading Actor in a Musical	Jonathan Groff	Nominated	
2025	Tony Awards	Best Featured Actress in a Musical	Gracie Lawrence	Nominated	
2025	Tony Awards	Best Orchestrations	Andrew Resnick and Michael Thurber	Nominated	
2025	Tony Awards	Best Costume Design of a Musical	Catherine Zuber	Nominated	
2025	Tony Awards	Best Scenic Design of a Musical	Derek McLane	Nominated	
2025	Tony Awards	Best Sound Design of a Musical	Peter Hylenski	Nominated	
2025	Dorian Awards	Outstanding Broadway Musical		Nominated	

== See also ==
- Dream Lover: The Bobby Darin Musical – another musical based on Darin's life
