= Katie Rose Clarke =

American musical theater actress (born 1984)

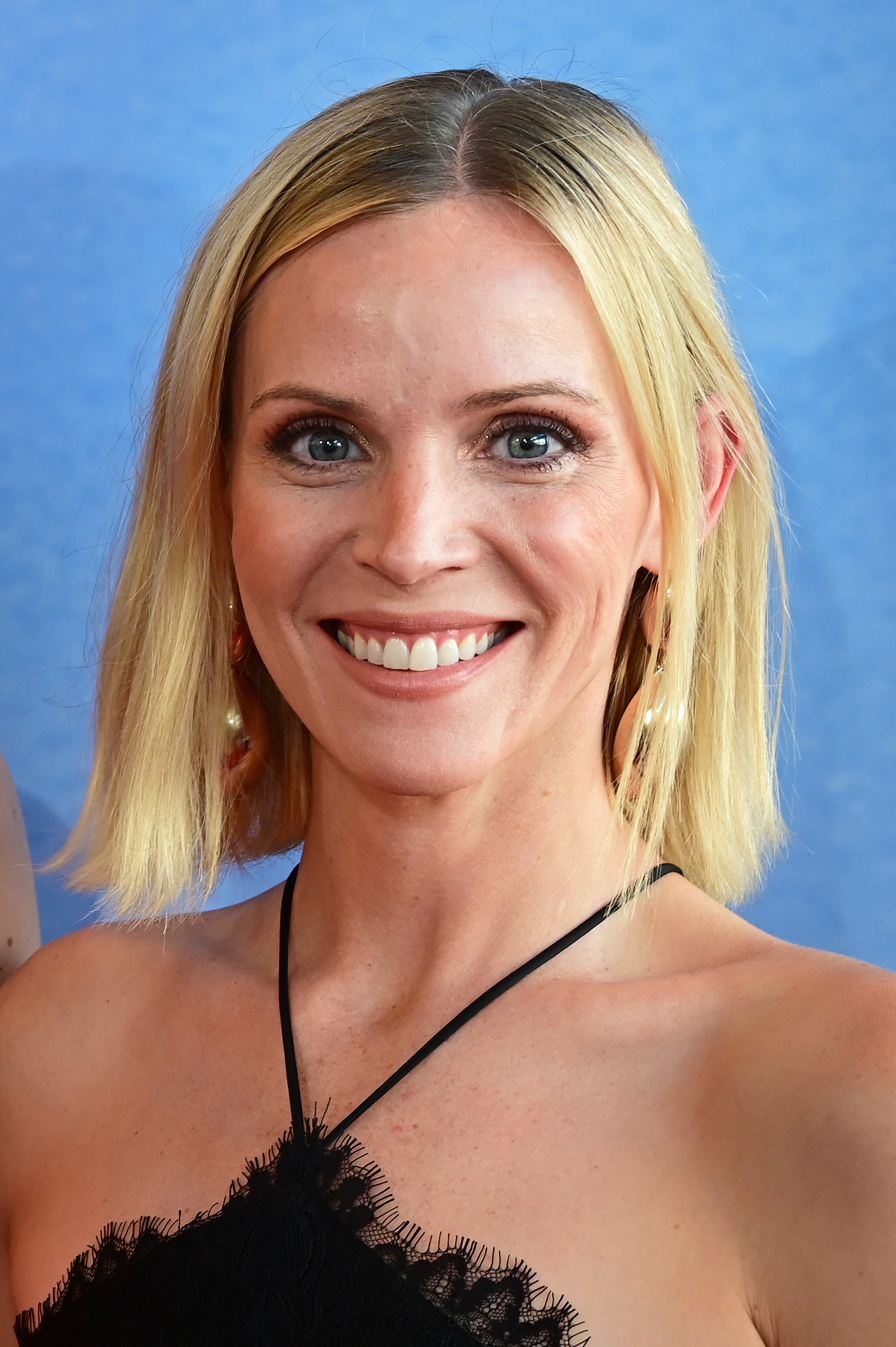
- Clarke in 2026
- Born: Katherine Rose Clarke; August 25, 1984 (age 42); Friendswood, Texas, U.S.
- Occupation: Musical theatre actress
- Years active: 2005–present
- Spouse: Christopher Alan Rogers (m. 2012)
- Children: 3
- Website: Official website

Katherine Rose Clarke (born August 25, 1984, in Friendswood, Texas) is an American musical theater actress.

== Early life and education ==
Clarke got her start acting and singing in the United Methodist Church. Clarke is a BFA graduate in musical theatre of Sam Houston State University.

== Career ==
Clarke made her Broadway debut in The Light in the Piazza on December 9, 2005, at the age of 21, at the Vivian Beaumont Theater under the name "Katie Clarke". Clarke succeeded Kelli O'Hara in the part of Clara Johnson, after O'Hara had left the show to play Babe Williams opposite Harry Connick Jr. in The Pajama Game. She first came to national attention for her portrayal of Clara Johnson in the Broadway production, the live PBS broadcast, and the national tour of The Light in the Piazza.

Her other theater credits include Craig Lucas' 2007 play Prayer for my Enemy at the Long Wharf Theatre in New Haven, Connecticut, and the Deborah Abramson/William Finn musical revue Travels With My Discontent at the Barrington Stage Company. She also performed in the regional production of TUTS Houston Anything Goes in the ensemble. She was profiled in The New York Times in January 2006.

Clarke then portrayed the role of Glinda on the first national tour of the musical Wicked. She succeeded Christina DeCicco on November 6, 2007, and starred alongside Carmen Cusack as Elphaba, who was later replaced by her standby Donna Vivino. She left the company in San Diego, California, on August 16, 2009, and was replaced by Chandra Lee Schwartz.

She later reprised the role of Glinda at the Gershwin Theatre on Broadway on January 14, 2010, replacing Erin Mackey. She starred alongside Dee Roscioli, Mandy Gonzalez and Teal Wicks during her run. Clarke took medical leave in March/April 2011, during which time the role of Glinda was played by Laura Woyasz. Clarke left the Broadway company on September 25, 2011, and was replaced again by Schwartz.

Clarke returned to the 1st National Tour of Wicked as Glinda on November 15, 2011, replacing Amanda Jane Cooper. She was joined by Kyle Dean Massey, who had played the role of Fiyero alongside her in the Broadway production. During this run, she starred opposite Mamie Parris as Elphaba.

She and Massey finished their limited engagement with the tour company on February 23, 2012, with Alli Mauzey replacing Clarke as Glinda. She returned to the role of Glinda in the Broadway production of Wicked from April 23, 2013, to September 22, 2013, where she starred alongside Willemijn Verkaik and later Lindsay Mendez. She was replaced by Alli Mauzey, whom she herself had replaced when she rejoined the show.

In November 2013, Clarke made her cabaret debut at 54 Below, where she performed a mix of acoustic pop, folk, country, and original songs.

In March 2014, Clarke appeared in the York Theatre Company's production of the 1960 musical Tenderloin as part of their Musicals in Mufti series.

In May 2014, Clarke returned to the Long Wharf Theatre to star as Cathy Hyatt in Jason Robert Brown's two person musical, The Last Five Years.

In October 2015, Clarke originated the role of Hannah in the Broadway production of Allegiance, which closed in February 2016. She was cast as Ellen in the Broadway revival of Miss Saigon, which began performances on March 1, 2017, and closed on January 14, 2018. Clarke once again returned to the role of Glinda in the Broadway production of Wicked beginning December 11, 2018, replacing Amanda Jane Cooper. She starred opposite Jessica Vosk and played her final performance on April 7, 2019, being replaced by Ginna Claire Mason. Clarke currently holds the record for longest-running actress to play the role of Glinda on Broadway.

In 2020, Clarke starred as Tary in the groundbreaking musical podcast, Propaganda!.

Beginning in September 2023, Clarke starred as Beth Shepard in the first Broadway revival of Merrily We Roll Along after playing the role at the New York Theatre Workshop in 2022. She is featured in the movie adaptation of the stage musical.

In May 2025, Clarke was announced as one of three actresses to play Dolly Parton in Dolly: An Original Musical, a jukebox musical based on Parton's life and career.

== Personal life ==
On December 15, 2012, Clarke married Christopher Alan Rogers. They have three children; Eleanor Rose Rogers, Jack Hardin Rogers, and Mabel Anne Rogers. Clarke is a Christian and attends church and Bible study. She and her family kept a maltipoo named Samson.

== Credits ==
Broadway

- Dolly: A True Original Musical as Dolly Parton (2027-TBA)
- Merrily We Roll Along as Beth Shepard (2023–2024)
- Miss Saigon as Ellen Scott (2017–2018)
- Allegiance as Hannah Campbell (2015)
- Wicked as Glinda (replacement) (2010–2011; 2013; 2018–2019)
- The Light in the Piazza as Clara Johnson (replacement) (2005–2006)

Off-Broadway

- Merrily We Roll Along as Beth Shepard (2022–2023)

Regional theater

- The Heart of Rock and Roll as Cassandra (2018)
- The Last Five Years as Cathy (2014)
- Tenderloin (2014)
- Anything Goes (2007)
- Prayer for my Enemy as Marianne (2007)
- Travels With My Discontent (2006)

National tours

- Wicked as Glinda (replacement) (2007–2009; 2011–2012)
- The Light in the Piazza as Clara Johnson

Readings

- I Can Get It For You Wholesale (2017)

Concerts

- Parade as Mrs. Frances Phagan at Lincoln Center (2015)
- Back on the Ground at 54 Below (2013)

Television and film

- Maybe There's a Tree as Jane (post-production)
- Relevant as Sharon (2016-2017), five episodes
- The Good Wife as Reena Booth (2014), one episode
- Live from Lincoln Center: The Light in the Piazza as Clara Johnson / Herself (2006)

Podcasts

- Propaganda! The Podcast Musical as Tary (2020)
