= Dolly: A True Original Musical =

Dolly
- A True Original Musical
- Artwork for Hello, I'm Dolly, a working title
- Music: Dolly Parton
- Lyrics: Dolly Parton
- Book: Dolly Parton; Maria S. Schlatter
- Premiere: July 2025: Nashville
- Productions: 2025 Nashville

Dolly: A True Original Musical (also known as Hello, I'm Dolly) is a stage musical based on the life and career of American singer-songwriter Dolly Parton. In addition to Parton's music and lyrics, she co-wrote the book and collaborated as a producer. The production premiered in Nashville, Tennessee, in 2025, and was announced to premiere on Broadway in December 2026 at the St. James Theatre.

== Premise ==
Parton's autobiography offers a "rags-to-riches story from her barefoot beginnings in the Smoky Mountains of East Tennessee to performing in platform heels under the bright lights of Hollywood." The musical features Parton's hit songs as well as new songs.

== Development ==
The first table read for an untitled musical based on Dolly Parton's life took place in 2023, with Carrie St. Louis reading for the music superstar. Parton announced plans for the new musical in June 2024, initially titled Hello, I'm Dolly.

Producers subsequently announced an open casting call for Dolly: An Original Musical, prompting thousands of submissions on social media. Two actors from the search were cast in the 2025 Nashville production.

== Productions ==
=== 2025 Nashville premiere ===
The musical premiered in July 2025 at the Belmont University Fisher Center for the Performing Arts in Nashville, Tennessee, running July 18 through August 17, 2025, with an official opening on August 8. Tony winner Bartlett Sher directed the production. Carrie St. Louis, Katie Rose Clarke, and Quinn Titcomb all portrayed Parton at various stages of her life.

The production received generally positive reception, with Knox News praising the show as an "honest, hilarious musical" and the "amazing performances and stellar songs." American Songwriter similarly lauded the production as a "triumph," while Cowboys & Indians noted the show's pacing needed work, noting it was "slow to take off" and "palpably rushed" at other parts.

=== 2026 Broadway production ===
The production was announced to premiere on Broadway beginning in December 2026 at the St. James Theatre. The production is set to begin previews on December 7, 2026, with an official opening on January 19, 2027, which would have been Parton's 81st birthday. The cast will include Katie Rose Clarke and Carrie St. Louis from the Nashville production.

== Cast and characters ==
Character	2025 Nashville	2026 Broadway
Dolly Parton	Katie Rose Clarke	Katie Rose Clarke
Dolly Parton	Carrie St. Louis	Carrie St. Louis
Dolly Parton	Quinn Titcomb	Norah Nunes
Carl Dean	John Behlmann	John Behlmann
Porter Wagoner	John Zdrojeski	Gabriel Ebert
Judy Ogle	Beth Malone	Crystal Kellogg
Little Judy Ogle	Tabitha Lawing	-
Uncle Bill	Danny Wolohan	-
Sandy Gallin	Jacob Fishel	-
