= May Wine =

- Sheet Music Cover (cropped)
- Music: Sigmund Romberg
- Lyrics: Oscar Hammerstein, II
- Book: Frank Mandel
- Basis: novel The Happy Alienist
- Productions: 1935 Broadway

May Wine is a musical with a book by Frank Mandel, lyrics by Oscar Hammerstein II, and music by Sigmund Romberg. The show was adapted from the novel The Happy Alienist by Eric von Stroheim and Wallace Smith. The story concerns the rich and absent-minded psychology professor, Johann Volk, who falls in love with Marie (Baroness von Schlewitz). The malevolent Baron Kuno Adelhorst, who also loves Marie, tries to get the professor's money by having Marie marry him, but after they are married she comes to love the professor and does not want to blackmail him. However, the Professor thinks he has been deceived and tries to shoot Marie. He does not hurt her, and all ends well. The subplot involves an artist's model, Friedl, who wants a man's attention and gets it from the Baron.

The Broadway production opened on December 5, 1935 at the St. James Theatre, where it ran for a modestly successful 213 performances despite the reservations of reviewers about the book. Romberg's Viennese-style score was praised. The cast included Walter Slezak as Johann, Nancy McCord as Marie, Betty Allen as Friedl and Walter Woolf King as Kuno. The orchestrations were by Don Walker, who later worked with Romberg several times.

Romberg and Hammerstein had worked together on the hit operetta The New Moon in 1928.

== Songs ==
Act 1

- Something in the Air of May – Prof. Johann Volk
- Interlude in a Barber Shop – Johann and Baron Kuno Adelhorst
- A Chanson in the Prater – Johann, Marie, Father and Mother
- A Doll Fantasy – Marie
- You Wait and Wait and Wait – Marie and Kuno
- I Built a Dream Today (One Day) – Johann, Kuno and Josef (a clarinet player)
- Dance, My Darlings – Marie and Ensemble

Act II

- Always Be a Gentleman – Marie and Kuno
- I Built a Dream Today (One Day) (Reprise) – Josef
- Somebody Ought To Be Told – Friedl (Willie's model)
- Something New Is in My Heart – Marie
- (Just) Once Around the Clock – Friedl, Kuno and Uncle Pishka
- Something New Is in My Heart (Reprise) – Marie
