= Two Hearts in Waltz Time (1934 film) =

1934 British film

- Frances Day and Carl Brisson
- Directed by: Carmine Gallone; Joe May
- Written by: Reginald Fogwell; John McNally; Walter Reisch; Franz Schulz
- Produced by: Reginald Fogwell
- Starring: Carl Brisson; Frances Day
- Cinematography: Geoffrey Faithfull
- Music by: Robert Stolz
- Production companies: Reginald Fogwell Productions; Nettlefold Studios
- Distributed by: Gaumont British Distributors
- Release date: April 1934
- Running time: 80 minutes
- Country: United Kingdom
- Language: English

Two Hearts in Waltz Time is a 1934 British musical romance film directed by Carmine Gallone and Joe May and starring Carl Brisson, Frances Day, Bert Coote and Roland Culver. A composer falls in love with the star of an opera company. The music is by Robert Stolz, originally written for a German version in 1930.

It was made at Nettlefold Studios, with sets were designed by the art director Andrew Mazzei. In 1938 the film was adapted into a stage musical entitled Lost Waltz and was mounted by the St. Louis Municipal Opera with soprano Nancy McCord.

== Preservation status ==
The British Film Institute National Archive holds a collection of ephemera and stills but no film or video materials.

== Cast ==
- Carl Brisson as Carl Hoffman
- Frances Day as Helene Barry
- Bert Coote as Danielli
- Oscar Asche as Herman Greenbaum
- C. Denier Warren as Meyer
- Roland Culver as Freddie
- William Jenkins as Max
- Peter Gawthorne as Mr Joseph
- Valerie Hobson as Susie

== Reception ==
Kine Weekly wrote: "Although the story is nebulous, it nevertheless combines music, sentiment and humour in happy proportions, and enables the star to hold the centre of the screen and give his fans full money's worth."

The Daily Film Renter wrote: "Haunting song melodies, chorus dancing and quota of comedy are highlights. Slick direction invests plot with surface glitter, settings taking in authentic theatre locale. A delightful entertainment."
