= Sammi Cannold =

American film director

Sammi Cannold is an American film and theater director. Cannold was the recipient of the 2024 Drama Desk Award.

== Career ==
Cannold received a bachelor's degree from Stanford University and master's degree from the Harvard Graduate School of Education. She made her Broadway debut in 2023, at the Belasco Theater with How to Dance in Ohio, which earned her the Drama Desk Award. Cannold was trained under Diane Paulus, and Rachel Chavkin, serving as the associate director on the Broadway production of Natasha, Pierre & the Great Comet of 1812, as well as working at the American Repertory Theater.

In 2019, Cannold directed the world premier of Celine Song's Endlings, making her the youngest female director in the American Repertory Theater's history, prior to directing its off-Broadway premier at New York Theatre Workshop in 2020. She also directed Ragtime, Violet on a moving bus, Evita at New York City Center, and Carmen at Rose Hall, Lincoln Center. Cannold's Evita was a critical success.

In 2022, Cannold and her mother, Dori Berinstein, announced a documentary, The Show Must Go On, which premiered at Majestic Theatre on August 9, 2021 and was released on Apple TV.

== Personal life ==
Cannold is married to non-profit worker Safi Rauf.
