= Andrew Durand =

American actor (born 1986)

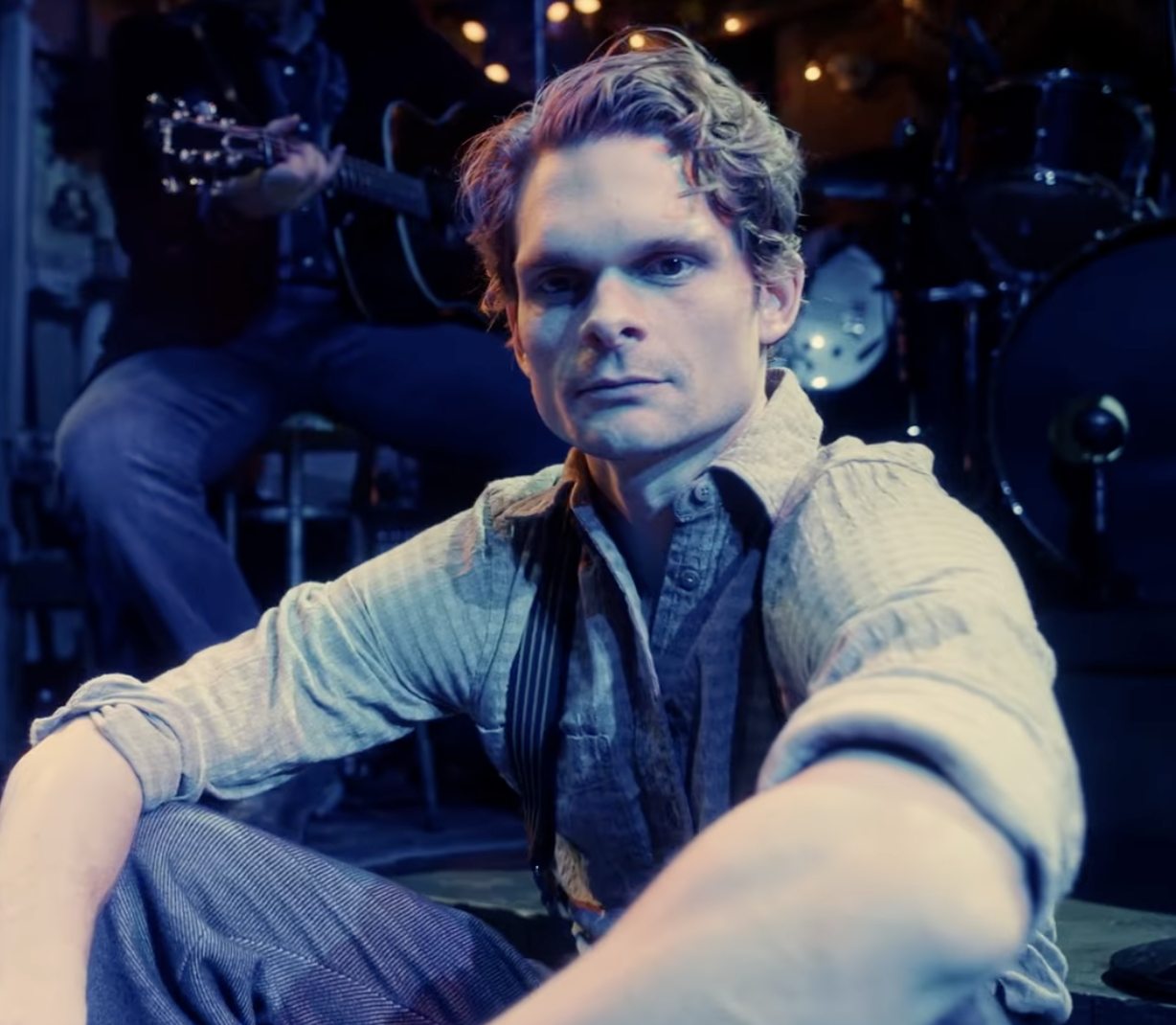
- Durand in 2024
- Born: January 17, 1986 (age 40); Roswell, Georgia, U.S.
- Education: Boston Conservatory (BFA)
- Occupations: Actor; singer
- Years active: 2008–present

Andrew Durand (born January 17, 1986) is an American actor, known for his roles on Broadway in Shucked and Dead Outlaw, the latter for which he was nominated for the 2025 Tony Award for Best Leading Actor in a Musical. He has also received two Drama Desk Award nominations for Shucked and Dead Outlaw.

== Early life ==
Originally from Roswell, Georgia, Durand started acting after seeing a play at the community theater Village Playhouses of Roswell. Durand attended North Springs High School and Boston Conservatory.

== Career ==
After graduating, Durand's first professional roles were in Boston. He played Fiddlin' John in Parade and Steve in Zanna, Don't! at the SpeakEasy Stage Company in 2007.

The next year, he made his Broadway debut as a replacement for Georg in the Tony-winning production of Spring Awakening. The next year, he joined the Off-Broadway production of The Burnt Part Boys and its transfer to Playwrights Horizons. The same year, he appeared in Yank! at York Theatre Company. Both of the plays he was in that year were in New York.

In 2012, he joined the cast of the Tony-winning play War Horse as Albert Narracot. In 2013, he performed as Boyet in The Public Theater's production of Love's Labour's Lost, as part of its summer Shakespeare in the Park series.

His next Broadway appearance was his first time originating a role, playing Musidorus in the 2018 Broadway premiere of The Go-Go's jukebox musical Head Over Heels, a role he played through the show's closing in 2019. He returned later in 2019 in the Broadway premiere of Ink, as Beverly/Christopher Timothy. The play was nominated for the Tony Award for Best Play.

Durand's next role was in the 2023 Broadway premiere of Shucked, a musical from Robert Horn, Brandy Clark, and Shane McAnally. For this performance as Beau, he was nominated for a Drama Desk Award.

In 2024, Durand starred as Elmer McCurdy in the Off-Broadway premiere of Dead Outlaw, receiving an Outer Critics Circle Award and a Clarence Derwent Award. The performance also earned him Drama Desk Award and Lucille Lortel Award nominations, and Drama League Distinguished Performance and Tony Award nominations after the production transferred to Broadway.

He then performed in a New York City Center Encores! production, playing Jim Farrell in its 2024 revival of Titanic. He also played Rick Taylor in Encores's 2025 revival of Bat Boy: The Musical. Durand also appeared in the film Here Today.

== Theatre ==
| Year | Production | Role | Venue | Category | Ref. |
|---|---|---|---|---|---|
| 2007 | Parade | Fiddlin' John | SpeakEasy Stage Company | Regional | |
| 2007 | Zanna, Don't! | Steve | SpeakEasy Stage Company | Regional | |
| 2008-2009 | Spring Awakening | Georg | Eugene O'Neill Theatre | Broadway | |
| 2009 | The Burnt Part Boys | Chet | Powerhouse Theater | Off-Broadway | |
| 2010 | The Burnt Part Boys | Chet | Playwrights Horizons | Off-Broadway | |
| 2010 | Yank! | Performer | York Theatre | Off-Broadway | |
| 2011 | The Umbrellas of Cherbourg | Guy | The Gielgud Theatre | West End | |
| 2011 | The Nightingale | Performer | Powerhouse Theater | Off-Broadway | |
| 2011 | The Unauthorized Autobiography of Samantha Brown | Adam | The Norma Terris Theatre | Regional | |
| 2011 | The Wild Bride | The Devil | St. Ann's Warehouse | Off-Broadway | |
| 2012 | War Horse | Albert Narracott | Vivian Beaumont Theater | Broadway | |
| 2013 | Love's Labour's Lost | Boyet | Delacorte Theater | Off-Broadway | |
| 2013 | Tristan & Iseult | Tristan | U.S. National Tour | | |
| 2015 | Gigantic | Brent | Vineyard Theatre | Off-Broadway | |
| 2016 | The Robber Bridegroom | Little Harp | Laura Pels Theatre | Off-Broadway | |
| 2017 | Assassins | Ensemble | New York City Center | Off-Broadway, Encores! | |
| 2018-2019 | Head Over Heels | Musidorus / Cleophila | Hudson Theatre | Broadway | |
| 2019 | Ink | Beverley / Christopher Timothy | Samuel J. Friedman Theater | Broadway | |
| 2022 | Shucked | Beau | Pioneer Theatre Company | Regional | |
| 2023-2024 | Shucked | Beau | Nederlander Theater | Broadway | |
| 2024 | Dead Outlaw | Elmer McCurdy | The Minetta Lane Theater | Off-Broadway | |
| 2024 | Titanic | Jim Farrell | New York City Center | Off-Broadway, Encores! | |
| 2025 | Dead Outlaw | Elmer McCurdy | The Longacre Theater | Broadway | |
| 2025 | High Society | Macaulay “Mike” Connor | Ogunquit Playhouse | Regional | |
| 2025 | Bat Boy: The Musical | Rick Taylor / Skunk | New York City Center | Off-Broadway, Encores! | |
| 2025-2026 | Little Shop of Horrors | Orin Scrivello and others | Westside Theatre | Off-Broadway | |
| 2026 | Oklahoma! | Will Parker | Carnegie Hall | Concert | |
| 2026 | The Rocky Horror Show | Brad Majors | Studio 54 | Broadway | |
| 2026 | The Curious Case of Benjamin Button | Benjamin Button / Reverthi | The Public Theater | Off-Broadway | |

== Filmography ==
| Year | Title | Role | Notes | Ref. |
|---|---|---|---|---|
| 2013 | It Could Be Worse | Bryce | Episode: "So, We Meet Again" | |
| 2015 | Madam Secretary | Kyle Feeney | Episode: "Whisper of the Ax" | |
| 2020 | NCIS: New Orleans | Hunter Marsh | Episode: "Bad Moon Rising" | |
| 2021 | Here Today | Darrell | Feature film | |
| 2021 | One December Night | Troy | TV Movie | |
| 2022 | Law & Order: Organized Crime | | Episode: "As Hubris is to Oedipus" | |
| 2023 | Servant | Ash | 2 episodes | |
| 2024 | Hazbin Hotel | Prick | 3 episodes | |

== Awards and nominations ==
| Year | Award | Category | Work | Result |
|---|---|---|---|---|
| 2023 | Drama Desk Award | Outstanding Lead Performance in a Musical | Shucked | Nominated |
| 2024 | Grammy Awards | Best Musial Theater Album | Shucked | Nominated |
| 2024 | Drama Desk Award | Outstanding Lead Performance in a Musical | Dead Outlaw | Nominated |
| 2024 | Lucille Lortel Award | Outstanding Lead Performer in a Musical | Dead Outlaw | Nominated |
| 2024 | Outer Critics Circle Award | Outstanding Lead Performer in an Off-Broadway Musical | Dead Outlaw | Won |
| 2024 | Clarence Derwent Award | | Dead Outlaw | Won |
| 2025 | Drama League Award | Distinguished Performance | Dead Outlaw | Nominated |
| 2025 | Tony Award | Best Actor in a Musical | Dead Outlaw | Nominated |
| 2026 | Outer Critics Circle Award | Outstanding Featured Performer in a Broadway Musical | The Rocky Horror Show | Nominated |
