= Kaye Voyce =

American costume designer

- Education: New York University (BFA, MFA)
- Occupation: Costume Designer

Kaye Voyce is an Obie Award winning New York City based costume designer known for her extensive Off-Broadway work and her work in Broadway theatres on Significant Other, directed by Trip Cullman, The Real Thing, directed by Sam Gold, starring Ewan McGregor and Maggie Gyllenhaal, and the 2019 revival of Sam Shepard's True West starring Ethan Hawke and Paul Dano produced by Roundabout Theatre Company.

== Early life ==
Voyce received her BFA and MFA from New York University Tisch School of the Arts in 1994.

== Career ==
=== Off-Broadway ===
Year	Production	Role	Theater	Ref.
1996	Edmond	Costume Designer	Linda Gross Theater/Atlantic Theatre Company	
1996	Marlowe's Eye	Costume Designer	Theater at St. Clement's Church	
1997	Mud, River, Stone	Costume Designer	Playwrights Horizons	
1997	Therese Raquin	Costume Designer	East 13th Street Theater/Classic Stage Company	
1997	Under a Western Sky	Costume Designer	INTAR Theater	
1997	Tartuffe	Costume Designer	Court Theatre	
1997	The Flatted Fifth	Costume Designer	INTAR Theater	
1998	Stop Kiss	Costume Designer	Susan Stein Shiva Theater	
1998	The Fastest Clock in the Universe	Costume Designer	INTAR Theater	
1999	Look Back in Anger	Costume Designer	East 13th Street Theater/Classic Stage Company	
2000	Arms and the Man	Costume Designer	Gramercy Theater	
2001	True Love	Costume Designer	Zipper Theatre	
2002	Ghosts	Costume Designer	East 13th Street Theater/Classic Stage Company	
2003	Dublin Carol	Costume Designer	Linda Gross Theater/Atlantic Theatre Company	
2004	Fabulation, or the Re-Education of Undine	Costume Designer	Peter Jay Sharp Theater at Playwrights Horizons	
2004	Here Lies Johnny	Costume Designer	Zipper Theatre	
2004	Guinea Pig Solo	Costume Designer	Susan Stein Shiva Theater	
2004	Johnny Guitar	Costume Designer	Century Center For The Performing Arts	
2006	Faust, Parts I&II	Costume Designer	East 13th Street Theater/Classic Stage Company	
2006	The Music Teacher	Costume Designer	Minetta Lane Theatre	
2007	Beckett Shorts	Costume Designer	New York Theatre Workshop	
2007	All the Wrong Reasons: A True Story of Neo-Nazis, Drug Smuggling, and Undying Love	Costume Designer	New York Theatre Workshop	
2008	Paradise Park	Costume Designer	Peter Norton Space	
2009	The Bacchae	Costume Designer	Delacorte Theater/The Public Theater	
2009	Inked Baby	Costume Designer	Peter Jay Sharp Theater at Playwrights Horizons	
2010	After the Revolution	Costume Designer	Peter Jay Sharp Theater at Playwrights Horizons	
2011	4000 miles	Costume Designer	The Duke on 42nd Street	
2012	The Great God Pan	Costume Designer	Playwrights Horizons	
2012	Detroit	Costume Designer	Playwrights Horizons	
2012	Heartless	Costume Designer	Irene Diamond Stage	
2012	Harrison, TX: Three Plays by Horton Foote	Costume Designer	59E59 Theaters	
2012	4000 miles	Costume Designer	Mitzi E. Newhouse Theater/Lincoln Center Theater	
2013	Luce	Costume Designer	Claire Tow Theater/Lincoln Center Theatre	
2014	The Wayside Motor Inn	Costume Designer	Alice Griffin Jewel Box Theater	
2015	Significant Other	Costume Designer	Laura Pels Theater/Roundabout Theatre Company	
2015	Forever	Costume Designer	New York Theatre Workshop	
2015	The Mystery of Love & Sex	Costume Designer	Mitzi E. Newhouse Theater/Lincoln Center Theater	
2016	Indian Summer	Costume Designer	Playwrights Horizons	
2016	Ironbound	Costume Designer	Rattlestick Theatre	
2016	A Funny Thing Happened on the Way to the Gynecologic Oncology Unit at Memorial Sloan-Kettering Cancer Center of New York City	Costume Designer	Lucille Lortel Theater	
2016	Signature Plays: Edward Albee's The Sandbox, Maria Irene Fornes' Drowning, and Adrienne Kennedy's Funnyhouse of a Negro	Costume Designer	Alice Griffin Jewel Box Theater	
2017	Harry Clarke	Costume Designer	Vineyard Theater	
2017	Office Hour	Costume Designer	Martinson Hall	
2017	After the Blast	Costume Designer	Claire Tow Theater/Lincoln Center Theatre	
2017	Measure for Measure	Costume Designer	LuEsther Hall/The Public Theater	
2017	Hamlet	Costume Designer	Anspacher Theater	
2017	The Antipodes	Costume Designer	Romulus Linney Courtyard Theatre	
2018	queens	Costume Designer	Claire Tow Theater/Lincoln Center Theatre	
2018	Edward Albee's At Home at the Zoo: Homelife & The Zoo Story	Costume Designer	Irene Diamond Stage	
2019	Marys Seacole	Costume Designer	Claire Tow Theater/Lincoln Center Theatre	
2019	Coriolanus	Costume Designer	Delacorte Theatre/The Public Theater	
2019	Greater Clements	Costume Designer	Mitzi E. Newhouse Theater/Lincoln Center Theater	
2022	The Bedwetter	Costume Designer	Linda Gross Theater/Atlantic Theatre Company	
2024	The Welkin	Costume Designer	Linda Gross Theater/Atlantic Theatre Company	
2025	We Had a World	Costume Designer	City Center Stage 2	
2025	The Seat of Our Pants	Costume Designer	The Public Theater	

=== Broadway ===
Year	Show	Role	Venue	Ref.
2006	Shining City	Costume Designer	Biltmore Theater	
2014	The Realistic Jonses	Costume Designer	Lyceum Theater	
2014	The Real Thing	Costume Designer	American Airlines Theater	
2017	Significant Other	Costume Designer	Booth Theatre	
2018	The Nap	Costume Designer	Samuel J. Friedman Theatre	
2019	True West	Costume Designer	American Airlines Theater	
2019	Sea Wall/A Life	Costume Designer	Hudson Theatre	
2024	Uncle Vanya	Costume Designer	Vivian Beaumont Theatre	
2026	Becky Shaw	Costume Designer	Helen Hayes Theatre	

=== Opera ===
Year	Opera	Venue	Ref.
2018	The Demon	Fisher Center's Sosnoff Theater (Annandale)	
2022	Angels in America	Salzburger Landestheater (Austria)	
2022–2023	The Merry Widow	Opernhaus Wuppertal (Germany)	
2022	The Listeners	Oslo Opera House (Norway)	
2022	Faust	Detroit Opera House	

== Awards and nominations ==
Year	Award	Category	Work	Result	Ref.
1997	Jeff Award	Outstanding Costume Design	Tartuffe	Won	
2004	Lucille Lortel Award	Outstanding Costume Design	Johnny Guitar	Nominated	
2016	Obie Award	Sustained Excellence in Costume Design		Won	
2019	Lucille Lortel Award	Outstanding Costume Design	Marys Seacole	Nominated	
2019	Henry Hewes Award	Costume Design	Marys Seacole / Everyone’s Fine With Virginia Woolf	Nominated	
2020	Drama Desk Award	Outstanding Costume Design of a Play	Coriolanus	Nominated	
2024	Henry Hewes Award	Costume Design	Staff Meal	Nominated	
2026	Drama Desk Award	Outstanding Costume Design of a Musical	The Seat of Our Pants	Nominated	
2026	Lucille Lortel Award	Outstanding Costume Design	The Seat of Our Pants	Nominated	
