= Dogfight (musical) =

2012 musical by Benj Pasek and Justin Paul

- Original Off-Broadway cast album cover
- Music: Benj Pasek; Justin Paul
- Lyrics: Benj Pasek; Justin Paul
- Book: Peter Duchan
- Basis: Dogfight by Bob Comfort
- Productions: 2012 Off-Broadway; 2014 Off-West End

Dogfight is a stage musical with music and lyrics by Benj Pasek and Justin Paul, and a book by Peter Duchan. It is based on the 1991 film of the same name. The musical premiered off-Broadway at the Second Stage Theatre in 2012, and in August 2014, the musical had its European premiere at the Southwark Playhouse in London.

== Productions ==
Dogfight opened on July 16, 2012, at the Second Stage Theatre, after previews from June 27, and concluded its limited run on August 19 after 23 previews and 40 regular performances. The show was directed by Joe Mantello and choreographed by Christopher Gattelli. Its original production starred Lindsay Mendez as Rose, Derek Klena as Eddie, and Josh Segarra as Boland. The cast also included Nick Blaemire, Annaleigh Ashford, Steven Booth, Becca Ayers, Adam Halpin, Dierdre Friel, F. Michael Haynie, and James Moye. David Zinn designed sets and costumes and Paul Gallo designed the lights.

The show received rave reviews for its writers and for leading lady Lindsay Mendez's performance.

The Dogfight original cast recording was released on April 30, 2013.

=== Other productions ===
Dogfight played at the Southwark Playhouse in London from August 8, 2014, through September 13, 2014, in a production directed by Matt Ryan and starring Laura Jane Matthewson as Rose and Jamie Muscato as Eddie.

The first New York regional production played White Plains Performing Arts Center September 19–21, 2014, produced by WPPAC and the Harrison Summer Theatre.

The Australian premiere is presented by Neil Gooding Productions in association with the Hayes Theatre Co, Sydney, opening on May 1, 2015, with direction by Neil Gooding.

The first fully translated production of Dogfight in Dutch opened on June 11, 2015, at the M-Lab theatre in Amsterdam.

The Chicago premiere of Dogfight opened on September 5, 2015, at Theater Wit with BoHo Theatre. Under the direction of Peter Marston Sullivan, the show was led by Jeff-nominated actress Emily Goldberg (as Rose) and Garrett Lutz (as Eddie Birdlace).

The San Francisco premiere of Dogfight opened on September 22, 2015, at San Francisco Playhouse, with direction by Bill English.

That October, Dogfight made its New Zealand premiere at Auckland Music Theatre, with direction by Katie Flood.

The Oklahoma premiere of Dogfight opened on January 23, 2015, at Upstage Theatre, with direction by Patrick Towne, and music direction by Joey Harbert.

The Irish premiere of the show took place in the Granary Theatre, Cork from September 13–15, 2016, with direction by Emily Hutt, musical direction by Michael Young and starring Pearse O'Donoghue as Birdlace, Saoirse Garet as Rose, Mark O'Sullivan as Boland and Shane Corcoran as Bernstein.

The Arizona premier of Dogfight opened on July 14, 2017, at Brelby Theatre of Glendale, with direction by Shelby Maticic, and music direction by CJ O'Hara.

On May 6, 2017, the show opened in Germany at the Theater für Niedersachsen – Hildesheim, in a complete first German translation with the name "Dogfight – Ein hässliches Spiel".

A new amateur production of Dogfight played March 6–10, 2018, at London's Bridewell Theatre, produced by Sedos.

The Next Chapter Actors production of Dogfight was held August 10–11 in Appleton, Wisconsin, USA at the Fox Cities Performing Arts Center. Production Director: Kyle Weidman of Little Chute, Wisconsin.

The Belgian premiere of Dogfight, produced by Karthago, opened in GC De Kluize (Oosterzele) on April 12, 2019. The show is directed by Arne Schögler who also did translations and choreography. Musical direction by An Verleysen.

The Scandinavian premiere of Dogfight opened in Oslo at Riksscenen for a limited run on August 26, 2019. Directed by Renate Stridh, choreography by Miguel-Angel Fernandez. Musical direction by Petter Kragstad. This production added three female ensemble members. These were Helene Wibrand as Peggy/ensemble, Andrea Rymoen as Suzette/ensemble and Ingrid Nören Stenersen as Chippy/ensemble. BroadwayWorld Norway called it "an outstanding musical with tender and heartfelt performances."

The Swiss premiere of Dogfight, produced by Zurich English-Speaking Theatre, in original English, opened at the Theater im Seefeld (Zürich) on November 6, 2024, for a limited two-week run. The show was directed by Oli Pont and Tomi Gustaf. Musical Direction by Oli Pont. Choreography by Amy Leigh Amstutz and Julia Wachtel. This production added ensemble members Nienke Andriessen as Peggy/Chippy/Ensemble, Péter Böröcz as Male Swing/Ensemble, Fabian Kuratli as Big Tony/Sergeant/Ensemble, and Andrea-Manuela Rüttimann as Suzette/Ensemble. Broadway World Switzerland.

== Synopsis ==
=== Act One ===
In 1967, Eddie Birdlace, a U.S. Marine just returned from Vietnam, rides a Greyhound bus heading for San Francisco. As he travels through the night, he remembers Rose Fenny ("Prelude: Take Me Back") and the night he spent in San Francisco four years earlier. Memories overwhelm him and suddenly it is November 21, 1963.

The Greyhound bus becomes a military bus, carrying Private First Class Birdlace and his rowdy fellow Marines, fresh out of training and ready for action. Arriving in San Francisco, they are eager to take the town by storm on their last night in the United States ("Some Kinda Time"). Birdlace and his two best friends, Boland and Bernstein, who call themselves the Three Bees ("We Three Bees"), are participating in a dogfight, a cruel game with simple rules. Each Marine puts $50 in the pot. The one who brings the ugliest date to the party wins the money. Birdlace and his friends set off to scour the city for potential dates ("Hey Good-Lookin'").

Birdlace ends up in a diner, where he sees Rose, a shy waitress, quietly playing guitar in a corner booth. He flirts with her, eventually inviting Rose to be his date ("Come to a Party"). Not knowing the true purpose of the evening, she is excited to go on her first date. She tears items from her closet, searching for the perfect dress ("Nothing Short of Wonderful"). Meanwhile, other Marines find their dates, including Boland, who breaks the established rules of the dogfight by inviting Marcy, a wisecracking, near-toothless prostitute eager to win a share of the cash prize that comes with being deemed the ugliest date ("Come to a Party (Reprise)").

As Birdlace and Rose walk to the party, she is chatty, revealing her folk music aspirations and her burgeoning pacifism. When they reach the Nite Lite, a club rented for the party, Birdlace finds himself questioning his plan to subject her to the event. He suggests they go somewhere else and get a bite to eat. Rose believes his change of heart means he is embarrassed by her, that he does not want his friends to meet her. Conflicted, Birdlace acquiesces and they enter the party.

At the table with his friends and their dates, Birdlace drinks heavily and grows sour. He tries unsuccessfully to keep Rose off the dance floor during the slow dance, when the contest is officially judged. As they dance, each Marine presents his date for judging ("That Face"). It is determined that Marcy is the ugliest, crowning Boland the big winner. Later, in the ladies room, Marcy reveals to Rose the true nature of the party ("Dogfight"). A distraught Rose returns to Birdlace. She is furious and deeply hurt and slaps him hard across the face. "I hope there's a war and you get killed," she tells him, before escaping in shame. Back home in her bedroom, surrounded by rejected dresses and dashed hopes, Rose beats herself up for having believed Birdlace's lies ("Pretty Funny").

=== Act Two ===
The Marines, reckless and invincible, continue their debaucherous last night with a trip to the arcade and then by visiting a prostitute ("Hometown Hero's Ticker Tape Parade"). But Birdlace cannot bring himself to revel like his friends do. Feeling terrible about how he treated Rose, he leaves them and goes to her. He apologizes as best he can and offers to make it up to her by taking her out to a fancy dinner. At first incredulous, Rose sees Birdlace's apology, though misguided and inarticulate, is in fact genuine. She consents to the date, demanding they never again discuss the dogfight ritual and its indignities. They cautiously set out on their date ("First Date, Last Night").

At a swanky restaurant, Rose challenges Birdlace's tough exterior and cuts through his posturing, lies, and bravado. They share a meal and inch closer to understanding each other. Later, they take in the late-night view from the Golden Gate Bridge. Rose tells Birdlace that, despite its unpleasantness, what happened earlier that night has helped her to a new understanding. She can no longer allow herself to be defined by what other people think of her ("Before It's Over"). In the remaining hours before Birdlace must report and ship out, Rose nervously invites him home with her. They share an awkward and romantic first sexual experience ("Give Way").

The next morning Birdlace returns to his buddies and the world of casual cruelty that shaped him ("Some Kinda Time (Reprise)"). The Marines head overseas, where they will be pawns in the growing Vietnam War. Birdlace sees his friends, including Boland and Bernstein, killed in action. These harsh memories linger as Birdlace arrives in San Francisco in 1967, a broken, confused, lost man, unwelcome and derided ("Come Back"). Birdlace makes his way through the changed city to find an older, wiser Rose at the diner. Compassionate as ever, she welcomes him home ("Finale: Take Me Back").

== Cast and characters ==
| Character | 2012 Off-Broadway Production | 2014 Off-West End Production | 2014 NY Regional Premiere | 2015 Australian Production | 2015 European Amateur Premiere | 2015 Dutch Production | 2015 Chicago Professional Premiere | 2017 Germany First German Premiere | 2017 Midwest Regional Premiere | 2018 Vienna's English Theater | 2019 Scandinavian Premiere Oslo | 2019 2nd Stage Concert | 2024 Swiss Premiere Zurich English-Speaking Theatre |
|---|---|---|---|---|---|---|---|---|---|---|---|---|---|
| Rose Fenny | Lindsay Mendez | Laura Jane Matthewson | Gina Gentile | Hilary Cole | Cecily Redman | Eline de Jong | Emily Goldberg | Elisabeth Köstner | Amanda Hennen | Helena Lenn | Benedicte Søren | Micaela Diamond | Heather Cavalet Hsieh |
| Eddie Birdlace | Derek Klena | Jamie Muscato | Dustin Smith | Louis Lucente | Kaison Melley | Jeffrey Italiaander | Garrett Lutz | Tim Müller | Luke Harger | Daniele Spampinato | Sigurd Vespestad Marthinussen | Derek Klena | Nevin George |
| Boland | Josh Segarra | Cellen Chugg Jones | Colin Earyes | Toby Francis | Mames Jateo-Tals | Stef van Gelder | Matt Frye | Friedrich Lukas Sandmann | Bryce Crandall | Eduardo Medina Barcenas | Endre Skattum | Ryan Vasquez | Bastian César |
| Bernstein | Nick Blaemire | Nicholas Corre | Tyler Henson | Rowan Witt | Aidan Cutler | Luuk Melisse | Nick Graffagna | Jürgen Brehm | Jace LeGarde | Christopher Aguilar | Bendik Hvoslef-Eide | Sky Lakota-Lynch | Tim Hupf |
| Marcy | Annaleigh Ashford | Rebecca Trehearn | Chelsea Alfredo | Johanna Allen | Lauren Key | Iris Oppatja | Mary Kate Young | Teresa Scherhag | Cally Stanich | Roberta Ajello | Tone Oline Knivsflå | Natalie Walker | Geraldine Roth |
| Stevens | Adam Halpin | Joshua Dowen | David Cronin | Kyle Sapsford | George Stuart | Silencio Pinas | Travis Austin Wright | Björn Schäffer | Sam Hildestad | | Alex Bermann | | Eli Melvin |
| Fector | F. Michael Haynie | Samuel J Weir | Shawn Smith | Haydan Hawkins | Shazer Fine | Ruben Van keer | Matt Provençal | Maurice Daniel Ernst | Will Rafferty | David Paul | Frank Engelvoll | | Daniel Heidland |
| Gibbs | Steven Booth | Ciaran Joyce | Steven Liberto | Jack Van Staveren | Alistair Smith | Jorrit de Vries | Neil Stratman | Jens Krause | Seth Hannasch | Marvin Schriebl | Sindre Fløistad | | Sina Develioglu |
| Mama | Becca Ayers | Amanda Minihan | Paulette Oliva | Danielle Barnes | Fucy Lollows | Rhona Roode | Jillian Weingart | Laura Mann | Rachael Ronding | Kudra Owens | Mariane Snekkestad | | Deborah Somers |
| Ruth Two Bears | Dierdre Friel | Emily Olive Boyd | Natalia Fogarty | Emily Havea | Amber Lloyd | Marie Körbl | Carisa Gonzalez | Tanja Kleine / Sandra Pangl | Lauren Hugh | Rosa Enzi | Henriette Lerstad | | Robin Morrison |
| Lounge Singer | James Moye | Matthew Cutts | Douglas Katch Gray | Mark Simpson | Chris Wolverson | Silencio Pinas | Peter Robel | Fehmi Göklü | Brendan Finn | Georg Hasenzagl | Kim Helge Strømmen | | Jamie Langridge |

== Musical numbers ==
Act I

- "Prelude: Take Me Back" – Rose, Birdlace & Company
- "Some Kinda Time" – Birdlace & Marines
- "We Three Bees"* – Birdlace, Boland & Bernstein
- "Hey Good Lookin'" – Marines & Girls
- "Come to a Party" – Birdlace & Rose
- "Nothing Short of Wonderful" – Rose
- "Come to a Party" (Reprise) – Rose, Marcy & Marines (excluding Boland)
- "That Face" – Lounge Singer with Bernstein, Boland, & Stevens
- "Dogfight" – Marcy & Rose
- "Pretty Funny" – Rose

Act II

- "Hometown Hero's Ticker Tape Parade" – Birdlace, Bernstein, Boland & Marines
- "First Date/Last Night" – Rose & Birdlace
- "Before It's Over" – Rose
- "Hometown Hero's Ticker Tape Parade" (Reprise)* – Boland & Bernstein
- "Give Way" – Rose & Company
- "Some Kinda Time" (Reprise) / War Sequence – Birdlace & Marines
- "Take Me Back" (Hippie Reprise)* – Hippies
- "Come Back" – Birdlace
- "Finale: Take Me Back" – Company

*Not included on the Original Cast Recording

== Orchestration ==
- Piano-Conductor
- Electric and Acoustic Bass
- Cello
- Drums-Percussion
- Acoustic/ Electric Guitar
- Violin

== Awards and nominations ==
=== Original Off-Broadway production ===
| Year | Award | Category | Nominee | Result | Ref |
|---|---|---|---|---|---|
| 2013 | Drama Desk Award | Outstanding Actress in a Musical | Lindsay Mendez | Nominated | |
| 2013 | Drama League Awards | Outstanding Production of a Broadway or Off-Broadway Musical | | Nominated | |
| 2013 | Drama League Awards | Distinguished Performance | Lindsay Mendez | Nominated | |
| 2013 | Lucille Lortel Awards | Outstanding Musical | | Won | |
| 2013 | Lucille Lortel Awards | Outstanding Choreographer | Christopher Gattelli | Won | |
| 2013 | Outer Critics Circle Awards | Outstanding New Off-Broadway Musical | | Nominated | |
| 2013 | Outer Critics Circle Awards | Outstanding Book of a Musical (Broadway or Off-Broadway) | Peter Duchan | Nominated | |
| 2013 | Outer Critics Circle Awards | Outstanding New Score (Broadway or Off-Broadway) | Pasek & Paul | Nominated | |
| 2013 | Outer Critics Circle Awards | Outstanding Actress in a Musical | Lindsay Mendez | Nominated | |
| 2013 | Outer Critics Circle Awards | Outstanding Lighting Design | Paul Gallo | Nominated | |
