= A Play Is a Poem =

Collection of plays by Ethan Coen

- Written by: Ethan Coen
- Music by: Nellie McKay

Premiere
- Date: September 11, 2019
- Directed by: Neil Pepe

A Play Is A Poem is a collection of five one-act plays written by Oscar-winning screenwriter Ethan Coen, featuring original music written by Nellie McKay. The play had its world premiere at Center Theatre Group's Mark Taper Forum in 2019. The play began previews on September 11, 2019 and officially opened on September 21, 2019. The production played through October 13, 2019 and was set to begin performances at The Atlantic Theatre Company's Atlantic Stage 2 on May 14, 2020 but was postponed due to the COVID-19 pandemic.

== Productions ==
A Play Is A Poem made its world premiere at the Mark Taper Forum in Los Angeles on September 11, 2019, and officially opened on September 21, 2019. The world premiere production played through October 13, 2019 and was set to transfer to The Atlantic Theatre Company's Off-Broadway theater Atlantic Stage 2 and was set to begin performances on May 14, 2020 but was postponed due to the COVID-19 pandemic.

The play was written by screenwriter Ethan Coen and was directed by Neil Pepe with original music written by Nellie McKay. The show featured scenic design by Riccardo Hernández, costume design by Sarah Laux, sound design by Leon Rothenberg, hair and wig design by Charles G. LaPointe, and lighting design by Tony Award-winner Tyler Micoleau.

== Cast ==
Character	World Premiere (2019)
Cal/Cabbie	Max Casella
Wes/Ed Curtin/Joey Falcone	Joey Slotnick
Gary Allen/Don Baines	CJ Wilson
Arthur Threadgill/Jerry Sterling	Saul Rubinek
Lindy/Dorothy	Micaela Diamond
LuAnne/Musician	Nellie McKay
Johnny Branco/Movie Executive	Peter Jacobson
Carter/The Writer	Sam Vartholomeos
Gadsen/Steve Tudik	Ro Boddie
The Wife	Miriam Silverman
Lou Wald	Jason Kravits
