= Significant Other (play) =

2015 play by Joshua Harmon

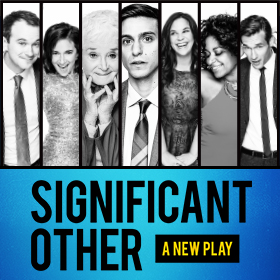
- Original language: English
- Written by: Joshua Harmon
- Characters: 7
- Genre: Comedy / Drama
- Setting: Present-day New York City

Premiere
- Date: 2015 Off-Broadway; 2017 Broadway
- Official website

Significant Other is an American play written by Joshua Harmon, which premiered Off-Broadway in 2015, followed by a Broadway production at the Booth Theatre in Spring 2017.

== Productions ==
The play was produced Off-Broadway by the Roundabout Theatre Company at the Laura Pels Theatre. The play premiered on May 16, 2015, in previews, officially on June 18, and closed on August 16, 2015. Directed by Trip Cullman, the cast featured Gideon Glick as Jordan, with John Behlmann, Sas Goldberg, Lindsay Mendez, Carra Patterson, Luke Smith, and Academy Award nominee Barbara Barrie, in her return to the stage at age 84.

The play transferred to Broadway on February 14, 2017 (which the production billed as "Singles Awareness Day"), and it officially opened on March 2 at the Booth Theatre. The Off-Broadway cast and creative team remained intact, with Rebecca Naomi Jones replacing Carra Paterson in the role of Vanessa. It marked the Broadway debuts for both playwright Harmon and director Cullman. The production ended its limited Broadway engagement on April 23, 2017, after a run of 79 performances. The Broadway production was filmed by New York Public Library for the Performing Arts at Lincoln Center's Theatre on Film and Tape Archive. The production team included: Scenic Design by Mark Wendland, Costume Design by Kaye Voyce, Lighting Design by Japhy Weideman, and Sound Design by Daniel Kluger.

The production was staged at the Fugard Theatre in Cape Town, South Africa with the following cast: Gabriel Meltz, Dominique Maher, Lesoko Seabe, Lucy Tops, Michèle Maxwell, Roberto Kyle and Ryan de Villiers. The production was directed by Greg Karvellas

The play is currently licensed to professional and amateur theaters through Samuel French. Prior to its Broadway run, it was produced by the SpeakEasy Stage Company in Boston, Massachusetts, from September to October 2016. Harmon's previous play, the comedy Bad Jews, was one of the most-produced plays in America in the 2014–2015 season.

== Premise ==
The play concerns the lives of four friends in their late 20s and their search for relationships in 21st century New York City. Playwright Joshua Harmon explained the premise by saying: “How do you make life work for yourself when you feel that you’re not living the life you’re supposed to be living or want to be living? And how do you deal with that when the changes that you need to make are in some ways outside of your control?”

== Reception ==
The New York Times theater critic Charles Isherwood gave the play a rave review in its Off-Broadway premiere, calling it "an absolutely wonderful new play. Entirely delightful, richly funny and heart-stirring." The play was included in The New York Times Top Ten Productions of 2015.

The CurtainUp reviewer wrote "Harmon has once again proved himself to be a wonderful wordsmith and astute chronicler of the quandaries faced by the millenial [sic] generation."

When reviewing a November 2017 production of the play produced by About Face Theatre Company in Chicago, Chicago Tribune critic Chris Jones wrote, "Significant Other is both a good night out — a show ideal for a Friday night with pals after a few drinks — and a quite sophisticated exploration of the complex and changing dynamic between gay men and the women who love them. A black comedy about a painful transition that hits many of us urbanites in our late 20s or early 30s and goes a long way toward explaining why weddings can be such fraught affairs for anyone stuck in a tux or matching crinoline."
