= Drama Desk Award for Outstanding Lead Performance in a Musical =

Theatre award

- Awarded for: Outstanding Lead Performance in a Musical
- Location: New York City
- Country: United States
- Presented by: Drama Desk Award
- First award: 2023
- Currently held by: Joshua Henry and; Caissie Levy, Ragtime; (2026)
- Website: dramadesk.org

The Drama Desk Award for Outstanding Lead Performance in a Musical is an annual award presented by Drama Desk in recognition of achievements in theatre across collective Broadway, off-Broadway and off-off-Broadway productions in New York City.

From 1955 to 1974, acting awards were given only for lead performances, without making distinctions between roles in plays and musicals, nor between actors and actresses. From 1975 to 2022, acting awards were presented in eight categories: separate categories by gender; further divided by lead or featured performer; producing four acting awards each for plays and musicals.

In 2023, the Drama Desk organization announced that, starting with that year's awards, the eight acting categories had been retired and replaced with four gender neutral categories with twice the winners and nominees: separate categories by lead or featured performer; producing two acting categories each for plays and musicals. The former awards for Outstanding Actor in a Musical and Outstanding Actress in a Musical were merged to create this Outstanding Lead Performance in a Musical category.

== Winners and nominees ==
Key

and bold indicates the winner.

=== 2020s ===
| Year | Actor | Title | Character | Ref. |
2023
| 2023 | **Annaleigh Ashford** | **Sweeney Todd: The Demon Barber of Fleet Street** | **Mrs. Lovett** | |
| 2023 | **J. Harrison Ghee** | **Some Like It Hot** | **Jerry/Daphne** | |
| 2023 | Nicholas Barasch | The Butcher Boy | Francie Brady | |
| 2023 | Sara Bareilles | Into the Woods | The Baker's Wife | |
| 2023 | Andrew Burnap | Camelot | King Arthur | |
| 2023 | Micaela Diamond | Parade | Lucille Frank | |
| 2023 | Andrew Durand | Shucked | Beau | |
| 2023 | Callum Francis | Kinky Boots | Lola | |
| 2023 | Jonathan Groff | Merrily We Roll Along | Franklin Shepard | |
| 2023 | Somi Kakoma | Dreaming Zenzile | Miriam Makeba | |
| 2023 | Lindsay Mendez | Merrily We Roll Along | Mary Flynn | |
| 2023 | Anna Uzele | New York, New York | Francine Evans | |
| 2024 | **Brian d'Arcy James** | **Days of Wine and Roses** | **Joe Clay** | |
| 2024 | **Maleah Joi Moon** | **Hell's Kitchen** | **Ali** | |
| 2024 | **Kelli O'Hara** | **Days of Wine and Roses** | **Kirsten Arnesen** | |
| 2024 | Andrew Durand | Dead Outlaw | Elmer McCurdy | |
| 2024 | Santino Fontana | I Can Get It for You Wholesale | Harry Bogen | |
| 2024 | Brody Grant | The Outsiders | Ponyboy Curtis | |
| 2024 | Liam Pearce | How to Dance in Ohio | Drew | |
| 2024 | Gayle Rankin | Cabaret | Sally Bowles | |
| 2024 | Ben Levi Ross | The Connector | Ethan Dobson | |
| 2024 | Ricky Ubeda | Illinoise | Henry | |
2025
| 2025 | **Audra McDonald** | **Gypsy** | **Rose** | |
| 2025 | **Jasmine Amy Rogers** | **Boop! The Musical** | **Betty Boop** | |
| 2025 | Tatianna Córdoba | Real Women Have Curves | Ana García | |
| 2025 | Darren Criss | Maybe Happy Ending | Oliver | |
| 2025 | Sutton Foster | Once Upon a Mattress | Princess Winnifred | |
| 2025 | Tom Francis | Sunset Blvd. | Joe Gillis | |
| 2025 | Jonathan Groff | Just in Time | Bobby Darin | |
| 2025 | Grey Henson | Elf | Buddy the Elf | |
| 2025 | Jeremy Jordan | Floyd Collins | Floyd Collins | |
| 2025 | Nicole Scherzinger | Sunset Blvd. | Norma Desmond | |
| 2025 | Helen J. Shen | Maybe Happy Ending | Claire | |
| 2025 | Jennifer Simard | Death Becomes Her | Helen Sharp | |
2026
| 2026 | **Joshua Henry** | **Ragtime** | **Coalhouse Walker Jr.** | |
| 2026 | **Caissie Levy** | **Ragtime** | **Mother** | |
| 2026 | Nicholas Christopher | Chess | Anatoly Sergievsky | |
| 2026 | Micaela Diamond | The Seat of Our Pants | Sabina | |
| 2026 | Luke Evans | The Rocky Horror Show | Frank-N-Furter | |
| 2026 | Dulé Hill | Lights Out: Nat “King” Cole | Nat "King" Cole | |
| 2026 | Amber Iman | Goddess | Nadira | |
| 2026 | Brian Quijada | Mexodus | Carlos | |
| 2026 | Nygel D. Robinson | Mexodus | Henry | |
| 2026 | Matt Rodin | Beau the Musical | Ace | |
| 2026 | Sam Tutty | Two Strangers (Carry a Cake Across New York) | Dougal Todd | |
| 2026 | Brandon Uranowitz | Ragtime | Tateh | |

== Statistics ==
=== Multiple nominations ===
2 nominations

- Andrew Durand
- Jonathan Groff
- Micaela Diamond

== See also ==
- Outer Critics Circle Award for Outstanding Lead Performer in a Broadway Musical
- Outer Critics Circle Award for Outstanding Lead Performer in an Off-Broadway Musical
- Lucille Lortel Award for Outstanding Lead Performer in a Musical
