= Lindsay Mendez =

American actress and singer

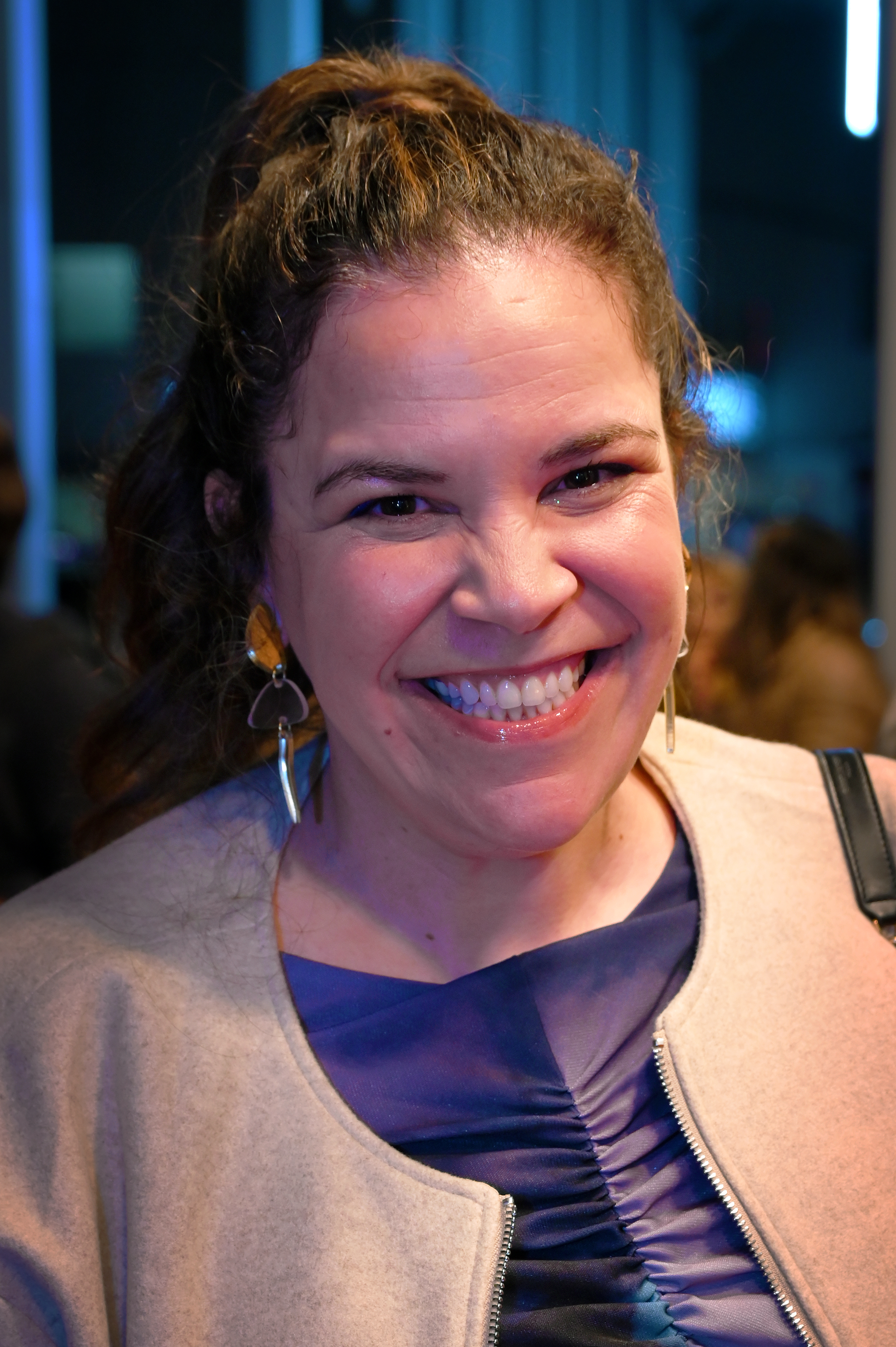
- Mendez in 2025
- Born: March 1, 1983 (age 43)
- Occupations: Actress, singer
- Years active: 2004–present
- Known for: All Rise, Wicked, Dogfight, Band Geeks, 21 Chump Street, Godspell, Grease, Carousel, 35MM, Merrily We Roll Along, Actor Therapy NYC
- Spouses: Michael Borth (m. 2008; div. 2014) Philip Wakefield (m. 2016; div. 2021) J. Alex Brinson (m. 2024)
- Children: 2
- Awards: Tony Award for Best Featured Actress in a Musical (for Carousel)

Lindsay Michelle Mendez (born March 1, 1983) is an American actress and singer, best known for her work in American musical theatre. She won the 2018 Tony Award for Best Featured Actress in a Musical for her performance as Carrie Pipperidge in a Broadway revival of Carousel. Her other credits on Broadway include Elphaba in Wicked (performing during the production's tenth anniversary), Godspell, and Jan in Grease. Mendez starred alongside Jonathan Groff and Daniel Radcliffe in the first Broadway revival of Merrily We Roll Along, which opened to critical acclaim on Broadway in October 2023.

From September 2019 to November 2023, Mendez co-starred on the CBS drama series All Rise as court stenographer Sara Castillo.

== Early life and career ==
Mendez grew up in Norwalk, California. Her father is of Mexican descent and her mother is of Russian Jewish ancestry. Her brother, Michael Mendez, is also a Broadway performer. She played Lizzie in a preview of A Little More Alive, written by Nick Blaemire, in Kansas City. Other credits include roles in The Marvelous Wonderettes, 35MM, Jacques Brel is Alive and Well and Living in Paris, and Princesses.

She made her Broadway debut in 2007 as part of the second Broadway revival of the musical Grease. She appeared in “Spare Some Change: NYC Artists for Barack Obama” directed by Ryan Mekenian in 2008 alongside Shaina Taub, Carrie Manolakos, Joe Iconis, Seth Rudetsky, & Celia Keenan-Bolger.

In 2012, Mendez appeared opposite Derek Klena in the off-Broadway musical Dogfight as Eddie and Rose, and from May 2013 in Wicked as Fiyero and Elphaba respectively. She was nominated for her role as Rose in Dogfight for the 2013 Drama League Award for Distinguished Performance, the 2013 Drama Desk Award for Outstanding Actress in a Musical, and the 2013 Outer Critics Circle Award for Outstanding Actress in a Musical. Mendez and Klena frequently perform together at the Broadway supper club 54 Below. They released a jazz album entitled This Time in 2013. Mendez also sings jazz and blues at other cabarets and dining clubs with pianist Marco Paguia.

While performing in Wicked, Mendez filmed a series of video blogs for Broadway.com entitled "Fly Girl: Backstage at Wicked with Lindsay Mendez", giving an inside look at the smash musical, including interviews with current cast members, glimpses of costumes, sets, props, and how Mendez herself was transformed into the musical's protagonist, Elphaba, the green-skinned girl who becomes the Wicked Witch of the West.

Mendez, along with composer Ryan Scott Oliver, founded and runs Actor Therapy: a five-week training experience for young actors in NYC.

In 2014, Mendez played Naomi Rodriguez in Lin Manuel Miranda's one-act musical 21 Chump Street and then in 2015, Laura in the play Significant Other.

In early 2016 she was set to star in the Broadway premiere of the musical Nerds alongside Rory O'Malley, Patti Murin and others. The show was cancelled during a rehearsal session two weeks before the first preview due to not having the financial resources for a Broadway mount.

Mendez played Carrie in the 2018 Broadway revival of Carousel, for which she won the Tony Award for Best Featured Actress in a Musical. The production also starred Jessie Mueller and Joshua Henry.

In the 2022 she played Mary Flynn in the off-Broadway revival of Merrily We Roll Along at New York Theater Workshop alongside Daniel Radcliffe and Jonathan Groff as well as former Wicked co-star Katie Rose Clarke. Mendez reprised the role in 2023 in the first Broadway revival of Merrily We Roll Along. She received a second nomination for the Tony Award for Best Featured Actress in a Musical for her performance.

Mendez had a main role as a court reporter on the legal drama series All Rise which ran from 2019 to 2023. She appeared in the Ryan Murphy produced anthology series American Sports Story.

== Personal life ==
Mendez has one daughter named Lucy from a previous relationship. Mendez married her All Rise co-star J. Alex Brinson in April 2024 in Central Park. The ceremony included Merrily castmates Jonathan Groff as the officiant and Daniel Radcliffe as the ring bearer. Their daughter Ruby Beck Brinson was born on September 19, 2024.

== Theatre ==
Year	Title	Role	Notes
2004	Princesses	Dena	Reading
2006	Princesses	Dena	Reading
2006	Go the Distance, and the Lyrics of David Zippel	Performer	Concert
2007–08	Grease	Jan	Broadway
2008	Princesses	Dena	Regional
2008	Footloose		Regional
2009	The Marvelous Wonderettes	Betty Jean (replacement)	Off-Broadway
2009	Everyday Rapture	Performer	Off-Broadway
2009	Band Geeks!		Regional
2009	Rated RSO; The Music and Lyrics of Ryan Scott Oliver	Performer	Concert
2010	35MM: A Musical Exhibition	Performer	Concert
2010	The Trouble with Doug		Regional
2010	Everyday Rapture	Mennonite/Dance Captain	Broadway
2011	Jacques Brel is Alive and Well and Living in Paris		Regional
2012	Dogfight	Rose Fenny	Off-Broadway
2011–12	Godspell	"Bless The Lord" Performer	Broadway
2013	Footloose		Regional
2013–14	Wicked	Elphaba (replacement)	Broadway
2014	A Little More Alive	Lizzie	Regional
2014	21 Chump Street	Naomi Rodriguez	Regional
2014	The Winter's Tale	Hermione	Off-Broadway
2015	Significant Other	Laura	Off-Broadway
2016	Nerds	Myrtle	Reading
2016	35MM: A Musical Exhibition	Performer	Concert
2016	The Rose Tattoo	Folk Singer/Giuseppina	Regional
2017	The Golden Apple	Helen	Encores!
2017	Significant Other	Laura	Broadway
2018	Carousel	Carrie Pipperidge	Broadway
2022–23	Merrily We Roll Along	Mary Flynn	Off-Broadway
2023–24	Merrily We Roll Along	Mary Flynn	Broadway
2026	Man of La Mancha	Aldonza / Dulcinea	Broadway Concert

== Filmography ==
Year	Title	Role	Notes	Ref.
2013	Smash	Herself	Episode: "The Transfer"	
2018	Murphy Brown	Rachel	Episode: "The Wheels on the Dog Go Round and Round"	
2019	Modern Family	Bel Air Black Widow	Episode: "SuperShowerBabyBowl"	
2019	Helpsters	Doctor Devin	Episode: "Rita Reader / Cody Gets a Cold"	
2019	Elementary	Dr. Angela Hardy	Episode: "The Latest Model"	
2019–2023	All Rise	Sara Castillo	58 episodes	
2021	Station 19	Lawyer	Episode: "A House Is Not a Home"	
2024	American Sports Story	Tanya Singleton	8 episodes	
2025	Elsbeth	Officer Grace Hackett	2 episodes	
2025	Law & Order: Special Victims Unit	Attorney Andrea Vargas	Episode: "Feed the Craving"	
2025	The American Revolution	Catharine Macaulay (voice)	3 episodes	
2025	Merrily We Roll Along	Mary Flynn	Live stage recording of musical	

== Discography ==
Year	Title	Description
2008	Grease	New Broadway Cast Recording
2009	New York City Christmas	ASTEP Benefit album
2010	Everyday Rapture	Original Broadway Cast Recording
2011	Godspell	The New Broadway Cast Recording
2012	35MM: A Musical Exhibition	Original Cast Recording
2013	This Time	with Marco Paguia
2013	Kerrigan-Lowdermilk Live	
2013	Dogfight	Original Cast Recording
2013	"Circus"	from I Could Use a Drink: The Songs of Drew Gasparini
2014	21 Chump Street – The Musical	EP
2018	Carousel	Broadway Cast Recording
2018	Band Geeks: A New Musical	Studio Cast Recording
2018	The Other Josh Cohen: A Musical With Songs	Studio Cast Recording
2019	Three Points of Contact	Ryan Scott Oliver
2023	Merrily We Roll Along	New Broadway Cast Recording

== Awards and nominations ==
Year	Award	Category	Work	Result
2013	Drama Desk Award	Outstanding Actress in a Musical	Dogfight	Nominated
2013	Drama League Award	Distinguished Performance	Dogfight	Nominated
2013	Outer Critics Circle Award	Outstanding Actress in a Musical	Dogfight	Nominated
2014	Broadway.com Audience Choice Award	Favorite Replacement (Female)	Wicked	Won
2017	Broadway.com Audience Choice Award	Favorite Featured Actress in a Play	Significant Other	Won
2018	Tony Award	Best Featured Actress in a Musical	Carousel	Won
2018	Drama Desk Award	Outstanding Featured Actress in a Musical	Carousel	Won
2018	Outer Critics Circle Award	Outstanding Featured Actress in a Musical	Carousel	Won
2019	Grammy Award	Best Musical Theater Album	Carousel	Nominated
2023	Drama Desk Award	Outstanding Lead Performance in a Musical	Merrily We Roll Along	Nominated
2023	Lucille Lortel Award	Outstanding Lead Performer in a Musical	Merrily We Roll Along	Nominated
2023	Outer Critics Circle Award	Outstanding Featured Performer in an Off-Broadway Musical	Merrily We Roll Along	Won
2024	Tony Award	Best Featured Actress in a Musical	Merrily We Roll Along	Nominated
2024	Drama League Award	Distinguished Performance	Merrily We Roll Along	Nominated
2024	Broadway.com Audience Award	Favorite Featured Actress in a Musical	Merrily We Roll Along	Won
2025	Grammy Award	Best Musical Theater Album	Merrily We Roll Along	Nominated
