= University of New South Wales Regiment =

Australian Army training unit

- Badge of the UNSW Regiment
- Active: 1 February 1952 – present
- Country: Australia
- Branch: Army Reserve
- Type: Training unit
- Role: Training Army Reserve officers and soldiers
- Part of: 8th Brigade
- Garrison/HQ: Kensington, Sydney
- Mottos: Caveat Qui Me Traducit "Let him, who traduces me beware" (Latin)
- Colors: Black and gold
- March: Quick—Blue Blood

Commanders
- Current commander: Lieutenant Colonel Andrew Bernie
- Colonel Commandant UNSWR / RNSWR: Major General Paul Brereton, AM RFD

Insignia
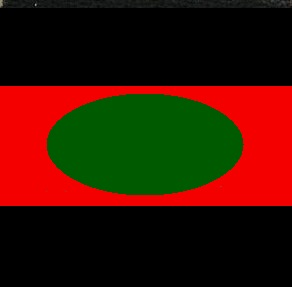
- Unit colour patch
- Abbreviation: UNSWR

The University of New South Wales Regiment (UNSWR) is, as of 2018, an Army Reserve Recruit training unit under the command of the 8th Brigade.

== Unit History ==
The University of New South Wales Regiment was founded as the New South Wales University of Technology Regiment in 1952, while Army Headquarters' approval to form the unit had been granted in July 1951. The new university and regiment were sensitive at the time to the standing it had in relation to the historic traditions of Sydney University, and thus the regiment was founded along the lines of the Sydney University Regiment. While the first regimental headquarters were in Mews Street, Ultimo from 1952, in 1954 the vice-chancellor of the university Philip Baxter, who had strongly supported the regiment's creation, provided it with a base on campus on High Street.

The regiment was renamed the University of New South Wales Regiment (UNSWR) when the university changed its name in 1958. In 1959, the regiment moved to a new specially-built site on Day Avenue on campus. The initial structure of UNSWR reflected an infantry battalion. The regiment affiliated with the university to attract candidates, who having served as privates, lance corporals, corporals and sergeants could be subsequently commissioned in the Army Reserve.

UNSWR became allied to a British Army regiment in 1964, through amalgamations this affiliation is now with the Princess of Wales's Royal Regiment (Queen's and Royal Hampshires). On 18 November 1977 UNSWR affiliated with the Canterbury, and Nelson-Marlborough and West Coast Regiment, a Territorial Force unit based on the South Island for soldiers serving part-time in the New Zealand Army.

In 1991, the structure changed to a training unit with the introduction of dedicated officer commissioning training. This ultimately became the First Appointment Course. In 2008, UNSWR transferred to under command of 8th Brigade and commenced delivery of soldier training for 8th Brigade. In 2011, the commitment to the First Appointment Course was reduced and UNSWR commenced delivery of training also to the soldiers of 5th Brigade. In addition to its ongoing involvement with the training of university students to become Officers in the Army Reserve, UNSWR also now delivers junior leader and soldier specialist training for university and TAFE students in the greater Sydney area

In 2018 UNSWR was directed by the Headquarters of the 2nd Division to assume responsibility for all recruit and initial employment training soldier management and training for the Army Reserve in NSW.

On 26 June 2018 all available and current NSW Army Reserve trainees were posted into the Regiment. This posting action involved nearly 850 soldiers, or over 10% of the 2nd Division's total soldier asset. As a result of this posting action, UNSWR became the third largest unit in the Australian Army.

From 2024, UNSWR along with 8 BDE transferred to Army's Forces Command and focused on soldier and driver training.

=== Regimental colours ===
The regiment was first presented with colours on 27 October 1963 on the UNSW Oval at Kensington by the Governor of New South Wales, Lieutenant General Sir Eric Woodward. New colours were presented at a Regimental Colours Parade on 22 August 1998 at Victoria Barracks, Paddington by the Governor General of Australia, Sir William Deane. When UNSW declined to house the old Regimental colours on campus, the Regiment gained permission to retire them in St Spyridon's Greek Orthodox Church, Kensington.

The Regiment maintains close ties to St Spyridon, supporting the church's Anzac Day ceremony each year, as well as the Sydney Boys High Cadet Unit.

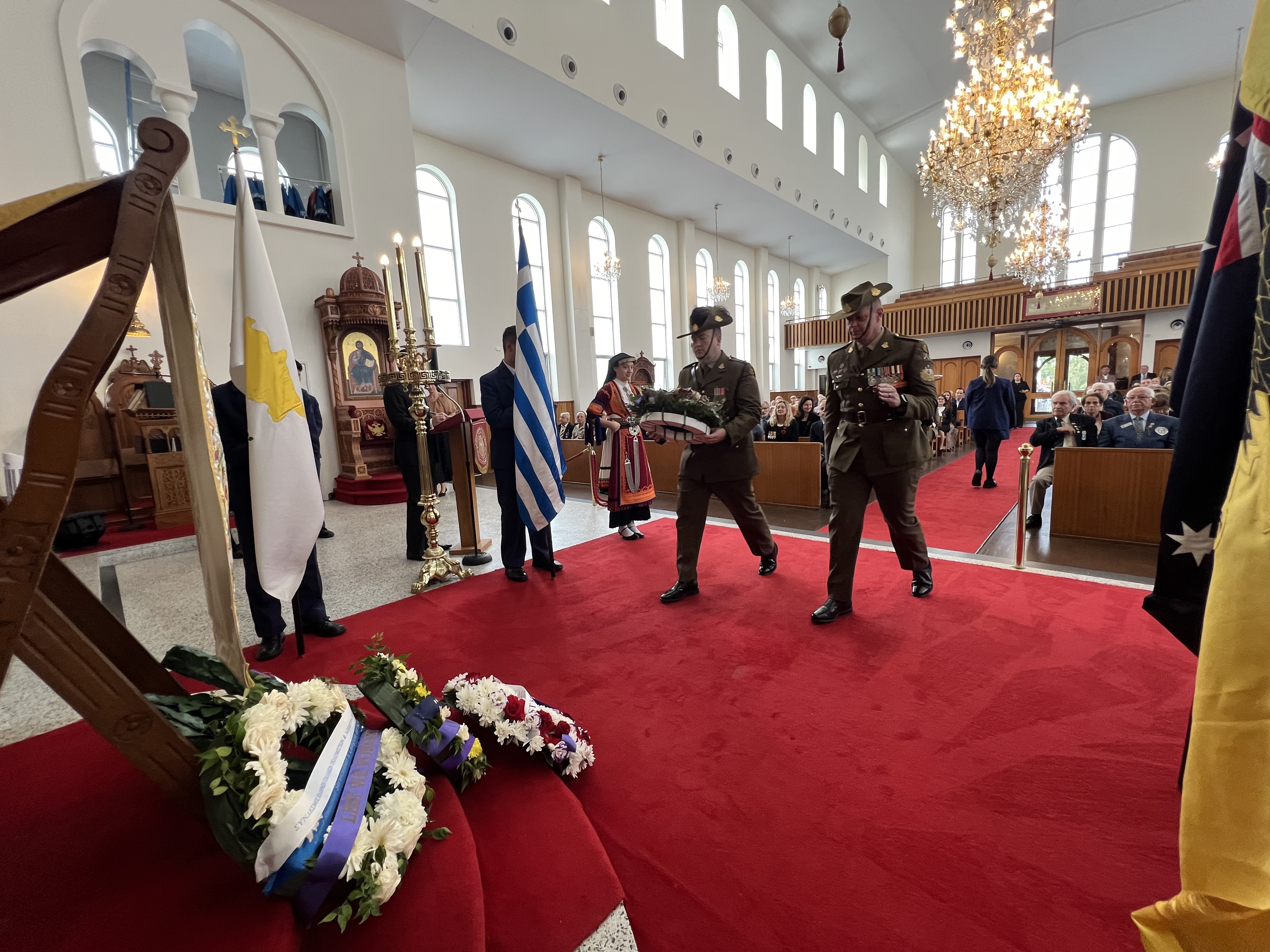
CO and RSM at the Street Spyridon 2024 Anzac Day service

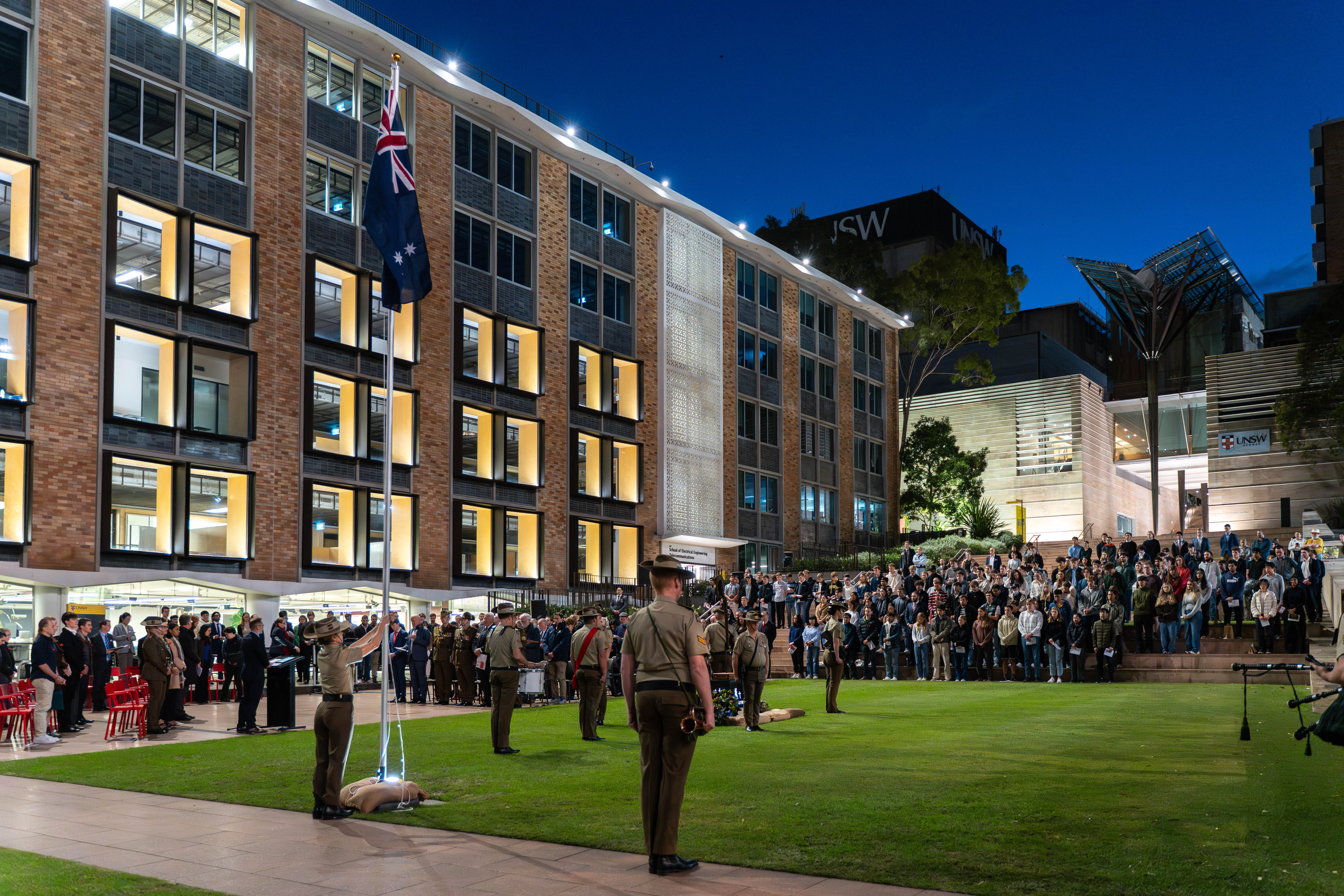

== Key personnel ==
The University of Technology Regiment honour guard being inspected by Governor Sir John Northcott at the first graduation ceremony of the university, 16 April 1955.

=== Commanding officers ===
The following officers served as commanders of the regiment:

- Lieutenant Colonel W. R Blunden (23 June 1952 – 11 February 1953)
- Lieutenant Colonel W. M. McGilvray ED (14 February 1953 – 23 September 1955)
- Lieutenant Colonel S. L. M. Eskell ED (24 September 1955 – 1 July 1958)
- Lieutenant Colonel J. McCarty MC, ED (2 July 1958 – 2 July 1959)
- Lieutenant Colonel K. L. Kesteven MC, ED (3 July 1959 – 31 August 1960)
- Lieutenant Colonel J. S. Whittle MBE, ED (1 September 1960 – 30 November 1962)
- Lieutenant Colonel K. W. Bromham ED (1 December 1962 – 1 December 1965)
- Lieutenant Colonel P. C. Parsonage ED (1 January 1966 – 28 September 1968)
- Lieutenant Colonel K. H. F. Fargher ED (30 September 1968 – 30 September 1970)
- Lieutenant Colonel B. N. Nunn ED (1 October 1970 – 31 March 1972)
- Lieutenant Colonel The Hon. M. F. Willis ED, MLC (1 April 1972 – 9 March 1975)
- Lieutenant Colonel W. B. Molloy ED (10 March 1975 – 1978)
- Lieutenant Colonel A H MacGregor MC, RFD (1978–1981)
- Lieutenant Colonel C. R. Hoeben AM RFD (1981–1984)
- Lieutenant Colonel M J Hough AM RFD ED ( 1984–1986)
- Lieutenant Colonel B A McGrath RFD (1986–1988)
- Lieutenant Colonel C J Dunston RFD (1 January 1988 – 1 February 1991)
- Lieutenant Colonel G M Tamsitt RFD (1991–1995)
- Lieutenant Colonel D J Deasey RFD (1995–1997)
- Lieutenant Colonel Ian A. Lalas RFD (1998–2000)
- Lieutenant Colonel John E. Fielding RFD (Feb 2000 – Feb 2002)
- Lieutenant Colonel D M Young RFD (Feb 2002-Feb 2004)
- Lieutenant Colonel Michael Abrahams (2004–2006)
- Lieutenant Colonel David Connery (2006–2007
- Lieutenant Colonel Stephen Fomiatti (2007–2008)
- Lieutenant Colonel P V Coleman RFD (2008–2011)
- Lieutenant Colonel Peter Docwra CSM (2011–2014)
- Lieutenant Colonel Alain Dunand (2014–2017)
- Lieutenant Colonel Mike Sommer (2017–2018)
- Lieutenant Colonel Damian Bushell (2019–2020)
- Lieutenant Colonel Garth Callender (2021–2022)
- Lieutenant Colonel Andrew Bernie (2023–2024)
- Lieutenant Colonel Craig Joce (2024- )

=== Honorary colonels ===
The following officers served as honorary colonel of the regiment:

- Colonel G. G. Hayman OBE, ED (24 December 1958 – 26 October 1961)
- Major General J. R. Stevenson CBE, DSO, ED (10 January 1963 – 16 May 1969)
- Major General A. D. Murchison MC, ED (10 January 1963 – 16 May 1969)
- Lieutenant General Sir Mervyn Brogan KBE, CB (4 October 1975 – 1979)
- Major General J. MacDonald AO, MBE, RFD, ED (5 October 1979 – 4 November 1985)
- Brigadier RSP Amos RFD, ED (1965–1991)
- Brigadier P. C. Parsonage RFD, ED (1991–1997)
- Lieutenant Colonel J C Southwell RFD, ED (1997–2000)
- Major General B A McGrath RFD (2000–2003)
- Major General the Hon Justice Clifton Hoeben AM, RFD (2003–2007)
- Colonel Sandy McGregor MC, RFD (2007–2013)
- Brigadier Paul Couch CSC RFD (1 July 2013–16)
- Major General Paul Brereton, AM RFD (2016 – )

== Notable former members ==
- Ted Pickering – NSW politician
- Darrell Duncan – Director General Health Reserves Army
- Brigadier Allan A. Murray CSM – Commander 8th Brigade 2012–2014

== Alliances ==
- United Kingdom – Princess of Wales's Royal Regiment (1964)
- New Zealand – Canterbury, and Nelson-Marlborough and West Coast Regiment (1977)

== See also ==
- Sydney University Regiment
