= Micaela Diamond =

American actress and singer

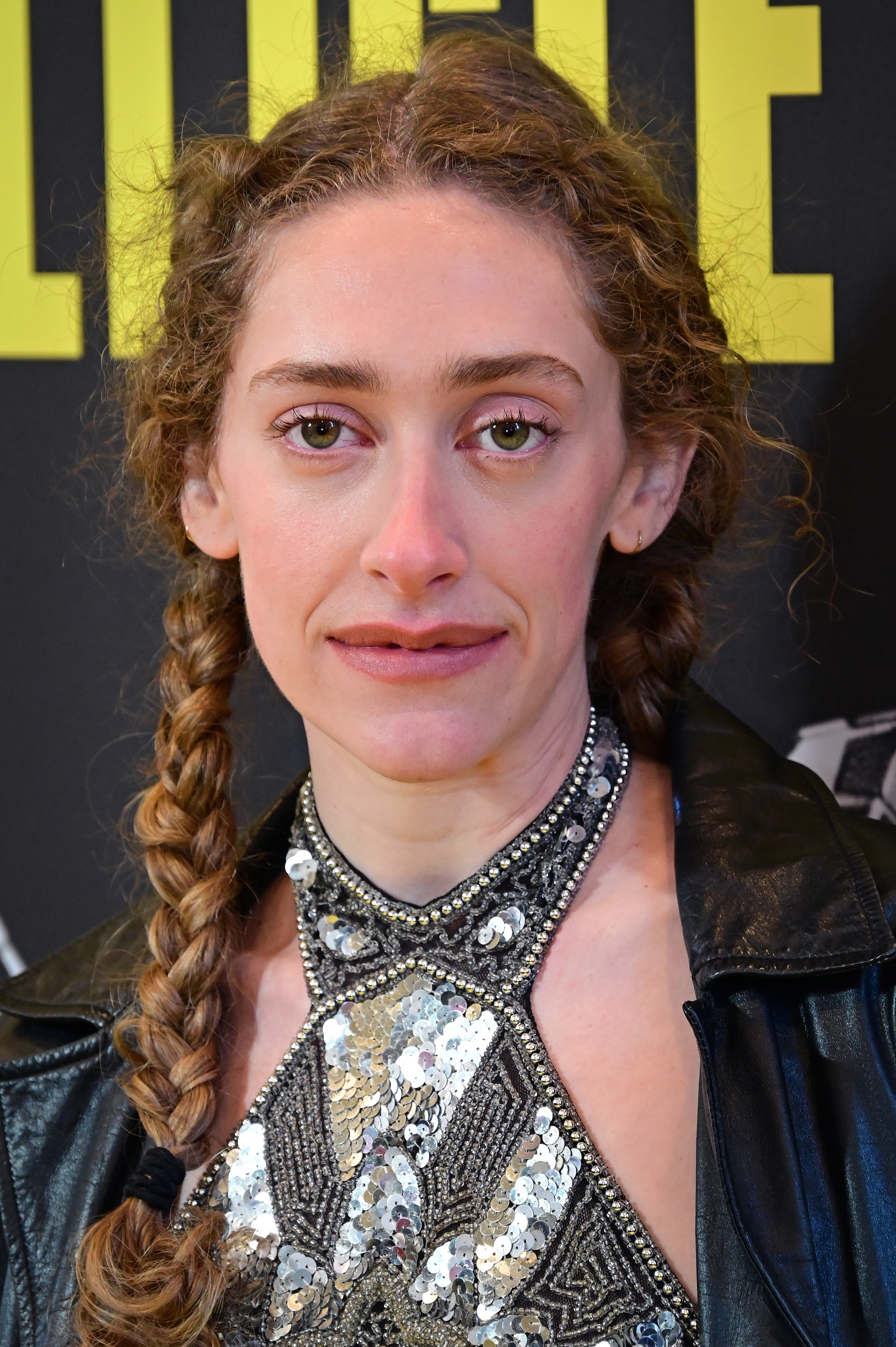
- Diamond in 2026
- Born: July 17, 1999 (age 27)
- Occupations: Actress; dancer; singer
- Years active: 2018–present

Micaela Diamond (born July 17, 1999) is an American actress and singer. She made her Broadway debut as Babe in The Cher Show (2018–2019). Diamond starred in the critically acclaimed Broadway revival of the musical Parade as Lucille Frank, a performance for which she was nominated for the 2023 Tony Award for Best Actress in a Musical and a Grammy Award for Best Musical Theatre Album.

== Early life and education ==
Micaela spent her early years in Margate, New Jersey. At the age of 11, she moved to New York City with her mother, Karen Diamond, to pursue a career in the performing arts. There, Diamond attended Fiorello H. LaGuardia High School.

In 2017, Diamond was accepted into the musical theatre program at Carnegie Mellon University. During a high school production, Gypsy, in which she played Louise, an agent saw her performance and signed her. She played Babe, the youngest version of Cher in The Cher Show, landing the role three days before she had planned to move to Carnegie Mellon for her freshman year.

== Career ==
Diamond made her professional debut in the musical television special of Jesus Christ Superstar Live in Concert on NBC as a featured member of the ensemble. She was also the understudy for Sara Bareilles' Mary Magdalene.

Diamond originated the role of Babe, the youngest version of Cher around the age of 7–19 in The Cher Show. Starring alongside Jarrod Spector, Teal Wicks, and Stephanie J. Block, she also appears on the musical cast album. On June 9, 2019, Diamond was named a 2019 Theatre World Awards honoree for her role as Babe in The Cher Show. Diamond was nominated for Best Breakout Broadway Performance of the Decade at the BroadwayWorld Theatre Fans' Choice Award for her performance in The Cher Show.

In 2019, Diamond originated the roles of Lindy and Dorothy in the world premiere of Ethan Coen's A Play Is a Poem at Los Angeles' Mark Taper Forum. The play ran from September 11 to October 13, 2019, and was scheduled to begin performances Off-Broadway at the Atlantic Theater Company's Atlantic Stage 2 in New York City beginning May 14, 2020, but was postponed due to the COVID-19 pandemic.

Diamond also originated the roles of Young Tori and Amelia in Williamstown Theatre Festival's world premiere production of Row which opened on July 17, 2021.

On May 17, 2022, it was announced that Diamond would play Lucille Frank opposite Ben Platt as Leo Frank in New York City Center's gala presentation production of Parade. Following their sold-out run at New York City Center, a limited Broadway transfer was announced on January 10, 2023, with Diamond and Platt continuing their roles as Lucille and Leo Frank. The revival began previews on February 21, 2023, opened March 16, 2023 at the Bernard B. Jacobs Theatre, and concluded on August 6, 2023. High demand for tickets on the first day of sale resulted in temporarily crashing the Telecharge ticket site, resulting in error messages and queues of an hour long. For her performance, Diamond was nominated for the 2023 Tony Award for Best Leading Actress in a Musical and for the 2024 Grammy Award for Best Musical Theatre Album.

Diamond originated and received acclaim for the role of Fritz, a covert revolutionary, in the 2023 Off-Broadway world premiere of Stephen Sondheim's final musical, Here We Are, an adaptation of two Luis Buñuel films.

On August 13, 2024, Diamond was announced as one of the cast members of the Ryan Murphy-produced FX-series Grotesquerie.

== Personal life ==
Diamond is in a relationship with actor Ben Ahlers.

== Theater credits ==
Year	Title	Role	Theatre	Director(s)	Ref.
2018	The Cher Show	Babe	Oriental Theatre	Jason Moore	
2018	Parade (workshop)	Lucille Frank	Roundabout Theatre Company	Michael Arden	
2018–19	**The Cher Show**	**Babe**	**Neil Simon Theatre**	Jason Moore	
2019	Dogfight (anniversary concert)	Rose	Second Stage Theatre	Gina Rattan	
2019	A Play Is A Poem	Lindy/Dorothy	Mark Taper Forum	Neil Pepe	
2020	Disenchanted (live stream)		Art Lab Productions	Meg Fofonoff	
2021	Row	Young Tori/Amelia	Clark Art Institute	Tyne Rafaeli	
2022	**Parade**	Lucille Frank	New York City Center	Michael Arden	
2023	**Parade**	Lucille Frank	**Bernard B. Jacobs Theatre**	Michael Arden	
2023–24	Here We Are	Fritz	The Shed	Joe Mantello	
2025	The Seat of Our Pants	Sabina	The Public Theater	Leigh Silverman	
2026	Oklahoma!	Laurey Williams	Carnegie Hall	Shuler Hensley	
2026	**Awake and Sing!**	Hennie Berger	**Samuel J. Friedman Theatre**	Tyne Rafaeli • Credits in bold indicate Broadway production(s)	

== Filmography ==
=== Film ===
Year	Title	Role	Ref.
2014	Imbalance	Featured Dancer	
2021	Tick, Tick... Boom!	Peggy	
TBA	Our Bodies & Other Shames	TBA	

=== Television ===
Year	Title	Role	Notes	Ref.
2018	Jesus Christ Superstar Live in Concert	Ensemble (u/s Mary Magdalene)	Television special	
2019	The Tonight Show Starring Jimmy Fallon	Herself	Episode: "Cher"	
2019	73rd Tony Awards	Performer	Television special	
2019–23	Today	Musical Guest	3 episodes	
2022	The Gilded Age	Shop Assistant	Episode: "A Long Ladder"	
2023	Up Here	Girl from Anthro	2 episodes	
2024–26	Elsbeth	Detective Edwards	7 episodes	
2024	Grotesquerie	Megan Duval	10 episodes	

== Awards and nominations ==
Year	Award	Category	Work	Result	Ref.
2019	Theatre World Award	Outstanding Debut Performance	The Cher Show	Honoree	
2020	BroadwayWorld Theatre Fans' Choice Award	Best Breakout Broadway Performance Of The Decade	The Cher Show	Nominated	
2023	Tony Award	Best Actress in a Musical	Parade	Nominated	
2023	Drama Desk Award	Outstanding Lead Performance in a Musical	Parade	Nominated	
2023	Drama League Award	Distinguished Performance	Parade	Nominated	
2023	Outer Critics Circle Award	Outstanding Lead Performer in a Broadway Musical	Parade	Nominated	
2024	Grammy Awards	Best Musical Theater Album	Parade	Nominated	
2026	Drama Desk Award	Outstanding Lead Performance in a Musical	The Seat of Our Pants	Nominated	
2026	Outer Critics Circle Award	Outstanding Lead Performer in an Off-Broadway Musical	The Seat of Our Pants	Nominated	
