= The Seat of Our Pants =

2025 musical

- Music: Ethan Lipton
- Lyrics: Ethan Lipton
- Basis: The Skin of Our Teeth by Thornton Wilder
- Premiere: October 23, 2025: The Public Theater, New York City
- Productions: 2025 Off-Broadway

The Seat of Our Pants is a musical adapted and written by Ethan Lipton, based on Thornton Wilder's 1942 comedy The Skin of Our Teeth. It opened on November 13, 2025, at The Public Theater in Lower Manhattan.

== Plot ==
The play, set in prehistoric suburban New Jersey, follows the Antrobus family—George, Maggie, and their children, Henry and Gladys—along with their maid, Sabina, as a wall of ice approaches, threatening their home. Their troubles only begin, as a flood and world war threaten their lives, exploring the nature of human errors and the cycle of destruction.

== Production history ==
The idea for The Seat of Our Pants originated more than a decade before its premiere. Jeremy McCarter, a longtime collaborator of The Public Theater, first proposed pairing Ethan Lipton’s musical sensibility with the Thornton Wilder’s comedy The Skin of Our Teeth, believing Lipton’s songwriting style to be a natural fit for Wilder’s themes. McCarter suggested the collaboration to Lipton, who responded with interest. Development of the project at the Public Theater began soon afterward and continued over the next ten years.

During this period, McCarter departed The Public Theater but has maintained a close relationship with the institution, including founding their Public Forum program. In the years following his initial involvement, he also became the literary executor of the Wilder estate. His early insight and ongoing support played a significant role in shaping the musical’s development.

The production premiered Off-Broadway at The Public Theater on November 13, 2025, starring Ruthie Ann Miles as Maggie Antrobus, Shuler Hensley as George Antrobus, Amina Faye as Gladys Antrobus, Damon Daunno as Henry Atrobus, Ally Bonino as Fortune Teller and Ruth E. Sternberg as Mr. Fitzpatrick. The production was extended and ran through December 7, 2025.

The musical received generally positive reviews, with The New York Times calling it "thoughtful, inventive, (and) maybe-not-yet-finished" and New York Theatre Guide lauded the cast as an "embarrassment of riches," with criticism for the show's third act.

The production was nominated for nine 2026 Drama Desk Awards, two Drama League Awards, two Lucille Lortel Awards and an Outer Critics Circle Award nomination for Diamond.

== Cast and characters ==
Characters	Off-Broadway, 2025
Doctor, Animal, Broadcast Official, Ensemble	Ben Beckley
Miss E. Muse, Fortune Teller, Animal	Ally Bonino
Moses, Turkey, Ensemble	Bill Buell
Henry Antrobus	Damon Daunno
Sabina	Micaela Diamond
Gladys Antrobus	Amina Faye
Announcer, Animal	Andy Grotelueschen
Mr. Antrobus	Shuler Hensley
Animal, Bingo Caller, Allison, Ensemble	Allison Ann Kelly
Telegram Boy, Homer, Animal, Ensemble	Michael Lepore
Miss M. Muse, Animal, Sharon, Ensemble.	Nat Lopez
Mrs. Antrobus	Ruthie Ann Miles
Mammoth, Miss T. Muse, Pelican, Animal, Ensemble	Geena Quintos
Dinosaur, Refugee, Dolphin, Larry, Ensemble	David Ryan Smith
Mr. Fitzpatrick	Ruth E. Sternberg

== Musical Numbers ==
Act I

- “The World Is Ending”
- “Sabina’s Suite”
- “Telegram”
- “Stuff It Down Inside”
- “Mama Mama”
- “Good People”
- “Into the Darkness”

Act II

- “Everybody Loves to Go to Conventions”
- “Come a Long Way”
- “Enjoy Yourselves”
- “5000 Years/Come a Long Way (Part 2)”
- “The Future (Part 1-3; Cirrhosis/Psst Keck/Rains)”
- “Cursed With Urges”
- “Family Fun”
- “Ordinary Girl (Part 1)”
- “How Uncomfortable (Part 1-2)”
- “Ordinary Girl (Part 2)”
- “Poisoned My World (Part 1-2)”
- “In This Bottle”

Act III

- “The War Is Over”
- “Ruin Everything”
- “Kingdom Come”
- “One Good Idea”
- “The Wonderful Thing About Ice Cream”
- “We’re a Disaster”

== Awards and nominations ==
Year	Award	Category	Nominee	Result	Ref.
2026	Drama Desk Award	Outstanding Musical		Nominated	
2026	Drama Desk Award	Outstanding Lead Performance in a Musical	Micaela Diamond	Nominated	
2026	Drama Desk Award	Outstanding Featured Performance in a Musical	Ruthie Ann Miles	Nominated	
2026	Drama Desk Award	Outstanding Direction of a Musical	Leigh Silverman	Nominated	
2026	Drama Desk Award	Outstanding Music	Ethan Lipton	Nominated	
2026	Drama Desk Award	Outstanding Lyrics	Ethan Lipton	Nominated	
2026	Drama Desk Award	Outstanding Book of a Musical	Ethan Lipton	Nominated	
2026	Drama Desk Award	Outstanding Orchestrations	Daniel Kluger	Nominated	
2026	Drama Desk Award	Outstanding Costume Design of a Musical	Kaye Voyce	Nominated	
2026	Drama League Award	Outstanding Production of a Musical		Nominated	
2026	Drama League Award	Outstanding Direction of a Musical	Leigh Silverman	Nominated	
2026	Lucille Lortel Award	Outstanding Lead Performer in a Musical	Ruthie Ann Miles	Nominated	
2026	Lucille Lortel Award	Outstanding Costume Design	Kaye Voyce	Nominated	
2026	Outer Critics Circle Award	Outstanding Lead Performer in an Off-Broadway Musical	Micaela Diamond	Nominated	
