= Garth Callender =

Australian soldier (born 1977)

Garth Charles Douglas Callender
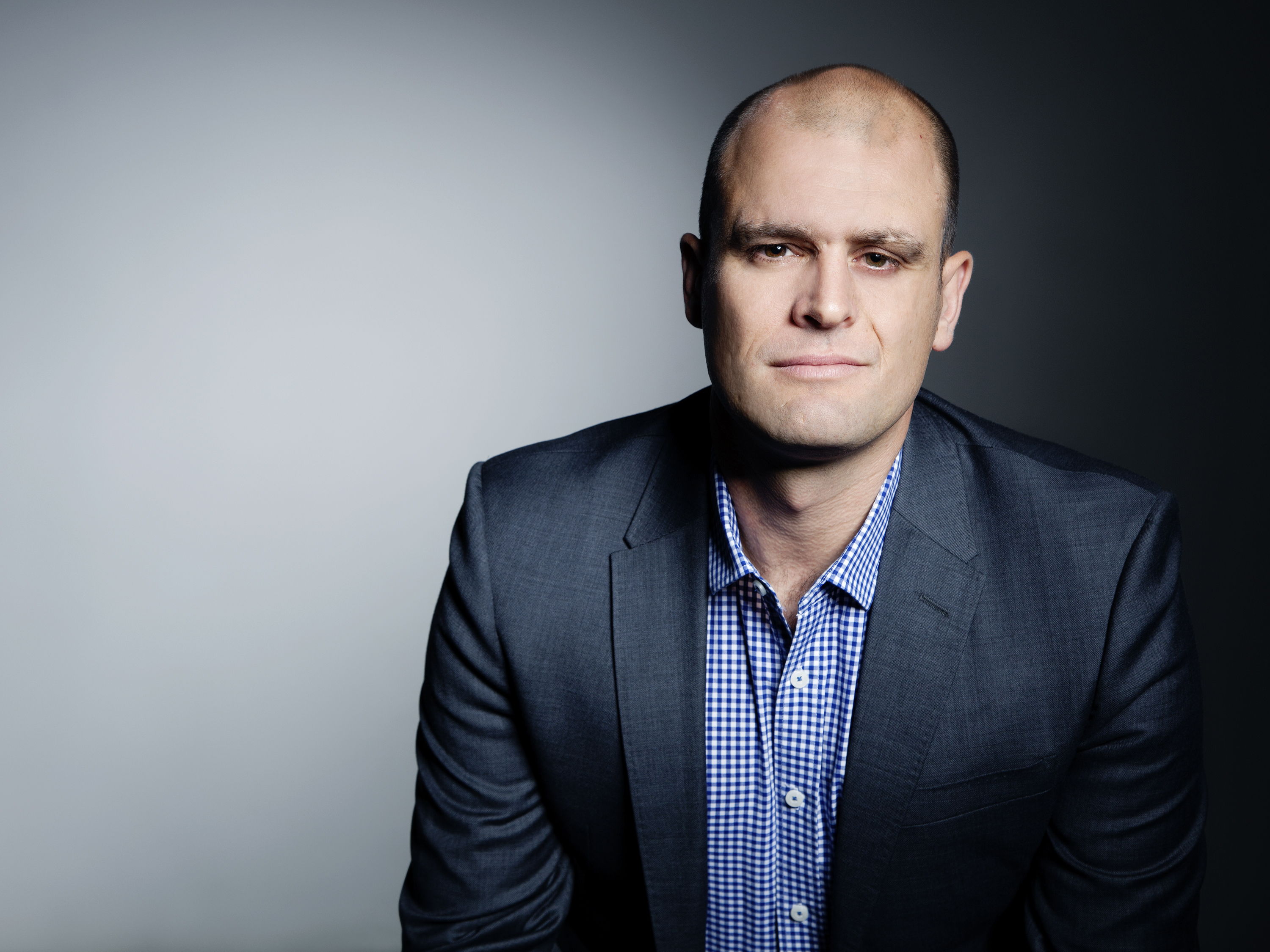
- Colonel Garth Callender c.2014
- Born: 10 February 1977 (age 49); Hornsby, New South Wales
- Military career
- Allegiance: Australia
- Branch: Australian Army
- Service years: 1996–
- Rank: Colonel
- Units: 2nd Cavalry Regiment. 2nd/14th Light Horse Regiment; Australian Counter IED Task Force; Combat Training Centre
- Commands: Cavalry Troop, SECDET V 2004; Australian Weapons Intelligence Team Afghanistan 2009–10; A Squadron, 2nd Cavalry Regiment 2012; University of New South Wales Regiment 2021-
- Conflicts: Iraq War; War in Afghanistan

Colonel Garth Callender is the author of After the Blast: An Australian Officer in Iraq and Afghanistan, published by Black Inc. in 2015.

He rose to prominence when in 2016 it was announced by the NSW Baird Government that he would spearhead the state's Veterans Employment Program.

He is CEO of Bravery Trust, working alongside Ambassadors Justin Langer AM, Kevin Sheedy AM and Dr Paul Alexander AO.

In January 2017 he was named patron of the Matthew Millhouse Salute, a charity event in honour of Trooper Matthew Millhouse, who died on 28 August 2015 from Young Onset Dementia, caused by a traumatic brain injury received from a bomb explosion in Iraq in 2004 in which both he and Garth were injured.

== Military career ==
Callender joined the Australian Army in 1996 as a Rifleman in the 6th Battalion, The Royal Australian Regiment. He graduated from the Royal Military College, Duntroon in 2001 to the Royal Australian Armoured Corps. His operational experience includes two deployments as part of the Australian Security Detachment – Baghdad; the first as a Cavalry Troop Leader in 2004, and the second as an Executive Officer in 2006. In 2004, as junior cavalry officer in the Australian Army, he was deployed to Iraq. Garth became Australia's first serious casualty in the war when his patrol was targeted in a roadside bomb attack.

After recovering from his injuries, Callender returned to Iraq in 2006 as second-in-command of the Australian Army's security detachment in Baghdad. His combat team suffered the death one of their own, Private Jake Kovco.

Over June 2009 to February 2010, Callender commanded the Weapons Intelligence Team in Uruzgan Province, Afghanistan. His team was successful as the first team to develop technical intelligence products to focus coalition intelligence collection, planning and operations. These reports proved pivotal in shaping the Australian Government’s understanding of incidents involving Australian casualties and defining policy regarding Australia’s commitment to Afghanistan.

He remains an active member of the Army Reserve.

== After the Blast ==
After the Blast: An Australian Officer in Iraq and Afghanistan is a memoir written by Garth Callender. The book follows the author through three operational deployments with the Australian Army over 2004 to 2010.

- The first tour was with the Australian Security Detachment in Baghdad when the author was badly wounded in an improvised explosive device attack on 25 October 2004.
- The second tour saw the author return to Baghdad in 2006. The story details several incidents including a rocket attack that injured four soldiers and a shooting incident which resulted in three Iraqi security guards wounded and one killed. Most notably the story details the shooting death of Private Jacob Kovco.
- The final section of the book follows the author to Uruzgan Province, Afghanistan over June 2009 to February 2010 where he commanded a weapons intelligence team.

After the Blast won the 2016 Nib Waverley Military History Literary Prize.

== Honours and awards ==

	Australian Active Service Medal	with 2 Clasps IRAQ 2003 and ICAT
	Afghanistan Medal	
	Iraq Medal	
Ribbon of the DLSM	Defence Long Service Medal	For 25 Years Service
	Australian Defence Medal	
	NATO Medal with ISAF Clasp	(NATO)
	Army Combat Badge	
	Australian Defence Force Commendation (Silver)	
	Australian Defence Force Commendation (Bronze)	
	Army Commendation (Bronze)	
