= Parade (musical) =

Musical with a book by Alfred Uhry and music and lyrics by Jason Robert Brown

- Broadway Playbill cover
- Music: Jason Robert Brown
- Lyrics: Jason Robert Brown
- Book: Alfred Uhry
- Basis: Historical events in Atlanta from 1913 to 1915
- Premiere: December 17, 1998: Vivian Beaumont Theater
- Productions: 1998 Broadway; 2000 US Tour; 2007 Off-West End; 2023 Broadway revival; 2025 US Tour
- Awards: Tony Award for Best Score; Tony Award for Best Book; Tony Award for Best Revival of a Musical

Parade is a musical with a book by Alfred Uhry and music and lyrics by Jason Robert Brown. The musical is a dramatization of the 1913 trial and imprisonment and 1915 lynching of Jewish American Leo Frank in Georgia.

The musical premiered on Broadway in December 1998 and won Tony Awards for Best Book and Best Original Score (out of nine nominations) and six Drama Desk Awards. After closing on Broadway in February 1999, the show has had a US national tour and a few professional productions in the US and UK. Its 2023 Broadway staging was nominated for six Tony Awards, winning two, including Best Revival of a Musical.

== Background and genesis ==
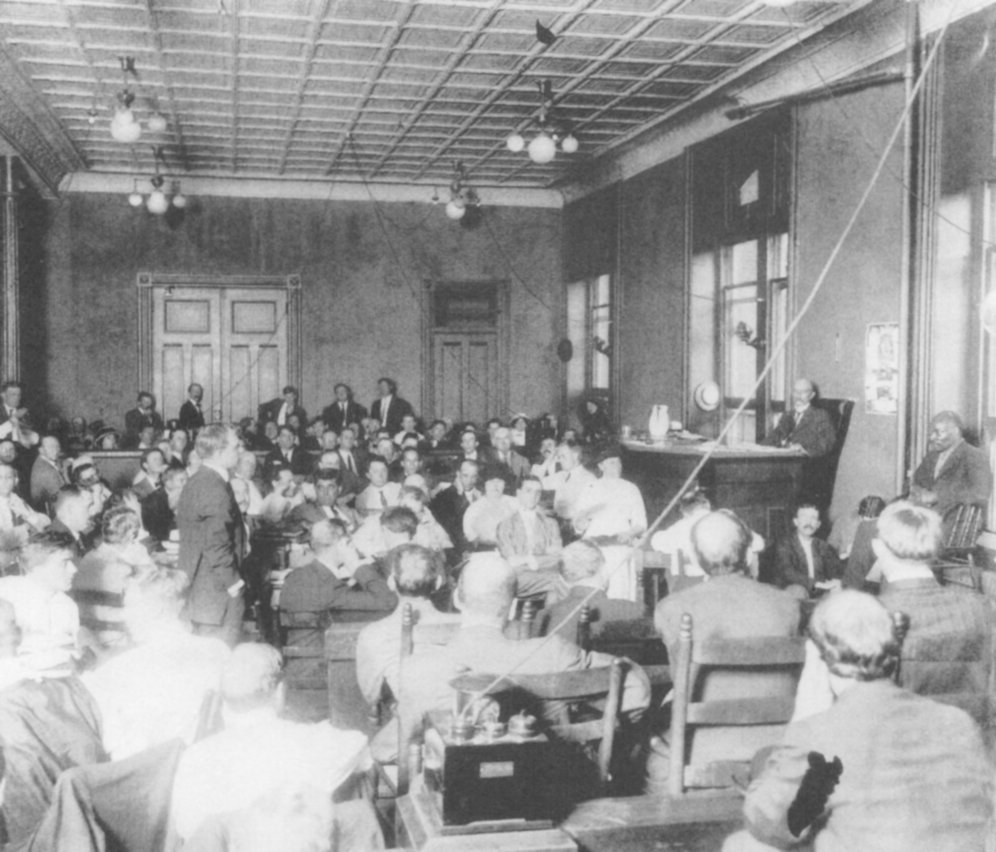
The first day of the trial. Spectators were racially segregated. The stenographer can be seen next to Newt Lee, who is being questioned by prosecutor Hugh Dorsey.

The musical dramatizes the 1913 trial of Jewish factory manager Leo Frank, who was accused and convicted of raping and murdering a thirteen-year-old employee, Mary Phagan. The trial, sensationalized by the media, aroused antisemitic tensions in Atlanta and the U.S. state of Georgia. When Frank's death sentence was commuted to life in prison by the departing Governor of Georgia, John M. Slaton, in 1915 due to his detailed review of over 10,000 pages of testimony and possible problems with the trial, Leo Frank was transferred to a prison in Milledgeville, Georgia, where a lynching party seized and kidnapped him. Frank was taken to Phagan's hometown of Marietta, Georgia, and he was hanged from an oak tree. The events surrounding the investigation and trial led to two groups emerging: the revival of the defunct KKK and the birth of the Jewish Civil Rights organization the Anti-Defamation League (ADL).

Director Harold Prince turned to Jason Robert Brown to write the score after Stephen Sondheim turned the project down. Prince's daughter, Daisy, had brought Brown to her father's attention. Book writer Alfred Uhry, who grew up in Atlanta, had personal knowledge of the Frank story, as his great-uncle owned the pencil factory run by Leo Frank.

The musical's story concludes that the likely killer was the factory janitor Jim Conley, the key witness against Frank at the trial. The villains of the piece are the ambitious and corrupt prosecutor Hugh Dorsey (later the governor of Georgia and then a judge) and the rabidly anti-semitic publisher Tom Watson (later elected a U.S. senator). Prince and Uhry emphasized the evolving relationship between Frank and his wife Lucille. Their relationship shifts from cold to warm in songs like "Leo at Work/What am I Waiting For?," "You Don't Know This Man," "Do it Alone," and "All the Wasted Time". The poignancy of the couple, who fall in love in the midst of adversity, is the core of the work. It makes the tragic outcome – the miscarriage of justice – even more disturbing.

The show was Brown's first Broadway production. His music, according to critic Charles Isherwood, has "subtle and appealing melodies that draw on a variety of influences, from pop-rock to folk to rhythm and blues and gospel."

== Plot ==
=== Act I ===
In Marietta, Georgia, during the American Civil War, the sounds of drums herald the appearance of a young Confederate soldier who bids farewell to his sweetheart as he goes to fight for his homeland. The years pass, and it is 1913. The soldier has become an old one-legged veteran preparing to march in the annual Confederate Memorial Day parade ("The Old Red Hills of Home"). As the parade begins ("The Dream of Atlanta"), Leo Frank, a Jewish man from Brooklyn, New York, is deeply uncomfortable living here due to his religion, college education and the cultural differences between the North and South ("How Can I Call This Home?"). His discomfort spills into his relationship with his wife Lucille, a more assimilated Jewish Georgian, who has planned an outdoor meal spoiled by Leo's decision to go in to work on a holiday. Meanwhile, two local teens, Frankie Epps and Mary Phagan, ride a trolley car and flirt. Frankie wants Mary to go to the movies with him, but Mary playfully resists, insisting her mother will not let her ("The Picture Show"). Mary, who has recently been laid off, leaves to collect her final paycheck from the pencil factory managed by Leo.

Lucille bemoans the state of her marriage, feeling unappreciated by a man so wrapped up in himself and unfulfilled in life; she wonders whether Leo was the right match for her ("Leo at Work" / "What Am I Waiting For?"). Mary arrives in Leo's office to collect her paycheck. That night, police Detective Starnes and Officer Ivey rouse Leo from his sleep, and without telling him why, demand he accompany them to the factory, where Mary has been found raped and murdered in the basement. The police immediately suspect Newt Lee, the African-American night watchman who discovered the body ("Interrogation"). Lee, under interrogation, maintains his innocence, but he inadvertently directs Starnes' suspicion upon Leo, who did not answer his telephone when Lee called him to report the incident. Leo is arrested, but not charged. Mrs. Phagan, Mary's mother, becomes aware of Mary's death.

Reporter Britt Craig sees in Mary's murder the possibility of a career-making story ("Big News"). Craig attends Mary's funeral, where the townspeople of Marietta are angry, mournful, and baffled by the shattering tragedy ("There is a Fountain" / "It Don't Make Sense"). Frankie and Tom Watson, editor of The Jeffersonian, an extremist right-wing newspaper, swear revenge on Mary's killer ("Tom Watson's Lullaby"). Governor John Slaton pressures the local prosecutor Hugh Dorsey to get to the bottom of the crime. Dorsey, an ambitious politician with a "lousy conviction record", together with Starnes and Ivey, interrogate Newt Lee, learning nothing. Dorsey releases Newt, reasoning that "hanging another Nigra ain't enough this time. We gotta do better." He blames Leo and sends Starnes and a reluctant Ivey to find eyewitnesses ("Something Ain't Right"). Craig eagerly begins an effective campaign vilifying Leo ("Real Big News").

Leo meets with his lawyer Luther Z. Rosser, who vows to win the case. Meanwhile, Dorsey makes a deal with factory janitor and ex-convict Jim Conley to testify against Leo in exchange for immunity for a previous escape from prison. Lucille, hounded by reporters, collapses from the strain and rebukes Craig when he attempts to obtain an interview ("You Don't Know This Man"). She tells Leo that she cannot bear to see his trial, but he begs her to stay in the courtroom, as her absence would make him look guilty.

Leo's trial begins, presided over by Judge Roan. A hysterical crowd gathers outside the courtroom, as Watson spews invective ("Hammer of Justice") and Dorsey begins his prosecution ("Twenty Miles from Marietta"). He produces a series of witnesses, most of whom give trumped evidence fed to them by Dorsey. Frankie testifies, falsely, that Mary said Leo "looks at her funny", a sentiment echoed verbatim by three of Mary's teenage co-workers, Iola, Essie and Monteen ("The Factory Girls"). In a fantasy sequence, Leo becomes the lecherous seducer they describe ("Come Up to My Office"). Mary's mother testifies ("My Child Will Forgive Me"), and the Franks' housekeeper Minnie McKnight claims Leo came home in an agitated state the night of the murder and that his marriage to Lucille was abusive. The prosecution's star witness, Jim Conley, claims that he witnessed the murder and helped Leo conceal the crime ("That's What He Said"). Leo is desperate. As Dorsey whips the courtroom into a frenzy, Leo delivers a heartfelt statement, pleading to be believed ("It's Hard to Speak My Heart"), but it is not enough. He is found guilty and sentenced to hang. The crowd breaks out into a jubilant cakewalk as Lucille and Leo watch, terrified ("Summation and Cakewalk").

=== Act II ===
It's now 1915, as Leo appeals the case. The northern press strongly disapproves of the way the trial was conducted, as African-American domestics wonder if the reaction would have been as strong if the victim had been Black ("A Rumblin' and a Rollin'"). Lucille tries to help Leo with his appeal but reveals crucial information to Craig, leading to an argument between herself and Leo ("Do it Alone"). She finds Governor Slaton at a party ("Pretty Music") to advocate for Leo, accusing Slaton of being a fool or a coward if he accepts the verdict. Meanwhile, Watson tells Dorsey that he will support his bid for governor if he makes one. Dorsey and Judge Roan go on a fishing trip, where they discuss the political climate and the upcoming election ("The Glory").

The governor re-opens the case, and Leo and Lucille rejoice ("This Is Not Over Yet"). Slaton visits the factory girls, who admit to their exaggeration (“Factory Girls" (reprise)), and Minnie, who says Dorsey intimidated her and made her sign a statement (“Minnie McKnight's Reprise”). Slaton also visits Jim Conley, who is in jail as an accessory to the murder. Conley sticks to his story despite its noticeable inconsistencies with the evidence, and along with his Chain Gang, refuses to give Slaton any information ("Blues: Feel the Rain Fall"). A year later, after deliberation, Slaton commutes Leo's sentence to life in prison in Milledgeville, Georgia, a move that ends his political career. The citizens of Marietta, led by Dorsey and Watson, are enraged and riot ("Where Will You Stand When the Flood Comes?").

Leo is at a prison work-farm. Lucille visits, and he realizes his deep love for his wife and how much he has underestimated her ("All the Wasted Time"). Later, a party of masked men (including Starnes, Ivey, Frankie, and the Old Confederate Soldier) arrive and kidnap Leo. They take him to Marietta and demand he confess to the murder on pain of death. Leo refuses, and although Ivey is convinced of his innocence, the group prepares to kill him. As his last request, Leo has a sack tied around his waist, since he is wearing only his nightshirt, and asks Ivey to give his wedding ring to Lucille. The group hangs him from an oak tree ("Sh'ma"). Eight months later, on Confederate Memorial Day 1916, a remorseful Britt Craig gives Leo's ring, which has been delivered to him anonymously, to Lucille. He is surprised that she has no plans to leave Georgia, now governed by Dorsey, but she refuses to let Leo's ordeal be for nothing. Alone, she gives in to her grief, but takes comfort in believing that Leo is with God and free from his ordeal. Outside, the annual Memorial Day Parade begins ("Finale").

== Musical numbers ==
Act I

- Prologue: "The Old Red Hills of Home" – Young Soldier, Old Soldier, Ensemble
- Anthem: "The Dream of Atlanta" – Townspeople
- "How Can I Call This Home?" – Leo and Townspeople
- "The Picture Show" – Mary and Frankie
- "Leo At Work" / "What Am I Waiting For?" – Leo and Lucille
- "Interrogation: "I Am Trying to Remember..." – Newt Lee
- "Big News!"^{[A]} – Britt Craig
- Funeral: "There is a Fountain" / "It Don't Make Sense" – Frankie and Townspeople
- "Watson's Lullaby" – Tom Watson
- "Somethin' Ain't Right" – Hugh Dorsey
- "Real Big News" – Britt Craig and Townspeople
- "You Don't Know This Man" – Lucille
- "People of Atlanta"^{[B]} – Fiddling John, Tom Watson and Townspeople
- "Twenty Miles From Marietta" – Hugh Dorsey
- "Frankie's Testimony" – Frankie and Mary
- "Factory Girls / Come Up to My Office" – Iola, Essie, Monteen / Leo
- "Newt Lee's Testimony"^{[C]} – Newt Lee
- "My Child Will Forgive Me" – Mrs. Phagan
- "That's What He Said" – Jim Conley and Townspeople
- "Leo's Statement: It's Hard to Speak My Heart" – Leo
- "Closing Statements and Verdict" – Jurors and Townspeople

Act II

- "It Goes On and On"^{[D]} - Britt Craig
- "Rumblin' and a Rollin'" – Riley, Angela, Jim Conley and Newt Lee
- "Do It Alone" – Lucille
- "Pretty Music" – Governor Slaton
- "Letter to the Governor"^{[E]} – Judge Roan
- "This Is Not Over Yet" – Leo and Lucille
- "Factory Girls" (reprise) – Leo, Lucille, Iola and Factory Girls
- "Newt Lee's Reprise"^{[F]} – Leo, Lucille and Newt
- "Blues: Feel the Rain Fall" – Jim Conley and Chain Gang
- "Where Will You Stand When the Flood Comes?" – Tom Watson, Hugh Dorsey, and Townspeople
- "All the Wasted Time" – Leo and Lucille
- "Sh'ma" – Leo
- Finale: "The Old Red Hills of Home" – Lucille, Leo, Frankie, and Full Company

Notes

- A Cut for the Donmar Warehouse production and the 2023 Broadway revival.
- B Replaced with "Hammer of Justice" in the Donmar Warehouse production and the 2023 Broadway revival.
- C Replaced with "Minnie McKnight's Testimony" in the Donmar Warehouse production and the 2023 Broadway revival.
- D Cut for the 2000 U.S. Tour, the Donmar Warehouse production and the 2023 Broadway revival.
- E Replaced with "The Glory" in the Donmar Warehouse production and the 2023 Broadway revival.
- F Replaced with "Minnie McKnight's Reprise" in the Donmar Warehouse production and the 2023 Broadway revival.

== Characters and original casts ==
Character	Broadway	U.S. Tour	London	Broadway Revival	U.S. Tour
Character	1998	2000	2007	2023	2025
Leo Frank	Brent Carver	David Pittu	Bertie Carvel	Ben Platt	Max Chernin
Lucille Frank	Carolee Carmello	Andréa Burns	Lara Pulver	Micaela Diamond	Talia Suskauer
Frankie Epps	Kirk McDonald	Daniel Frank Kelley	Stuart Matthew Price	Jake Pedersen	Jack Roden
Young Confederate Soldier	Jeff Edgerton	Jeff Edgerton	Stuart Matthew Price	Charlie Webb	Trevor James
Mary Phagan	Christy Carlson Romano	Kristen Bowden	Jayne Wisener	Erin Rose Doyle	Olivia Goosman
Hugh Dorsey	Herndon Lackey	Peter Samuel	Mark Bonnar	Paul Alexander Nolan	Andrew Samonsky
Governor John Slaton	John Hickok	Rick Hilsabeck	Gary Milner	Sean Allan Krill	Christopher Shyer
Britt Craig	Evan Pappas	Randy Redd	Gary Milner	Jay Armstrong Johnson	Michael Tacconi
Mr. Peavy	Don Stephenson	Peter Flynn	Mark Bonnar	Christopher Gurr	Brian Vaughn
Luther Rosser	J. B. Adams	David Vosburgh	Stephen Webb	Christopher Gurr	Brian Vaughn
Officer Ivey	Tad Ingram	Tim Salamandyk	Stephen Webb	Jackson Teeley	Ben Cherington
Prison Guard (Mr. Turner)	Randy Redd	David Coolidge	Stephen Webb	Max Chernin	Ethan Riordan
Jim Conley	Rufus Bonds, Jr.	Keith Byron Kirk	Shaun Escoffery	Alex Joseph Grayson	Ramone Nelson
Newt Lee	Ray Aranha	Ray Aranha	Shaun Escoffery	Eddie Cooper	Robert Knight
Riley	J. C. Montgomery	C. Mingo Long	Shaun Escoffery	Douglas Lyons	Prentiss E. Mouton
Tom Watson	John Leslie Wolfe	John Leslie Wolfe	Norman Bowman	Manoel Felciano	Griffin Binnicker
J. N. Starnes	Peter Samuel	Tim Howard	Norman Bowman	William Michals	Jason Simon
Iola Stover	Brooke Sunny Moriber	Siri Howard	Joanna Kirkland	Sophia Manicone	Sophia Manicone
Essie	Emily Klein	Emily Klein	Celia Mei Rubin	Emily Rose DeMartino	Emily Rose DeMartino
Monteen	Abbi Hutcherson	Sandra DeNise	Zoe Rainey	Ashlyn Maddox	Bailee Endebrock
Angela	Angela Lockett	Carla J. Hargrove	Malinda Parris	Courtnee Carter	Oluchi Nwakorie
Minnie McKnight	—N/a	—N/a	Malinda Parris	Danielle Lee Greaves	Danielle Lee Greaves
Judge Leonard Roan	Don Chastain	Donald Grody	Steven Page	Howard McGillin	Evan Harrington
Old Confederate Soldier	Don Chastain	Donald Grody	Steven Page	Howard McGillin	Evan Harrington
Mrs. Frances Phagan	Jessica Molaskey	Adinah Alexander	Helen Anker	Kelli Barrett	Jenny Hickman
Sally Slaton	Anne Torsiglieri	Elizabeth Brownlee	Helen Anker	Stacie Bono	Alison Ewing
Nurse	Adinah Alexander	Anne Allgood	—N/a	Florrie Bagel	Caroline Fairweather

== Productions ==
=== Broadway ===
The musical premiered on Broadway at the Vivian Beaumont Theater at Lincoln Center on December 17, 1998, and ended its limited run on February 28, 1999, after 39 previews and 85 regular performances. Directed by Harold Prince, it starred Brent Carver as Leo Frank, Carolee Carmello as Lucille Frank, and Christy Carlson Romano as Mary Phagan. Judith Dolan designed costumes for the production.

Most critics praised the show, especially the score. However, the public and some critics received the show coolly. When the show closed, co-producer Livent had filed for bankruptcy protection (Chapter 11). Lincoln Center was the other producer solely responsible for covering the weekly running costs.

=== US national tour (2000) ===
A US national tour, directed by Prince, started at the Fox Theatre in Atlanta, Georgia. It ran from June to October 2000, with Jason Robert Brown conducting at some venues. It starred David Pittu as Leo, Andrea Burns as Lucille, Keith Byron Kirk as Jim and Kristen Bowden as Mary.

=== London ===
The first major production in the United Kingdom played at the Donmar Warehouse from September 24 to November 24, 2007. It was directed by Rob Ashford and starred Lara Pulver as Lucille, Bertie Carvel as Leo, Jayne Wisener as Mary and Stuart Matthew Price as Young Soldier/Frankie. Pulver was nominated for the 2008 Laurence Olivier Award for Best Actress in a Musical and Carvel was nominated for Best Actor in a Musical. A double-CD cast recording of this production has been released by First Night Records. The recording includes new material written by Brown for the production and contains all songs and dialogue from the Donmar production. The large Broadway orchestration was reduced by David Cullen and Brown to a nine-piece ensemble consisting of two pianos, accordion, percussion, clarinet, horn and strings.

Another off-West End production opened on August 10, 2011, for a 6-week engagement ending September 17, at the Southwark Playhouse's Vault Theatre. It was directed by Thom Southerland, with musical staging by Tim Jackson, starring Alastair Brookshaw as Leo, Laura Pitt-Pulford as Lucille, and featuring Simon Bailey as Tom Watson and Mark Inscoe as Hugh Dorsey.

=== 2023 Broadway revival ===
The City Center production started previews at Broadway's Bernard B. Jacobs Theatre on February 21, 2023 and opened on March 16. Platt and Diamond reprised their roles as Leo and Lucille Frank. The revival completed its limited run on August 6, 2023, with 21 preview performances and 169 regular performances. Platt and Diamond appeared on MSNBC's Morning Joe to announce the transfer. Reprising their City Center roles were Krill, Nolan, Johnson, Feliciano, Grayson, and Doyle. Joining them were Kelli Barrett as Mrs. Phagan, Howard McGillin, who played Luther Rosser at City Center, as Old Soldier/Judge Roan, and Jake Pedersen as Frankie Epps. On the night of the show's first preview, members of the neo-Nazi group National Socialist Movement protested against the production outside the theater. A cast album for the production was released by Interscope Records on March 23, 2023. The recording was nominated for a Grammy Award for Best Musical Theater Album.

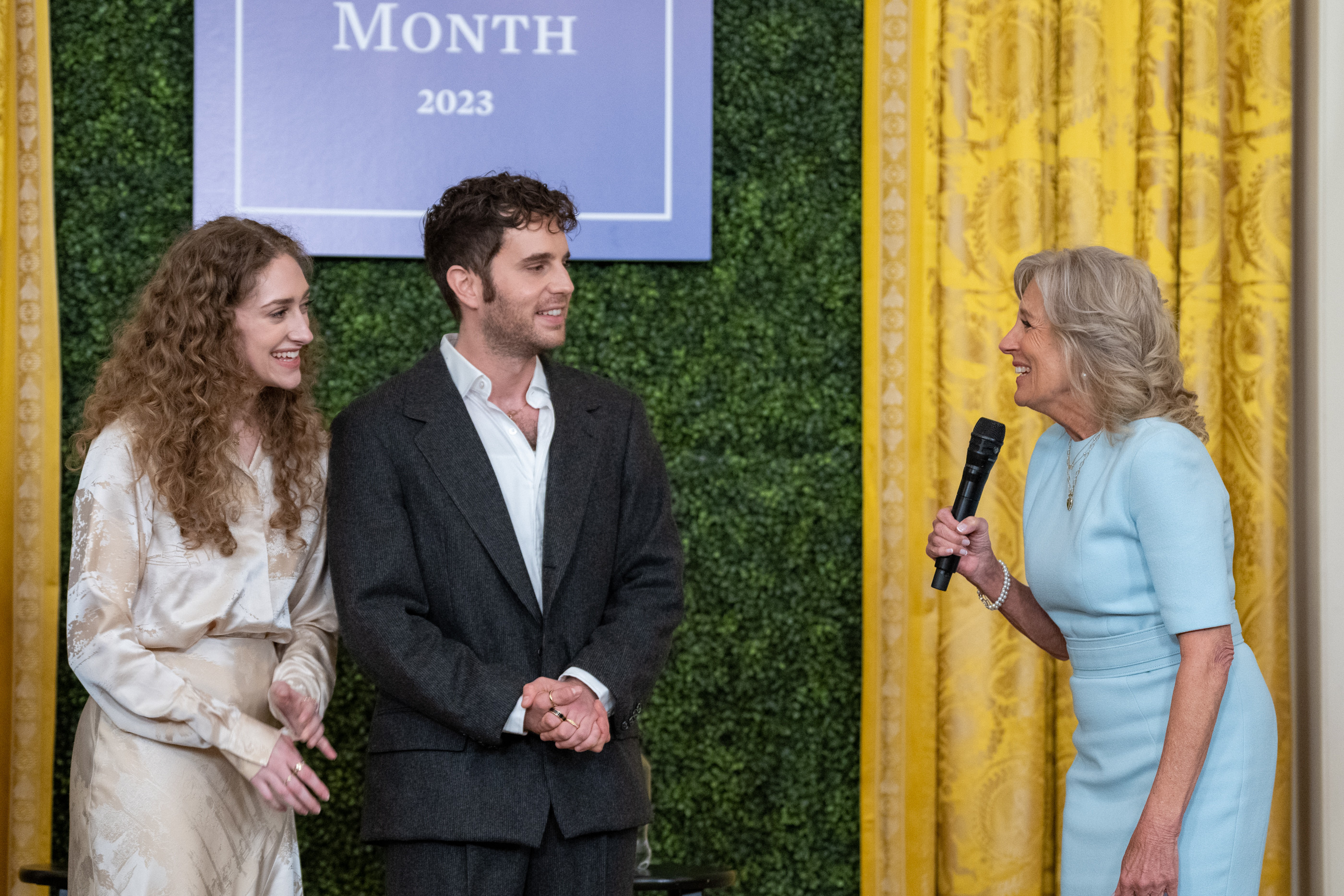
Diamond and Platt (left) with First Lady Jill Biden in 2023

The revival received mostly positive reviews, including those in The New York Times ("well-judged and timely"), Time Out New York ("cause for celebration"), The Guardian ("dynamic and moving"), Entertainment Weekly ("more poignant and powerful than ever"), The New York Post ("Brown's finest music, and Platt's most heart-wrenching work ... Diamond, whose combination of fragility and power is thrilling for an actress so young, brings an electricity to her duets with Platt"), Variety ("theatrically thrilling"), New York Stage Review ("beautifully executed"), New York Theatre Guide ("uniformly terrific cast ... [Platt and Diamond] deliver"); Charles Isherwood dissented in The Wall Street Journal, writing: "Even a first-rate Parade cannot disguise the conceptual problems". The production was nominated for six Tony Awards, winning two for Best Musical Revival and Best Direction of a Musical.

=== US national tour (2025) ===
A national tour of the 2023 production began technical previews at Proctor's Theatre in Schenectady, New York in January 2025, with an official opening at the Orpheum Theatre in Minneapolis, Minnesota. Arden's direction and the production's creative team was retained. Seven cast members from the Broadway production continued with the tour; three retained their roles, and four stepped into roles they understudied in New York, including Max Chernin as Leo Frank. Talia Suskauer starred as Lucille. The tour is scheduled to end on September 7, 2025 at the Kennedy Center in Washington, D.C.

=== Concerts ===
On February 16, 2015, a concert production of Parade was staged at Avery Fisher Hall in Lincoln Center by Manhattan Concert Productions, directed by Gary Griffin and conducted by composer Jason Robert Brown. Jeremy Jordan and Laura Benanti starred as Leo and Lucille, with Ramin Karimloo as Tom, Joshua Henry as Jim, Andy Mientus as Britt, Emerson Steele as Mary, Katie Rose Clarke as Mrs. Phagan, John Ellison Conlee as Hugh, Davis Gaines as Judge Roan/Old Soldier, Eric Anderson as Detective Starnes, and Alan Campbell as Governor Slaton.

New York City Center staged Parade as the gala concert presentation of its 2022/2023 season, with a benefit performance on November 1 and a run continuing through November 6, 2022. Ben Platt and Micaela Diamond played Leo and Lucille Frank. Michael Arden directed and incorporated projections and photography of the real-life trial in the production. Other notable cast members included John Dossett as Old Soldier/Judge Roan, Manoel Felciano as Tom Watson, Jay Armstrong Johnson as Britt Craig, Sean Allan Krill as Governor Slaton, Jennifer Laura Thompson as Sally Slaton, Erin Mackey as Mrs. Phagan, Gaten Matarazzo as Frankie Epps, Alex Joseph Grayson as Jim Conley, Erin Rose Doyle as Mary Phagan, Howard McGillin as Luther Rosser and Paul Alexander Nolan as Hugh Dorsey. Jason Robert Brown conducted the onstage orchestra. Script and score changes from the 2007 Donmar production were retained. Reviews for the run were strongly favorable, with Steven Suskin giving it 5 out of 5 stars and writing in New York Stage Review: "Rather than leaving its audience suitably impressed but emotionally unmoved as in prior viewings, Michael Arden’s spare but meticulous production unleashes the gripping theatricality of the writing that has heretofore been trapped within." Juan A. Ramírez wrote in The New York Times that Platt and Diamond's rendition of "This is Not Over Yet" was a "powerhouse for the ages. Their commanding vocals are matched by a confident production that revives the best of the original while pointing at the possibility of growth, and hope."

=== Other productions ===
Parade was staged in May 2003 at the Orange County School of the Arts in Santa Ana, California, in a production directed by Ryan Mekenian and produced by Susan Egan. It was mounted at the Neighborhood Playhouse in Palos Verdes Estates, California, from July 9, 2008. The production was directed by Brady Schwind. The production starred Craig D'Amico as Leo, Emily Olson as Lucille and Alissa Anderegg as Mary.

The Donmar production transferred to the Mark Taper Forum, Los Angeles, California, in September 2009, for a run through November 15, 2009. Pulver reprised her role as Lucille opposite T. R. Knight as Leo. The cast also included Michael Berresse, Christian Hoff, Hayley Podschun, Rose Sezniak and Phoebe Strole. In 2015, to commemorate the centenary of Frank's lynching, Kennesaw State University's theatre department produced two amateur concert performances of the musical, one each at Marietta's Strand Theatre and Leo Frank's synagogue, The Temple, in Atlanta.

A German language production at the Theater Regensburg in Regensburg, Germany, played for a dozen performances from April to July 2023. It was directed and choreographed by Simon Eichenberger with translations by Wolfgang Adenberg and starred Alejandro Nicolás Firlei Fernández as Leo and Fabiana Locke as Lucille.

== Awards and nominations ==
=== Original Broadway production ===
Year	Award Ceremony	Category	Nominee	Result
1999	Tony Award	Best Musical		Nominated
1999	Tony Award	Best Book of a Musical	Alfred Uhry	Won
1999	Tony Award	Best Original Score	Jason Robert Brown	Won
1999	Tony Award	Best Direction of a Musical	Harold Prince	Nominated
1999	Tony Award	Best Actor in a Musical	Brent Carver	Nominated
1999	Tony Award	Best Actress in a Musical	Carolee Carmello	Nominated
1999	Tony Award	Best Scenic Design	Riccardo Hernandez	Nominated
1999	Tony Award	Best Choreography	Patricia Birch	Nominated
1999	Tony Award	Best Orchestrations	Don Sebesky	Nominated
1999	Drama Desk Award	Outstanding Musical		Won
1999	Drama Desk Award	Outstanding Book of a Musical	Alfred Uhry	Won
1999	Drama Desk Award	Outstanding Music	Jason Robert Brown	Won
1999	Drama Desk Award	Outstanding Lyrics	Jason Robert Brown	Nominated
1999	Drama Desk Award	Outstanding Director of a Musical	Harold Prince	Nominated
1999	Drama Desk Award	Outstanding Actor in a Musical	Brent Carver	Won
1999	Drama Desk Award	Outstanding Actress in a Musical	Carolee Carmello	Won
1999	Drama Desk Award	Outstanding Featured Actor in a Musical	Rufus Bonds, Jr.	Nominated
1999	Drama Desk Award	Outstanding Set Design	Riccardo Hernandez	Nominated
1999	Drama Desk Award	Outstanding Lighting Design	Howell Binkley	Nominated
1999	Drama Desk Award	Outstanding Sound Design	Jonathan Deans	Nominated
1999	Drama Desk Award	Outstanding Choreography	Patricia Birch	Nominated
1999	Drama Desk Award	Outstanding Orchestrations	Don Sebesky	Won
1999	New York Drama Critics' Circle Award	Best Musical	Jason Robert Brown and Alfred Uhry	Won

=== Original London production ===
Year	Award Ceremony	Category	Nominee	Result
2008	Laurence Olivier Award	Best New Musical		Nominated
2008	Laurence Olivier Award	Best Actor in a Musical	Bertie Carvel	Nominated
2008	Laurence Olivier Award	Best Actress in a Musical	Lara Pulver	Nominated
2008	Laurence Olivier Award	Best Performance in a Supporting Role in a Musical	Shaun Escoffery	Nominated
2008	Laurence Olivier Award	Best Director	Rob Ashford	Nominated
2008	Laurence Olivier Award	Best Theatre Choreographer	Rob Ashford	Nominated
2008	Laurence Olivier Award	Best Sound Design	Terry Jardine and Nick Lidster	Nominated

=== 2023 Broadway revival ===
Year	Award Ceremony	Category	Nominee	Result
2023	Tony Awards	Best Revival of a Musical		Won
2023	Tony Awards	Best Direction of a Musical	Michael Arden	Won
2023	Tony Awards	Best Actor in a Musical	Ben Platt	Nominated
2023	Tony Awards	Best Actress in a Musical	Micaela Diamond	Nominated
2023	Tony Awards	Best Costume Design of a Musical	Susan Hilferty	Nominated
2023	Tony Awards	Best Lighting Design of a Musical	Heather Gilbert	Nominated
2023	Drama Desk Awards	Outstanding Revival of a Musical		Won
2023	Drama Desk Awards	Outstanding Lead Performance in a Musical	Micaela Diamond	Nominated
2023	Drama Desk Awards	Outstanding Lighting Design for a Musical	Heather Gilbert	Nominated
2023	Drama Desk Awards	Outstanding Sound Design in a Musical	Jon Weston	Nominated
2023	Drama League Awards	Distinguished Performance Award	Micaela Diamond	Nominated
2023	Drama League Awards	Outstanding Revival of a Musical		Nominated
2023	New York Drama Critics' Circle Awards	Special Citation		Honored
2023	Outer Critics Circle Award	Outstanding Revival of a Musical		Won
2023	Outer Critics Circle Award	Outstanding Director of a Musical	Michael Arden	Won
2023	Outer Critics Circle Award	Outstanding Lead Performer in a Broadway Musical	Micaela Diamond	Nominated
2023	Outer Critics Circle Award	Outstanding Video or Projection Design	Sven Ortel	Nominated
2023	Grammy Awards	Best Musical Theater Album		Nominated
