= Dentist! =

"Dentist!" is a song from the 1986 American horror comedy musical film Little Shop of Horrors, an adaptation of the 1982 stage musical, which is itself an adaptation of the 1960 film The Little Shop of Horrors. It is the character introduction song of Orin Scrivello.

Dentist! is written by the musical's creators, lyricist and book writer Howard Ashman and composer Alan Menken, and performed by Stephen Glenn Martin as Orin Scrivello.

== Overview ==
Orin Scrivello is the secondary antagonist of Little Shop of Horrors. He is a sadistic dentist who is the boyfriend of the main character's love interest. According to Menken, the song was created due to his family's history in dentistry.

== Reception ==
Along with "Mean Green Mother From Outer Space", "Dentist!" is one of the most popular songs from the Little Shop of Horrors soundtrack, and has been considered one of the songs that defines the play.
