= Michael John LaChiusa =

American musical theatre and opera composer (born 1962)

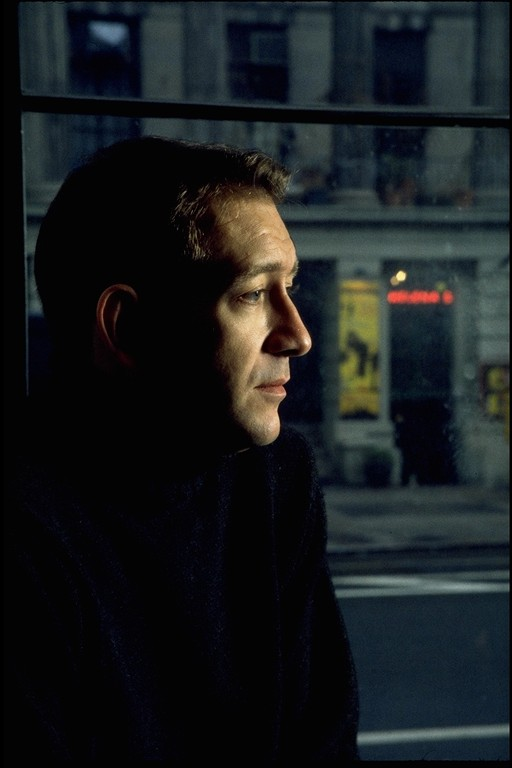
- Official publicity photo
- Born: July 24, 1962 (age 64); Chautauqua, New York, U.S.
- Occupations: Composer, lyricist, librettist
- Writing career
- Period: 1989—present

Michael John LaChiusa Lah-KYOO-suh (born July 24, 1962) is an American musical theatre and opera composer, lyricist, and librettist. He is best known for such musically esoteric shows as Hello Again, Marie Christine, The Wild Party, and See What I Wanna See. He was nominated for four Tony Awards in 2000 for his score and book for both Marie Christine and The Wild Party and received another nomination in 1996 for his work on the libretto for Chronicle of a Death Foretold.

== Biography ==
LaChiusa grew up in Chautauqua, New York, the eldest of three boys in a Roman Catholic family of Italian descent. He described his parents as having had a "[v]ery mentally abusive" relationship. Michael was not close to his father but was encouraged by his mother to pursue his interest in music. He taught himself to play piano at the age of seven and had little formal music training. LaChiusa was influenced early on by the music of "modern American composers" such as John Corigliano, John Adams, and Philip Glass, as well as the musical theatre composers George Gershwin, Richard Rodgers, and Stephen Sondheim. LaChiusa graduated high school early and enrolled in a television journalism program, but he dropped out after a semester.

In 1980, LaChiusa moved to New York City, where he took jobs as a music director and accompanist while trying to find songwriting work. In the mid-1980s, he joined the BMI Lehman Engel Musical Theater Workshop, where he was strongly influenced by a series of mentors and where he segued from writing "camp" songs to more serious work. In 1993, The Public Theater's producer George C. Wolfe presented LaChiusa's First Lady Suite. A year later, Lincoln Center produced his musical Hello Again Off Broadway. A series of interconnected stories about love based on Arthur Schnitzler's play La Ronde, Hello Again was nominated for ten Drama Desk Awards, including three (Outstanding Book of a Musical, Outstanding Music, and Outstanding Lyrics) for LaChiusa.

In 1995, LaChiusa wrote additional book material for the Broadway musical Chronicle of a Death Foretold (an adaptation of Gabriel García Márquez's 1981 novella of the same name.) For the book, written with Graciela Daniele and Jim Lewis, LaChiusa received a Tony Award nomination for Best Book of a Musical.

During the 1999–2000 season, two of LaChiusa's large-scale musicals premiered on Broadway: Marie Christine and The Wild Party. Marie Christine, a retelling of the Medea myth set in 19th-century Louisiana, starred Audra McDonald and attracted controversy due to its grim subject matter and demanding score —The New York Times reported that "even the formidable and classically trained McDonald could sing it only six times a week, rather than the standard eight." Marie Christine closed after 42 performances; LaChiusa later said that the show "in my mind should have been performed for three performances.... Only three. It's huge, and it's intensely difficult". The Wild Party was based on the 1928 poem of the same name by Joseph Moncure March and starred Toni Collette, Mandy Patinkin, and Eartha Kitt. The Wild Party struggled commercially; after it received seven Tony nominations but failed to win a single award, the producers closed the show. For both Marie Christine and The Wild Party, LaChiusa received Tony nominations for Best Book of a Musical and Best Original Score.

In 2003, Little Fish, an uncharacteristically cheerful one-act musical for LaChiusa, based on two short stories by Deborah Eisenberg, premiered Off-Broadway. The show's failure sent LaChiusa into a funk; he recalled, "I went, 'My God, they don't want the hard stuff and more challenging material here in this city from me. They don't want something nice and fun, either. What am I supposed to do?'"

In August 2005, LaChiusa published an article in Opera News that disparaged several successful, upbeat Broadway musicals of the 2000s, among them The Producers and Hairspray, which LaChiusa dubbed a "faux-musical". He continued, "Instead of choreography, there is dancing. Instead of crafted songwriting, there is tune-positioning. Faux-musicals are mechanical; they have to be. For expectations to be met, there can be no room for risk, derring-do or innovation." The article caused a great deal of controversy and provoked shocked responses from several of LaChiusa's colleagues, who saw it as an attack.

In October 2005, LaChiusa's musical See What I Wanna See, based on the stories "In a Grove," "The Dragon," and "Kesa and Morito" by Ryūnosuke Akutagawa, opened Off-Broadway at the Public Theater and closed on December 4, 2005. LaChiusa was nominated for Drama Desk Awards for Outstanding Music and Outstanding Lyrics.

In April 2009, the Signature Theatre, Arlington, Virginia, premiered Giant, a musical adaptation of Edna Ferber's 1952 novel of the same name with music and lyrics by LaChiusa and book by Sybille Pearson, who wrote the book for the 1983 musical Baby.

Queen of the Mist is a musical adaption of the story of Annie Edson Taylor, the first person to survive going over Niagara Falls in a barrel. Commissioned by Off-Broadway theatre company the Transport Group Queen of the Mist received a developmental lab in fall 2010, and opened in November 2011 at The Gym at Judson. With direction by Jack Cummings III and choreography by Scott Rink, the musical stars Mary Testa and Julia Murney.

LaChiusa's work, Nine Fathers of Ariel, is "a dance musical which centers on a mother's effort to provide her son with good fathering in the face of a war-obsessed world". It had a 29-hour private industry reading on April 5, 2014. It was a collaboration with Ellen Fitzhugh, with Graciela Daniele directing and musical direction by Mary Mitchell Campbell. The cast included Tonya Pinkins, Marc Kudisch, Malcolm Gets, Telly Leung, Bryce Ryness, Darius de Haas, Stanley Bahorek, Sydney James Harcourt, Ashley Robinson, Casey Robinson, and Hayley Feinstein.

LaChiusa's musical First Daughter Suite premiered Off-Broadway at the Public Theater on October 6, 2015 (previews), and was directed by Kirsten Sanderson. He stated about the work: "While he didn't want to fully imitate First Lady Suite, LaChiusa felt that the new piece could be an extension of the earlier piece. It would not, however, be a sequel." The musical looks at the women in the lives of presidents Richard Nixon, Jimmy Carter, Ronald Reagan, George H. W. Bush and George W. Bush. The women are: Patricia Nixon, played by Barbara Walsh and daughters Tricia played by Betsy Morgan and Julie played by Cassie Levy; Rosalynn Carter, played by Rachel Bay Jones and Amy Carter played by Carly Tamer; Betty Ford played by Alison Fraser and Susan Ford played by Betsy Morgan; Patti Davis played by Cassie Levy and mother Nancy Reagan, played by Alison Fraser; and Barbara Bush played by Mary Testa and daughter-in-law Laura played by Rachel Bay Jones.

The world premiere of LaChiusa's musical Rain (book by Sybille Pearson, based on the short story "Rain" by Somerset Maugham), ran March 24 – May 1, 2016, at San Diego's Old Globe Theatre. It was directed by Barry Edelstein, and starred Eden Espinosa as Sadie Thompson.

In August 2022, LaChiusa's musical Los Otros began performances at A.R.T in New York City. Originally titled "Tres Ninas" the 2022 production of the musical featured book and lyrics by Ellen Fitzhugh, and direction by Noah Himmelstein. The production starred Luba Mason and Caesar Samayoa.

LaChiusa won a 2008 Emmy Award for his work on the TV series "WonderPets."

=== Teaching ===
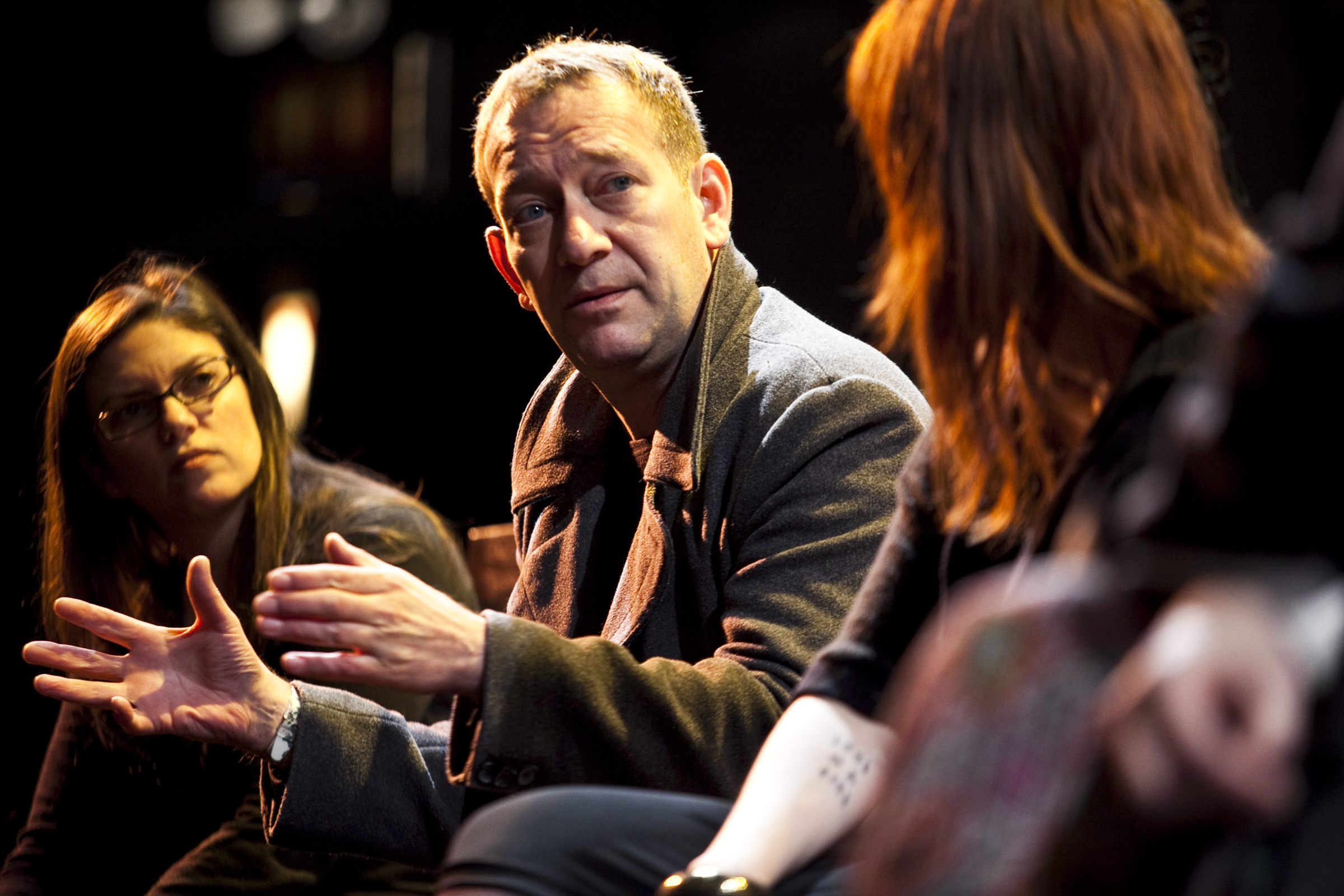
Michael John LaChiusa speaks to students after a performance of his musical Bernarda Alba (musical) at Columbia College.

LaChiusa is an adjunct professor at the Graduate Musical Theatre Writing Program at the Tisch School of the Arts at New York University.

=== Performing ===
LaChiusa also performs at various cabaret and concert venues, including:

- La La Chiusa at Joe's Pub (October 16, 2000 – November 5, 2000);
- The Girly Show, as part of Lincoln Center's American Songbook Series (May 17, 2004) and at Cinespace, Hollywood (August 15, 2005);
- Platform Series at Lincoln Center Theater (March 29, 2006);
- Little Fish in Concert at Joe's Pub (July 10, 2006);
- Concert that featured music from Bernarda Alba and other LaChiusa scores as well as a Little Fish CD Release party; Alice Ripley and Lea DeLaria, appeared at Joe's Pub (September 8, 2008);

=== Personal life ===
In 2004, LaChiusa told The Washington Post that he was a "gay man, happily single".

== Work ==
=== Broadway productions ===
- Chronicle of a Death Foretold (additional book and lyrics with Graciela Daniele and Jim Lewis; music by Bob Telson) (1995)
- Marie Christine (1999)
- The Wild Party (book with George C. Wolfe) (2000)

=== Off-Broadway productions ===
- First Lady Suite (1993)
- Hello Again (1994)
- The Petrified Prince (book by Edward Gallardo) (1994)
- Little Fish (2003)
- See What I Wanna See (2005)
- Bernarda Alba (2006)
- Queen of the Mist (2011)
- Giant (2012)
- First Daughter Suite (2015)
- Los Otros (book and lyrics by Ellen Fitzhugh) (2022)
- The Gardens of Anuncia (2023)

=== Other theatre ===
- Bittersweet, book, music and lyrics by Jerry Young; Boston, MA. Musical Director Michael Lachiusa. (1979)
- Buzzsaw Berkeley, book by Doug Wright, music and lyrics by LaChiusa; WPA Theater, New York City (1989)
- Broken Sleep book by Donald Margulies, Williamstown Theatre Festival, Williamstown, MA, 3 plays with music (1997)
- The Nutcracker, new musical theatre version (translated into Japanese) of The Nutcracker, book by Amon Miyamoto, music and lyrics by LaChiusa; premiere in Tokyo (2001)
- The Highest Yellow, music and lyrics by LaChiusa, book by John Strand; musical commissioned and premiered by Signature Theatre Arlington, Virginia (2004)
- Hotel C'est L'Amour, musical with music and lyrics by LaChiusa and conceived by Daniel Henning; premiere at The Blank Theatre Company, Los Angeles, California (2006)
- Inner Voices: Solo Musicals, three musicals in one act: Act 1 is Tres Ninas, lyrics and music by Ellen Fitzhugh and LaChiusa; Zipper Theater, New York City (2008)
- Giant, music and lyrics by LaChiusa, book by Sybille Pearson, Signature Theatre, Arlington, Virginia (2009)
- Los Otros, book and lyrics by Ellen Fitzhugh, music by LaChiusa, directed by Graciela Daniele, commissioned by Center Theatre Group; Mark Taper Forum, Los Angeles, California (2012)
- Rain, book by Sybille Pearson, music and lyrics by LaChiusa, directed by Barry Edelstein, The Old Globe Theatre, San Diego, California (2016)
- The Gardens of Anuncia, book, music, and lyrics by LaChiusa, directed by Graciela Daniele, The Old Globe Theatre, San Diego, California (2021)
- American Eclipse: The Musical - music and lyrics by LaChiusa, book by David Baron.

=== Opera, song cycles and other music ===
- Four Short Operas: Break, Agnes, Eulogy For Mr. Hamm, Lucky Nurse, book, music and lyrics by LaChiusa, Playwrights Horizons (14 performances) (1991)
- Desert of Roses, libretto by LaChiusa, music by Robert Moran, an opera commissioned and premiered by Houston Grand Opera (1992)
- From the Towers of the Moon, libretto by LaChiusa, music by Robert Moran, an opera commissioned and premiered by Minnesota Opera (1992)
- Tania, libretto by LaChiusa, music by Anthony Davis, Plays and Players Theater, New York City, and recorded (1992)
- Lovers and Friends (Chautauqua Variations), commissioned and performed by Lyric Opera of Chicago, book, music and lyrics by LaChiusa (2001)
- The Seven Deadly Sins: A Song Cycle, "The Christian Thing to Do", contribution to song cycle commissioned for Audra McDonald, performed at Carnegie Hall, New York City (2004)
- The Cello Project, chamber work for cello, part of a song cycle for Peter Sachon, cellist, premiered at the Leonard Nimoy Thalia at Symphony Space, New York City (2005)
- pre.view, choreography by Taye Diggs and Andrew Palermo, music by LaChiusa, Ailey Citigroup Theater, New York City (2006)
- Send (who are you? i love you) music and libretto by LaChiusa, co-conceived by LaChiusa and Lonny Price for Audra McDonald, performed by McDonald with Houston Grand Opera (2006)

=== Television ===
- Wonder Pets: LaChiusa wrote music for 15 episodes of this animated series (2006–07)
- Broadway: The Golden Age: LaChiusa was one of many Broadway insiders interviewed for this documentary (2003)

== Awards and nominations ==
| Year | Association | Category | Title | Result |
|---|---|---|---|---|
| 1994 | Drama Desk Award | Outstanding Lyrics | Hello Again | Nominated |
| 1994 | Drama Desk Award | Outstanding Music | Hello Again | Nominated |
| 1994 | Drama Desk Award | Outstanding Book | Hello Again | Nominated |
| 1996 | Drama Desk Award | Outstanding Music | Chronicle of a Death Foretold | Nominated |
| 1996 | Tony Award | Best Book | Chronicle of a Death Foretold | Nominated |
| 2000 | Tony Award | Best Book | Marie Christine | Nominated |
| 2000 | Tony Award | Best Score | Marie Christine | Nominated |
| 2000 | Tony Award | Best Book | The Wild Party | Nominated |
| 2000 | Tony Award | Best Score | The Wild Party | Nominated |
| 2006 | Drama Desk Award | Outstanding Music | See What I Wanna See | Nominated |
| 2006 | Drama Desk Award | Outstanding Lyrics | See What I Wanna See | Nominated |
| 2012 | Drama Desk Award | Outstanding Music | Queen of the Mist | Nominated |
| 2012 | Drama Desk Award | Outstanding Lyrics | Queen of the Mist | Nominated |
| 2012 | Drama Desk Award | Outstanding Book | Queen of the Mist | Nominated |
| 2013 | Drama Desk Award | Outstanding Music | Giant | Nominated |
| 2013 | Drama Desk Award | Outstanding Lyrics | Giant | Nominated |
| 2016 | Drama Desk Award | Outstanding Music | First Daughter Suite | Nominated |
| 2016 | Drama Desk Award | Outstanding Lyrics | First Daughter Suite | Nominated |
