= Chronicle of a Death Foretold (disambiguation) =

Chronicle of a Death Foretold is a 1981 novella by Gabriel García Márquez.

Chronicle of a Death Foretold may also refer to:

- Chronicle of a Death Foretold (film), a 1987 film directed by Francesco Rosi
- Chronicle of a Death Foretold (musical), a 1995 musical
