= Sound on Sound Studios =

New York City recording studio

Coordinates: 40.81173271698632°N 74.21320194762367°W

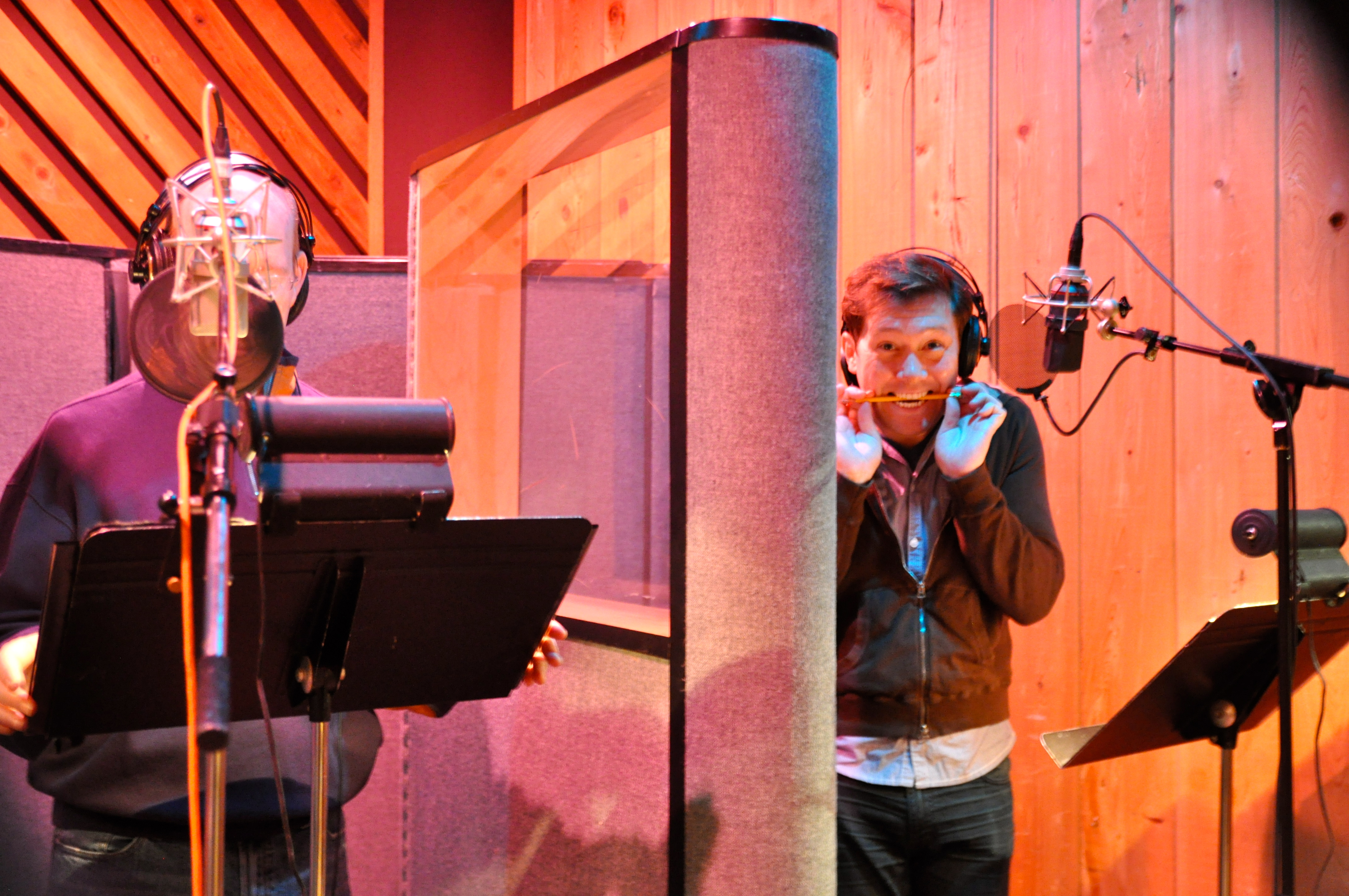
Queen of the Mist cast album recording, January 2012

Sound on Sound Studios, formerly known as MSR Studios (Manhattan Sound Recordings), is a photography and movie producing company recording facility in Montclair, New Jersey. Its forebear, MSR Studios, was located in Manhattan, just outside Times Square at 168 West 48th Street, between 6th and 7th avenues. Originating from the merger of Sound on Sound and Right Track Recording, the studio was first known as Legacy Studios.

== Closure and reopening ==
MSR Studios ceased operations at its Midtown location in June 2016. Noise levels from the construction of a nearby hotel made recording difficult. It reopened its doors to the public in Montclair, New Jersey as Sound on Sound Studios in 2017.
