= 54th Tony Awards =

2000 US theatrical awards ceremony

- Official poster for the 54th annual Tony Awards
- Date: June 4, 2000
- Location: Radio City Music Hall, New York City, New York
- Hosted by: Rosie O'Donnell, Nathan Lane
- Most wins: Kiss Me, Kate (5)
- Most nominations: Kiss Me, Kate (12)
- Website: tonyawards.com

Television/radio coverage
- Network: CBS

The 54th Annual Tony Awards was an event held at Radio City Music Hall on June 4, 2000, and broadcast by CBS. "The First Ten" awards ceremony, produced in association with Thirteen/WNET New York was telecast on PBS. It was hosted, for the third time since 1997, by Rosie O'Donnell, with special guest Nathan Lane.

== Eligibility ==
Shows that opened on Broadway during the 1999–2000 season, before May 2, 2000, were eligible.

Original plays

- Copenhagen
- Dirty Blonde
- The Green Bird
- The Ride Down Mt. Morgan
- Rose
- Taller Than a Dwarf
- True West
- Voices in the Dark
- Waiting in the Wings
- Wrong Mountain

Original musicals

- Aida
- Contact
- James Joyce's The Dead
- Kat and the Kings
- Marie Christine
- Putting It Together
- Riverdance – On Broadway
- Saturday Night Fever
- Swing!
- The Wild Party

Play revivals

- Amadeus
- Epic Proportions
- A Moon for the Misbegotten
- The Price
- The Rainmaker
- The Real Thing
- Uncle Vanya

Musical revivals

- Jesus Christ Superstar
- Kiss Me, Kate
- The Music Man
- Tango Argentino

== Ceremony ==
The opening number was a medley of “Superstar,” “Paris Original,” “I’ll Cover You,” and “I Want To Go To Hollywood” performed by Rosie O'Donnell, Megan Mullally, Jesse L. Martin, and Jane Krakowski, respectively, in tribute to the major Broadway roles each performer played prior to their TV roles.

Production numbers from musicals included Contact, Boyd Gaines and the Girl in the Yellow Dress, Deborah Yates; Kiss Me, Kate, "Too Darn Hot"; Jesus Christ Superstar, "Superstar" and "Gethsemane"; The Music Man, Craig Bierko in "Seventy-Six Trombones"; The Wild Party, medley from Mandy Patinkin, Eartha Kitt and Toni Collette; Swing!, medley from company and Ann Hampton Callaway and Laura Benanti; and James Joyce's The Dead, "Parnell's Plight."

Ten awards were presented prior to the main ceremony and were broadcast on Public Television in a show titled "The First 10 Awards: Tonys 2000." The show had interviews and showed clips from the season's productions, and presented the awards: Direction (Play and Musical), Choreography, Original Score, Book of a Musical, Costume Design, Scenic Design, Orchestration, Lighting Design and Regional Theater. Michael Blakemore is the only director to win Tony Awards as Best Director of a Play and Best Director of a Musical in the same year. He won this year for Copenhagen (play) and Kiss Me, Kate (musical).

The television ratings for this broadcast were 7.2, down from the 1999 Tony Award broadcast of 7.9. In prior years in which O'Donnell hosted, the program had ratings of 11.2 (1997) and 10.3 (1998).

== Contact controversy ==
The winner of the award for Best Musical, Contact, raised controversy about what constitutes a musical, as it is a dance musical with no singing and minimal dialogue; and instead of original music, it uses pre-recorded music and songs. As a result of the controversy, a new category was created for the Tony Awards: Best Special Theatrical Event.

== Winners and nominees ==
Winners are in bold

| Best Play | Best Musical |
|---|---|
| **Copenhagen – Michael Frayn**; Dirty Blonde – Claudia Shear; The Ride Down Mt. Morgan – Arthur Miller; True West – Sam Shepard | **Contact**; James Joyce's The Dead; Swing!; The Wild Party |
| Best Revival of a Play | Best Revival of a Musical |
| **The Real Thing**; Amadeus; A Moon for the Misbegotten; The Price | **Kiss Me, Kate**; Jesus Christ Superstar; The Music Man; Tango Argentino |
| Best Performance by a Leading Actor in a Play | Best Performance by a Leading Actress in a Play |
| **Stephen Dillane – The Real Thing as Henry**; Gabriel Byrne – A Moon for the Misbegotten as James Tyrone, Jr.; Philip Seymour Hoffman – True West as Austin (Alternated with Lee); John C. Reilly – True West as Lee (Alternated with Austin); David Suchet – Amadeus as Antonio Salieri | **Jennifer Ehle – The Real Thing as Annie**; Jayne Atkinson – The Rainmaker as Lizzie Curry; Rosemary Harris – Waiting in the Wings as May Davenport; Cherry Jones – A Moon for the Misbegotten as Josie Hogan; Claudia Shear – Dirty Blonde as Jo/Mae West |
| Best Performance by a Leading Actor in a Musical | Best Performance by a Leading Actress in a Musical |
| **Brian Stokes Mitchell – Kiss Me, Kate as Fred Graham/Petruchio**; Craig Bierko – The Music Man as Harold Hill; George Hearn – Putting It Together as The Husband; Mandy Patinkin – The Wild Party as Burrs; Christopher Walken – James Joyce's The Dead as Gabriel Conroy | **Heather Headley – Aida as Aida**; Toni Collette – The Wild Party as Queenie; Rebecca Luker – The Music Man as Marian Paroo; Marin Mazzie – Kiss Me, Kate as Lilli Vanessi/Katherine; Audra McDonald – Marie Christine as Marie Christine L'Adrese |
| Best Performance by a Featured Actor in a Play | Best Performance by a Featured Actress in a Play |
| **Roy Dotrice – A Moon for the Misbegotten as Phil Hogan**; Kevin Chamberlin – Dirty Blonde as Various Characters; Daniel Davis – Wrong Mountain as Maurice Montesor; Derek Smith – The Green Bird as Tartaglia; Bob Stillman – Dirty Blonde as Various Characters | **Blair Brown – Copenhagen as Margrethe Bohr**; Frances Conroy – The Ride Down Mt. Morgan as Theo; Amy Ryan – Uncle Vanya as Sofya Alexandrovna; Helen Stenborg – Waiting in the Wings as Sarita Myrtle; Sarah Woodward – The Real Thing as Charlotte |
| Best Performance by a Featured Actor in a Musical | Best Performance by a Featured Actress in a Musical |
| **Boyd Gaines – Contact as Michael Wiley**; Michael Berresse – Kiss Me, Kate as Bill Calhoun/Lucentio; Stephen Spinella – James Joyce's The Dead as Freddy Malins; Lee Wilkof – Kiss Me, Kate as First Man; Michael Mulheren – Kiss Me, Kate as Second Man | **Karen Ziemba – Contact as Wife**; Laura Benanti – Swing! as Various Characters; Ann Hampton Callaway – Swing! as Various Characters; Eartha Kitt – The Wild Party as Dolores; Deborah Yates – Contact as Girl in a Yellow Dress/Gina Minetti |
| Best Book of a Musical | Best Original Score (Music and/or Lyrics) Written for the Theatre |
| **Richard Nelson – James Joyce's The Dead**; John Weidman – Contact; Michael John LaChiusa – Marie Christine; Michael John LaChiusa and George C. Wolfe – The Wild Party | **Aida – Elton John (music) and Tim Rice (lyrics)**; James Joyce's The Dead – Shaun Davey (music and lyrics) and Richard Nelson (lyrics); Marie Christine – Michael John LaChiusa (music and lyrics); The Wild Party – Michael John LaChiusa (music and lyrics) |
| Best Scenic Design | Best Costume Design |
| **Bob Crowley – Aida**; Thomas Lynch – The Music Man; Robin Wagner – Kiss Me, Kate; Tony Walton – Uncle Vanya | **Martin Pakledinaz – Kiss Me, Kate**; Bob Crowley – Aida; Constance Hoffman – The Green Bird; William Ivey Long – The Music Man |
| Best Lighting Design | Best Orchestrations |
| **Natasha Katz – Aida**; Jules Fisher and Peggy Eisenhauer – The Wild Party; Jules Fisher and Peggy Eisenhauer – Marie Christine; Peter Kaczorowski – Kiss Me, Kate | **Don Sebesky – Kiss Me, Kate**; Doug Besterman – The Music Man; Jonathan Tunick – Marie Christine; Harold Wheeler – Swing! |
| Best Direction of a Play | Best Direction of a Musical |
| **Michael Blakemore – Copenhagen**; James Lapine – Dirty Blonde; David Leveaux – The Real Thing; Matthew Warchus – True West | **Michael Blakemore – Kiss Me, Kate**; Susan Stroman – The Music Man; Susan Stroman – Contact; Lynne Taylor-Corbett – Swing! |
Best Choreography
**Susan Stroman – Contact**; Kathleen Marshall – Kiss Me, Kate; Susan Stroman – The Music Man; Lynne Taylor-Corbett – Swing!

== Special awards ==
Regional Theatre Award

- The Utah Shakespearean Festival

Special Lifetime Achievement Tony Award

- T. Edward Hambleton

Special Tony Award For a Live Theatrical Presentation

- Dame Edna: The Royal Tour

Tony Honors for Excellence in Theatre

- Eileen Heckart
- Sylvia Herscher
- City Center Encores!

=== Multiple nominations and awards ===
These productions had multiple nominations:

- 12 nominations: Kiss Me, Kate
- 8 nominations: The Music Man
- 7 nominations: Contact and The Wild Party
- 6 nominations: Swing!
- 5 nominations: Aida, Dirty Blonde, James Joyce's The Dead, Marie Christine and The Real Thing
- 4 nominations: A Moon for the Misbegotten and True West
- 3 nominations: Copenhagen
- 2 nominations: Amadeus, The Green Bird, The Ride Down Mt. Morgan, Uncle Vanya and Waiting in the Wings

The following productions received multiple awards.

- 5 wins: Kiss Me, Kate
- 4 wins: Aida and Contact
- 3 wins: Copenhagen and The Real Thing

== See also ==
- Drama Desk Awards
- 2000 Laurence Olivier Awards – equivalent awards for West End theatre productions
- Obie Award
- New York Drama Critics' Circle
- Theatre World Award
- Lucille Lortel Awards
