= Bruce Coughlin =

American orchestrator and musical arranger

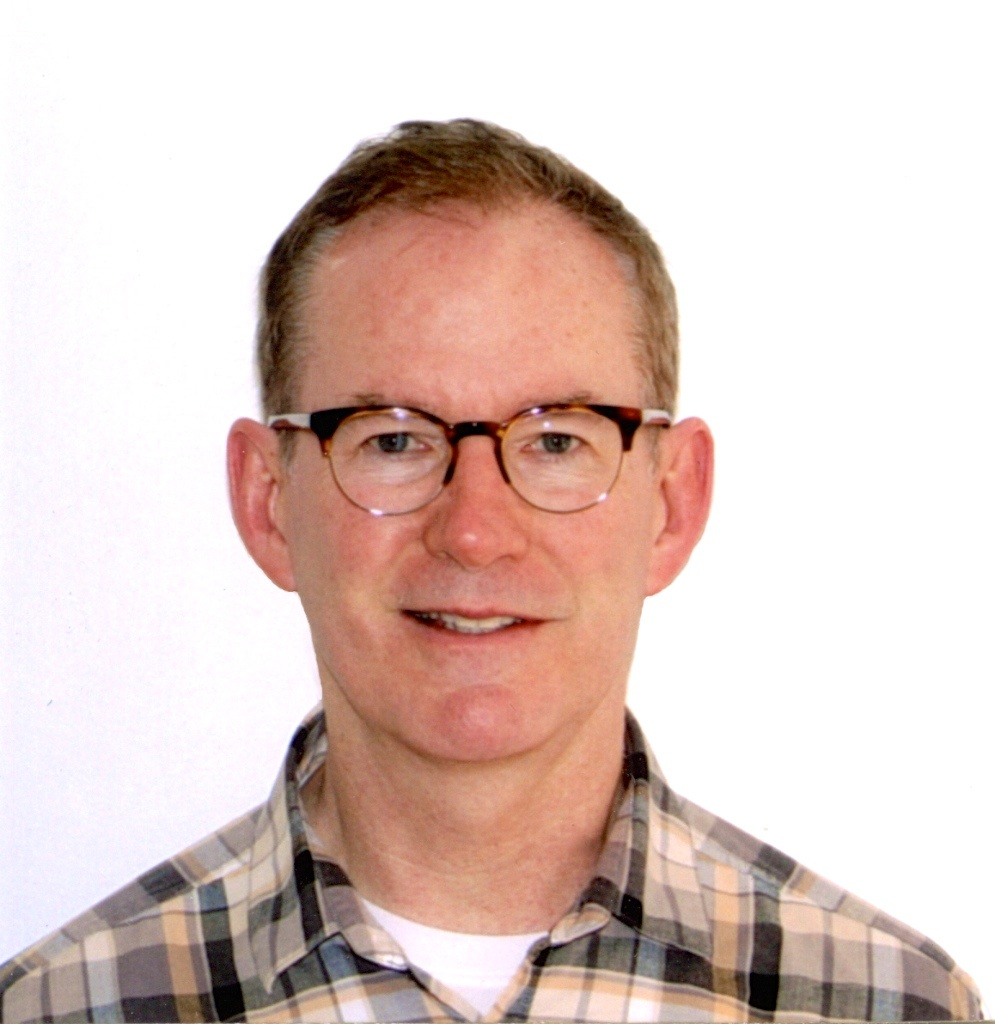
- Occupations: Orchestrator; Musical arranger
- Known for: Metallica S&M2; The Light in the Piazza, Urinetown, Floyd Collins; The Grapes of Wrath
- Style: Musical theatre Classical; Opera
- Awards: Tony Award for Best Orchestrations; Drama Desk Award for Outstanding Orchestrations; Obie Award

Bruce Coughlin (/ˈkɒflɪn/ KOF-lin) is an American orchestrator and musical arranger. He has won a Tony Award (out of 3 total nominations), a Drama Desk Award (out of 11 total nominations), and an Obie Award.

== Personal life ==
He currently lives in the East Village, New York City.

== Career ==
After graduating from Dartmouth College Coughlin moved to New York City and worked as a composer for several years, primarily writing incidental music for plays and dance. Theaters he composed scores for include The Hartford Stage (Antony and Cleopatra), BAM Theater Company (A Midsummer Night’s Dream and The Winter’s Tale), Denver Center Theater and many others.

He has said that composing did not suit his personality as well as orchestrating and with the 1981 musical Is There Life After High School? (by Craig Carnelia and Jeffrey Kindley) he got the opportunity to move into writing orchestrations for the theater. He had been hired as musical director of the show, but was asked to also do orchestrations on the side. The show had a regional run at Hartford Stage in CT and a year later arrived on Broadway. It had a lengthy preview period at the Ethel Barrymore Theatre but a short run of only 12 performances. Despite what must have been a disappointing start to orchestrating for the theater the "side job" eventually became his primary focus. Since that time he has orchestrated over 100 works for Broadway and other theater, opera, recordings and concert hall.

After a period of working in the commercial world as a composer and arranger (for jingles and industrials), Coughlin came back to orchestrating for the theater with William Finn’s Romance In Hard Times at the Public Theater in 1989. He continued to orchestrate various shows off-Broadway and in regional theaters (including William Bolcom’s Casino Paradise).

His first big theater success was as orchestrator for Adam Guettel’s Floyd Collins in 1994, directed by Tina Landau. The show later played at Playwrights Horizons in New York (where he won an Obie award for his work on that show). It had a short run but made a big impact on contemporary musical theater.

=== Broadway and West End ===
Coughlin’s first Broadway orchestrations were for revivals of classic Broadway shows including the 1996 revival of The King and I, The Sound of Music (1998), and Once Upon A Mattress starring Sarah Jessica Parker. Later he also orchestrated revivals of On the Town and Annie Get Your Gun (starring Bernadette Peters).

Original Broadway musicals he has orchestrated include Triumph of Love (starring Betty Buckley), The Wild Party (Michael John LaChiusa), Urinetown (for which he received a Tony Award nomination), Dolly Parton's 9 to 5, Amélie and War Paint (starring Patti LuPone and Christine Ebersole).

In 2005, he collaborated with Ted Sperling and Adam Guettel on orchestrations for Guettel’s The Light in the Piazza which became “a surprise popular hit”. The show garnered all three a Tony Award and a Drama Desk Award for best orchestrations that year.

Coughlin has also provided additional orchestrations for the Broadway musicals Big Fish, On the Twentieth Century (2015 revival) and Something Rotten!, among others.

In 2014, he orchestrated another revival (of sorts) when he expanded his original 5-piece orchestration of Urinetown for the London premiere of the show thirteen years later. The expanded orchestration only added one additional player (a trumpet) but required rewriting of all the wind instruments in the show. He has written that this 6-piece expanded version is what he had always wanted for the original Broadway version, but the budget didn't allow for the extra player. The London production had a successful run at the St James Theatre (now The Other Palace) and then moved to the West End.

=== Long-time collaborations ===
Coughlin has had long-running collaborations with three prominent composers: Michael John LaChiusa, the songwriting team of Scott Frankel (music) and Michael Korie (lyrics), and with opera and theater composer Ricky Ian Gordon. For LaChiusa he orchestrated 6 shows and one opera including Giant (Larry Hochman provided additional orchestrations), The Wild Party, See What I Wanna See, and First Daughter Suite (a co-orchestration with Michael Starobin).

For Frankel and Korie, he orchestrated Grey Gardens (for which he received a Tony Award nomination), Far From Heaven, Happiness (directed by Susan Stroman), Finding Neverland (UK version) and War Paint.

He co-orchestrated (with the composer) three major Gordon operas (The Grapes of Wrath, 27 and Morning Star) and (as sole orchestrator) three musicals.

=== International ===
Coughlin has also worked extensively overseas, providing orchestrations for five new musicals at Søren Møller's Fredericia Teater in Denmark; for revivals of Candide (in a chamber music orchestration for the National Theatre), Assassins and the aforementioned Urinetown in London; and for 3 musicals (co-orchestrations with Larry Hochman) by María Isabel Murillo MISI in Bogotá, Colombia.

=== Recordings and classical work ===
In the non-theater realm, he has written orchestrations for many singers (for both concert and recording) including Audra McDonald, Kristen Chenoweth, Julian Fleisher, Nadine Sierra, and Darius de Haas.

In the classical world, Coughlin has often worked with conductor Michael Tilson Thomas, notably as orchestrator for Bernstein’s Arias and Barcarolles, The Thomashevsky Project (with co-orchestrator Peter Gordon) and on the 1992 recording of Bernstein's On the Town, where he orchestrated two songs cut from the original 1944 production. Those songs ("Gabey's Comin’" and "The Intermission's Great") had never been orchestrated but were added back for this new recording. "Gabey’s Comin’" is now a part of the currently available live-performance version of the show. In 2016 they collaborated once again on one of Tilson Thomas's own compositions (Four Preludes on Playthings of the Wind) with Coughlin supplying orchestration assistance as the score was finalized.

It was Tilson Thomas who suggested Coughlin to Bruce Hornsby who was assembling a concert suite of four songs to be premiered at the New World Symphony in 2015. In his writing Hornsby had become interested in the techniques of modern classical music (Ligeti, Carter, Schoenberg, etc.) and was experimenting with ways to meld those compositional techniques with his own signature pop music style. The concert was a success and the collaboration continued. The suite now consists of eleven songs.

=== Metallica and S&M2 ===
In 2019 he joined forces with Metallica and Michael Tilson Thomas and the San Francisco Symphony to create arrangements and orchestrations for S&M2, marking the 20th anniversary of the legendary S&M concert of 1999. Many of the original Michael Kamen orchestrations were used, and the concert updated with Metallica material from the last 20 years. Coughlin arranged and orchestrated "Moth Into Flame", "Halo On Fire", "Confusion", "The Day That Never Comes", "Unforgiven III", and "All Within My Hands". He also wrote a new orchestration for Master of Puppets from the original S&M concert and adapted and reworked Geoff Alexander and Michael Kamen's Enter Sandman chart. S&M2 was the inaugural concert in the new Chase Center arena in San Francisco. Performances took place September 6 and 8 with a world-wide one-night-only movie screening planned for the following month.

== Works ==
Year	Title	Contribution	Venue	Ref.
1982	Is there life after high school?	Orchestrations	Broadway, Ethel Barrymore Theatre	
1996	The King and I	Additional orchestrations	Broadway, Neil Simon Theatre	
1996	Once Upon a Mattress	Orchestrations	Broadway, Broadhurst Theatre	
1997	Triumph of Love	Orchestrations	Broadway, Royale Theatre	
1998	The Sound of Music	Orchestrations	Broadway, Martin Beck Theatre	
1998	On The Town	Orchestrations	Broadway, Gershwin Theatre	
1999	Annie Get Your Gun	Orchestrations	Broadway, Marquis Theatre	
2000	The Wild Party	Orchestrations	Broadway, Virginia Theatre	
2001	Urinetown	Orchestrations	Broadway, Henry Miller's Theatre	
2003	Gypsy	Additional orchestrations	Broadway, Shubert Theatre	
2005	The Light in the Piazza	Additional orchestrations	Broadway, Vivian Beaumont Theatre	
2006	Lestat	Additional orchestrations	Broadway, Palace Theatre	
2006	Grey Gardens	Orchestrations	Broadway, Walter Kerr Theatre	
2009	Guys and Dolls	Orchestrations	Broadway, Nederlander Theatre	
2009	9 to 5	Orchestrations	Broadway, Marquis Theatre	
2012	Scandalous	Orchestrations	Broadway, Neil Simon Theatre	
2013	Big Fish	Additional orchestrations	Broadway, Neil Simon Theatre	
2015	On The Twentieth Century	Additional orchestrations	Broadway, American Airlines Theatre	
2015	Something Rotten!	Additional orchestrations	Broadway, St. James Theatre	
2017	Amélie	Orchestrations	Broadway, Walter Kerr Theatre	
2017	War Paint	Orchestrations	Broadway, Nederlander Theatre	
2023	How to Dance in Ohio	Orchestrations	Broadway, Belasco Theatre	
2024	Once Upon a Mattress	Orchestrations	Broadway, Hudson Theatre	
2025	Floyd Collins	Orchestrations	Broadway, Vivian Beaumont Theatre	

== Awards and nominations ==
Awards and nominations
Year	Award	Category	Work	Result	Ref.
1995	Obie Award	Orchestrations	Floyd Collins	Won	
2005	Tony Award	Best Orchestrations	The Light in the Piazza	Won	
2005	Drama Desk Award	Outstanding Orchestrations	The Light in the Piazza	Won	
1996	Drama Desk Award	Outstanding Orchestrations	Floyd Collins	Nominated	
1998	Drama Desk Award	Outstanding Orchestrations	The Sound of Music	Nominated	
2001	Drama Desk Award	Outstanding Orchestrations	Urinetown	Nominated	
2002	Tony Award	Best Orchestrations	Urinetown	Nominated	
2006	Drama Desk Award	Outstanding Orchestrations	Grey Gardens	Nominated	
2006	Drama Desk Award	Outstanding Orchestrations	See What I Wanna See	Nominated	
2007	Tony Award	Best Orchestrations	Grey Gardens	Nominated	
2009	Drama Desk Award	Outstanding Orchestrations	9 to 5	Nominated	
2011	Drama Desk Award	Outstanding Orchestrations	The Burnt Part Boys	Nominated	
2013	Drama Desk Award	Outstanding Orchestrations	Giant	Nominated	
2016	Drama Desk Award	Outstanding Orchestrations	First Daughter Suite	Nominated	
2017	Drama Desk Award	Outstanding Orchestrations	War Paint	Nominated	
