= First Daughter Suite =

Musical by Michael John LaChiusa

- Music: Michael John LaChiusa
- Lyrics: Michael John LaChiusa
- Book: Michael John LaChiusa
- Productions: 2015 Off-Broadway

First Daughter Suite is a chamber musical with music, lyrics, and book by Michael John LaChiusa. A continuation of his 1993 musical First Lady Suite, First Daughter Suite is composed of four narrative segments, each centered on the mothers and daughters of political families in United States history. The figures portrayed include the Nixon, Carter, Ford, Reagan, and Bush families. The musical premiered Off-Broadway in 2015 at The Public Theater.

== Productions ==
First Daughter Suite premiered Off-Broadway at The Public Theater under the direction of Kirsten Sanderson. Previews began October 6, 2015, and the show opened October 21, 2015, and ran through November 22, 2015.

A cast recording through Ghostlight Records was released in digital format on February 26, 2016, with the physical CD released for sale on April 1, 2016.

=== Original Off-Broadway cast (2015) ===
Character	Performer
Patricia Nixon	Barbara Walsh
Tricia Nixon/Susan Ford	Betsy Morgan
Julie Nixon/Patti Davis	Caissie Levy
Hannah Milhous Nixon/Robin Bush	Theresa McCarthy
Rosalynn Carter/Laura Bush	Rachel Bay Jones
Amy Carter	Carly Tamer
Betty Ford/Nancy Reagan	Alison Fraser
Anita Castelo	Isabel Santiago
Barbara Bush	Mary Testa

== Plot ==
=== Act I ===
Happy Pat (Patricia Nixon, Hannah Milhous Nixon, Tricia Nixon, and Julie Nixon)

Setting: The White House East Sitting Room. Late afternoon, June 11, 1972.

Patricia Nixon and her daughters, Tricia and Julie, prepare for Tricia's White House wedding under the threat of rain. Pat contends with the quarreling sisters, the hypercritical ghost of her mother-in-law Hannah Milhous Nixon, and the building scandal at which her husband is the center.

Amy Carter's Fabulous Dream Adventure (Rosalynn Carter, Amy Carter, Betty Ford, and Susan Ford)

Setting: The deck of the Presidential Yacht. Spring 1980.

In a dream sequence from the mind of twelve-year-old Amy Carter, she and her mother Rosalynn are accompanied on the Presidential yacht by Betty Ford and her daughter Susan. The dream occurs in the wake of Amy's father, President Jimmy Carter, facing the Iran hostage crisis, and is grounded to reality by Amy's own insecurities as a young First Daughter, her want to save her father's presidency, and her fears of leaving her White House home. In the "Fabulous Dream Adventure," the group sails to Iran to free the American hostages and fend off terrorists with Amy's Barbie doll. The dream becomes increasingly chaotic as Susan kills Betty and Rosalynn then threatens Amy, who fights back with her Barbie. The dream resolves with everyone alive and well. Amy realizes her dream is too big for her to handle herself, Susan apologizes to her mother, and the group decides to vacation in Puerto Rico before Amy wakes up and they must return to their normal lives.

=== Act II ===
Patti By The Pool - (Nancy Reagan, Patti Davis, and Anita Castelo)

Setting: Betsy Bloomingdale's Holmby Hills Home, California. November 1986.

Nancy Reagan and her rebellious daughter Patti Davis engage in a tense reunion at the home of socialite Betsy Bloomingdale. The scene depicts the strained relationship between mother and daughter following the release of Patti's fictionalized novel about her family. Throughout the mostly dialogue-driven scene, the reunion is punctuated by Patti's scathing criticisms of her mother. Just as the two seem to reconcile, Patti asks about her father and the Iran-Contra scandal. Nancy insists that he knew nothing of the situation, and that this is all Patti needs to say. Nancy amends her statement by telling her daughter that it would be best for her not to talk about her father until the situation is resolved, or as Patti sees it, covered up. Patti realizes Nancy's intent behind the conversation is to ensure Patti's silence on the scandal, and she lashes out at her mother once more. Nancy has her maid Anita bring Patti a drink spiked with Paraguayan nightshade, and Patti falls unconscious.

In The Deep Bosom of the Ocean Buried - (Barbara Bush, Pauline Robinson "Robin" Bush, and Laura Bush)

Setting: Walker's Point, Kennebunkport, Maine. October 11, 2003.

Barbara Bush mourns the loss of her daughter Robin on the 50th anniversary of her death, and laments her disappointment in her son. She is joined by the deceased Robin, appearing as an adult despite her death from leukemia at the age of three, as well as her daughter-in-law Laura Bush. Barbara must decide whether to support her son George's reelection campaign, all while remembering the child she lost years ago and learning to "Let Go."

== Musical numbers ==
Act I

- "Opening" - Company
- "Out Go The Chairs / Happiness" - Pat, Julie, and Hannah
- "Ruined" - Pat, Tricia, Julie, and Hannah
- "Martha / Two Perfect Girls / Daddy's Mind" - Pat, Tricia, Julie, and Hannah
- "Why Not? / Surrender" - Pat and Hannah
- "Never Surrender" - Pat, Tricia, Julie, and Hannah
- "Mother Likes To Dance" - Betty, Susan, Amy, and Rosalynn
- "Susan Ford" - Betty, Susan, Amy, and Rosalynn
- "Fabulous Dream Adventure" - Betty, Susan, Amy, and Rosalynn
- "Iran" - Betty, Susan, Amy, and Rosalynn
- "Daughters Of" - Amy and Rosalynn
- "Everyone's Dead / Fabulous Dream Adventure (Reprise)" - Betty, Susan, Amy, and Rosalynn

Act II

- "Patti By The Pool" - Patti, Nancy, Anita
- "Anita's Song" - Anita
- "Robin / Come On Inside" - Barbara, Robin, and Laura
- "Your Big Brother George" - Barbara, Robin, and Laura
- "You, My Love" - Barbara, Robin, and Laura
- "My Beautiful Mind" - Barbara
- "Underneath the Waves" - Barbara, Robin, and Laura
- "Laura / No Tears" - Barbara, Robin, and Laura
- "Let Go / Finale" - Company

== Awards and honors ==
Year	Award	Category	Nominee	Result
2016	Drama Desk Awards	Outstanding Musical		Nominated
2016	Drama Desk Awards	Outstanding Music	Michael John LaChiusa	Nominated
2016	Drama Desk Awards	Outstanding Lyrics	Michael John LaChiusa	Nominated
2016	Drama Desk Awards	Outstanding Book of a Musical	Michael John LaChiusa	Nominated
2016	Drama Desk Awards	Outstanding Featured Actress in a Musical	Mary Testa	Nominated
2016	Drama Desk Awards	Outstanding Featured Actress in a Musical	Alison Fraser	Nominated
2016	Drama Desk Awards	Outstanding Orchestrations	Michael Starobin and Bruce Coughlin	Nominated
