= Sybille Pearson =

American playwright (born 1937)

- Born: Sybille Weiss; January 25, 1937 (age 89); Prague, Czechoslovakia
- Occupation: Playwright
- Relatives: Rainer Weiss (brother)
- Writing career
- Genre: Drama

Sybille Pearson (born January 25, 1937, in Prague, Czechoslovakia) is a playwright, musical theatre lyricist and librettist.

== Biography ==
Pearson was a graduate student in the creative writing program at the City College of New York in 1980, when her play, the two-person comedy-drama Sally and Marsha was chosen to be produced at the Playwrights Conference, Eugene O'Neill Theater Center, Waterford, Connecticut. The play was subsequently produced Off-Broadway by the Manhattan Theatre Club in 1982, and starred Bernadette Peters and Christine Baranski. The reviewer for The Associated Press wrote that "It has some well-written passages, some warm, moving moments and a goodly share of funny lines...Miss Pearson has talent, no question. But I hope someday she flees the pack of local scriveners who think West Side woe, shrinks and trips to Bloomingdale's are worth writing about."

She wrote the book for the musical Baby, which ran on Broadway in 1984, and for which she was nominated for a Tony Award.

Her play Phantasie was performed at the Vineyard Theatre in January 1989. It was called "perceptive" by Mel Gussow in his New York Times review. Her play Unfinished Stories was produced at the Mark Taper Forum (Los Angeles, California) in 1992 and by the New York Theatre Workshop in 1994. Unfinished Stories received a citation from the American Theatre Critics Association New Play Award for 1993. Pearson's play with music True History and Real Adventures was produced Off-Broadway by the Vineyard Theatre in 1999, directed by Michael Mayer and starring Kathleen Chalfant.

Pearson's plays also include Watching the Dog, Be Bold and Promise Me.

In April 2009, the Signature Theatre (Arlington, Virginia) premiered Giant, a musical adaptation of Edna Ferber's 1952 novel of the same name, with a book by Pearson and music and lyrics by Michael John LaChiusa.

Pearson once again has teamed with Michael John LaChiusa to write the book for the musical version of Rain, based on the short story "Rain" by Somerset Maugham. The musical opened on March 24, 2016, and is scheduled to run to May 1, 2016 at San Diego's Old Globe Theatre. The musical is directed by Barry Edelstein, and stars Eden Espinosa as Sadie Thompson.

== Grants and honors ==
In 1981 Pearson was one of eight playwrights to receive a grant through the Rockefeller Foundation fellowship program; the grant was $9,000 for a six-week residency at a theater of their choice.

In 2004, she was chosen for The Sundance Playwrights Retreat in The Sundance Institute Theatre Program. She was a Creative Advisor for the 2009 Sundance Institute Theatre Lab at White Oak.

== Teaching ==
Pearson is a full-time professor at the Graduate Musical Theatre Writing Program at the Tisch School of the Arts at New York University.

== Publication ==
- Phantasie Broadway Play Publishing Inc.
