= Barbara Walsh =

American actress

- Born: June 3, 1955 (age 71); Washington, D.C., U.S.
- Education: Montgomery College
- Occupation: Actress
- Spouse: Jack Cummings III

Barbara Walsh (born June 3, 1955) is an American musical theatre actress who has appeared in several prominent Broadway productions. Walsh is known for her Drama Desk Award and Tony Award nominated role as Trina in the original Broadway production of Falsettos, as well as her turn as Joanne in the 2006 Broadway Revival of Stephen Sondheim's musical Company.

== Early life ==
Walsh grew up with seven siblings in Chevy Chase, Maryland. Skilled at singing and performing impressions from a young age, she began performing in theater during high school. She attended Georgetown Visitation, an all-girls Catholic high school, and began performing in musicals at a local boys' high school. She then attended Montgomery College, where she studied drama and music. After college, Walsh worked in dinner theatre and summer stock in Warsaw, Indiana. Her voice teacher of 30 years was Margaret Riddleberger.

== Career ==
Walsh is known for her role as Trina in the Tony Award-winning original Broadway production of William Finn and James Lapine's Falsettos (1992). She first performed in the role in the production directed by Graciela Daniele at the Hartford Stage in Connecticut in 1990, the first staging of March of the Falsettos and Falsettoland as a single show. She then remained in the role when Falsettos went to Broadway. She received a Tony Award nomination, a Drama Desk Award nomination, and a Los Angeles Ovation Award for the role. She later reprised this role for the show's national tour in 1994.

Walsh previously made her Broadway debut in 1982 in the cast of musical revue Rock 'N Roll! The First 5,000 Years. She then appeared in Nine as Francesca. She also appeared on Broadway in 1993 in Blood Brothers, originating the role of Mrs. Lyons. In 1996, Walsh played Mrs. Baskin in the original production of Big. In 2002, she took over the role of Velma Von Tussle in the Broadway production of Hairspray. She played Joanne in the 2006 Tony Award-winning Broadway revival of Stephen Sondheim's Company, for which she received a Drama Desk Award nomination. This production was taped for television and aired on PBS in February 2008.

Walsh performed Off-Broadway in Forbidden Broadway in the mid-1980s, parodying figures such as Barbra Streisand and Bernadette Peters. Her other Off-Broadway credits include Birds of Paradise (1987), Stars in Your Eyes (1999), the Transport Group's Jonathan Larson Award-winning musical Normal (2005), and Transport Group's Three Days to See (2015). Later in 2015, she appeared in Michael John LaChiusa's First Daughter Suite at The Public Theater, playing the role of Pat Nixon.

Walsh's other work includes national touring productions of Oklahoma!, Les Misérables, the 1990 US tour of Chess, for which her performance as Svetlana earned her a Carbonell Award, and the 1984 national tour of Nine, in which she reprised her role as Francesca from the Broadway production.

Regionally, Walsh has been seen in Houdini in 1997 and Exactly Like You in 1998 at Goodspeed Opera House in Connecticut. She starred in Gretna Theatre's 1997 production of A Streetcar Named Desire as Blanche DuBois. Walsh replaced Donna Bullock in the role of Mother in the Chicago cast of Ragtime in 1998. She played Pfeni Rosensweig in the Wendy Wasserstein play The Sisters Rosensweig at New Jersey's George Street Playhouse in 2002. In 2006, Walsh played Joanne in John Doyle's production of Company at Cincinnati Playhouse in the Park, a role she reprised when the production later transferred to Broadway. She appeared in A Little Night Music in 2008 as Desirée Armfeldt at Center Stage in Baltimore. She played the dual roles of Edith Beale and her daughter Little Edie in Grey Gardens in 2008 at the Studio Theatre in Washington, D.C. In 2009 she played Maria Callas in Paper Mill Playhouse's Master Class. She was cast in First Wives Club at the Old Globe Theatre in 2009. She performed in Capital Repertory Theatre's 33 Variations in 2010. She starred in George Street Playhouse's 2010 production of Creating Claire. She played Sonia in Center Stage's 2014 production of Vanya and Sonia and Masha and Spike. In 2014, she played Margaret White in Studio 2ndStage's Carrie: the Musical, a role for which she won a Helen Hayes Award. In April 2016, it was announced that Walsh would join the cast of new musical Presto Change-O as part of Barrington Stage Company's 2016 season. Presto Change-O opened May 18, 2016, with Walsh playing the role of Mary. In August 2016, Walsh joined Gloucester Stage Company's production of Songs for a New World. In March 2017, Walsh portrayed Eliza Hamilton and Hillary Clinton in the Mohammed Fairouz opera The New Prince at the Dutch National Opera in Amsterdam. She played Hannah Pitt and others in the Actors Theatre of Louisville's October 2017 production of Angels in America.

Walsh's television credits include multiple guest appearances on Law & Order and Law & Order: Criminal Intent, as well as the re-occurring role of Judy Schulman-Brown on One Life to Live. Walsh also appeared in the film Life with Mikey.

== Personal life ==
Walsh is married to Jack Cummings III, the artistic director of Transport Group Theatre Company.

=== Film ===
Year	Title	Role
1993	Life With Mikey	Commercial Mother
2021	Help Me Mary	Molly

=== Television ===
Year	Title	Role	Notes
2000	As The World Turns	Candace Brenner	2 Episodes
1998-2001	Law & Order	Mrs. Lasky/Deanne Conroy	2 Episodes
2007	Great Performances	Joanne	Episode: Company: A Musical Comedy
2003-2007	Law & Order: Criminal Intent	Mrs. Roland/Ariana Cypher	2 Episodes
2007-2009	One Life to Live	Judy Schulmann-Brown	11 Episodes
2011	Submissions Only	Bridget Sante	Episode: 2/3 Memorized
2018	The Marvelous Mrs. Maisel	Fur Lecturer	Episode: We're Going to the Catskills!
2019	Madam Secretary	Secretary Angela Tuttle	Episode: The Common Defense
2025	Goosebumps	Naomi Brewer	2 Episodes

=== Stage ===
Year	Title	Role	Notes
1982	Nine	Francesca (Replacement)	46th Street Theatre, Broadway
1982	Rock 'N Roll! The First 5,000 Years	Performer	St. James Theatre, Broadway
1984	Nine	Francesca	National Tour
1987	Birds of Paradise	Stella	Promenade Theater, Off-Broadway
1988	Les Misérables	Ensemble	National Tour
1990	Chess	Svetlana	National Tour
1992	Falsettos	Trina	John Golden Theatre, Broadway
1993	Blood Brothers	Mrs. Lyons	Music Box Theatre, Broadway
1996	Big	Mrs. Baskin	Shubert Theatre, Broadway
1997	Houdini	Bess Houdini	Goodspeed Opera House
1997	A Streetcar Named Desire	Blanche DuBois	Gretna Theatre
1998	Exactly Like You	Arlene Murphy	Goodspeed Opera House
1999	Ragtime	Mother	National Tour
2002	The Sisters Rosensweig	Pfeni Rosenweig	George Street Playhouse
2004	Hairspray	Velma Von Tussle	Neil Simon Theatre, Broadway
2006	Company	Joanne	Cincinnati Playhouse in the Park
2006	Company	Joanne	Ethel Barrymore Theatre, Broadway
2008	A Little Night Music	Desiree Armfeldt	Baltimore Center Stage
2008	Grey Gardens	Edith Beale/Little Edie	Studio Theatre
2009	Master Class	Maria Callas	Paper Mill Playhouse
2010	33 Variations	Dr. Katherine Brandt	Capital Repertory Theatre
2010	Creating Claire	Claire	George Street Playhouse
2014	Vanya and Sonia and Masha and Spike	Sonia	Baltimore Center Stage
2014	Carrie	Margaret White	Second Stage Theater, Off-Broadway
2015	Three Days to See	Annie Sullivan	Transport Group, Off-Broadway
2015	First Daughter Suite	Pat Nixon	The Public Theater, Off-Broadway
2016	Presto Change-O	Mary	Barrington Stage Company
2016	Songs for a New World	Performer	Gloucester Stage Company
2017	The New Prince	Eliza Hamilton/Hillary Clinton	Dutch National Opera
2017	Angels in America	Hannah Pitt	Actors Theatre of Louisville
2018	Summer and Smoke	Mrs. Winemiller	Classic Stage Company, Off-Broadway
2019	Bonnie’s Last Flight	Jan	Fourth Street Theatre, Off-Broadway
2019	Macbeth	Ross	Classic Stage Company, Off-Broadway
2021	Oklahoma!	Aunt Eller	National Tour
2026	3Penny Opera	Polly Peachum	Theatre at St. Jean's, Off-Broadway
2026	Public Charge	Judy Gross	The Public Theater, Off-Broadway
2026	The Potluck	Mom	SoHo Rep, Off-Broadway
