= Giant (musical) =

2009 musical

- Original Off-Broadway Cast Recording
- Music: Michael John LaChiusa
- Lyrics: Michael John LaChiusa
- Book: Sybille Pearson
- Basis: Giant by Edna Ferber
- Productions: 2009 Signature Theatre; 2012 Dallas Theater Center; 2012 Off-Broadway

Giant is a musical based on the 1952 Edna Ferber novel of the same name, with music and lyrics by Michael John LaChiusa and the book by Sybille Pearson. The musical premiered at the Signature Theatre in Arlington, Virginia in 2009. The story follows a ranch family in Texas over 30 years, and the effect of the oil boom. The musical premiered off-Broadway in 2012.

== Production history and background ==
Edna Ferber's great-niece, Julie Gilbert, had approached LaChiusa about five years earlier to write a musical based on the novel Giant. LaChiusa and Pearson initially thought it impossible to stage as a musical. The novel covers decades, and has a large number of characters, with a massive backdrop in wide-open, early 20th-century Texas. "Pearson said she and LaChiusa decided to use the novel, rather than the movie, as the basis for their adaptation because 'the movie, in its own greatness, changes some of the plot.'" The Signature Theatre commissioned LaChiusa to write the musical as the first installment in its American Musical Voices Project.

Jonathan Butterell directed the world premiere production in Signature's MAX theatre, where it ran from April 28 through May 31, 2009. The ranch family was played by Lewis Cleale (Bick) and Betsy Morgan (Leslie), Ashley Robinson was Jett, the young ranch hand who finds oil, with Michele Pawk as Luz, Bick's older sister and John Dossett as Uncle Bawley, Marisa Echeverria as Juana, the Mexican wife, Jordan Nichols as Bick's son Jordy Jr, and Andres Quintero as Angel, son of Mexican American laborers.

The show closely follows the novel, rejecting the many plot changes that were made for the classic 1956 film of the same name starring Elizabeth Taylor, Rock Hudson, and James Dean.

The music displays various musical styles from Mexican folk to country to rock 'n' roll, jazz and mariachi.

A reading of the musical was held in New York City on January 10, 2011, with Kate Baldwin, Michael Esper, Steven Pasquale and Tom Wopat and directed by Michael Greif.

The Dallas Theater Center, in a co-production with the Public Theater, presented the musical, with performances starting on January 18, 2012, in previews and running through February 19, with direction again by Greif. The cast featured Kate Baldwin (Leslie), Aaron Lazar (Bick), P.J. Griffith (Jett), John Dossett (Bawley) and Dee Hoty (Luz). The musical originally was written with three acts and two intermissions, but for the Dallas production, it was re-written to have two acts and one intermission.

The musical then premiered off-Broadway at the Public Theater running from October 26 to December 16, 2012 (the engagement was originally scheduled through December 2, 2012). Most of the Dallas cast returned while Michele Pawk and Brian d'Arcy James took over the roles of Luz and Bick respectively. The first post–New York production took place at Illinois Wesleyan University in November 2015.

== Synopsis ==
In Texas in 1922, Jordan "Bick" Benedict, a rich cattleman, marries Leslie, from Virginia. Bick is focused on working the family ranch, Reatta, but exhibits bigotry against Mexicans. This racism is seen in his older sister, Luz, who is against outsiders. Jett Rink is a handyman but discovers oil; he is infatuated with Leslie. A neighbor and Bick's reclusive uncle, Uncle Bawley, tells the tale of the legend of the coyote. Bick ends the relationship with a girlfriend, Vashti.

As they age over the years, Leslie feels rejected by Bick and realizes that they do not really know each other. Leslie and Bick's son marries a Mexican woman as Leslie tries to help the downtrodden Mexican American workers and Bick comes to accept his son's choice.

== Songs ==
Act I

- "Aurelia Dolores" – Polo, Lupe and Company
- "Did Spring Come to Texas?" – Bick and Ensemble
- "Did Spring Come to Texas?" (Reprise) – Bick
- "Your Texas" – Leslie and Bick
- "No Time for Surprises" – Luz
- "Private Property" – Jett
- "Lost" – Leslie and Mexicans
- "Elsie Mae" – Jett
- "He Wanted a Girl" – Vashti and Bick
- "Heartbreak Country" – Bick and Leslie
- "Ruega por Nosotros" – Lupe and Servants
- "Look Back" / "Look Ahead" – Bawley, Bick, Leslie and Company
- "My Texas" – Bick, Vashti, Pinkie, Adarene, Mike, Leslie and Company
- "Topsy-Turvy" – Leslie and Bick
- "When to Bluff" / "One Day" – Jett, Lil Luz and Men
- "A Stranger" – Leslie
- "Act One Finale" – Bick, Jett, Bawley and Company

Act II

- "Our Mornings" / "That Thing" – Bick and Luz
- "Jump" – Angel, Lil Luz and Bobby Jr.
- "There is a Child" – Juana and Jordy
- "Un Béso, Béso!" – Polo, Lupe, Angel, Analita, Luz and Company
- "A Place in the World" / "Look Ahead" (Reprise) – Bawley and Bick
- "Midnight Blues" – Vashti and Leslie
- "The Dog is Gonna Bark" – Jett
- "Juana's Prayer" – Juana
- "Aurelia Dolores" (Reprise) / "Act Two Finale" – Jordy, Juana and Company

== Critical response ==
The show received mostly positive reviews, hedged by concerns over its length (3 hours, 45 minutes) and the nontraditional use of three acts -- in the later production at the Public Theater, the length was cut considerably and the show was reduced to two acts.

Terry Teachout of The Wall Street Journal gave the Public production an unqualified rave. He called it "the most important new musical to come along since The Light in the Piazza", and stated that LaChiusa and Adam Guettel of Piazza were "the two most prodigiously gifted musical-theater songwriters to come along since Stephen Sondheim".

Peter Marks of The Washington Post wrote: "...the composer, Michael John LaChiusa, has written for this world premiere some of the lithest, most dramatically compelling music of his career. And that his collaborator, librettist Sybille Pearson, brings to the stage some potent Lone Star State characters... At its epic length, it becomes an advanced-placement sort of musical — more for the ardent enthusiast than the casual entertainment-seeker."

The Variety reviewer noted that the "inventive score is filled with pleasant melodies that hark to the old West, along with more soaring operatic pieces". However, he felt that "the show is humorless and sometimes incoherent. There are choppy, unconnected scenes, especially in the dark and leaden third act. Meanwhile, pivotal highlights such as a principal character's life-changing oil gusher are presented in retrospect, robbing the story of needed spark and surely confusing anyone unfamiliar with the Ferber yarn."

== Awards and nominations ==
The musical received eight Drama Desk Award nominations: Outstanding Musical, Outstanding Actor in a Musical (Brian d’Arcy James), Outstanding Actress in a Musical (Kate Baldwin), Outstanding Music, Outstanding Lyrics, Outstanding Book of a Musical, Outstanding Orchestrations (Bruce Coughlin), and Outstanding Sound Design in a Musical. The play received a nomination by the Outer Critics Circle Award for Outstanding New Off-Broadway Musical.

== Recording ==
A two-disc cast album of the musical was released on the Ghostlight label in 2013.
