= Marie Christine =

Musical

- Original cast recording
- Music: Michael John LaChiusa
- Lyrics: Michael John LaChiusa
- Book: Michael John LaChiusa
- Basis: Medea by Euripides
- Productions: 1999 Broadway

Marie Christine is a musical with music, lyrics, and book by Michael John LaChiusa. It opened on Broadway in 1999. While loosely based on the Greek play Medea, it is set in the 1890s, in New Orleans and Chicago, and draws heavily on the biographies of (and the mythology about) a historical mother and daughter, both named Marie Laveau, who were famous practitioners of voodoo.

== Development ==
Following the success of Michael John LaChiusa's 1993 musical Hello Again, which premiered at Lincoln Center Theater directed by Graciela Daniele, LaChiusa and Daniele decided to develop a new musical work based on a classic text for Audra McDonald (who won her first Tony Award in the acclaimed 1994 Broadway revival of Rodgers and Hammerstein's Carousel, produced by Lincoln Center Theater). The musical was in development for three and a half years and was workshopped a handful of times before its initial staging. When a production was eventually mounted, it was at the Vivian Beaumont Theater, where it followed Parade - another large, new musical created at LCT and written by a young composer, Jason Robert Brown. Both works shared similar themes and stories of racism, misogyny, and redemption in the American South.

== Productions ==
One of the last new musicals to open in the 20th century, it opened on Broadway at the Vivian Beaumont Theater of Lincoln Center Theater on December 2, 1999 in a limited run and closed on January 9, 2000 after 42 performances and 39 previews. Directed and choreographed by Graciela Daniele, it starred Audra McDonald as Marie Christine, Anthony Crivello as Dante Keyes, Vivian Reed as Marie Christine's voodoo priestess mother, Mary Testa as Magdalena, and Lovette George as Celeste. While billed initially as a limited run by Lincoln Center Theater, any chance of further extension of the production was severed with the theater's announcement that the musical "dance play" Contact would transfer to the Beaumont from the smaller, Off-Broadway Mitzi E. Newhouse Theater in March 2000. Contact would go on to play 1,010 performances and win the Tony Award for Best Musical in 2000.

The production was nominated for several Tony Awards, including Best Book of a Musical (LaChiusa), Best Score (LaChiusa), and Best Leading Actress in a Musical (McDonald). An original Broadway cast album was released by RCA Victor following the show's closing.

Columbia Stages presented the first New York City revival of the piece. Directed by Raymond Zilberberg, it ran from March 6 through March 9 of 2013 in a raw space at 3LD Technology and Art Center.

== Synopsis ==
Prelude (A Prison)

In New Orleans in 1899, Marie Christine, a racially mixed woman, is in prison without a trial to face death. The prisoners ask her to tell her story ("Before the Morning"). Three of the prisoners, acting as a Greek chorus, follow her as she tells of her mother, also named Marie Christine, who was a practitioner of voodoo magic and used it to help people who believed in the craft ("Mamzell' Marie"). Her mother warned her that although they know magic, they are still human and can make great mistakes ("Ton Grandpère est le Soleil (Your Grandfather Is the Sun)")

Act I (1894)

In 1894, Marie meets Dante Keyes at Blue Rose Park on Lake Pontchartrain, just outside of New Orleans ("Beautiful"). She is instantly drawn to him, although he is a white sea captain who, while charming, is often rude ("In An Instant").

Marie tells him of her two brothers, Jean and Paris, who are her caretakers since both her parents are dead. Their mother is held in low esteem in the brothers' eyes, due to her use of magic, which they disapprove of. Their white father left their mother and had Paris and Jean work as his servants, which made them quite wealthy. The brothers also have care of the dowry left to Marie, and they want her to marry a man worthy of her. Marie feels trapped by them. Jean is having a party later in the month to celebrate his engagement to Beatrice, a woman of class and stature befitting a man of his social standing. Both brothers are leaving for a month to resolve other matters. After they leave, Marie confides in her maid, Lisette, that women can control men if they know how ("Way Back to Paradise").

Marie is increasingly enthralled by Dante ("When You Look At a Man"), who arrogantly tells of his skills as a sea captain ("The Storm"). His ship being driven off course by a storm, its cargo of fruit has spoiled due to the time lost. He is trying to get the money he and his crew are owed, and Marie offers to get it for him. She reveals her magic and how, like her mother, she helps those who ask her for her services ("C'est L'Amour" / "To Find a Lover"). Dante is skeptical of magic, and tells her of his travels ("Nothing Beats Chicago"). Marie has never left New Orleans and wishes to explore the world. In a rare moment of vulnerability, Dante reveals the loneliness of life at sea, although when he is on land, he hears the ocean calling to him ("Ocean Is Different"). To cover up his inner feelings, Dante tells Marie of his sexual exploits, and as they dance, he seduces her and they make love in the park ("Danced With a Girl"). Lisette attempts to find Marie ("Tout Mi Mi") and Marie realizes that Dante could be her means of escaping her confining life. An apparition of her mother warns her of the dangers of giving into her passions ("Miracles and Mysteries"). Lisette discovers Marie and Dante together ("Tout Mi Mi (Reprise)") and Marie sharply orders her away. Marie invites Dante to live in her guest house while her brothers are away, and Dante reveals that he can no longer hear the ocean calling to him, as he has fallen in love with Marie ("I Don't Hear the Ocean").

A month later, Marie's servants gossip in code about Dante ("Bird Inside the House"). Paris and Jean return home and confront Marie about Dante. The town is abuzz with the scandal, and they implore her to send him away. She refuses, and Paris harshly reminds her of how their own father forced them to be servants. Paris leaves, and, alone with Marie, Jean pleads with his sister ("All Eyes Look Upon You"). She agrees to his wishes and rushes out.

Lisette walks in on the servants gossiping about Dante's imminent departure and Marie's newly-discovered pregnancy. As the servants leave, Dante corners Lisette and attempts to seduce her ("Danced With a Girl (Reprise)"). As Lisette, attempting to foil Dante's advances, reveals (in French) Marie's pregnancy, Marie walks in, commands Lisette to leave, and tells Dante (who, not understanding French, still does not know that Marie is carrying his child) that he must take her with him. He initially refuses, but she reveals that she has the key to Jean's study, where her dowry is kept, so Dante agrees to bring the ship closer and return on the night of Jean's engagement party, when they will steal the money and escape to Chicago ("We're Gonna Go to Chicago"). That night, Marie finds Lisette ("Never Fall Under the Spell" / "Dansez Calinda") and vengefully casts a spell that kills her. Marie is completely in love with Dante and will do anything for him ("And You Would Lie" / "I Will Give").

At the engagement party, Marie and Dante are caught and Paris and Jean beat Dante. To save him, Marie stabs and kills Paris. Marie and Dante escape to the docks, and as they sail away, Marie wordlessly reveals that she is pregnant ("Finale of Act I").

Act II (1899)

Marie and Dante now have two boys and have been sailing happily along the Eastern seaboard for five years ("Opening (Five Years Up and Down the Coast)" / "I Will Love You"). They finally start a home in Chicago, where Dante, always ambitious, becomes interested in entering politics. At a brothel run by Magdalena ("Cincinnati"), Dante, advised by political boss Charles Gates, campaigns for the position of alderman ("You're Looking at the Man").

Dante leaves Marie and becomes engaged to Charles Gates' daughter Helena. Dante wants to have custody of his children, but Marie will not allow it ("The Scorpion"). Dante wants Marie to leave Chicago, telling her that she will be well provided for. Marie has nowhere to go - she has killed her brother and has left her mark in New York due to Dante's gambling. She reveals how she cast a spell on the daughters of the man who cheated Dante to make them kill their father ("Lover Bring Me Summer"). Dante will not return to her, so she reminds him of her enduring love and her magic, which she can use for him or against him ("Tell Me").

Magdalena meets Marie ("Billy Was Sweet" / "There's a Rumor Going Round") and offers to help her. Marie refuses her, but Magdalena advises her to give up her children now to give her more options. Magdalena can help Marie keep her boys if Marie will help Magdalena conceive a child, which she and her husband have been unable to do ("Paradise Is Burning Down"). That night, Marie uses her magic to entangle herself with Dante and Helena - although she is not physically there, they can feel her and they engage in a dangerous ménage-à-trois ("Prison In a Prison"). Charles Gates' workers find Marie at her home and tell her she must leave ("Better and Best"). Gates himself soon appears and, using force, convinces Marie to give her boys to him ("Good Looking Woman"). Marie is worried her children will end up servants like her brothers and decides to take Magdalena up on her offer ("You Can Taste the Blood").

Marie is haunted by her family and Lisette, who tell her she has gone too far ("No Turning Back") and cannot return ("Silver Mimosa" / "Before the Morning (Reprise)"). Marie meets Dante and asks him to allow the boys to give Helena a wedding gift to show how well-brought-up they are. She admits that she will always love him, and that she is doomed to life alone, reliving her past and unable to change it ("Beautiful (Reprise)"). The boys will return to her after the wedding to say goodbye before they start their new life with Dante.

Magdalena arrives with the boys and recounts the wedding ("A Lovely Wedding"). Marie gives her a gift that will allow her to conceive. Magdalena tells Marie that she has friends with whom Marie can stay, and that the boys will be brought to her within the month. Before they return to Dante, Marie wishes to bathe them, and she sings them a farewell lullaby. ("I Will Love You (Reprise)"). Dante runs in and reveals that the present Marie had given Helena turned out to be cursed and burned her alive ("Your Name"). Marie returns and Dante begs for his boys. He discovers that Marie has killed them. Horrified, Magdalena throws Marie's magic gift to the ground and runs away.

Back at the prison, Marie's mother is heard, followed by the prisoners, who tell Marie that innocence has died by her hand. As dawn arrives, Marie's mother asks, “Is love too small a pain for a woman?”. Marie Christine walks towards the rising light and into the burning sun ("Finale of Act II").

== Songs ==
Prelude (A Prison)

- "Before the Morning" – Women
- "Mamzell' Marie" – Marie Christine and Company
- "Ton Grandpère est le Soleil (Your Grandfather Is the Sun)" – Marie Christine's Mother

Act I (1894)

- "Beautiful" – Marie Christine
- "In An Instant" - Prisoners
- "Way Back to Paradise" – Marie Christine and Lisette
- "When You Look At a Man" - Prisoners
- "The Storm" – Dante Keyes
- "C'est L'Amour" / "To Find a Lover" – Marie Christine and Company
- "Nothing Beats Chicago" / "Ocean is Different" / "Danced with a Girl" – Dante Keyes
- "Tout Mi Mi" – Lisette
- "Miracles and Mysteries" – Marie Christine's Mother and Prisoners
- "Tout Mi Mi" (Reprise) - Lisette
- "I Don't Hear the Ocean" – Dante Keyes and Marie Christine
- "Bird Inside the House" – Maids and Valets
- "All Eyes Look Upon You" – Jean L'Adrese
- "A Month Ago He Comes Here" – Maids
- "Danced With a Girl" (Reprise) – Dante
- "We're Gonna Go to Chicago" – Dante Keyes and Marie Christine
- "Dansez Calinda" – Lisette
- "And You Would Lie" - Prisoners
- "I Will Give" – Marie Christine and Prisoners
- "Finale of Act I" – Paris L'Adrese and Company

Act II (1899)

- "Opening (Five Years Up and Down the Coast)" / "I Will Love You" – Prisoners, Dante Keyes and Marie Christine
- "Cincinnati" – Magdalena and Daughters
- "You're Looking at the Man" – Leary, McMahon, Dante Keyes and Company
- "The Scorpion" – Dante Keyes and Marie Christine
- "Lover Bring Me Summer" – Olivia Parker and Grace Parker
- "Tell Me" – Marie Christine
- "Billy Was Sweet" / "There's A Rumor Going Round" - Magdalena
- "Paradise is Burning Down" – Magdalena
- "Prison in a Prison" – Marie Christine, Prisoners, Helena and Dante Keyes
- "Better and Best" – Leary and McMahon
- "Good Looking Woman" – Gates, Leary and McMahon
- "You Can Taste the Blood" - Prisoners
- "No Turning Back" – Paris, Mother, Jean and Lisette
- "Silver Mimosa" / "Before the Morning" (Reprise) - Lisette, Marie Christine's Mother, Paris, Jean, and Prisoners
- "Beautiful" (Reprise) – Marie Christine
- "A Lovely Wedding" – Magdalena
- "I Will Love You" (Reprise) – Marie Christine
- "Your Name" – Dante Keyes
- "Finale of Act II" – Women

== Instrumentation ==
The Tony-nominated original production was orchestrated by Jonathan Tunick for 17 musicians.

- Strings: 2 Violins, 1 Viola, 1 Cello, 1 Double Bass
- Brass: 2 Trumpets, 2 French Horns, 1 Cornet
- Keyboards: 1 Piano
- Woodwinds: Reed 1: Flute, Bb Clarinet, Piccolo, Alto Flute, Soprano Saxophone
- Reed 2: Bb, Eb & A Clarinet
- Reed 3: Bb Clarinet, Oboe, English Horn
- Reed 4: Bassoon, Bass Clarinet, Flute, Bb Clarinet
- Percussion: (2 Players)
- On-stage percussion: Kalimba, Caxixi, Shakers, Bones, Bamboo, Clic Clak, Floor Bells, Legs, Ashiko, Bells, Bell Chimes, Rattle, Sleigh Bell, Chime, Ciyes, Talking Drum, Vibratone in C, Vibratone in E

== Response ==
The production received mixed reviews.

Ben Brantley wrote in The New York Times: "When Audra McDonald sings her first notes as the Medea-like heroine of Marie Christine, Michael John LaChiusa's solemn, sometimes somnolent musical tragedy at Lincoln Center, there is clearly sorcery at work.... Marie Christine ... is a resounding confirmation of Ms. McDonald's status as a vocal artist of singular skills and sensibility.... As a musical portrait of an individual, Marie Christine is stunning; as a compelling, complete production, it still feels oddly unfinished. Despite ravishing orchestrations by Jonathan Tunick, the score rarely achieves much momentum or intensity on its own, and its recurrent motifs don't haunt the imagination as they should."

Michael Feingold, reviewing for the Village Voice, wrote: "Proficient, skilled, and imaginative, LaChiusa marshals an enormous panoply of approaches to tell his tale, but it doesn't hold together, even with the towering talent of Audra McDonald at its center, because the myth won't supply what he needs from it; his constantly shifting strategies only diffuse it further. Though LaChiusa's blurry conception is often conveyed in equally blurry lyrics, his music, with its constant restless invention, probably deserves a fairer hearing than it gets here. More than any new score I've heard recently, it wants unplugging."

== Awards and nominations ==
=== Original Broadway production ===
Year	Award Ceremony	Category	Nominee	Result
2000	Tony Award	Best Book of a Musical	Michael John LaChiusa	Nominated
2000	Tony Award	Best Original Score	Michael John LaChiusa	Nominated
2000	Tony Award	Best Performance by a Leading Actress in a Musical	Audra McDonald	Nominated
2000	Tony Award	Best Lighting Design	Jules Fisher and Peggy Eisenhauer	Nominated
2000	Tony Award	Best Orchestrations	Jonathan Tunick	Nominated
2000	Drama Desk Award	Outstanding Actress in a Musical	Audra McDonald	Nominated
