= Mary Testa =

American actress

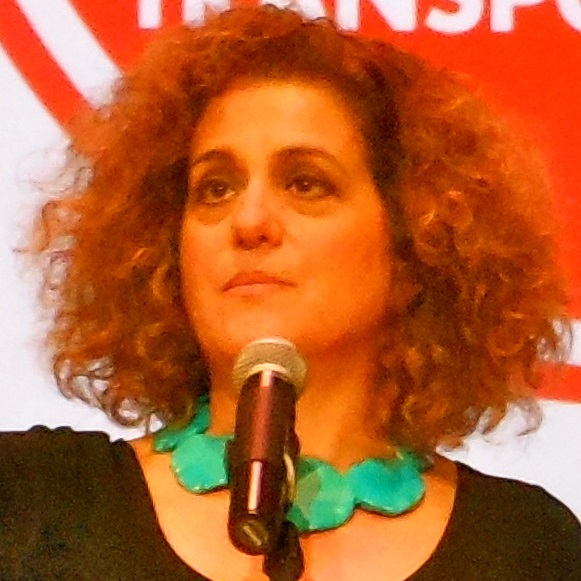
- Testa at Gimme a Break Gala, December 2011
- Born: Philadelphia, Pennsylvania, U.S.
- Education: University of Rhode Island
- Occupation: Actress
- Years active: 1979–present

Mary Testa is an American stage and film actress. She is a three-time Tony Award nominee, for performances in revivals of Leonard Bernstein's On the Town (1998), 42nd Street (2001) and Oklahoma (2019).

== Early life ==
Testa was born in Philadelphia and has one sister. At age four, her family moved to Rhode Island. She studied acting at the University of Rhode Island. Testa left school to move to New York in 1976 to pursue a performing career.

== Stage ==
Testa made her debut Off-Broadway at Playwrights Horizons as Miss Goldberg in William Finn's one-act musical In Trousers (1979), part one of his "Marvin Trilogy." She next performed in Finn's March of the Falsettos, and later in Company, at Playwrights.

Her Broadway roles include Joyce Heth in Barnum (1982), movie columnist Hedda Hopper in Marilyn: An American Fable (1983), Angel in The Rink (1984), Domina in A Funny Thing Happened on the Way to the Forum (1996–1997), Madame Dilly in On the Town (1998), Magdalena in Marie Christine, Maggie Jones in 42nd Street (2001–2002), the Matron in Chicago (2005), Melpomene in Xanadu (2007–2008), General Matilda B. Cartwright in Guys and Dolls (2009), Madame Morrible in Wicked (2014), and Aunt Eller in Oklahoma! (2019).

She is a frequent collaborator with such acclaimed musical dramatists as William Finn (Infinite Joy, A New Brain, In Trousers) and Michael John LaChiusa (Marie Christine, See What I Wanna See, First Lady Suite), while also having appeared in the works of Stephen Sondheim, Kander & Ebb, Flaherty & Ahrens, and Leonard Bernstein, among other Off-Broadway and regional theatre credits. She also frequently performs in concerts and cabaret shows.

On December 28, 2020, it was announced that Testa would star as Skinner in a benefit concert presentation of Ratatouille the Musical, an internet meme that originated on TikTok, inspired by the 2007 Disney/Pixar film. The concert streamed exclusively on TodayTix on January 1, 2021.

== Film, television and recording ==
Testa made her film debut in Going in Style (1979), and has appeared in numerous movie and television roles since, including Sophia in the 2003 sitcom Whoopi, Zia Maria Luisa in the 2014 film Big Stone Gap, and Sister Clare in the 2004 film adaptation of Tony n' Tina's Wedding. She also appeared in such films as The Business of Strangers (2001), Stay (2005), Eat Pray Love (2010), The Bounty Hunter (2010) and the TV series Law & Order, Whoopi's Littleburg, 2 Broke Girls, Smash, White Collar, Cosby, Sex and the City, and Life on Mars.

From 1999 to 2002, she appeared frequently as the voice of Shirley the Medium on Courage the Cowardly Dog.

In addition to her show albums, Testa and Michael Starobin released an album, Have Faith, in 2014. It contains contemporary interpretations of songs by artists such as Alanis Morissette, Prince, The Beach Boys, Leonard Cohen, Finn and LaChiusa.

== Selected stage credits ==
Year	Title	Role	Theatre
1979	In Trousers	Miss Goldberg	Playwrights Horizons, Off-Broadway
1984	The Rink	Angel Antonelli (standby/replacement)	Martin Beck Theater, Broadway
1988	Lucky Stiff	Rita La Porta	Playwrights Horizons, Off-Broadway
1996	A Funny Thing Happened on the Way to the Forum	Domina	St. James Theater, Broadway
1997	On the Town	Madame Maude P. Dilly	Delacorte Theatre, The Public Theater, Off-Broadwa
1998	On the Town	Madame Maude P. Dilly	Gershwin Theatre, Broadway
1998	A New Brain	Lisa	Mitzi E. Newhouse Theatre, Off-Broadway
1999	Marie Christine	Magdalena	Vivian Beaumont Theater, Broadway
1999	Ziegfeld Follies of 1936	Fanny Brice	Encores! Production, New York City Center, Off-Broadway
2000	Tartuffe	Dorine	Delacorte Theatre, The Public Theater, Off-Broadway
2001	42nd Street	Maggie Jones	Ford Center for the Performing Arts, Broadway
2003	String of Pearls	Various Roles	
2003	Lucky Stiff	Rita La Porta	
2004	First Lady Suite	Lorena Hickock	The Connelly Theatre, Off-Broadway
2005	Chicago	Matron "Mamma" Morton	Ambassador Theatre, Broadway
2006	See What I Wanna See	The Medium/Aunt Monica	The Public Theater, Off-Broadway
2007	Xanadu	Melpomene	Hayes Theater, Broadway
2009	Guys and Dolls	General Cartwright	Nederlander Theatre, Broadway
2010	Love, Loss, and What I Wore	Performer	
2011	Queen of the Mist	Anna Edson Taylor	The Gym at Judson Memorial Church, Off-Broadway
2014	Wicked	Madame Morrible	Gershwin Theatre, Broadway
2016	First Daughter Suite	Barbara Bush	Anspacher Theatre, The Public Theater, Off-Broadway
2018	Oklahoma!	Aunt Eller	St. Ann's Warehouse, Off-Broadway
2019	Oklahoma!	Aunt Eller	Circle in the Square Theater, Broadway
2020–2021	Ratatouille: The Musical	Chef Skinner	Online Production
2023	Oliver!	Widow Corney	Encores! Production, New York City Center, Off-Broadway
2023	The Gardens of Anuncia	Granmama Magdalena	Mitzi E. Newhouse Theatre, Off-Broadway
2025	Night Side Songs	Desirée	Under the Radar Festival at Lincoln Center, Philadelphia Theatre Company, American Repertory Theater

== Selected concert appearances ==
- Broadway Unplugged 2004 ("Hard-Hearted Hannah: The Vamp of Savannah")
- Broadway Unplugged 2005 ("The Thrill is Gone")
- The Broadway Musicals of 1930 ("I Happen to Like New York" and "My First Love—My Last Love")
- The Broadway Musicals of 1933 ("I'll Be Hard to Handle" and "Harlem on My Mind")

== Awards and nominations ==
Year	Award	Category	Work	Result	Ref.
1999	Tony Award	Best Featured Actress in a Musical	On The Town	Nominated	
2001	Tony Award	Best Featured Actress in a Musical	42nd Street	Nominated	
2001	Outer Critics Circle Award	Outstanding Featured Actress in a Musical	42nd Street	Nominated	
2004	Drama Desk Award	Outstanding Featured Actress in a Musical	First Lady Suite	Nominated	
2005	Drama Desk Award	Outstanding Featured Actress in a Play	String of Pearls	Nominated	
2006	Drama Desk Award	Outstanding Featured Actress in a Musical	See What I Wanna See	Nominated	
2008	Drama Desk Award	Outstanding Featured Actress in a Musical	Xanadu	Nominated	
2012	Drama Desk Award	Special Award	Queen of the Mist	Won	
2016	Drama Desk Award	Outstanding Featured Actress in a Musical	First Daughter Suite	Nominated	
2016	Irvine International Film Festival	Best Actress	The Mother	Nominated	
2016	Maverick Movie Awards	Best Actress: Short	The Mother	Won	
2016	Melbourne Indie Film Festival	Best Actress in a Short	The Mother	Won	
2016	Portsmouth International Film Festival	Leading Actress in a Short	The Mother	Nominated	
2016	Wild Rose Independent Film Festival	Best Actress - Short Film	The Mother	Won	
2018	Outer Critics Circle Award	Outstanding Featured Actress in a Play	The Government Inspector	Nominated	
2019	Tony Award	Best Featured Actress in a Musical	Oklahoma!	Nominated	
2019	Drama Desk Award	Outstanding Featured Actress in a Musical	Oklahoma!	Nominated	
2020	Grammy Award	Best Musical Theater Album	Oklahoma!	Nominated	
2026	Lucille Lortel Award	Outstanding Ensemble	Night Side Songs	Won	
