= Baby (musical) =

- Original Broadway poster
- Music: David Shire
- Lyrics: Richard Maltby, Jr.
- Book: Sybille Pearson
- Productions: 1983 Broadway; 2004 Manila; 2011 Brazil; 2019 Off-Broadway

Baby is a musical with a book by Sybille Pearson, based on a story developed with Susan Yankowitz, music by David Shire, and lyrics by Richard Maltby Jr. It concerns the reactions of three couples each expecting a child. The musical first ran on Broadway from 1983 to 1984.

== Plot ==
=== Act I ===
Lizzie and Danny are a young couple still in college living together, and Danny is a musician. Alan and Arlene are a couple in their 40s who have just come back home after a trip together. Pam and Nick are a young couple in their thirties who want a baby more than anything. The couples sing a song about hopeful change for the future and how the year is passing by. Lizzie, Arlene and Pam all go to the doctor for different reasons- Lizzie thinks she has the flu, Arlene has a check-up, and Pam has missed her period again. At the doctor's office, each couple finds out the woman is pregnant ("We Start Today").

Danny decides if Lizzie is to keep the baby, they must get married, which Lizzie does not agree with. They then sing a song about how their child will be a perfect mix of both of them ("What Could Be Better?"). While exercising together, Arlene tells Alan that she has been pregnant for about a month. While singing, they surmise that she must have gotten pregnant on their anniversary trip the night they both had too much champagne. Alan is ecstatic about having the child, while Arlene seems unsure. Meanwhile, Pam and Nick are ecstatic that Pam is finally pregnant. They sing to their unborn child about how loved it will be and how they will do everything for him or her. Arlene and Alan reminisce about their past. The three couples then sing together about the babies they are to have and how they will love them ("Baby, Baby, Baby").

Lizzie, Pam and Arlene are all seated in a doctor's office. Pam shows off the basketball she has received from her team at the baby shower they gave her. She tells Lizzie and Arlene about how excited she is to be pregnant. They then discover that all three of them are pregnant. They all speak to one another about their excitements, concerns and wisdom about having children. Pam then sings about how she wants to experience everything while pregnant, from stretch marks to morning sickness. Lizzie agrees with her, but Arlene seems to think having everything is not possible, until she suddenly blurts out that it is also her fantasy to "have it all" as a mother ("I Want it All").

Danny laments to Nick about how Lizzie doesn't want to marry him, and Nick replies by saying that he has to give Lizzie some space and let her thrive, because at the end of the night she will always come back to Danny. A concerned nurse calls Pam in to view her test results. After Danny and Nick sing some more, Pam comes out of the test room and reveals that she has just been told she isn't pregnant, and that the test results belonged to a relative of Nick's. She is devastated, and Nick tries to comfort her as she cries in his arms.

Danny tries again to convince Lizzie to marry him, but she still refuses. He says he wants to take a job with a band that he doesn't really like, but he is willing to do so to support the child. Lizzie doesn't want him to, but he wants to help support the child. Pam and Nick go to a specialist to figure out why Pam isn't able to get pregnant. However, the doctor has a problem with his contact lenses and an impatient Pam is distraught when he reveals that it's not Pam's irregular cycle that is preventing pregnancy, but rather Nick's abnormal sperm. The doctor tells them that in order for Pam and Nick to have a child, their sex life must be by the book, which they eagerly agree to. Later, at a faculty vs. student softball game, Nick is annoyed that the only topic people seem interested in discussing is children. He is still upset from the meeting with the doctor.

The men (not Nick) sing about the "fatherhood blues" and what it's like to be expecting a child. Nick sings about how it seems unfair that everyone except him is able to have children, but then joins in singing with the others in hopeful spirits about the excitement of expecting a child. Alan and Arlene further discuss the idea of having the baby. Arlene openly expresses her doubts to Alan and he seems shocked and upset. However, they drop the matter quickly and go to bed.

At a bus station, Lizzie and Danny are parting ways as he leaves for his summer job with the band. Pam and Nick begin discussing their new sex ritual prescribed by the doctor. Alan and Arlene have someone look at their house so they can sell it and live in a small apartment with just the two of them, meaning they aren't going to have the baby after all. Danny proposes to Lizzie again at the train station before he leaves, and sings to her as a farewell ("I Chose Right"). Arlene then reveals to Alan that she wants to keep the baby and they shouldn't sell the house after all.

Now living alone, Lizzie feels the baby kick in her stomach for the very first time. She tries to call and tell both Danny and mother in excitement, however she is unable to reach either of them by phone. She has a sudden revelation that this child will live after she is gone, and that life will just keep going, and that her child may have a child, and so on, and that her family is her purpose now ("The Story Goes On").

=== Act II ===
Lizzie is seated on a park bench and many women approach her, touch her stomach and ask her about her pregnancy, which she finds uncomfortably personal and strange. She sings about how it seems to happen to her wherever she goes ("The Ladies Singin' Their Song"). After Lizzie leaves the park bench, Arlene enters and sits there, singing about how she feels her life is just an endless cycle of patterns and that life is slipping away from her while she goes nowhere ("Patterns").

Meanwhile, Pam and Nick continue the methods the doctor recommended to them, one of which includes Pam's feet being raised in the air for an hour at a time. Nick reads to her to help pass the time. They sing of the sexual ritual they must follow, and they both reveal that they never knew love could be this much work. Time passes, and they are still following the same ritual. Pam is uncomfortable and sick of repeating the ritual. Nick seems irritable and has lost his sense of humor, especially when Pam says she needs to break the ritual and get up from her position. She sings about how she misses the love in her relationship and she feels that everything has become too routine and that everything revolves around trying to have a baby with Nick. She misses the romance they once had. Nick then reveals he feels the same way, and says that they're not going to do the ritual anymore since it is not making either of them happy. At dinner, Arlene and Alan discuss how Arlene feels that they aren't a couple, but parents. She feels they're only together for the kids and goes up to bed. Alan sings about how much easier it is to take care of and love kids than it is to care for and love a wife.

Time passes and Danny returns home to Lizzie, where she has decorated the apartment to look very "homey". Lizzie then tells Danny that she really does want to marry him and sings of a vision she has. Danny joins in and they sing of the intensity of their love ("Two People in Love"). Meanwhile, Arlene and Alan seem to be in some kind of quarrel and Arlene has her bags packed to leave. Pam and Nick have a failed attempt at love-making and are both disappointed. They get into a small fight, then both realize that having a child isn't worth them fighting, because they ultimately love each other more than anything ("With You"). Alan and Arlene further discuss their marriage, and how they feel everything they've done has been for the kids rather than for each other. They question if they ever really did love each other, and end up realizing how great they could be together if they really did love each other in the ways they wanted to, and share a kiss ("And What if We Had Loved Like That").

Lizzie begins having contractions three weeks early and she and Danny go to the hospital. Pam and Nick continue trying to have a child, and say that even if it takes years, they want to keep trying. Lizzie finally gives birth, and Alan and Arlene smile at the birth in anticipation of what is to come. Pam and Nick are also at the birth, and they seem jealous, but hopeful ("The Birth/Finale").

== Musical numbers ==
Act I

- Opening/We Start Today – Danny, Lizzie, Alan, Arlene, Nick, Pam, People in the Town
- What Could Be Better? – Danny, Lizzie
- The Plaza Song – Alan, Arlene
- Baby, Baby, Baby – Nick, Pam, Alan, Arlene, Danny, Lizzie
- I Want It All – Pam, Lizzie, Arlene
- At Night She Comes Home To Me – Nick, Danny
- What Could Be Better? (Reprise) – Danny, Lizzie
- Fatherhood Blues – Danny, Alan, Nick, Mr. Weiss and Dean
- Romance – Nick, Pam
- I Chose Right – Danny
- We Start Today (Reprise) – Company
- The Story Goes On – Lizzie

Act II

- The Ladies Singin' Their Song – Lizzie, Women in the Town
- Patterns – Arlene
- Baby, Baby, Baby (Reprise) – Arlene*
- Romance (Reprise) – Nick, Pam
- Easier to Love – Alan
- The End of Summer - Lizzie, Arlene, Pam**
- Two People In Love – Danny, Lizzie
- With You – Nick, Pam***
- And What If We Had Loved Like That – Alan, Arlene***
- We Start Today (Reprise) – Danny, Lizzie, Nick, Pam, Alan, Arlene
- The Story Goes On (Reprise) – Company

"Baby, Baby, Baby (Reprise)" was replaced in the initial run and the original cast recording with the song "Patterns," wherein Arlene contemplates her circular life as mother and wife.

"The End of Summer" was written for the Paper Mill Playhouse production, and is now part of the newly revised score available for licensing.

"With You" and "And What If We Had Loved Like That" are in reverse order in the new libretto.

== Productions ==
The Broadway production, directed by Richard Maltby, Jr. and choreographed by Wayne Cilento, began previews at the Ethel Barrymore Theatre on November 8, 1983, and opened officially on December 4 that same year. It ran for 241 performances and 35 previews before closing on July 1, 1984. The original cast included Liz Callaway as Lizzie Fields, Beth Fowler as Arlene McNally, Todd Graff as Danny Hooper, Catherine Cox as Pam Sakarian, James Congdon as Alan McNally, and Martin Vidnovic as Nick Sakarian. Set design was by John Lee Beatty, costume design by Jennifer von Mayrhauser, and lighting design by Pat Collins.

Paper Mill Playhouse in Millburn, New Jersey, presented an updated version of the musical from March 31, 2004 to May 9, 2004. The cast featured Carolee Carmello (Arlene), Chad Kimball (Danny), LaChanze (Pam), Norm Lewis (Nick), Moeisha McGill (Liz), and Michael Rupert (Alan).

The updated Paper Mill Playhouse script and score were then finalized for a March 2010 production at TrueNorth Cultural Arts in Sheffield Village, Ohio. The cast was headed by Natalie Green (Lizzie), Shane Joseph Siniscalchi (Danny), Michael Dempsey (Alan), Bernadette Hisey (Arlene), David Robeano (Nick) and Maggie Stahl-Floriano (Pam) under the direction of Fred Sternfeld. The production won ten Cleveland Times Tribute Awards for Outstanding Theatre in 2010.

Showbiz Theatre Company in Stockton, California, presented the Music Theatre International production of Baby from March 29 to April 14, 2019. The cast featured Mary Peterson (Arlene), Tayler Thompson (Lizzie), Karene Vocque (Pam), Cole Bryant (Nick), Jason Kell (Alan), and Asante Azevedo (Danny). The production was directed by Jon Robinson with Assistant Director Christine Martin, Choreographer Adam Green, Lighting Designer Nikki Pendley, Sound Designer Craig Vincent, Scenic Designer Tony Parker, and Costume Designer Kathie Dixon.

Out of the Box Theatrics, New York, presented a modern off Broadway version of the musical featuring Pam and Nick Sakarian (originally heterosexual) as a lesbian couple on December 10, 2019. It was directed and choreographed by Ethan Paulini. The cast featured Alice Ripley (Arlene), Gabrielle McClinton (Nicki), Christina Sajous (Pam), Evan Ruggeiro (Danny), Elizabeth Flemming (Lizzie) and Robert H. Fowler (Alan). This production was remounted again in 2021 with a few cast changes, including Julia Murney (Arlene), among others.

=== International ===
The first Australian production of Baby was staged at the Suncorp Theatre in Brisbane, for the Royal Queensland Theatre Company from February through March 1986. The cast included Patrick Phillips as Danny, Rhonda Burchmore as Pam and Geraldine Morrow as Arlene.

Baby was staged at the Meralco Theatre in Manila from August 18 through September 5, 2004. The cast included Lea Salonga in the role of Lizzie Fields and David Shannon as Danny. A Brazilian production opened on May 15, 2011, starring Tadeu Aguiar, Sylvia Massari, Olavo Cavalheiro, Sabrina Korgut, Daíra Sabóia, André Dias and Amanda Acosta.

== Response ==
=== Critical reception ===
Frank Rich, theatre critic for The New York Times, wrote, "At a time when nearly every Broadway musical, good and bad, aims for the big kill with gargantuan pyrotechnics, here is a modestly scaled entertainment that woos us with such basic commodities as warm feelings, an exuberant cast and a lovely score. Perfect Baby is not, but it often makes up in buoyancy and charm what it lacks in forceful forward drive... Sybille Pearson has chosen her characters as if she were a pollster in search of a statistical cross-section of modern (and uniformly model) parents. Worse, this writer... values hit-and-miss one-liners over substance... Miss Pearson is also fond of such plot contrivances as mixed-up lab reports, and, in Act II, the story runs out altogether. The last trimester for the mothers in Baby is as much of a waiting game as it can be in real life. Yet David Shire, the composer, and Richard Maltby Jr., the lyricist, rush to the book's rescue by addressing the show's concerns with both humor and intelligence... To keep up with the varied ages of the characters, Mr. Shire writes with sophistication over a range that embraces rock, jazz and the best of Broadway schmaltz... Mr. Maltby's lyrics are not just smart and funny, but often ingenious." He concluded, "If the virtues of Baby can't override all its hitches, so be it. In achievement, this show is a throwback to the early 1960s - the last era when Broadway regularly produced some casual-spirited musicals that were not instantly categorizable as blockbusters or fiascos. Those musicals - like, say, Do Re Mi or 110 in the Shade - weren't built for the ages but could brighten a theater season or two: They were ingratiatingly professional, had both lulls and peaks, and inspired you to run to the record store as soon as the original cast album came out. So it is with Baby, and wouldn't it be cheering if such a show could find a home on the do-or-die Broadway of today?"

== Awards and nominations ==
=== Original Broadway production ===
Year	Award	Category	Nominee	Result
1984	Tony Award	Best Musical		Nominated
1984	Tony Award	Best Book of a Musical	Sybille Pearson	Nominated
1984	Tony Award	Best Original Score	David Shire and Richard Maltby, Jr.	Nominated
1984	Tony Award	Best Performance by a Featured Actor in a Musical	Todd Graff	Nominated
1984	Tony Award	Best Performance by a Featured Actress in a Musical	Liz Callaway	Nominated
1984	Tony Award	Best Direction of a Musical	Richard Maltby, Jr.	Nominated
1984	Tony Award	Best Choreography	Wayne Cilento	Nominated
1984	Drama Desk Award	Outstanding Musical		Nominated
1984	Drama Desk Award	Outstanding Featured Actor in a Musical	Martin Vidnovic	Won
1984	Drama Desk Award	Outstanding Featured Actress in a Musical	Catherine Cox	Won
1984	Drama Desk Award	Outstanding Orchestrations	Jonathan Tunick	Nominated
1984	Drama Desk Award	Outstanding Lyrics	Richard Maltby, Jr.	Nominated
1984	Drama Desk Award	Outstanding Music	David Shire	Nominated
1984	Theatre World Award		Todd Graff	Won
