= Chronicle of a Death Foretold (musical) =

Musical

- Music: Bob Telson
- Lyrics: Graciela Daniele; Jim Lewis; Michael John LaChiusa (additional lyrics)
- Book: Graciela Daniele; Jim Lewis; Michael John LaChiusa (additional book)
- Basis: Chronicle of a Death Foretold by Gabriel García Márquez
- Productions: 1995 Broadway

Chronicle of a Death Foretold is a musical with a book and lyrics by Graciela Daniele and Jim Lewis (and additional material by Michael John LaChiusa) and music by Bob Telson. It is based on Gabriel García Márquez's 1981 novella of the same name.

== Production ==
The musical premiered on Broadway at the Plymouth Theatre on June 15, 1995, and played 37 performances and 28 previews before closing on July 16, 1995. The show was a presentation of Lincoln Center Theater, as part of their New Collaboration Series. The production was conceived, directed, and choreographed by Graciela Daniele. The original production starred Tonya Pinkins, Saundra Santiago as Angela Vicario and dancers George de la Peña (as Santiago), Alexandre Proia (as Bayardo San Roman), Gregory Mitchell and Luis Perez. It was nominated for three Tony Awards and five Drama Desk Awards, although it failed to win any awards.

== Synopsis ==
In a small town in South America, Bayardo San Roman, a newly married man rejects Angela Vicario, his young bride when he discovers that she is not a virgin. She returns to her family home, where they make her reveal her lover. She names Santiago, the best friend of her brothers, who is innocent. They are determined to avenge the family honor by killing their best friend: a "death foretold."

== Analysis ==
The show is called a "dance theatre" piece, "driven more by dance than by music." John Simon, writing in New York Magazine termed it a "dance-drama", with "dancing, singing, speaking, and posturing." The show has three songs and no actual book, with the "narrative propelled by dance."

== Critical reception ==
Vincent Canby of The New York Times found the musical "a frequently stunning show that is less a conventional musical adaptation than a performance piece". Time magazine wrote that, despite the fact that in "the novella's passage from page to stage, something of its fateful weight has been forfeited", the musical was "smart, surrealistic and visually entrancing."

== Awards and nominations ==
=== Original Broadway production ===
Year	Award	Category	Nominee	Result
1996	Tony Award	Best Musical		Nominated
1996	Tony Award	Best Book of a Musical	Graciela Daniele, Jim Lewis and Michael John LaChiusa	Nominated
1996	Tony Award	Best Choreography	Graciela Daniele	Nominated
1996	Drama Desk Award	Outstanding Musical		Nominated
1996	Drama Desk Award	Outstanding Book of a Musical	Graciela Daniele, Jim Lewis and Michael John LaChiusa	Nominated
1996	Drama Desk Award	Outstanding Director of a Musical	Graciela Daniele	Nominated
1996	Drama Desk Award	Outstanding Choreography	Graciela Daniele	Nominated
1996	Drama Desk Award	Outstanding Music	Bob Telson	Nominated
1996	Drama Desk Award	Outstanding Lighting Design	Beverly Emmons	Nominated
