= Stanley Bahorek =

American actor

Stanley Bahorek is an American actor who has appeared on Broadway.

Bahorek grew up in Worthington, Ohio and graduated from the University of Michigan at Ann Arbor in 2003 with a B.F.A. in Musical Theatre.

He starred as Tom Sawyer in Big River with Deaf West Theater. He appeared in the Transport Group's Drama Desk Winning Production of See Rock City and Other Destinations. Bahorek played the role of Leaf Coneybear on Broadway in The 25th Annual Putnam County Spelling Bee. He was also seen as Mike Taylor, in Queen of the Mist. In 2015, he appeared as Robert Haweis on Broadway in the musical Amazing Grace. In 2017, he appeared as Giuseppe Zangara in Yale Repertory Theatre's production of Assassins
