= First Lady Suite =

- Transport Group promotional image
- Music: Michael John LaChiusa
- Lyrics: Michael John LaChiusa
- Book: Michael John LaChiusa
- Productions: 1993 Off-Broadway

First Lady Suite is a chamber musical by Michael John LaChiusa which premiered Off-Broadway in 1993. It consists primarily of four segments capturing moments in the lives of certain First Ladies of the United States of America. They are: Eleanor Roosevelt, Mamie Eisenhower, Bess Truman, and Jacqueline Bouvier Kennedy. Other First Ladies are also featured in smaller vignettes.

== Productions ==
First Lady Suite was first produced by the New York Shakespeare Festival at the Public Theater. Directed by Kirsten Sanderson, it ran for 32 performances from November 30, 1993 through December 26, 1993. Alice Playten won an Obie Award for her Performance as Mamie Eisenhower and Lady Bird Johnson. Another Obie was awarded to LaChiusa himself for the production, with a Special Citation.

The Blank Theatre in Los Angeles, California presented a revised version of the musical from March 7, 2002 – April 14, 2002. It was directed by Daniel Henning. The cast album from the production is available on PS Classics.

A New York revival produced by Transport Group Theatre Company ran at The Connelly Theater from April 6, 2004 through April 17, 2004. This production, directed by Jack Cummings III, received two Drama Desk Award nominations: Outstanding Revival of a Musical and Outstanding Featured Actress in a Musical for Mary Testa as Lorena Hickok.

The 2004 revival included additional ensemble prologue and epilogue numbers, which more directly explained its characters' desire to "fly away from the constraints that come with the traditional First Lady's privileged life." The revival was filmed for preservation by The Theatre on Film and Tape Archive, a division of The New York Performing Arts Library at Lincoln Center.

The show had its London premiere at the Union Theatre between September 29 and October 17, 2009.

== Casts ==
Original 1993 New York cast

- Alice Playten – Lady Bird Johnson/Mamie Eisenhower
- Debra Stricklin – Margaret Truman
- Carolann Page – Eleanor Roosevelt/Evelyn Lincoln
- Maureen Moore – Amelia Earhart/Jacqueline Bouvier Kennedy
- David Wasson – Dwight Eisenhower
- Priscilla Baskerville – Marian Anderson
- Carol Woods – Lorena Hickok

2002 Los Angeles revision cast

- Gregory Jbara – Dwight Eisenhower/Bess Truman/Presidential Aide
- Kate Shindle – Amelia Earhart
- Evelyn Halus – Eleanor Roosevelt/Evelyn Lincoln
- Heather Lee – Mary Gallagher
- Bronwen Booth – Jacqueline Bouvier Kennedy
- Irene Warner – Lady Bird Johnson/Ike's Chauffeur/Margaret Truman
- Eydie Alyson – Mamie Eisenhower
- Mary-Pat Green – Lorena Hickok
- Paula Newsome – Marian Anderson/The First Lady

2004 New York revival cast

- Mary Testa – Lorena Hickok
- Julia Murney – Amelia Earhart
- Mary Beth Peil – Eleanor Roosevelt
- Donna Lynne Champlin – Mary Gallagher
- Robyn Hussa – Jacqueline Kennedy
- Diane Sutherland – Evelyn Lincoln
- Cheryl Stern – Mamie Eisenhower
- Sherry D. Boone – Marian Anderson
- James Hindman – Dwight Eisenhower
- Ruth Gottschall – Kay Summersby/Margaret Truman/Lady Bird Johnson

== Plot ==
The plot contains four unrelated stories and a prologue.

Prologue
A nameless, African American First Lady reflects on her place in history.

Over Texas
Aboard Air Force One on November 22, 1963, Jacqueline Kennedy's underpaid, overworked Secretary Mary Gallagher complains about her demanding employer to John F Kennedy's secretary Evelyn Lincoln before a foreboding dream reconciles herself to her place in history.

Where's Mamie?
The White House, 1957. Feeling abandoned by her husband's absence on her birthday, Mamie Eisenhower fantasizes a trip through time and space alongside Marian Anderson to prevent her husband from having an affair and to alert him to the racial strife that will soon mar his Presidency.

Olio
1950. Margaret Truman attempts to sing at a Recital, but is constantly upstaged by her mother Bess.

Eleanor Sleeps Here
Inside Amelia Earhart's plane, 1936. As they fly over Washington in a plane piloted by Amelia Earheart, Hickok bitterly reviews her complicated relationship with her lover, friend and employer Eleanor Roosevelt.
