= Julia Murney =

American actress and singer

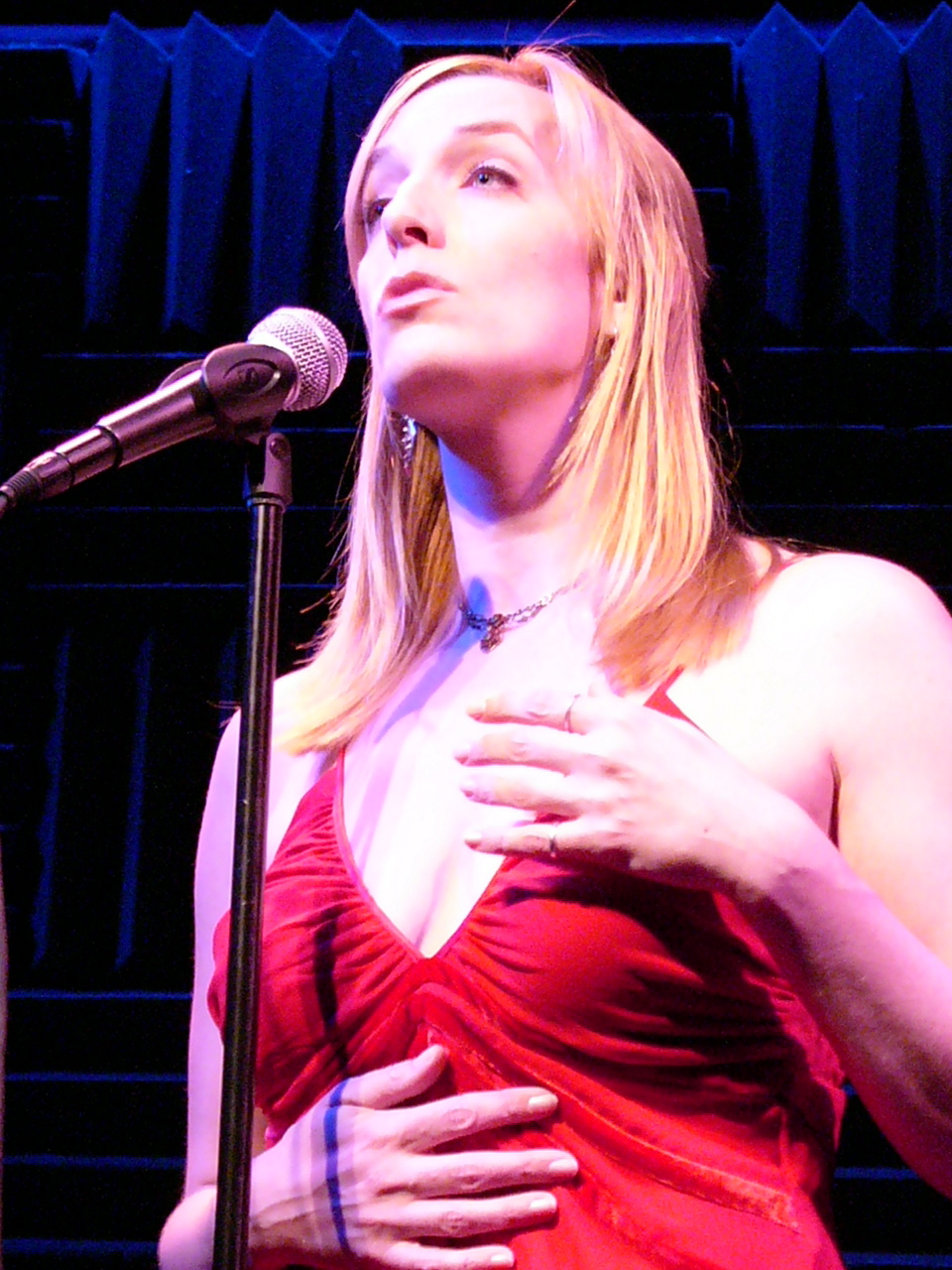
- Murney in 2005
- Occupations: Actress; singer; theatre performer
- Years active: 1995–present

Julia Murney is an American actress and singer, also known for television commercial voice-overs. Until 2005, she was commonly known as the Broadway actress who had technically never appeared on Broadway, because her fame came mostly from her performances on the Broadway charity circuit and not traditional Broadway productions. She played the role of Elphaba in the musical Wicked, both on the US national tour (2006) and on Broadway (2007). She is also a two-time Drama Desk Award nominee, for The Wild Party (2000) and Falling (2013).

== Early life ==
Murney attended Stagedoor Manor summer camp. Murney attended the High School of Music & Art (later Fiorello H. LaGuardia High School) as a voice major and graduated from Syracuse University in 1990.

== Career ==
In the liner notes from Murney's album I'm Not Waiting, composer Andrew Lippa says that he first met her in June 1996. He said,

I was the music director for a Stephen Schwartz compendium called Snapshots, auditions were going well, if uninspiring, until a certain Julia Murney (with whom I was, at the time, unacquainted) strutted into the room. She sang a song, a forever favorite ever since, called Imagine My Surprise. Heartbreaking. Seeing as I was about to do the reading of The Wild Party in August, I wrote on my notes "Is she Queenie?!?!?" followed by several stars and excited doodles. Then, the director asked for another song, preferably something by Stephen Schwartz.

la Murney: I know Meadowlark
la director: That'd be great
I didn't bring the music
la pianist: (panic)
la Lippa: (heroically) I know it, what key? (oh, the swagger, the cock-suredness. I did want to impress her, after all)

Murney's Off-Broadway theatrical credits include originating the role of 'Queenie' in Andrew Lippa's The Wild Party (2000) at the Manhattan Theatre Club, opposite Brian d'Arcy James, Idina Menzel, and Taye Diggs, for which she was nominated for the Drama Desk Award for Outstanding Actress in a Musical. She was also seen in The Vagina Monologues, Crimes of the Heart (2001), A Class Act (2000), Time and Again (2001), and First Lady Suite. She appeared in a musical version of the film Saved! at the Playwrights Horizons Theatre, which began previews on May 9 and opened on June 3, 2008. In August 2008, Murney played the title role in Andrew Lloyd Webber's Evita at the Wells Fargo Pavilion in Sacramento.

Murney made her debut on Broadway in 2005, in the short-lived musical Lennon. She was also seen in the Actors' Fund benefit concerts of Funny Girl, Chess, Hair, and the World AIDS Day Benefit Concert Pippin. She has also been featured on television in Sex and the City, Ed, NYPD Blue, and various episodes of Law & Order.

Afterwards, Murney succeeded Stephanie J. Block in the lead role of Elphaba in the first national touring company of the musical Wicked on March 6, 2006. In that role, she won an Acclaim Award from the Cincinnati Enquirer for leading performer in a musical. She departed the tour on September 3, 2006, after six months, and was replaced by Shoshana Bean. Murney then transferred to the Broadway production, reprising the role of Elphaba for a nine-month engagement, beginning January 9, 2007, replacing Ana Gasteyer. She played her final performance on October 7, 2007 and was replaced by Stephanie J. Block. Both on tour and on Broadway, she starred opposite Kendra Kassebaum as Glinda.

Her debut solo album, I'm Not Waiting, was released in May 2006 on the Sh-K-Boom Records label. The album's title song was written specially for Murney by Andrew Lippa, with whom she has a strong artistic relationship. Also on the album are a jazz acoustic version of the song "I'm Not That Girl" from Wicked and "Perfect", which was written with Tom Kitt. Murney can be heard on the original cast albums of The Wild Party and A Class Act as well as the Actors' Fund recordings of Hair and Chess.

Murney played Mrs. Walker in The Who's Tommy in Oklahoma City from February 5–21, 2009. In September 2009, she appeared in the Signature Theatre's production of First You Dream - The Songs of Kander and Ebb in Arlington, Virginia, with Norm Lewis, Matthew Scott, Heidi Blickenstaff, Eleasha Gamble, and James Clow.

Her other Off-Broadway credits include Queen of the Mist and Closer Than Ever.

In 2013, Murney received a nomination for the Drama Desk Award for Outstanding Actress in a Play for her role as Tami in the play Falling. She played Princess Fiona in The Muny's production of Shrek the Musical from June 24–30, 2013. She returned to The Muny in 2014 to play Mayzie LaBird in Seussical and in 2016 to play Donna Sheridan in Mamma Mia!. Murney played Rose in the 2017 Cape Playhouse production of Gypsy.

In May 2013 Murney sang with the Omaha Symphony in the concert "The Wizard and I - The Musical Journey of Stephen Schwartz" at the Holland Performing Arts Center in Omaha, Nebraska. The concert featured songs from Godspell and Wicked and the song "Meadowlark".

In 2017, Murney played Sara Jane Moore in Yale Repertory Theatre's production of Assassins

In 2021, Murney played the role of Arlene in Out of the Box Theatrical's immersive off-Broadway revival of the musical "Baby". In 2022 Murney appeared in the off-broadway production of Between the Lines in the role of Grace/Queen Maureen. Both productions released cast albums in 2023 which Murney appeared on.

== Selected theater credits ==
Year	Title	Role	Theatre
2000	The Wild Party	Queenie	Manhattan Theatre Club
2002-2003	The Vagina Monologues	Performer	Westside Theatre
2005	Lennon	Performer	Broadhurst Theatre
2006	Wicked	Elphaba	1st US National Tour
2007	Wicked	Elphaba	Gershwin Theatre
2013	Shrek the Musical	Princess Fiona	The Muny
2017	Assassins	Sara Jane Moore	Yale Repertory Theatre
2019	Baby	Arlene	Out of the Box Theatrics at Theatrelab
2021	Baby	Arlene	Out of the Box Theatrics at Theatrelab
2022	Between the Lines	Grace/Queen Maureen	Tony Kiser Theatre
2025	The 25th Annual Putnam County Spelling Bee	Rona Lisa Piretti	The Cape Playhouse

== Filmography ==
=== Film ===
Year	Title	Role	Notes
1997	The Real Shlemiel	Dona (voice)	
2004	Say You Do	Samantha	Short
2008	Ghost Town	Sneezy Lady	
2009	Clear Blue Tuesday	Anonymous Woman	
2010	Multiple Sarcasms	Cari	
2013	La vida inesperada	Lisa	
2014	Gabriel	Woman on Phone	
2015	Emily & Tim	Sarah Lerner	Segment "Betrayal"
2015	First You Dream: The Music of Kander & Ebb		Television film
2015	For Real	Diane	Television film
2019	Big Time Adolescence	Sherri	
2020	First One In	Shelia	
2020	Boy*Friends	Dr. Claymore	Television film
2022	Not Okay	Alice - Support Group Woman	

=== Television ===
Year	Title	Role	Notes
1995	The Wizard of Oz in Concert: Dreams Come True	Background singer	Television benefit performance for the Children's Defense Fund
1999	Law & Order: Special Victims Unit	Waitress	Episode: "A Single Life"
2003	Sex and the City	Rival Raw Woman	Episode: "Great Sexpectations"
2003	NYPD Blue	Nancy Schaffer	Episode: "Frickin' Fracker"
2003	Ed	Amanda Williams	2 episodes
2004, 2007	Law & Order	Marge Hollenbach, Lisa Quinlann	2 episodes
2005	Law & Order: Criminal Intent	Hillary Martz	Episode: "View from Up Here"
2009	30 Rock	Courtney	Episode: "Kidney Now!"
2011	Brothers & Sisters	Kendra	Episode: "Wouldn't It Be Nice"
2015	Elementary	Gayle Wolper	Episode: "When Your Number's Up"
2016	Madam Secretary	Erin	Episode: "Invasive Species"
2018	Succession	Trainer	Episode: "Celebration"
2020	Almost Family	Accuser #2	Episode: "Permanent AF"

=== Video games ===
Year	Title	Role	Notes
2000	The Longest Journey	Emma de Vrijer, Young Alatien Woman, Female Visitor	
2001	Max Payne	Mona Sax, Dispatcher, Lady Amelia	
2006	Dreamfall: The Longest Journey	Emma de Vrijer, Dr. Park, Yuriko	
