= Chronicle of a Death Foretold =

1981 novella by Gabriel García

- First edition (Colombia)
- Author: Gabriel García Márquez
- Publisher: La Oveja Negra
- Publication date: 1981
- Publication place: Colombia
- English publication date: 1983
- Media type: Print
- Pages: 122
- ISBN: 978-0-14-015754-3
- OCLC: 43223288

Chronicle of a Death Foretold (Spanish: Crónica de una muerte anunciada) is a novella by Gabriel García Márquez, published in 1981. Using the form of a pseudo-journalistic reconstruction, it tells the story of the murder of Santiago Nasar by the Vicario twins.

== Plot ==
The book is a nonlinear narrative told by an anonymous narrator and begins on the morning of Santiago Nasar's death. The reader learns that Santiago lives with his mother, Plácida Linero; the cook, Victoria Guzman; and the cook's daughter, Divina Flor. Santiago took over the successful family ranch after the death of his father Ibrahim, who was of Arab origin. He returns home in the early morning hours from an all-night celebration of a wedding between a recent newcomer, Bayardo San Román, and a long-term resident, Ángela Vicario. Two hours after the wedding, Ángela was dragged back to her mother's home by Bayardo because she was not a virgin. After a beating from her mother, Ángela is forced to reveal the name of the man who has defiled her purity and honor. In a somewhat spurious manner, she reveals the man to be Santiago. To avenge their family honor, her twin brothers Pablo and Pedro Vicario decide to kill Santiago using knives that they'd previously used to slaughter pigs.

The brothers proceed to the meat market in the pre-dawn hours to sharpen their knives, declaring to the owner and other butchers that they plan to kill Santiago. Their announcement is mostly disregarded as drunken rambling; Pablo and Pedro are considered to be moral, law-abiding men by their associates, who therefore don't believe that they truly intend to follow through on their threats. However, Faustino Santos, a butcher friend, becomes suspicious and reports the threat to policeman Leandro Pornoy. The brothers proceed to Clotilde Armenta's milk shop where they tell her about the plan to kill Santiago, and she notices the knives wrapped in rags. Meanwhile, Officer Leandro talks with Colonel Aponte who, after leisurely dressing and enjoying his breakfast, proceeds to the milk shop and confiscates the brothers' knives, sending them off to sleep and calling them "a pair of big bluffers". Clotilde is still concerned that the twins will find another way to carry out their plan to murder Santiago and urges Colonel Aponte to intervene further "to spare those poor boys from the horrible duty", but he does nothing more.

Gossip about the twins' publicly announced plans spreads through the town, and though Clotilde asks everyone she sees to warn Santiago, no one does. Some do not believe they should get involved, some assume that he has already been warned, some believe the twins wouldn't really follow through, some are distracted by the arrival of the Bishop, some believe that the murder would be justified, and some secretly want Santiago dead. As the priest later confessed, "I didn't know what to do... it wasn't any business of mine but something for the civil authorities."

The brothers return to the milk shop wielding new knives, and this time Pedro expresses hesitation about their plan because he feels they had fulfilled their duty "when the mayor disarmed them". Nevertheless, they repeat their intention to kill Santiago. Santiago wakes up after an hour's sleep to get dressed and greet the bishop along with many of the townsfolk, who expect him to stop in their town while traveling elsewhere. As Santiago leaves, he does not notice the note that someone had left to warn him about the Vicario brothers' threats on his life. The bishop's boat passes by the town without stopping even though people have been waiting for him with various gifts. Santiago then proceeds to his fiancée Flora Miguel, who yells, "...I hope they kill you!" because she is upset about his involvement with Ángela Vicario and decides not to warn him.

The murder of Santiago Nasar is described. His friend Cristo Bedoya had frantically looked for Santiago on the morning of the murder to warn him of the plan, but Cristo Bedoya failed to find Santiago, who was actually at Flora Miguel's house. When Flora Miguel's father finds out, he warns Santiago minutes before the twins arrive in search of him. Santiago becomes disoriented from the news and starts to run home, with Pablo and Pedro giving chase along the way. His mother, who is finally told while at home, believes he is inside the house and bars the front door, thinking she is protecting him. Santiago arrives to now-locked door and is repeatedly stabbed as he tries in vain to open it. He does not die immediately in the attack and, carrying his exposed entrails in his hands, manages to stagger to the unlocked back door of his home before collapsing dead in the kitchen. An improvised, poorly-executed autopsy performed by the priest determines that Santiago was stabbed over twenty times total with seven fatal wounds.

After the murder, the Vicario family leaves town due to the scandal and disgrace surrounding the events of Ángela's wedding and Santiago's murder. Bayardo San Román leaves town as well; his family comes by boat and picks him up. The Vicario twins spend three years in prison awaiting trial but are acquitted in court, after which Pablo marries his fiancée and Pedro leaves for the armed forces.

Only after Bayardo rejects Ángela does she fall in love with him. After she moves away from the town with her family, Ángela becomes devoted to her embroidery and writes him a letter each week for seventeen years. At the end of seventeen years, Bayardo returns to her, carrying all of her letters in bundles, all unopened.

== Inspiration ==
The novella was inspired by real-life events. In Sucre on 22 January 1951, Miguel Reyes Palencia discovered that his new bride, Margarita Chica Salas, was not a virgin, and returned her to her mother. Margarita's brother, Víctor, killed Cayetano Gentile Chimeno for having taken his sister's virginity.

There are key differences between the action of the story and what took place in reality. For one, in the novella, it is never clear whether or not Santiago Nasar had a prior relationship with Ángela Vicario before her wedding, whereas in real life, the bride had had sexual relations with her former boyfriend. Additionally, García Márquez chose to make the two assassins in the novella twins, Pablo and Pedro Vicario. In real life, they were simply brothers. Lastly, in the book, there is a reconciliation between Ángela and the groom who rejects her, Bayardo San Román. In real life, there was no such reconciliation. A friend of García Márquez, Álvaro Cepeda Samudio, had suggested the ending where Ángela and Bayardo reunite, and the author felt it was the ending that the book needed, as it would transform it from "a tale of an atrocious crime" to "a tale of a terrible love".

Brief references are made to García Márquez's earlier novel One Hundred Years of Solitude, with Bayardo San Román's father being mentioned as having fought against Aureliano Buendía, one of that novel's main characters.

== Key themes ==
The central question at the core of the novella is how the death of Santiago Nasar was widely foreseen — "there had never been a death more foretold," as the narrator describes — yet no one was able or willing to stop it. The narrator explores the circumstances surrounding his death by asking the villagers who were present during his murder and exploring the seeming contradiction of a murder that was predicted. The book explores the morality of the village's collective responsibility in the murder of Santiago Nasar.

Unlike the traditional detective novel, Chronicle of a Death Foretold doesn't investigate the murder, which is made clear from the first sentence. Instead, the true mystery is why the whole town allowed the murder to occur with, at best, only half-hearted attempts to stop it or even warn the victim.

Isabel Alvarez-Borland notes the text’s "conscious fictionality" and how it makes the reader aware of that, with the main character commenting on the case report's meandering literary qualities, reading old reports related to the murder in the same way as the audience reads the novella.

== Adaptations ==
The book was translated into English by Gregory Rabassa. It was adapted for the big screen in the Spanish language film Chronicle of a Death Foretold (1987), an Italian-French-Colombian co-production, directed by Francesco Rosi and starring Ornella Muti, Rupert Everett and Anthony Delon. In 1990, Li Shaohong adapted the book into the Golden Montgolfiere-winning Chinese film Bloody Morning, which centers on Chinese rural society. In 1995, Graciela Daniele adapted it into the Tony Award-nominated Broadway musical of the same name, which she also directed and choreographed.

=== Editions ===
- ISBN 1-4000-3471-X
- ISBN 978-0-14-103246-7

== Reviews ==
- Herdman, John (1983), Márquez Faction or Fiction?, review of Chronicle of a Death Foretold, in Hearn, Sheila G. (ed.), Cencrastus No. 11, New Year 1983, pp. 38–39, ISSN 0264-0856
