= Queen of the Mist =

- Original Off-Broadway Cast Recording
- Music: Michael John LaChiusa
- Lyrics: Michael John LaChiusa
- Book: Michael John LaChiusa
- Basis: The life of Annie Edson Taylor
- Productions: 2011 Off-Broadway; 2019 Off-West End
- Awards: 2012 Outer Critics Circle Award Outstanding New Off-Broadway Musical; 2020 Offie for Best Musical Director

Queen of the Mist is a musical with music, lyrics and book by Michael John LaChiusa. Queen tells the story of Annie Edson Taylor. Produced by Transport Group Theatre Company, the musical first opened Off-Broadway in 2011.

== Production ==
The musical was the inaugural show of Transport Group's 20th Century Project. The musical premiered Off-Broadway at The Gym at Judson on November 6, 2011, and closed on December 4, 2011. The musical received positive reviews. The show received its UK Premiere at the Jack Studio Theatre in London, produced by Pint of Wine Theatre Company, on April 9, 2019, and closed on April 27, 2019.

=== Cast and crew ===
==== Off-Broadway ====
The musical was directed by Jack Cummings III, with musical director Chris Fenwick, choreographer Scott Rink, assistant choreographer Megan Kelley, set design Sandra Goldmark, costume design Kathryn Rohe, lighting design R. Lee Kennedy, sound design Walter Trarbach, assistant set design Aaron Sheckler, assistant light design Robert Eshleman, orchestrations Michael Starobin, and wig design Paul Huntley. The band consisted of David Byrd Marrow (French horn), Chris Fenwick (keyboard 1), Susan French (Violin), Martha Hyde (woodwinds), Jeffrey Levine (bass), Mark Mitchell (keyboard 2), and Anik Oulianine (cello).

The cast was led by Mary Testa (Annie Edson Taylor) and Andrew Samonsky (Mr. Frank Russell) with D.C. Anderson (A New Manager), Stanley Bahorek (Mike Taylor), Theresa McCarthy (Jane), Julia Murney (Carrie Nation), and Tally Sessions (Man with his Hand Wrapped in a Handkerchief).

The musical was made possible by major support by the Shen Family Foundation.

==== Off-West End ====
The musical was directed by Dominic O'Hanlon, with musical director Jordan Li-Smith and associate Connor Fogel, design by Tara Usher, costumer Lemington Ridley, sound design by Adrian Jeakins. The production was produced by Blake Klein for Pint of Wine Theatre Company.

The cast was led by Trudi Camilleri (Annie Edson Taylor) and Will Arundell (Frank Russell) with Emily Juler (Jane), Emma Ralston (Carrie Nation), Tom Blackmore (Mike Taylor), Conor McFarlane (Man with his Hand Wrapped in a Handkerchief) and Andrew Carter (A New Manager). The band was conducted by Jordan Li-Smith, and consisted of Maude Wolstenholme (French horn), Connor Fogel (keyboard 1), Grace Buttler (Violin), Claire Shaw (woodwinds), Jack Cherry (bass), Ashley Jacobs (keyboard 2), and Hannah Thomas (cello).

The production was nominated for two 2020 Offies and received the Offie for ‘Best Musical Director’ - Jordan Li-Smith.

The Original London Cast Recording is available to buy and stream.

== Plot ==
In the early 1900s, in western New York State, at Niagara Falls, Anna Edson Taylor is a 63-year-old teacher. Needing money, she decides to become the first woman to go over Niagara Falls, and designs her own barrel. She is helped by her manager, Frank Russell. "Navigating both the treacherous Falls and a fickle public with a ravenous appetite for sensationalism, this unconventional heroine vies for her legacy in a world clamoring with swindling managers, assassins, revolutionaries, moralizing family, anarchists, and activists. Convinced that there is greatness in her and determined not to live as ordinary, she sets out to battle her fear and tempt her fate." The score incorporates turn-of-the-century themes. Anna attempts to take advantage of her fame on the lecture circuit, but that does not last. Anna dies in a nursing home at age 82, a pauper.

== Musical numbers ==
Act 1

- Opening—Company
- There Is Greatness In Me—Anna Edson Taylor
- A Letter to Jane/The Tiger—Anna, Jane
- Charity—Panhandlers, Anna
- Glorious Devil/The Waters—Barker, Company, Anna
- The Barrel/Cradle or Coffin—Anna
- Types Like You—Mr. Russell, Anna
- Do the Pan! -- Company, Anna, Mr. Russell
- Floating Cloud/Cradle or Coffin Reprise—Rivermen, Anna
- Laugh at the Tiger—Anna
- On the Other Side—Mr. Russell
- Act One Finale—Mr. Russell, Company, Anna

Act 2

- The Quintessential Hero—Anna, Company
- Million Dolla’ Momma—Mr. Russell
- Expectations—Mr. Russell
- Bookings (Part One) -- New Manager, Company, Anna
- Break Down the Door—Carrie Nation, Company
- The Green—Anna
- Bookings (Part Two) -- Anna, New Manager
- Postcards—Company
- The Fall (Act Two Finale) -- Anna, Company

== Reception ==
Ben Brantley of The New York Times said the show "moves forward with a steady, fixed intensity that makes it feel as if it never moves forward at all". Steven Suskin of Variety said LaChuisa "developed a reputation for shows that are more esoteric than involving", but that Queen "breaks the pattern", and also noted that the score was "intelligent" and "tuneful". Aubry D'Arminio writing for Entertainment Weekly referred to the show as "beautifully odd".
