= Barry Edelstein =

American theatre director and author (born 1965)

Barry Edelstein is an American theatre director and author. He was appointed as Artistic Director of the Old Globe Theatre in San Diego, California, on October 17, 2012. He was also Director of the New York Shakespeare Festival / Public Theater's Shakespeare Lab conservatory, 2007–2012, and Director of the Public Theater's Shakespeare Initiative, 2008–2012.

== Early life ==
Edelstein was born in Paterson, New Jersey, on March 11, 1965, and grew up in Fair Lawn, New Jersey. He graduated from Fair Lawn High School in 1982. He graduated from Tufts University summa cum laude in 1986 and won a Rhodes Scholarship. He matriculated at Pembroke College, Oxford, in 1986 and graduated in 1988 with an M.Phil. in English Renaissance Drama.

== Career ==
=== Theater ===
Known for his productions of Shakespeare, he has directed approximately 20 of his plays. For the Public Theater, he staged Julius Caesar starring Jeffrey Wright at the Delacorte Theatre in Central Park and The Merchant of Venice, featuring Ron Leibman's OBIE Award-winning portrayal of Shylock. At the Williamstown Theatre Festival, he directed As You Like It starring Gwyneth Paltrow. From 1998–2003 he was Artistic Director of Classic Stage Company, where he directed Richard III starring John Turturro and Julianna Margulies and The Winter's Tale starring David Strathairn as well as the world premiere of Steve Martin's The Underpants, which he commissioned; Ben Jonson's The Alchemist starring Dan Castellanetta; and Molière's The Misanthrope, starring Uma Thurman in her stage debut and Roger Rees; and Ferdinand Bruckner's Race in his own adaptation. He also produced an additional twelve productions at Classic Stage Company, featuring artists such as Turturro, Tony Shalhoub, Christopher Lloyd, Bill Irwin, Mira Sorvino, Amy Irving, Michael Greif, JoAnne Akalaitis, Philip Glass, Anne Bogart's SITI Company and others. Other New York credits include Arthur Miller's All My Sons (Williamstown, then New York's Roundabout Theatre which won the Lucille Lortel Award for Best Revival); and Steve Martin's Wasp and Other Plays (The Public). He has directed many contemporary and classic plays at leading regional theaters.

=== Film ===
Edelstein's first film, My Lunch with Larry, based on a play by Erin Cressida Wilson and starring Lisa Edelstein (no relation) and Greg Germann, played the festival circuit in 2006 and 2007.

=== Writing ===
Edelstein has written about Shakespeare in particular and the theater in general for The New York Times, The Washington Post, The New Republic, and American Theater. His book Thinking Shakespeare (called by New York Magazine "a must-read for actors") was published by Spark Publishers in 2007, and his book Bardisms: Shakespeare for All Occasions, was published by Harper Perennial in 2008.

=== Teaching ===
Edelstein has taught Shakespearean acting at the Juilliard School, New York University's Graduate Acting Program, and the University of Southern California. He has lectured and taught masterclasses around the USA and the world.

== Personal life ==
Edelstein lives in the San Diego with his wife, their daughter, and son.
