= Graciela Daniele =

Argentine-American dancer, choreographer, and theatre director

Graciela Daniele (born December 8, 1939) is an Argentine-American dancer, choreographer, and theatre director.

A stage musical based on her life, title The Gardens of Anuncia, premiered in 2021, created by Michael John LaChiusa.

== Biography ==
Born in Buenos Aires, Argentina to Raúl Daniele and Rosa del Carmen Almoina. After her parents divorced, her mother got a job as a secretary for the Argentinian government. Later, her mother became an actress.

Daniele began her dance training at the age of seven at Teatro Colón, Argentina's equivalent of Moscow's Bolshoi Theatre. She later moved to Paris to continue her ballet studies, and while living there attended a performance of West Side Story, with Jerome Robbins's original choreography. Overwhelmed by the way dance was an integral part of the story-telling, she decided to move to New York City to study jazz and modern dance, styles she felt were best for expressing human emotions on stage.

As a performer, Daniele made her Broadway debut in What Makes Sammy Run? in 1964. She studied with Martha Graham and Merce Cunningham while working with Bob Fosse, Agnes de Mille, and Michael Bennett, who hired her to assist him with Follies in 1971. Her first credit as a full-fledged choreographer was the 1979 revival of The Most Happy Fella.

Daniele has worked with Woody Allen on three films, Mighty Aphrodite, Everyone Says I Love You, and Bullets over Broadway.

In addition to her work in New York City, where she has choreographed for Ballet Hispanico and served as a director-in-residence at Lincoln Center, Daniele has directed and/or choreographed theatrical, opera, and dance productions throughout the United States.

She has directed and/or choreographed several musicals of Lynn Ahrens and Stephen Flaherty, including, most recently, The Glorious Ones (2007) and Dessa Rose (2005) at the Off-Broadway Mitzi E. Newhouse Theater at Lincoln Center. She has directed and/or choreographed several musicals of Michael John LaChiusa Off-Broadway, most recently Bernarda Alba (2006) and Little Fish (2003).

In 1991, she was the first to direct William Finn's two one-act musicals March of the Falsettos and Falsettoland as one evening of theater, for the Hartford Stage Company. This combination went on to become the musical Falsettos.

In 2005, Daniele was inducted into the American Theater Hall of Fame.

== Additional Broadway credits ==
- 2015: The Visit (Choreographer)
- 2007: The Pirate Queen (Musical Staging)
- 2005: Chita Rivera: The Dancer's Life (Director and Choreographer)
- 2004: Barbara Cook's Broadway! (Creative Consultant)
- 2002: Elaine Stritch At Liberty (Movement Consultant)
- 1999: Marie Christine (Director and Choreographer)
- 1999: Annie Get Your Gun (Director and Choreographer)
- 1998: Ragtime (Choreographer)
- 1995: Chronicle of a Death Foretold (Director, Choreographer, and Writer)
- 1993: The Goodbye Girl (Choreographer)
- 1990: Once on This Island (Director and Choreographer)
- 1985: The Mystery of Edwin Drood (Choreographer)
- 1984: The Rink (Choreographer)
- 1983: Zorba (Choreographer)
- 1981: The Pirates of Penzance (Choreographer)
- 1978: Working (Additional Spanish lyrics)
- 1978: A History of the American Film (Musical Staging)
- 1975: Chicago (Performer)
- 1971: Follies (Performer)
- 1969: Coco (Performer)
- 1968: Promises, Promises (Performer)
- 1968: Here's Where I Belong (Performer)

== Award nominations ==
- 2020 Special Tony Award for Lifetime Achievement in the Theatre
- 2006 Drama Desk Award for Outstanding Choreography (Bernarda Alba)
- 1999 Drama Desk Award for Outstanding Director of a Musical (A New Brain)
- 1998 Tony Award for Best Choreography (Ragtime)
- 1998 Drama Desk Award for Outstanding Choreography (Ragtime)
- 1996 Tony Award for Best Book of a Musical (Chronicle of a Death Foretold)
- 1996 Tony Award for Best Choreography (Chronicle of a Death Foretold)
- 1996 Drama Desk Award for Outstanding Book (Chronicle of a Death Foretold)
- 1996 Drama Desk Award for Outstanding Choreography (Chronicle of a Death Foretold)
- 1996 Drama Desk Award for Outstanding Director of a Musical (Chronicle of a Death Foretold)
- 1994 Drama Desk Award for Outstanding Choreography (Hello Again)
- 1994 Drama Desk Award for Outstanding Director of a Musical (Hello Again)
- 1993 Tony Award for Best Choreography (The Goodbye Girl)
- 1991 Tony Award for Best Choreography (Once on This Island)
- 1991 Tony Award for Best Direction of a Musical (Once on This Island)
- 1990 Tony Award for Best Choreography (Dangerous Games)
- 1986 Tony Award for Best Choreography (The Mystery of Edwin Drood)
- 1984 Tony Award for Best Choreography (The Rink)
- 1981 Tony Award for Best Choreography (The Pirates of Penzance)
- 1981 Drama Desk Award for Outstanding Choreography (The Pirates of Penzance)

== Sources ==
- Eichenbaum, Rose (September 1999). "Faces in Dance: Graciela Daniele". Dance Magazine. 73 (9). Archived from the original on June 15, 2009 – via FindArticles.
- "A Life in the Theatre: Director-Choreographer Graciela Daniele", Mervyn Rothstein, June 15, 2006 playbill interview
