= List of music arrangers =

Notable music arrangers include:

== A ==
- Toshiko Akiyoshi
- Erik Arvinder
- Jeff Atmajian
- Nick Ariondo

== B ==
- HB Barnum
- Norman Bergen
- Doug Besterman
- Larry Blank
- Buddy Bregman
- Alan Broadbent
- Christoph Brüx
- Paul Buckmaster
- Artie Butler

== C ==
- Charles Calello
- Jorge Calandrelli
- David Campbell
- John Clayton Jr.
- Rahn Coleman
- Frank Comstock

== D ==
- Roberto Danova
- Eumir Deodato
- David Foster
- Brent Fischer
- Ernie Freeman

== E ==
- Drew Erickson

== G ==
- Gil Goldstein
- Gordon Goodwin
- Dave Grusin

== H ==
- Simon Hale
- Johnny Harris
- Norman Harris
- Yukari Hashimoto
- Jerry Hey
- Larry Hochman
- Lee Holdridge
- Les Hooper

== I ==
- Nick Ingman
- Merle J. Isaac

== J ==
- Booker T. Jones
- John Paul Jones
- Quincy Jones
- Bradley Joseph
- Tyler Joseph

== K ==
- Artie Kane
- Roger Kellaway
- Sirvan Khosravi
- Ludwik Konopko

== L ==
- Michel Legrand
- Ruslana Lyzhichko

== M ==
- Henry Mancini
- Johnny Mandel
- Anthony Marinelli
- Carl Marsh
- Bobby Martin
- Rob Mathes
- Frank McNamara
- Sergio Mendes
- Vince Mendoza
- Alan Menken
- Bob Mintzer
- Ennio Morricone
- Rob Mounsey
- Manoj George

== N ==
- Richard Niles

== O ==
- Claus Ogerman
- Tale Ognenovski

== P ==
- Gene Page
- Conrad Pope
- Rita Porfiris
- Pino Presti
- André Previn

== R ==
- Ray Reach
- Les Reed
- William Ross
- Paul Riser
- Davide Rossi
- George Russell

== S ==
- Lalo Schifrin
- Maria Schneider
- Vic Schoen
- Don Sebesky
- Deke Sharon
- Randy Slaugh

== T ==
- Octave Octavian Teodorescu
- George Tipton
- Doron Toister
- Steve Tirpak
- Danny Troob
- Jonathan Tunick

== V ==
- Tommy Vig

== W ==
- Chris Walden
- Steve Weisberg
- Harold Wheeler
- Patrick Williams
- Julian Work

== A ==
- Johnny Allen

== B ==
- John Barry
- George Bassman
- Les Baxter
- Louie Bellson
- Robert Russell Bennett
- Harry Betts
- Perry Botkin Jr.
- Bob Brookmeyer
- Ralph Burns
- William David Brohn

== C ==
- John Cameron
- Benny Carter
- Al Cohn
- Michel Colombier
- Ray Conniff
- Don Costa

== D ==
- Tadd Dameron
- George Duke
- Frank De Vol

== E ==
- Jack Elliott
- Ray Ellis
- Gil Evans

== F ==
- Percy Faith
- Robert Farnon
- Bill Finegan
- Clare Fischer
- Ernie Freeman

== G ==
- Douglas Gamley
- Russell Garcia
- Robert Graettinger

== H ==
- Rene Hall
- Norman Harris
- Isaac Hayes
- Neil Hefti
- Ray Heindorf
- Bill Holman

== J ==
- Michael Jackson
- Gordon Jenkins
- J. J. Johnson
- Jimmy Jones
- Thad Jones

== K ==
- Artie Kane
- Michael Kamen
- Peter Knight

== L ==
- Philip J. Lang
- Rod Levitt
- Mort Lindsey
- Geoff Love

== M ==
- Henry Mancini
- Arif Mardin
- Billy May
- Gary McFarland
- Hal Mooney
- Angela Morley
- Jelly Roll Morton
- Gerry Mulligan
- Manoj George

== N ==
- Sammy Nestico
- Tommy Newsom

== O ==
- Chico O'Farrill
- Sy Oliver
- Glen Osser

== P ==
- Gene Page
- Marty Paich
- Ástor Piazzolla
- Perez Prado
- Tito Puente
- Gene Puerling

== R ==
- Johnny Richards
- Nelson Riddle
- Aldemaro Romero
- Pete Rugolo
- George Russell

== S ==
- Conrad Salinger
- Eddie Sauter
- John Serry, Sr.
- Harry Simeone
- Axel Stordahl
- Billy Strayhorn
- Ed Summerlin

== T ==
- Tommy Tycho

== W ==
- Paul Weston
- Barry White
- Ernie Wilkins
- Gerald Wilson

== Z ==
- Torrie Zito
