= Drama Desk Award for Outstanding Orchestrations =

American theatre award

- Awarded for: Outstanding Orchestrations
- Location: New York City
- Country: United States
- Presented by: Drama Desk
- First award: 1983
- Currently held by: David M. Lutken, Morgan Morse, Lisa Helmi Johanson and Sherry Stregack Lutken, The Porch on Windy Hill (2026)
- Website: dramadesk.org (defunct)

The Drama Desk Award for Outstanding Orchestrations is an annual award presented by Drama Desk in recognition of achievements in musical theatre across collective Broadway, off-Broadway and off-off-Broadway productions in New York City. This category was eliminated after the 2011 ceremony, only to be reinstated about a week later due to popular and overwhelming demand from much of the Broadway community.

== Winners and nominees ==
Key

and bold indicates the winner.

=== 1980s ===
Year	Orchestrator(s)	Production	Ref.
1983
1983	**Michael Gibson**	**My One and Only**	
1983	**Hans Spialek**	**On Your Toes**	
1984
1984	**Michael Starobin**	**Sunday in the Park with George**	
1984	Jonathan Tunick	Baby	
1984	Jim Tyler	La Cage aux Folles	
1985
1985	**Steven Margoshes and Danny Troob**	**Big River**	
1985	Bill Byers	Grind	
1985	Michael Starobin	Three Guys Naked from the Waist Down	
1985	Michael Starobin	La bohème	
1986
1986	**Rupert Holmes**	**The Mystery of Edwin Drood**	
1986	Ralph Burns	Sweet Charity	
1986	James McElwaine	Goblin Market	
1987
1987	**John Cameron**	**Les Misérables**	
1987	Wally Harper	Barbara Cook: A Concert for the Theatre	
1987	Michael Starobin	Rags	
1987	Chris Walker	Me and My Girl	
1988
1988	**David Cullen and Andrew Lloyd Webber**	**The Phantom of the Opera**	
1988	Michael Gibson	Anything Goes	
1988	Michael Starobin	Birds of Paradise	
1988	Jonathan Tunick	Into the Woods	
1989	—N/a		

=== 1990s ===
Year	Orchestrator(s)	Production	Ref.
1990
1990	**Billy Byers**	**City of Angels**	
1990	Rodolfo Alchourron and James Kowal	Dangerous Games	
1990	David Cullen and Andrew Lloyd Webber	Aspects of Love	
1990	Peter Matz	Grand Hotel	
1991
1991	**William David Brohn**	**Miss Saigon**	
1991	**William David Brohn**	**The Secret Garden**	
1991	Billy Byers	The Will Rogers Follies	
1991	David Krane	And the World Goes 'Round	
1991	Mboni Ngema	Township Fever	
1992
1992	**Luther Henderson**	**Jelly's Last Jam**	
1992	John Carlini	Song of Singapore	
1992	William David Brohn	Crazy For You	
1993
1993	**Jose Libertella and Luis Stazo**	**Tango Pasion**	
1993	Steven Margoshes	The Who's Tommy	
1993	Michael Starobin	My Favorite Year	
1993	Chris Walker	Putting It Together	
1994
1994	**Jonathan Tunick**	**Passion**	
1994	Douglas Besterman	Damn Yankees	
1994	Peter Matz	The Best Little Whorehouse Goes Public	
1994	Danny Troob	Beauty and the Beast	
1995	—N/a		
1996
1996	**Steve Skinner**	**Rent**	
1996	Bruce Coughlin	Floyd Collins	
1997
1997	**Jonathan Tunick**	**Titanic**	
1997	Michael Gibson	Steel Pier	
1997	Joseph Joubert and Buryl Red	Violet	
1997	Don Sebesky and Harold Wheeler	The Life	
1998
1998	**William David Brohn**	**Ragtime**	
1998	Lisandro Adrover	Luis Bravo's Forever Tango	
1998	Bruce Coughlin	The Sound of Music	
1998	Robert Elhai, David Metzger and Bruce Fowler	The Lion King	
1998	Michael Gibson	Cabaret	
1998	Stanley Silverman	The Capeman	
1999
1999	**Don Sebesky**	**Parade**	
1999	Michael Starobin	A New Brain	
1999	Jonathan Tunick	Captains Courageous	
1999	Jeff Waxman	Woody Guthrie's American Song	

=== 2000s ===
Year	Orchestrator(s)	Production	Ref.
2000
2000	**Don Sebesky**	**Kiss Me, Kate**	
2000	Doug Besterman	The Music Man	
2000	Michael Gibson	The Wild Party	
2000	Taliep Petersen	Kat and the Kings	
2000	Jonathan Tunick	Saturday Night	
2000	Harold Wheeler	Swing!	
2001
2001	**Doug Besterman**	**The Producers**	
2001	Bruce Coughlin	Urinetown	
2001	Michael Starobin	The Adventures of Tom Sawyer	
2001	Jonathan Tunick	Follies	
2001	Harold Wheeler	The Full Monty	
2002
2002	**Doug Besterman and Ralph Burns**	**Thoroughly Modern Millie**	
2002	Jason Robert Brown	The Last Five Years	
2002	Jonathan Tunick	Elaine Stritch: At Liberty	
2003
2003	**Harold Wheeler**	**Hairspray**	
2003	Luther Henderson	Little Ham	
2003	Michel Legrand	Amour	
2004
2004	**William David Brohn**	**Wicked**	
2004	Paul Bogaev	Bombay Dreams	
2004	Michael Starobin	Assassins	
2004	Harold Wheeler	Never Gonna Dance	
2005
2005	**Bruce Coughlin, Adam Guettel and Ted Sperling**	**The Light in the Piazza**	
2005	Steven M. Alper	The Immigrant	
2005	Larry Hochman	Monty Python's Spamalot	
2005	Doug Katsaros and Lynne Shankel	Altar Boyz	
2005	Kim Scharnberg	Little Women	
2005	Harold Wheeler	Dirty Rotten Scoundrels	
2006
2006	**Sarah Travis**	**Sweeney Todd: The Demon Barber of Fleet Street**	
2006	Larry Blank	The Drowsy Chaperone	
2006	Bruce Coughlin	Grey Gardens	
2006	Bruce Coughlin	See What I Wanna See	
2006	Daniel Feyer and Peter Mills	The Pursuit of Persephone	
2006	Danny Troob and Dick Lieb	The Pajama Game	
2007
2007	**Mary-Mitchell Campbell**	**Company**	
2007	**Jonathan Tunick**	**LoveMusik**	
2007	William David Brohn	Curtains	
2007	Alex Lacamoire and Bill Sherman	In the Heights	
2007	Duncan Sheik	Spring Awakening	
2007	Jonathan Tunick	The Apple Tree	
2008
2008	**Jason Carr**	**Sunday in the Park with George**	rowspan=6|
2008	Doug Besterman	Young Frankenstein	
2008	Michael Starobin	The Glorious Ones	
2008	Stew and Heidi Rodewald	Passing Strange	
2008	Jonathan Tunick	A Catered Affair	
2008	Tim Weil	10 Million Miles	
2009
2009	**Martin Koch**	**Billy Elliot the Musical**	
2009	Larry Blank	Irving Berlin's White Christmas	
2009	Bruce Coughlin, Stephen Oremus and Alex Lacamoire	9 to 5	
2009	Aaron Johnson and Antibalas	Fela!	
2009	Edward B. Kessel	A Tale of Two Cities	
2009	Danny Troob and John Clancy	Shrek the Musical	

=== 2010s ===
Year	Orchestrator(s)	Production	Ref.
2010
2010	**Daryl Waters and David Bryan**	**Memphis**	
2010	Larry Hochman	The Scottsboro Boys	
2010	Tom Kitt	American Idiot	
2010	Tom Kitt	Everyday Rapture	
2010	John Oddo	All About Me	
2011
2011	**Larry Hochman and Stephen Oremus**	**The Book of Mormon**	
2011	Mary-Mitchell Campbell	Hello Again	
2011	Bruce Coughlin	The Burnt Part Boys	
2011	Simon Hale, Jim Abbott and David Yazbek	Women on the Verge of a Nervous Breakdown	
2011	Marc Shaiman and Larry Blank	Catch Me If You Can	
2011	Lynne Shankel	The Extraordinary Ordinary	
2012
2012	**Martin Lowe**	**Once**	
2012	Bill Elliott	Nice Work If You Can Get It	
2012	Larry Hochman	Death Takes a Holiday	
2012	John McDaniel	Bonnie & Clyde	
2012	Michael Starobin	Queen of the Mist	
2012	Danny Troob	Newsies	
2013
2013	**Danny Troob**	**Rodgers + Hammerstein's Cinderella**	
2013	Trey Anastasio and Don Hart	Hands on a Hardbody	
2013	Larry Blank	A Christmas Story: The Musical	
2013	Bruce Coughlin	Giant	
2013	Larry Hochman	Chaplin: The Musical	
2013	Steve Margoshes	Soul Doctor	
2014
2014	**Jason Robert Brown**	**The Bridges of Madison County**	
2014	John Clancy	Fun Home	
2014	Larry Hochman	Big Fish	
2014	Steve Sidwell	Beautiful: The Carole King Musical	
2014	Michael Starobin	If/Then	
2014	Jonathan Tunick	A Gentleman's Guide to Love and Murder	
2015
2015	**Christopher Austin**	**An American in Paris**	
2015	Mary-Mitchell Campbell	Allegro	
2015	Larry Hochman	Something Rotten!	
2015	Alex Lacamoire	Hamilton	
2015	Rob Mathes	The Last Ship	
2015	Don Sebesky, Larry Blank, Jason Robert Brown and Charlie Rosen	Honeymoon in Vegas	
2016
2016	**Larry Hochman**	**She Loves Me**	
2016	August Eriksmoen	Bright Star	
2016	Joseph Joubert and Catherine Jayes	The Color Purple	
2016	Andrew Lloyd Webber	School of Rock	
2016	Michael Starobin and Bruce Coughlin	First Daughter Suite	
2017
2017	**Bill Elliott and Greg Anthony Rassen**	**Bandstand**	
2017	Doug Besterman	Anastasia	
2017	Bruce Coughlin	War Paint	
2017	Benjamin Cox	Sweeney Todd: The Demon Barber of Fleet Street	
2017	August Eriksmoen	Come from Away	
2017	Jamshied Sharifi	The Band's Visit	
2018
2018	**Jonathan Tunick**	**Carousel**	
2018	Tom Kitt	SpongeBob SquarePants	
2018	Annmarie Milazzo and Michael Starobin	Once on This Island	
2018	Charlie Rosen and Erin McKeown	Miss You Like Hell	
2018	Jonathan Tunick	Pacific Overtures	
2019
2019	**Daniel Kluger**	**Rodgers & Hammerstein's Oklahoma!**	
2019	Larry Blank	Fiddler on the Roof	
2019	Simon Hale	Girl from the North Country	
2019	Charlie Rosen	Be More Chill	
2019	Daryl Waters	The Cher Show	

=== 2020s ===
Year	Orchestrator(s)	Production	Ref.
2020
2020	**Tom Kitt**	**Jagged Little Pill**	
2020	Alex Lacamoire	The Wrong Man	
2020	Or Matias and Dave Malloy	Octet	
2020	Danny Troob, John Clancy, and Larry Hochman	Soft Power	
2020	Jonathan Tunick	West Side Story	
2021	No awards: New York theatres shuttered, March 2020 to September 2021, due to the COVID-19 pandemic in New York City		
2022
2022	**Jason Michael Webb and David Holcenberg**	**MJ**	
2022	Tom Curran	Six	
2022	Greg Jarrett	Assassins	
2022	Mark Hartman and Yasuhiko Fukuoka	The Streets of New York	
2023
2023	**Bryan Carter and Charlie Rosen**	**Some Like It Hot**	
2023	Bruce Coughlin	A Man of No Importance	
2023	Jason Howland	Shucked	
2023	Kenny Seymour	The Harder They Come	
2023	Daryl Waters and Sam Davis	New York, New York	
2024	**Marco Paguia**	**Buena Vista Social Club**	
2024	Timo Andres	Illinoise	
2024	Will Butler and Justin Craig	Stereophonic	
2024	Andy Evan Cohen	The Greatest Hits Down Route 66	
2024	Erik Della Penna, Dean Sharenow, and David Yazbek	Dead Outlaw	
2024	Michael Starobin, Shaina Taub (vocal arrangements), and Andrea Grody (vocal arrangements)	Suffs	
2025
2025	**Andrew Resnick and Michael Thurber**	Just in Time	
2025	Will Aronson	Maybe Happy Ending	
2025	Doug Besterman	Boop! The Musical	
2025	Joseph Joubert and Daryl Waters	Pirates! The Penzance Musical	
2025	Michael Starobin	All the World's a Stage	
2026
2026	**David M. Lutken, Morgan Morse, Lisa Helmi Johanson and Sherry Stregack Lutken**	**The Porch on Windy Hill**	
2026	Daniel Kluger	The Seat of Our Pants	
2026	Bryan Carter	The Fear of 13	
2026	John McDaniel	Lights Out: Nat “King” Cole	
2026	The Bengsons and Or Matias	My Joy is Heavy	

== Statistics ==
=== Multiple wins ===
4 wins

- Jonathan Tunick

3 wins

- William David Brohn

2 wins

- Doug Besterman
- Larry Hochman
- Don Sebesky
- Danny Troob

=== Multiple nominations ===
15 nominations

- Jonathan Tunick
- Michael Starobin

9 nominations

- Larry Hochman

7 nominations

- Doug Besterman
- Danny Troob

6 nominations

- Harold Wheeler

5 nominations

- William David Brohn
- Michael Gibson

4 nominations

- Don Sebesky
- Alex Lacamoire

3 nominations

- Steven Margoshes
- Bill Byers
- Jason Robert Brown
- Tom Kitt
- Joseph Joubert

2 nominations

- David Yazbek
- Ralph Burns
- Peter Matz
- Luther Henderson

== See also ==
- Tony Award for Best Orchestrations
- Outer Critics Circle Award for Outstanding Orchestrations
