= Jonathan Tunick =

American orchestrator, musical director, and composer,

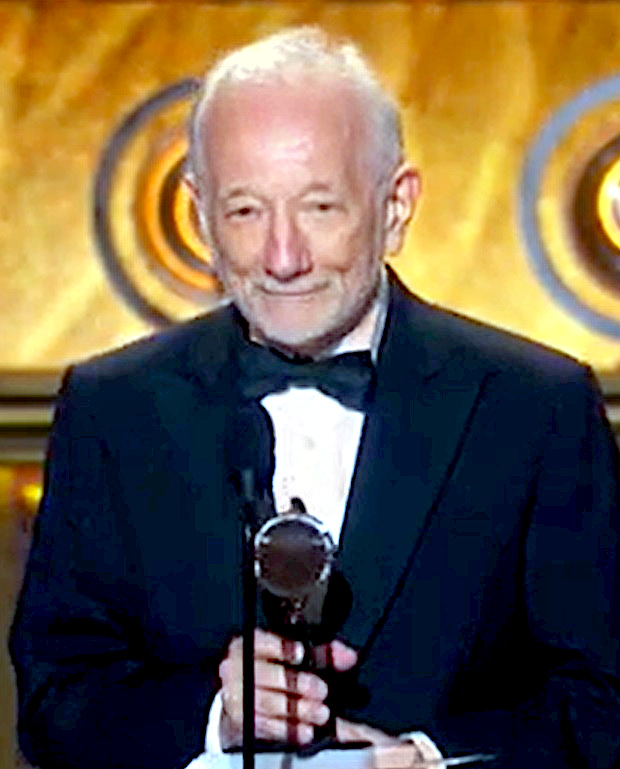
- Tunick receiving Tony Award for Best Orchestrations 2024
- Born: April 19, 1938 (age 88); New York City, New York, United States
- Education: Bard College, Juilliard School
- Occupations: Orchestrator; musical director; composer
- Spouse: Leigh Beery
- Awards: EGOT

Jonathan Tunick (born April 19, 1938) is an American orchestrator, musical director, and composer. He is best known for orchestrating the works of Stephen Sondheim, their collaboration starting in 1970 with Company and continuing until Sondheim's death in 2021.

== Early life and education ==
Jonathan Tunick graduated from Hunter College Elementary School and LaGuardia Performing Arts High School. He holds degrees from Bard College and the Juilliard School.

== Career ==
Tunick's principal instrument is the clarinet. Much of his work has arisen from his involvement in theatre, and he is associated especially with the musicals of Stephen Sondheim. Sondheim said "Tunick is a standout in his field not only because of his musicianship and imagination, but primarily because of his great sensitivity to theatrical atmosphere".

Tunick's band, "Broadway Moonlighters", played in 2008 with Barbara Cook as special guest, and played at Birdland jazz club in March 2012. He has also worked as an arranger and/or conductor on recordings with Judy Collins, Kiri Te Kanawa, Brian Asawa, Sir Neville Mariner, Itzhak Perlman, Plácido Domingo, Johnny Mathis, Barbra Streisand, Paul McCartney, and Bernadette Peters.

== Recognition and awards ==
In his review of the Bernadette Peters recording Bernadette Peters Loves Rodgers and Hammerstein (2002), John Kenrick wrote: "Jonathan Tunick provides the brilliant arrangements."

He has won all four major American show business awards: the Emmy, Grammy, Oscar, and Tony, making him an EGOT. In 1978, Tunick won an Oscar for A Little Night Music (Best Original Song Score and Its Adaptation or Adaptation Score). In 1982, he won an Emmy for his work on the variety television special Night of 100 Stars (Outstanding Achievement in Music Direction), and in 1988, he won a Grammy for his work on the song "No One Is Alone" (Best Instrumental Arrangement Accompanying Vocal(s)), and in 1997, he won the first Tony Award for Best Orchestrations for the musical Titanic.

He has also won the Drama Desk Award for Outstanding Orchestrations four times and won a Drama Desk Special Award in 1982. Tunick was inducted into the American Theatre Hall of Fame in January 2009.

== Personal life ==
Tunick is married to actress Leigh Beery (also known as "Lee Beery"), who appeared in the television soap opera Dark Shadows in 1971.

== Work ==
=== Stage ===
Sources - AllMusic; Internet Broadway Database

- Take Five (composer: "Gristedes," "The Pro Musica Antiqua")(Julius Monk Revue) - 1957
- From A to Z - 1960
- All in Love - 1961
- Promises, Promises - 1968
- Here's Where I Belong - 1968
- Dames at Sea - 1969
- Company - 1970
- The Grass Harp - 1971
- Follies - 1971
- MASS - 1971
- The Selling of the President - 1972
- Sondheim: A Musical Tribute - Concert - 1973
- A Little Night Music - 1973
- Smith - 1973
- A Chorus Line - 1975 ("Opening," "Nothing," "At The Ballet," "...And," "What I Did For Love")
- Goodtime Charley - 1975
- The Frogs - 1975
- Pacific Overtures - 1976
- Ballroom - 1978
- Sweeney Todd - 1979
- Merrily We Roll Along - 1981
- Nine - (musical supervisor and orchestrations) 1982
- Alice in Wonderland - (musical supervisor) 1982
- Baby - 1983
- Dance a Little Closer - 1983
- Wind in the Willows - (musical supervisor) 1985
- Into the Woods - 1987
- Nick & Nora - 1991
- Phantom - 1992
- A Grand Night for Singing - 1993
- Company (re-orchestrated) - 1993
- Sweeney Todd (re-orchestrated) - 1993
- Passion - 1994
- The Petrified Prince - Public Theater 1994
- Patti LuPone on Broadway - Walter Kerr Theatre Concert 1995
- Company - 1995
- A Funny Thing Happened on the Way to the Forum (re-orchestrated; originals by Sid Ramin and Irwin Kostal) - 1996
- Martin Guerre - 1996
- Into the Woods - 1997
- Titanic - 1997
- Saturday Night - 1999
- Minnelli on Minnelli - (orchestrations) Palace Theatre Concerts 1999
- Marie Christine - 1999
- Putting It Together - 1999
- Napoleon - 2000
- Follies (re-orchestrated) - 2001
- Into the Woods (re-orchestrated) - 2002
- Elaine Stritch At Liberty - 2001
- Nine - (re-orchestrated) 2003
- 110 in the Shade (re-orchestrated from Hershy Kay's originals) - 2003
- The Frogs (re-orchestrated & expanded) - 2004
- Pacific Overtures - (re-orchestrated) 2004
- The Color Purple - 2005
- A Chorus Line - (re-orchestrated) 2006
- The Apple Tree - (re-orchestrated from Eddie Sauter's originals) 2006
- 110 in the Shade - (re-orchestrated from Hershy Kay's originals) 2007
- Lovemusik - 2007
- A Catered Affair - 2008
- Road Show - 2008 and 2003
- The Story of My Life - 2009
- Oklahoma! - (re-orchestrated from Robert Russell Bennett's originals) 2009
- Bye Bye Birdie - (re-orchestrated from Robert Ginzler's originals) 2009
- Paradise Found - 2010
- Some Lovers - Old Globe Theatre 2011
- Sweeney Todd (re-orchestrated) - 2012
- Passion (re-orchestrated) - 2013
- A Gentleman's Guide to Love and Murder - 2013
- Waterfall - Pasadena Playhouse 2015
- Dames at Sea (re-orchestrated) - 2015
- Cabin in the Sky - Encores! 2016
- Carousel - (re-orchestrated from Don Walker's originals) 2018
- Here We Are - 2023

=== Filmography ===
Sources - AllMusic; Internet Movie Database

- The Twelve Chairs - 1970 - musical director, orchestrator
- Blazing Saddles - 1974 - orchestrator
- Young Frankenstein - 1974 - orchestrator
- The Adventure of Sherlock Holmes' Smarter Brother - 1975 - orchestrator
- A Little Night Music - 1977 - composer orchestrator, conductor (winner, Academy Award)
- Columbo: Murder Under Glass - 1978 - (television) - composer, conductor
- Flying High - 1978 - (television) - composer, conductor
- 3 by Cheever: "O Youth and Beauty", "The Sorrows of Gin" and 3 by Cheever: The 5:48 - 1979 - (television) - composer, conductor
- Rendezvous Hotel - 1979 - (television) - composer, conductor
- Swan Song - 1980 - (television) - composer, conductor
- Blinded by the Light - 1980 - (television) - composer, conductor
- The Jilting of Granny Weatherall - 1980 - (television) - composer, conductor
- Fort Apache the Bronx - 1981 - composer, conductor
- Endless Love - 1981 - composer, conductor
- Reds - 1981 - orchestrator
- The Shady Hill Kidnapping - 1982 - (television) - composer, conductor
- Night of 100 Stars - 1982 - (television) - music arranger
- Sweeney Todd - 1982 - (television) - orchestrator
- Alice in Wonderland - 1983 - (television) - composer, conductor
- I Am the Cheese - 1983 - composer, conductor
- Murder, She Wrote - 1984 - (television) - series composer, conductor
- Concealed Enemies - 1984 - (television) - composer, conductor
- Brotherly Love - 1985 - (television) - composer, conductor
- Steven Spielberg's Amazing Stories - 1985 - (television) - series composer, conductor
- The B.R.A.T. Patrol - 1986 - (television) - composer, conductor
- American Masters - 1986 - (television) - composer (theme only)
- You Ruined My Life - 1987 - (television) - composer, conductor
- Into the Woods - 1991 - (television) - orchestrator
- Sondheim: A Celebration at Carnegie Hall - 1993 (televised) (concert in 1992) - (television) - orchestrator
- The Last Good Time - 1994 - composer, conductor
- The Birdcage - 1996 - music arranger and adapter, composer, conductor
- Hey, Mr. Producer! The Musical World of Cameron Mackintosh - 1998 - (television) - orchestrator
- The Fantasticks - 2000 - music adaptor and arranger, conductor
- Find Me Guilty - 2006 - composer, conductor
- Sweeney Todd (Tim Burton film) - 2007 - music adaptor and orchestrator
- Into the Woods - 2014 - orchestrator
- Beauty and the Beast - 2017 - orchestrator

== Awards and nominations ==
=== Academy Awards ===
Year	Category	Nominated work	Result	Ref.
1977	Best Original Song Score and Its Adaptation or Adaptation Score	A Little Night Music	Won	

=== Drama Desk Awards ===
Year	Category	Nominated work	Result	Ref.
1982	Drama Desk Special Award		Honoree	
1984	Outstanding Orchestrations	Baby	Nominated	
1988	Outstanding Orchestrations	Into the Woods	Nominated	
1994	Outstanding Orchestrations	Passion	Won	
1997	Outstanding Orchestrations	Titanic	Won	
1999	Outstanding Orchestrations	Captains Courageous	Nominated	
2000	Outstanding Orchestrations	Saturday Night	Nominated	
2001	Outstanding Orchestrations	Follies	Nominated	
2002	Outstanding Orchestrations	Elaine Stritch: At Liberty	Nominated	
2007	Outstanding Orchestrations	The Apple Tree	Nominated	
2007	Outstanding Orchestrations	LoveMusik	Won	
2008	Outstanding Orchestrations	A Catered Affair	Nominated	
2014	Outstanding Orchestrations	A Gentleman's Guide to Love and Murder	Nominated	
2018	Outstanding Orchestrations	Carousel	Won	
2018	Outstanding Orchestrations	Pacific Overtures	Nominated	
2020	Outstanding Orchestrations	West Side Story	Nominated	

=== Grammy Awards ===
Year	Category	Nominated work	Result	Ref.
1981	Best Album of Original Score Written for a Motion Picture or a Television Special	Endless Love: Original Motion Picture Soundtrack	Nominated	
1988	Best Instrumental Arrangement Accompanying Vocal(s)	"No One is Alone"	Won	

=== Primetime Emmy Awards ===
Year	Category	Nominated work	Result	Ref.
1982	Outstanding Achievement in Music Direction	Night of 100 Stars	Won	
1984	Outstanding Achievement in Music Direction	Live from Lincoln Center (Episode: "Marilyn Horne's Great American Songbook")	Nominated	
1984	Outstanding Achievement in Music Composition for a Limited Series or a Special (Dramatic Underscore)	American Playhouse (Episode: "Concealed Enemies")	Nominated	
1989	Outstanding Achievement in Main Title Theme Music	Tattingers	Nominated	
1993	Outstanding Individual Achievement in Main Title Theme Music	Love & War	Nominated	

=== Tony Awards ===
Year	Category	Nominated work	Result	Ref.
1997	Best Orchestrations	Titanic	Won	
2000	Best Orchestrations	Marie Christine	Nominated	
2001	Best Orchestrations	Follies	Nominated	
2003	Best Orchestrations	Nine	Nominated	
2005	Best Orchestrations	Pacific Overtures	Nominated	
2007	Best Orchestrations	110 in the Shade	Nominated	
2007	Best Orchestrations	LoveMusik	Nominated	
2008	Best Orchestrations	A Catered Affair	Nominated	
2010	Best Orchestrations	Promises, Promises	Nominated	
2014	Best Orchestrations	A Gentleman's Guide to Love and Murder	Nominated	
2018	Best Orchestrations	Carousel	Nominated	
2024	Best Orchestrations	Merrily We Roll Along	Won	

== See also ==
- List of music arrangers
