= Michael Gibson (musician) =

American orchestrator (1944–2005)

- Born: September 29, 1944; Wilmington, Delaware
- Died: July 15, 2005 (aged 60); Dover, New Jersey
- Occupation: Musician

Michael Gibson (September 29, 1944 – July 15, 2005) was a musician, trombonist and orchestrator, nominated twice for the American Theatre Wing's Tony Award for Best Orchestrations. He won the Drama Desk Award for Outstanding Orchestrations for My One and Only in 1983.

== Biography ==
=== Early life ===
Gibson was born and raised in Wilmington, Delaware and attended Harvard University for two years before transferring to the Berklee College of Music in Boston, Massachusetts to study music composition and theory. He was also a licensed pilot, and he and Larry Blank flew together.

=== Career ===
Gibson began his career as a studio musician in New York City, often working with James Brown. In 1972 he changed direction, to become an orchestrator. Best known for his work on the original motion picture version of Grease (1978) and the Broadway musicals Steel Pier (1997) and Cabaret (revival, 1998), Gibson frequently worked with the famous composer-lyricist partnership of John Kander and Fred Ebb; his long-standing relationship with Kander began with Woman of the Year (1981). He received four additional Drama Desk Award for Outstanding Orchestrations nominations: for Anything Goes (1988), Steel Pier (1997), Cabaret (1998), and the 'dexterously orchestrated' The Wild Party (2000).

Gibson also worked on motion pictures, including Merchant Ivory's Roseland (1976), for which he composed, arranged and orchestrated, and Robert Benton's thriller Still of the Night (1982), orchestrating Kander's score. He orchestrated solo shows for dancers and performers, including Liza Minnelli, and, with Jonathan Tunick, the 1993 musical revue, A Grand Night for Singing. Film Reference has a more complete list.

Gibson was known for a big, jazzy musical sound with plenty of brass, which dancers love. His last venture was All Shook Up (2005), which he co-orchestrated with Stephen Oremus.

=== Death ===
Gibson died in Dover, New Jersey on July 15, 2005, after a lengthy battle with cancer. He was survived by his wife of 21 years, Ellen, and son Andrew. After his death, Ellen Gibson donated his archive to the New York Public Library for the Performing Arts in 2006.
