= Tony Award for Best Orchestrations =

American theatre award for Broadway orchestras

- Awarded for: Best Orchestrations
- Location: United States New York City
- Presented by: American Theatre Wing The Broadway League
- Currently held by: Doug Besterman and Mike Morris for Schmigadoon! (2026)
- Website: TonyAwards.com

The Tony Award for Best Orchestrations is awarded to acknowledge the contributions of musical orchestrators in both musicals and plays. The award has been given since 1997.

== Winners and nominees ==
indicates the winner

=== 1990s ===
Year	Musical	Nominees
1997 (51st)
1997 (51st)	Titanic	Jonathan Tunick
1997 (51st)	The Life	Don Sebesky and Harold Wheeler
1997 (51st)	Play On!	Luther Henderson
1997 (51st)	Steel Pier	Michael Gibson
1998 (52nd)
1998 (52nd)	Ragtime	Bill Brohn
1998 (52nd)	Cabaret	Michael Gibson
1998 (52nd)	The Capeman	Stanley Silverman
1998 (52nd)	The Lion King	Robert Elhai, Bruce Fowler and David Metzger
1999 (53rd)
1999 (53rd)	Fosse	Doug Besterman and Ralph Burns
1999 (53rd)	Little Me	Harold Wheeler
1999 (53rd)	Parade	Don Sebesky
1999 (53rd)	Swan Lake	David Cullen

=== 2000s ===
Year	Musical	Nominees
2000 (54th)
2000 (54th)	Kiss Me, Kate	Don Sebesky
2000 (54th)	Marie Christine	Jonathan Tunick
2000 (54th)	The Music Man	Doug Besterman
2000 (54th)	Swing!	Harold Wheeler
2001 (55th)
2001 (55th)	The Producers	Doug Besterman
2001 (55th)	A Class Act	Larry Hochman
2001 (55th)	Follies	Jonathan Tunick
2001 (55th)	The Full Monty	Harold Wheeler
2002 (56th)
2002 (56th)	Thoroughly Modern Millie	Doug Besterman and Ralph Burns
2002 (56th)	Mamma Mia!	Benny Andersson, Martin Koch and Björn Ulvaeus
2002 (56th)	Sweet Smell of Success	Bill Brohn
2002 (56th)	Urinetown	Bruce Coughlin
2003 (57th)
2003 (57th)	Movin' Out	Billy Joel and Stuart Malina
2003 (57th)	La bohème	Nicholas Kitsopoulos
2003 (57th)	Hairspray	Harold Wheeler
2003 (57th)	Nine	Jonathan Tunick
2004 (58th)
2004 (58th)	Assassins	Michael Starobin
2004 (58th)	Bombay Dreams	Paul Bogaev
2004 (58th)	Fiddler on the Roof	Larry Hochman
2004 (58th)	Wicked	Bill Brohn
2005 (59th)
2005 (59th)	The Light in the Piazza	Bruce Coughlin, Adam Guettel and Ted Sperling
2005 (59th)	Dirty Rotten Scoundrels	Harold Wheeler
2005 (59th)	Monty Python's Spamalot	Larry Hochman
2005 (59th)	Pacific Overtures	Jonathan Tunick
2006 (60th)
2006 (60th)	Sweeney Todd: The Demon Barber of Fleet Street	Sarah Travis
2006 (60th)	The Drowsy Chaperone	Larry Blank
2006 (60th)	Jersey Boys	Steve Orich
2006 (60th)	The Pajama Game	Dick Lieb and Danny Troob
2007 (61st)
2007 (61st)	Spring Awakening	Duncan Sheik
2007 (61st)	110 in the Shade	Jonathan Tunick
2007 (61st)	Grey Gardens	Bruce Coughlin
2007 (61st)	LoveMusik	Jonathan Tunick
2008 (62nd)
2008 (62nd)	In the Heights	Alex Lacamoire and Bill Sherman
2008 (62nd)	A Catered Affair	Jonathan Tunick
2008 (62nd)	Passing Strange	Heidi Rodewald and Stew
2008 (62nd)	Sunday in the Park with George	Jason Carr
2009 (63rd)
2009 (63rd)	Billy Elliot the Musical (TIE)	Martin Koch
2009 (63rd)	Next to Normal (TIE)	Michael Starobin and Tom Kitt
2009 (63rd)	Shrek the Musical	Danny Troob and John Clancy
2009 (63rd)	White Christmas	Larry Blank

=== 2010s ===
Year	Musical	Nominees
2010 (64th)
2010 (64th)	Memphis	David Bryan and Daryl Waters
2010 (64th)	Fela!	Aaron Johnson
2010 (64th)	La Cage aux Folles	Jason Carr
2010 (64th)	Promises, Promises	Jonathan Tunick
2011 (65th)
2011 (65th)	The Book of Mormon	Larry Hochman and Stephen Oremus
2011 (65th)	Catch Me If You Can	Larry Blank and Marc Shaiman
2011 (65th)	How to Succeed in Business Without Really Trying	Doug Besterman
2011 (65th)	The Scottsboro Boys	Larry Hochman
2012 (66th)
2012 (66th)	Once	Martin Lowe
2012 (66th)	Newsies	Danny Troob
2012 (66th)	Nice Work If You Can Get It	Bill Elliott
2012 (66th)	Porgy and Bess	Bill Brohn and Christopher Jahnke
2013 (67th)
2013 (67th)	Kinky Boots	Stephen Oremus
2013 (67th)	Matilda the Musical	Chris Nightingale
2013 (67th)	Motown: The Musical	Bryan Crook and Ethan Popp
2013 (67th)	Rodgers + Hammerstein's Cinderella	Danny Troob
2014 (68th)
2014 (68th)	The Bridges of Madison County	Jason Robert Brown
2014 (68th)	Beautiful: The Carole King Musical	Steve Sidwell
2014 (68th)	Bullets Over Broadway	Doug Besterman
2014 (68th)	A Gentleman's Guide to Love and Murder	Jonathan Tunick
2015 (69th)
2015 (69th)	An American in Paris	Christopher Austin, Bill Elliott and Don Sebesky
2015 (69th)	Fun Home	John Clancy
2015 (69th)	The Last Ship	Rob Mathes
2015 (69th)	Something Rotten!	Larry Hochman
2016 (70th)
2016 (70th)	Hamilton	Alex Lacamoire
2016 (70th)	Bright Star	August Eriksmoen
2016 (70th)	She Loves Me	Larry Hochman
2016 (70th)	Shuffle Along, or, the Making of the Musical Sensation of 1921 and All That Followed	Daryl Waters
2017 (71st)
2017 (71st)	Dear Evan Hansen	Alex Lacamoire
2017 (71st)	Bandstand	Bill Elliott and Greg Anthony Rassen
2017 (71st)	Hello, Dolly!	Larry Hochman
2017 (71st)	Natasha, Pierre & The Great Comet of 1812	Dave Malloy
2018 (72nd)
2018 (72nd)	The Band's Visit	Jamshied Sharifi
2018 (72nd)	Carousel	Jonathan Tunick
2018 (72nd)	Mean Girls	John Clancy
2018 (72nd)	Once on This Island	Annmarie Milazzo and Michael Starobin
2018 (72nd)	SpongeBob SquarePants	Tom Kitt
2019 (73rd)
2019 (73rd)	Hadestown	Michael Chorney and Todd Sickafoose
2019 (73rd)	Ain’t Too Proud	Harold Wheeler
2019 (73rd)	Kiss Me, Kate	Larry Hochman
2019 (73rd)	Oklahoma!	Daniel Kluger
2019 (73rd)	Tootsie	Simon Hale

=== 2020s ===
Year	Musical	Nominees
2020 (74th)
2020 (74th)	Moulin Rouge! The Musical	Katie Kresek, Justin Levine, Charlie Rosen and Matt Stine
2020 (74th)	Jagged Little Pill	Tom Kitt
2020 (74th)	Tina: The Tina Turner Musical	Ethan Popp
2022 (75th)
2022 (75th)	Girl from the North Country	Simon Hale
2022 (75th)	Company	David Cullen
2022 (75th)	MJ	David Holcenberg and Jason Michael Webb
2022 (75th)	SIX: The Musical	Tom Curran
2022 (75th)	A Strange Loop	Charlie Rosen
2023 (76th)
2023 (76th)	Some Like It Hot	Charlie Rosen and Bryan Carter
2023 (76th)	& Juliet	Bill Sherman and Dominic Fallacaro
2023 (76th)	Kimberly Akimbo	John Clancy
2023 (76th)	New York, New York	Daryl Waters and Sam Davis
2023 (76th)	Shucked	Jason Howland
2024 (77th)
2024 (77th)	Merrily We Roll Along	Jonathan Tunick
2024 (77th)	Hell's Kitchen	Adam Blackstone and Tom Kitt
2024 (77th)	Illinoise	Timo Andres
2024 (77th)	The Outsiders	Matt Hinkley, Justin Levine, and Jamestown Revival (Zach Chance and Jonathan Clay)
2024 (77th)	Stereophonic	Will Butler and Justin Craig
2025 (78th)
2025 (78th)	Buena Vista Social Club	Marco Paguia
2025 (78th)	Floyd Collins	Bruce Coughlin
2025 (78th)	Just in Time	Andrew Resnick and Michael Thurber
2025 (78th)	Maybe Happy Ending	Will Aronson
2025 (78th)	Sunset Blvd.	David Cullen and Andrew Lloyd Webber
2026 (79th)
2026 (79th)	Schmigadoon!	Doug Besterman and Mike Morris
2026 (79th)	Cats: The Jellicle Ball	Andrew Lloyd Webber, David Wilson, Trevor Holder and Doug Schadt
2026 (79th)	Chess	Brian Usifer
2026 (79th)	The Lost Boys	Ethan Popp, Kyler England, Adrianne "AG" Gonzalez and Gabriel Mann
2026 (79th)	Two Strangers (Carry a Cake Across New York)	Lux Pyramid

== Multiple wins ==
4 wins

- Doug Besterman

3 wins

- Alex Lacamoire

2 wins

- Ralph Burns
- Stephen Oremus
- Charlie Rosen
- Don Sebesky
- Michael Starobin
- Jonathan Tunick

== Multiple nominations ==
12 Nominations

- Jonathan Tunick

9 Nominations

- Larry Hochman

7 Nominations

- Doug Besterman
- Harold Wheeler

4 Nominations

- Bill Brohn
- John Clancy
- Bruce Coughlin
- Tom Kitt
- Don Sebesky
- Danny Troob

3 Nominations

- Larry Blank
- David Cullen
- Bill Elliott
- Alex Lacamoire
- Ethan Popp
- Charlie Rosen
- Michael Starobin
- Daryl Waters

2 Nominations

- Ralph Burns
- Jason Carr
- Simon Hale
- Michael Gibson
- Martin Koch
- Stephen Oremus
- Bill Sherman
- Andrew Lloyd Webber

== See also ==
- Tony Award for Best Original Score
- Drama Desk Award for Outstanding Orchestrations
- Laurence Olivier Award for Best Original Score or New Orchestrations
- List of Tony Award-nominated productions
