= Sarah Travis =

British conductor

Sarah Travis is a British orchestrator and musical supervisor for theatre and film. She received the Tony Award for Best Orchestrations and the Drama Desk Award for Outstanding Orchestrations for the 2005 revival of Stephen Sondheim's Sweeney Todd.

== Career ==
Travis attended City University and Guildhall School of Music and Drama.

She has been the musical supervisor and/or orchestrator for many musicals, both in the West End and at regional British theatres. Some of the latter include Crazy for You and Me and My Girl (Aberystwyth); Annie (Belfast Lyric); Pal Joey (York). Additionally, she has composed music for several shows, such as Dick Whittington at the Barbican Centre, and seven other pantomimes for Chipping Norton. She was the musical director and arranger for Privates on Parade at the West Yorkshire Playhouse and Birmingham Repertory Theatre Company (15 September 2008 to 11 October 2008).

She was also the music supervisor for the Agatha Christie Marple series television movie Sleeping Murder (2006).

=== Watermill Theatre ===
Travis has had a long relationship with the Watermill Theatre, Newbury. Several of her productions there have gone on to West End runs. Her Watermill productions have included Piaf, a play by Pam Gems, for which Travis prepared musical arrangements for an "abbreviated version" in 2001. She composed the original music for A Star Danced (2003) and arranged a swing version of H.M.S. Pinafore, entitled Pinafore Swing, in 2004. One reviewer mentioned her "glorious arrangements".

She was the musical supervisor and orchestrator of the revival of Sweeney Todd, which started at the Watermill Theatre in 2004 and transferred to both the West End (2004) and Broadway (2005). Stephen Sondheim said of Travis' work on this production: "I think what she's done is absolutely brilliant.... The variety of sounds she's gotten out of the instruments and also the practical way in which they allow John [Doyle] to work with the performers onstage is extraordinary. But what got me most about the orchestrations is what they did for the play's atmosphere. These are wonderfully weird textures."

Travis was the musical supervisor and orchestrator for the Watermill and London revival of Mack and Mabel (2005–2006).

She is working with producer-director Craig Revel Horwood on several projects, in the theatre production company CRH Theatre Productions, including a jazz version of La Traviata and the 2010-11 UK tour of Chess, which also transferred to the Princess of Wales Theatre, Toronto, in September 2011. Their revival of Sunset Boulevard opened in the West End at the Comedy Theatre, in December 2008, after first playing at the Watermill Theatre in July 2008. The latest collaboration with Craig Revel-Horwood is Fiddler on the Roof, which is currently touring the UK with Paul Michael-Glaser as Tevye.
