= Larry Blank =

American composer, arranger, orchestrator, and conductor

- Born: July 15, 1952 (age 73); Brooklyn, New York
- Occupations: Composer; Orchestrator; Conductor
- Website: larryblankmusic.com

Larry Blank is an American composer, arranger, orchestrator and conductor. He has worked in film, theatre and television, and has been nominated for a Tony Award three times.

== Early life and education ==
Blank was born in Brooklyn, New York on July 15, 1952, and grew up in Bayside, Queens.

Blank studied drama at the High School of Performing Arts, Manhattan. He was mentored by Don Pippin, Irwin Kostal and Ralph Burns. Blank later studied conducting with Rudi Bennett and piano with Leslie Harnley. Blank then moved to Los Angeles to continue his studies in orchestration and composition under Kostal.

== Career ==
=== Conducting ===
Along with Alfred Newman and Glen Roven, Blank was one of the youngest conductors in Broadway history. He first conducted on Broadway at the age of 22, leading the orchestra as a replacement conductor for Goodtime Charley and other shows. On the recommendation of Donald Pippin, he was hired by Michael Bennett and Marvin Hamlisch as music director for the International Touring Co. productions of A Chorus Line and They're Playing Our Song. Several other productions followed, including Evita, Sugar Babies, La Cage Aux Folles, The Phantom of the Opera, Teddy and Alice, Onward Victoria, Copperfield, and Colette.

In March 1999, Blank conducted the 20th anniversary production of Sweeney Todd at the Ahmanson Theatre, Los Angeles, with Kelsey Grammer and Christine Baranski. In 2002, he was asked to conduct Sweeney Todd for the Kennedy Center Sondheim Celebration, as well as a subsequent production for Wolf Trap Opera.

Blank is a regular guest conductor and orchestrator for Friday Night is Music Night on BBC Radio 2. He has been associated with the Olivier Awards for 10 years as a musical supervisor and conductor. Blank is the resident POPS conductor for the Pasadena Symphony, California. He has guest conducted for the Opera de Toulon, including conducting their production of Bernstein's Wonderful Town.

Blank was the musical director for Katie Couric's Hollywood Hits Broadway and her fund-raising tribute to West Side Story. In February 2020, he conducted for Jerry Herman's memorial at the Lunt-Fontanne Theatre.

=== Arranging and orchestration ===
Blank has arranged two songs for the Boston Pops tribute to Jerry Herman, and two songs for American Idol. He was the conductor and arranger of Jerry Herman's title song for the film Barney's Great Adventure.

Blank has created orchestrations for Tommy Tune: White Tie and Tails, Three Coins in the Fountain, White Christmas and Roman Holiday at The Muny. He orchestrated and arranged Let the Eagle Fly, a musical about labor organizer Cesar Chavez. On the request from the composer Charles Fox, Blank orchestrated the ballet Zorro, performed by the San Francisco Ballet. He was the orchestrator for Barbara Cook’s Christmas CD Count Your Blessings, as well as Christine Andreas' CD Piaf: No Regrets. Blank was also the orchestrator for Jerry Herman's concept recording Miss Spectacular.

In 2012, his orchestrations were performed during Singin' in the Rain at the Palace Theatre, London. In 2019, Blank orchestrated and conducted the music for FX's Fosse/Verdon for the composer Alex Lacamoire. He was the arranger, orchestrator, and conductor for Dolly Parton's 2020 film, Christmas On The Square.

== Awards and nominations ==
Blank has been nominated for a Tony Award three times, for his orchestrations of Catch Me If You Can (with Marc Shaiman), White Christmas, and The Drowsy Chaperone. Blank's orchestration of eight songs for the Broadway production of The Producers was acknowledged by Doug Besterman and Mel Brooks at the 2001 Tony Awards after the show won Best Original Score.

He has been nominated six times for the Drama Desk Award for Outstanding Orchestrations for White Christmas, The Drowsy Chaperone, Catch Me If You Can, A Christmas Story, Honeymoon in Vegas and Fiddler on the Roof.
