= Thoroughly Modern Millie (musical) =

2002 musical with music by Jeanine Tesori

- Original Broadway Windowcard
- Music: Jeanine Tesori
- Lyrics: Dick Scanlan
- Book: Richard Morris; Dick Scanlan
- Basis: Thoroughly Modern Millie by Richard Morris; Chrysanthemum by Robin Chancellor; Neville Phillips; Robb Stewart
- Productions: 2000 La Jolla Playhouse; 2002 Broadway; 2003 US tour 2003 West End; 2005 UK tour 2017 UK tour
- Awards: Numerous, including: Tony Award for Best Musical; Drama Desk Award for Outstanding Musical

Thoroughly Modern Millie is a musical with music by Jeanine Tesori, lyrics by Dick Scanlan, and a book by Richard Morris and Scanlan. It is based on the 1967 film of the same name, which itself was based on the British musical Chrysanthemum, which opened in London in 1956. Thoroughly Modern Millie tells the story of a small-town girl, Millie Dillmount, who comes to New York City to marry for money instead of love – a thoroughly modern aim in 1922, when women were just entering the workforce. Millie soon begins to take delight in the flapper lifestyle, but problems arise when she checks into a hotel owned by the leader of a white slavery ring in China. The style of the musical is comic pastiche. Like the film on which it is based, it interpolates new tunes with some previously written songs.

After previews at the La Jolla Playhouse in San Diego, California, in October 2000, the show opened on Broadway on April 18, 2002. The production subsequently won six 2002 Tony Awards, including Best Musical. Due to the success of the original Broadway production, there was both a United States tour and a West End production launched in 2003, followed by a United Kingdom tour in 2005. The musical has since become a popular choice for high school productions, but has garnered controversy over its racial stereotyping of its Asian characters, and has been described as "a piece [that] walks the line of being entertaining and highly offensive".

== Synopsis ==
Act I

In 1922, Millie Dillmount arrives in New York City from Salina, Kansas. Determined to be successful, she tears up her return ticket ("Not for the Life of Me"). She bobs her hair for a modern "flapper" look ("Thoroughly Modern Millie"). She is soon mugged, losing her hat, scarf, purse and a shoe. Seeking help and in a panic, she trips bypasser Jimmy Smith, a handsome, carefree young man who goes through life on whims and wits. He lectures Millie on why she should return home: she is just another girl with false hopes who does not belong in the big city. Almost taking his advice, she changes her mind and yells after him, "Who needs a hat? Who needs a purse? And who needs YOU, mister whoever-you-are?!" and soon takes a room at the Hotel Priscilla for Single Women ("Not For the Life of Me [reprise]").

A week later, Millie is confronted by the mysterious and sinister Mrs. Meers, the hotel proprietress. A former actress, Meers now works for a white slavery ring in Hong Kong, kidnapping orphaned girls and shipping them to the Orient, which she has just done to Millie's hall mate, Ethel Peas. Mrs. Meers declares that Millie "has two minutes to pack, or find her things on the street!" Millie then meets the wealthy Miss Dorothy, who wants to learn how the poorer half lives ("How the Other Half Lives"), and asks to rent a hotel room. Millie suggests Miss Dorothy can room with her until another room become available, but only if Miss Dorothy pays the rent. Mrs. Meers says Millie can get a rent extension and Miss Dorothy can take room next to Millie's that just became available. When Millie asks what happened to Ethel, the former occupant, Mrs. Meers claims she got an acting job in the Orient.

In the hotel laundry room, two Chinese immigrants, Ching Ho and Bun Foo, are working for Mrs. Meers to earn enough money to bring their mother from Hong Kong over to the US ("Not for the Life of Me [reprise]").

After researching some of the richest and most eligible bachelors in the world, Millie comes to Sincere Trust, looking for a job and also to set her sights on the company's boss, Trevor Graydon III ("The Speed Test"). Her lightning speed stenography easily lands her the job. Meanwhile, Ching Ho attempts to capture Miss Dorothy for Mrs. Meers with a drugged apple but when he sees her, he falls in love with her instantly and wants to save her from Mrs. Meers. Before Dorothy eats the drugged apple, Millie arrives (Mrs. Meers has to act like she was getting a stain out of the carpet with "soy sauce") with the good news that she has found a job and a boss to marry. As the girls rush off to their rooms, Mrs. Meers thinks about how stupid the girls are never to realize her evil plan to ship them to Southeast Asia ("They Don't Know"). To celebrate their success the girls go to a speakeasy, where they meet Jimmy, but the club is raided by the police. While waiting for his release in the jail cell, Jimmy realizes that he loves Millie ("What Do I Need with Love").

Jimmy asks Millie to a party hosted by famous singer Muzzy van Hossmere, and she accepts. Before the party, Muzzy sings of her love for New York ("Only in New York"). At the party, Millie spills wine on Dorothy Parker's dress, which Millie tries to get out with soy sauce, following Mrs. Meers' example. After the party, Millie explains to Jimmy how she is going to marry Trevor. She also tells him off for being a "skirt chaser" and "womanizer." As they argue, Jimmy suddenly grabs Millie and kisses her, then runs away. Millie realizes that she loves Jimmy ("Jimmy"). Millie returns to the hotel and overhears a conversation between Miss Dorothy and Jimmy, "I really want to tell her, she's my best friend" followed by "You know we can't". Millie sees Jimmy sneaking out of Miss Dorothy's room after what appears to be a late-night tryst; confused and horrified, Millie decides she never wants anything to do with Jimmy ever again.

Act II

At Sincere Trust, Millie tells the other stenographers that she is "completely over" Jimmy, then realizes she is still in love; the girls try to convince her to let him go ("Forget About the Boy"). Millie places more conviction into marrying Graydon, but when Dorothy comes to visit Millie at work, Mr. Graydon is immediately smitten with her instead ("Ah! Sweet Mystery of Life"/"Falling in Love with Someone"). The two set up a date together. While Millie is brooding over her lost chances, Jimmy breaks in through the window and asks her to dinner. She initially tells him off but then agrees ("I Turned the Corner"/"Falling in Love with Someone" [Reprise]).

Back at the Hotel Priscilla, Mrs. Meers along with Ching Ho and Bun Foo get ready to drug Miss Dorothy, when Ching Ho refuses because he loves her. Mrs. Meers stops his ranting by reminding them of why they work for her, to raise money to see their mother again. She convinces them to go along with the plan ("Muqin").

Jimmy finally declares his feelings for Millie while washing dishes to pay their tab at Cafe Society while Muzzy is performing her hit ("Long As I'm Here with You"). Millie is confused by her feelings for Jimmy and her desire not to be poor and initially rejects him. She runs to Muzzy, who tells her she's a fool for throwing away true love for the sake of money. She tells the story of how she met her late husband, a supposedly poor but goodhearted man who gave her a green glass necklace. Regardless of his income status, she loved him anyway, and she later realized that her green glass necklace was actually genuine emerald. Millie reconsiders her feelings and finally realizes that she would rather have a green-glass love with Jimmy ("Gimme, Gimme").

Just as she returns to Jimmy to confess her feelings, they encounter Graydon, who was stood up by Miss Dorothy for their date, and is drunkenly singing, annoying Dexter and his wife, Daphne, who are also on a date. Graydon tells Millie and Jimmy that Mrs. Meers told him Miss Dorothy had checked out of the hotel. When Millie recalls that several other tenants had also suddenly "checked out", and that all of them were orphans, Millie, Jimmy, and Graydon realize what Mrs. Meers is doing. They persuade Muzzy to pose as a new orphan in town to trick Mrs. Meers, who takes the bait, is exposed as the mastermind of the slavery ring, and is then taken to the police station. Meanwhile, Ching Ho had already rescued Miss Dorothy and won her heart.

Jimmy proposes to Millie, and, poor as he is, she accepts, "because if it's marriage I've got in mind, love has everything to do with it." Jimmy turns out to be Herbert J. van Hossmere III, Muzzy's stepson, and one of the most eligible bachelors in the world. And Miss Dorothy turns out to be his sister, an heiress named Dorothy Carnegie Mellon Vanderbilt van Hossmere, and (unlike the 1967 film) she ends up not with the dismayed Trevor Graydon, but with Ching Ho. Muzzy reveals that to help Jimmy and Dorothy avoid getting caught by fortune-hunters, she sent them out into the world so that they could find spouses who weren't in it for the money. Both Jimmy and Dorothy had disguised their family name to avoid being found out as society heirs. In a final pairing, Bun Foo joins Graydon's company as a new stenographer after telling Graydon that he can type fifty words a minute. At the very end of the musical (after the bows), Bun Foo and Ching Ho are once again reunited with their mother ("Curtain Call/Bows").

== Principal roles ==
Characters	Role Type	Description
Millie Dillmount	Lead	A young, "modern" woman from Salina, Kansas. Originally, her goal was to marry for wealth, rather than love.
Jimmy Smith	Lead	An attractive young paperclip salesman. He does not show pride in his wealth.
Miss Dorothy Brown	Lead	A new actress from California, Millie's best friend.
Mrs. Meers	Support	Evil owner of the Hotel Priscilla who is a former actress. Leader of a white slavery ring in the Orient.
Trevor Graydon III	Support	Sincere Trust Insurance Co. Head.
Muzzy van Hossmere	Support	Singer and bon vivant, stepmother of Jimmy and Dorothy. She was the second wife of her late husband.
Ching Ho	Support	Chinese henchman, falls in love with Miss Dorothy.
Bun Foo	Support	Chinese henchman, focused more on the task at hand.
Miss Peg Flannery	Support	Curmudgeonly head stenographer at Sincere Trust.

== Producers ==
Whoopi Goldberg is credited as one of the producers; the Tony win for Best Musical in 2002 earned Goldberg the "T" in her EGOT status.

== Cast lists ==
Character	Demo	La Jolla Playhouse	Broadway	US Tour	West End	First UK Tour	Fort Worth TX	Second UK Tour
Character	1999	2000	2002	2003		2005	2014	2017
Millie Dillmount	Kristin Chenoweth	Sutton Foster	Sutton Foster	Darcie Roberts	Amanda Holden	Donna Steele	Anneliese van der Pol	Joanne Clifton
Jimmy Smith	David Campbell	Jim Stanek	Gavin Creel	Matt Cavenaugh	Mark McGee	Richard Reynard	Sam Barrett	Sam Barrett
Mrs Meers	Bea Arthur	Harriet Sansom Harris	Harriet Sansom Harris	Hollis Resnik	Maureen Lipman; Marti Webb	Lesley Joseph; Elaine C. Smith	Michelle Collins; Lucas Rush	Michelle Collins
Miss Dorothy Brown	Amanda Serkasevich	Sarah Uriarte Berry	Angela Christian	Diana Kaarina	Helen Baker	Robyn North	Katherine Glover	Katherine Glover
Mr Trevor Graydon	Marc Kudisch	Marc Kudisch	Marc Kudisch	Sean Allan Krill	Craig Urbani	Andrew Kennedy	Graham MacDuff	Graham MacDuff
Muzzy Van Hossmere	Yvette Cason	Tonya Pinkins	Sheryl Lee Ralph	Pamela Isaacs	Sheila Ferguson	Grace Kennedy	Jenny Fitzpatrick	Jenny Fitzpatrick
Miss Flannery	Ruth Williamson	Anne L. Nathan	Anne L. Nathan	Janelle A. Robinson	Rachel Izen	Nicola Blackman	Catherine Mort	Catherine Mort
Ching Ho	Ken Leung	Stephen Sable	Ken Leung	Andrew Pang	Yo Santhaveesuk	Yo Santhaveesuk	Damian Buhagiar	Damian Buhagiar
Bun Foo	Francis Jue	Francis Jue	Francis Jue	Darren Lee	Unku	Unku	Andy Yau	Andy Yau
Rita	N/A	N/A	Jessica Grove	Heather Parcells	Rachel Barrell	Emily Shaw	Emma Housley	Emma Housley
Ruth	N/A	N/A	Megan Sikora	Laura Shoop	Zoe Hardman	Emma-Gina King	Lotty Somers	Lotty Somers
Ethel	Unknown	Unknown	Joyce Chittick	Bradley Benjamin	Vikki Coote	Victoria Hay	Katherine Glover	Katherine Glover
Gloria	N/A	N/A	JoAnn M. Hunter	Juliana Ashley Hansen	Donna Steele	Lauren Adams	Alice Baker	Alice Baker
Alice	N/A	N/A	Alisa Klein	Diane Veronica Phelan	Selina Chilton	Laure Clemments	Laura Marie Benson	Laura Marie Benson
Lucille	N/A	N/A	Kate Baldwin	N/A	Gabriella Khan	Vanessa Barnby	N/A	N/A
Cora	N/A	N/A	Catherine Brunell	Renee Monique Brown	Nancy Wei George	Nicky Wilson	N/A	N/A

=== Notable replacements ===
==== Broadway (2002–04) ====
- Millie Dillmount: Susan Egan, Catherine Brunell (u/s)
- Jimmy Smith: Christian Borle, Cheyenne Jackson (u/s), Darren Ritchie (u/s)
- Mrs Meers: Delta Burke, Dixie Carter
- Miss Dorothy Brown: Kate Baldwin (u/s), Megan McGinnis (u/s)
- Mr Trevor Graydon: Christopher Sieber, Ben Davis, Kevin Earley, Cheyenne Jackson (u/s)
- Muzzy Van Hossmere: Leslie Uggams
- Ching Ho: Francis Jue (u/s)
- Lucille: Megan McGinnis

== Song list ==
Songs are by Tesori and Scanlan, unless otherwise noted.

Act I

- "Overture" — Orchestra
- "Not for the Life of Me" — Millie
- "Thoroughly Modern Millie" — Millie & Moderns
  - Music by Jimmy Van Heusen and lyrics by Sammy Cahn
- "Not for the Life of Me (Tag)" — Millie & the Hotel Girls
- "How the Other Half Lives" — Millie & Miss Dorothy
- + "How the Other Half Lives (reprise)" - Millie and Miss Dorothy
- "Not for the Life of Me (Reprise)" — Bun Foo and Ching Ho
- "The Speed Test" — Trevor Graydon, Millie, Stenographers & Office Singers
  - Elements taken from "My eyes are fully open" by Gilbert and Sullivan
- "They Don't Know" — Mrs. Meers
- "The Nuttycracker Suite" - Orchestra
  - Elements taken from Tchaikovsky's Nutcracker Suite
- "What Do I Need with Love?" - Jimmy
- "Only in New York" — Muzzy
- "Jimmy" — Millie
  - Music and lyrics by Jay Thompson

Act II

- "Entr'acte" — Orchestra
- "Back at Work"- Millie, Miss Flannery, Women Office Singers
- "Forget About the Boy" — Millie, Miss Flannery, Women Office Singers, Stenographers
- "Ah! Sweet Mystery of Life/Falling in Love with Someone" — Trevor Graydon and Miss Dorothy
  - Cover of "Ah! Sweet Mystery of Life" by Victor Herbert
- "I Turned the Corner/Falling in Love with Someone (Reprise)" — Millie, Jimmy, Miss Dorothy, Trevor Graydon
- "Muqin" — Mrs. Meers, Bun Foo, Ching Ho
  - Cover of "My Mammy", music by Walter Donaldson and lyrics by Joe Young and Sam M. Lewis
- "Long as I'm Here with You" — Muzzy & Muzzy's Boys
- "Gimme Gimme" — Millie
- + "The Speed Test (Reprise)" — Millie, Trevor Graydon, Jimmy
- + "Ah! Sweet Mystery (Reprise)" — Miss Dorothy and Ching Ho
- "Thoroughly Modern Millie (Reprise)" — Jimmy, Miss Dorothy & Moderns
- "Curtain Call/Bows" — Cast

+ not included in Broadway Cast Recording

An original Broadway cast recording is available on the RCA Victor label.

== Productions ==
Broadway

The musical, directed by Michael Mayer, underwent several workshops in New York in 1999. Included in the workshops casts were Kristin Chenoweth, Marc Kudisch, and Beatrice Arthur.

It then played out-of-town tryouts at the La Jolla Playhouse at University of California, San Diego in October 2000 through December 2000. Despite nurturing the role through the workshop process, Kristin Chenoweth did not continue with the role of Millie in order to film her own sitcom. She was replaced by Erin Dilly, but prior to public previews, Sutton Foster, her understudy, was chosen to assume the title role, a move that propelled her to stardom.

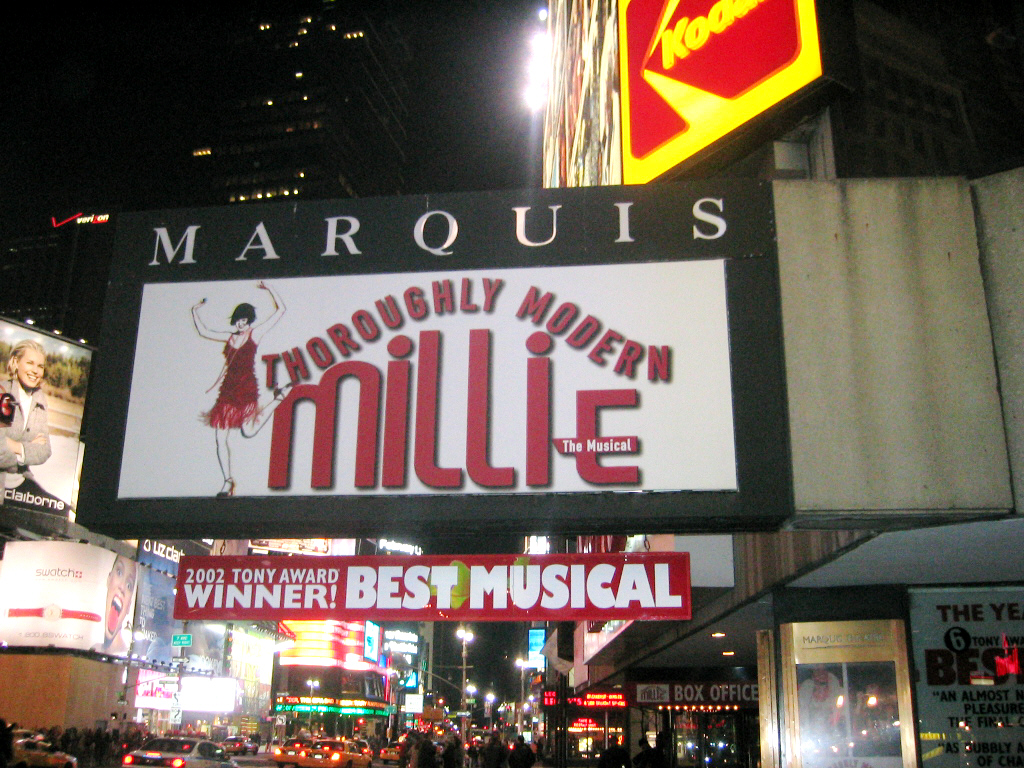
At the Marquis Theatre, 2003

After a long production history, the musical premiered on Broadway at the Marquis Theatre on April 18, 2002 and closed on June 20, 2004 after 903 performances and 32 previews. Directed by Michael Mayer and choreographed by Rob Ashford, orchestration was by Doug Besterman and the late Ralph Burns, scenic design was by David Gallo, costume design was by Martin Pakledinaz, and lighting design was by Donald Holder. The original cast included Sutton Foster as Millie, Marc Kudisch as Trevor, Angela Christian as Miss Dorothy, Gavin Creel as Jimmy, Harriet Sansom Harris as Mrs. Meers, Sheryl Lee Ralph as Muzzy Van Hossmere, Ken Leung as Ching Ho, Francis Jue as Bun Foo, and Anne L. Nathan as Miss Flannery.

Replacements later in the run included Susan Egan as Millie, Delta Burke and Dixie Carter as Mrs. Meers, Christian Borle as Jimmy, Christopher Sieber and Kevin Earley as Trevor Graydon, Leslie Uggams as Muzzy, and Liz McCartney as Miss Flannery. Cheyenne Jackson also joined the cast as ensemble and an understudy for the two male leads. At the April 2, 2003 performance, Meredith Vieira appeared in three minor roles for a segment later broadcast on her daytime talk show The View.

The original Broadway production won six Tony Awards and five Drama Desk Awards, including the win for Best Musical at both award ceremonies.

London

In 2003, the original creative team reunited to stage the show in London's West End at the Shaftesbury Theatre. It began previews on October 11 and opened on October 21. UK TV personality Amanda Holden starred in the title role, with Maureen Lipman and Marti Webb alternating as Mrs. Meers and Sheila Ferguson as Muzzy Van Hossmere. When Webb subsequently left the production to join Tell Me on a Sunday, Mrs. Meers was played by Anita Dobson, and when Holden was forced to take time off due to illness, her understudy Donna Steele took over the role to great acclaim. Despite positive reviews and booking periods extended to January 2005, Thoroughly Modern Millie failed to catch the UK public's attention and closed on June 26, 2004.

UK tour

A UK tour beginning in March 2005 fared much better and successfully toured many of the country's major theatres until November, when it closed as planned in Nottingham. The tour starred Steele as Millie, Lesley Joseph as Mrs. Meers, and Grace Kennedy as Muzzy Van Hossmere.

School edition

The school edition of Thoroughly Modern Millie was premiered at the International Thespian Festival on June 26, 2007. It was presented by the International Thespian Cast. The production starred Elizabeth Elliott as Millie, David King as Jimmy, and Rachel Buethe as Mrs. Meers. The creators of the show also appeared at the festival to help introduce the show.

2017 / 2018 UK Tour

A new UK tour began in January 2016 with direction and choreography by Racky Plews. The tour starred Joanne Clifton as Millie, Michelle Collins as Mrs. Meers (until March 2016) when the role was taken over by Lucas Rush. The tour closed in June 2016.

A 2018 UK tour starring Hayley Tamaddon and directed/choreographed by Racky Plews will start in March 2018 at Richmond Theatre. It will play Eastbourne, Sunderland, Oxford, Torquay, Poole, Stoke, Bradford, Darlington, Southend and Wolverhampton. More dates and further casting TBA.

International productions

A German edition named "Höllisch Moderne Millie" (Infernal Modern Millie) premiered on October 26, 2018 at Hof Theatre.

A Japanese production of Thoroughly Modern Millie premiered at The Imperial Theatre and went on tour in September 2022, It will also be performed again at The Imperial Theatre and go on tour once more in July 2024. They both feature Manato Asaka as Millie Dillmount.

== Awards and nominations ==
=== Original Broadway production ===
Year	Award Ceremony	Category	Nominee	Result
2002	Drama Desk Award	Outstanding Musical		Won
2002	Drama Desk Award	Outstanding Book of a Musical	Dick Scanlan and Richard Morris	Nominated
2002	Drama Desk Award	Outstanding Actress in a Musical	Sutton Foster	Won
2002	Drama Desk Award	Outstanding Featured Actor in a Musical	Marc Kudisch	Nominated
2002	Drama Desk Award	Outstanding Featured Actress in a Musical	Harriet Sansom Harris	Won
2002	Drama Desk Award	Outstanding Director of a Musical	Michael Mayer	Won
2002	Drama Desk Award	Outstanding Choreography	Rob Ashford	Nominated
2002	Drama Desk Award	Outstanding Orchestrations	Doug Besterman and Ralph Burns	Won
2002	Drama Desk Award	Outstanding Lyrics	Dick Scanlan	Nominated
2002	Drama Desk Award	Outstanding Music	Jeanine Tesori	Nominated
2002	Drama Desk Award	Outstanding Set Design	David Gallo	Nominated
2002	Drama Desk Award	Outstanding Costume Design	Martin Pakledinaz	Nominated
2002	Tony Award	Best Musical		Won
2002	Tony Award	Best Book of a Musical	Dick Scanlan and Richard Morris	Nominated
2002	Tony Award	Best Original Score	Jeanine Tesori and Dick Scanlan	Nominated
2002	Tony Award	Best Performance by a Leading Actor in a Musical	Gavin Creel	Nominated
2002	Tony Award	Best Performance by a Leading Actress in a Musical	Sutton Foster	Won
2002	Tony Award	Best Performance by a Featured Actor in a Musical	Marc Kudisch	Nominated
2002	Tony Award	Best Performance by a Featured Actress in a Musical	Harriet Sansom Harris	Won
2002	Tony Award	Best Direction of a Musical	Michael Mayer	Nominated
2002	Tony Award	Best Choreography	Rob Ashford	Won
2002	Tony Award	Best Orchestrations	Doug Besterman and Ralph Burns	Won
2002	Tony Award	Best Costume Design	Martin Pakledinaz	Won

=== Original London production ===
Year	Award Ceremony	Category	Nominee	Result
2004	Laurence Olivier Award	Best New Musical		Nominated
2004	Laurence Olivier Award	Best Actress in a Musical	Amanda Holden	Nominated
2004	Laurence Olivier Award	Best Actress in a Musical	Maureen Lipman	Nominated
2004	Laurence Olivier Award	Best Theatre Choreographer	Rob Ashford	Nominated
2004	Laurence Olivier Award	Best Costume Design	Martin Pakledinaz	Nominated

== Racial stereotyping controversy ==
Since the musical became a popular choice for high school productions due to its Tony awards and multiple roles for boys and girls, controversy has arisen about the racial stereotyping of Asian people. The subplot of the show in which Mrs. Meers, a white woman, disguises herself as a Chinese woman and runs a white slavery ring with assistance of two recent Chinese male immigrants, Ching Ho and Bun Foo, plays on the close differences between satire and racism. According to the musical play writer, Dick Scanlan, the musical aims to shatter racist stereotypes and allows the audience to experience “the chasm between the stereotype and the real thing”. The original actor for Bun Foo, Francis Jue, also said “this show can be done racist but it doesn’t have to and actually it can actually be anti-racist…And the Chinese guys are the heroes of the story”. A 2020 Encores! production was announced starring Ashley Park in the title role with book revisions by playwright Lauren Yee. The proposed revisions sought to address some of the racist and sexist elements of the show, but the production was canceled due to COVID-19.

Recent Public Protests
Date	Location	Outcome
January 2014	Dalton School, Manhattan, NY	Show cancelled; then script revised
March 2015	Newton North High School, MA	Theatre Director apologized in public
December 2015	Philadelphia High School for the Creative and Performing Arts, PA	Show cancelled
April 2019	Levittown Division Ave High School, Levittown, NY	Superintendent confirmed not to perform the show again
April 2019	Huntington High School, Huntington, NY	Superintendent apologized, confirmed not to perform the show and promised to add cultural proficiency program in the school district

== See also ==
- Roaring Twenties
- Human trafficking in China
