= LoveMusik =

- Poster for LoveMusik
- Music: Kurt Weill
- Lyrics: Various
- Book: Alfred Uhry
- Basis: Lives of Kurt Weill and Lotte Lenya
- Productions: 2007 Broadway; 2016 Buenos Aires

LoveMusik is a musical written by Alfred Uhry, using a selection of music by Kurt Weill. The story explores the romance and lives of Kurt Weill and Lotte Lenya, based on Speak Low (When You Speak Love): The Letters of Kurt Weill and Lotte Lenya, edited and translated by Lys Symonette and Kim H. Kowalke. Harold Prince had read Speak Low and suggested the idea for a musical to Uhry. Uhry and Prince worked on LoveMusik for four years to develop it into a stage work. The story spans over 25 years, from the first meeting of Lenya and Weill as struggling young artists, to their popularity in Europe and America, to Weill's death from a heart attack at age 50.

== Productions ==
The musical was produced on Broadway as a limited run by the Manhattan Theatre Club at the Biltmore Theatre beginning previews on April 12, 2007, opening on May 3, 2007, and closing on June 24, 2007. The show was directed by Harold Prince with musical staging by Patricia Birch and starred Michael Cerveris as Kurt Weill, Donna Murphy as Lotte Lenya, David Pittu as Bertolt Brecht and John Scherer as George Davis. The ensemble included Judith Blazer, Edwin Cahill, Herndon Lackey, Erik Liberman, Ann Morrison, Graham Rowat, Rachel Ulanet and Jessica Wright.

The production received mixed to positive reviews. It was noted for the performances of Donna Murphy and Michael Cerveris. For example, the TheaterMania reviewer wrote: "Cerveris – calculatedly diffident and consistently sympathetic as the dour Weill." Ben Brantley, reviewing for The New York Times, wrote: "Two luminous, life-infused portraits glow from within a dim, heavy frame at the Biltmore Theater, where LoveMusik opened last night. This bio-musical about the marital and professional relationship of the German-born composer Kurt Weill and the actress Lotte Lenya, directed by Harold Prince, is sluggish, tedious and (hold your breath) unmissable—at least for anyone who cherishes stars who mold songs into thrilling windows of revelation."

=== Japanese production ===
A production of LoveMusik was confirmed for Japan for the 2009–2010 Japanese theatre season. The production was translated entirely into Japanese. Masachika Ichimura was cast as Kurt Weill in the Japanese production.

== Plot synopsis ==
Act I

In 1924, Weill is visiting a friend in Europe, and Lenya is sent to meet him. They are immediately attracted to each other and their subsequent romance and marriage follow the course of events in pre-World War II Germany. Weill collaborates with Bertolt Brecht, and the two write The Threepenny Opera, among other important works. But Brecht's ego and politics cause a rift, and the two part. Weill and Lenya divorce and later remarry. As the Jewish Weill becomes a popular and successful composer, Weill and Lenya are forced to leave Germany.

Act II

Now in the United States, Weill has successful musicals produced on Broadway, such as Lady in the Dark, and also spends time in California. The couple have an open marriage – both have other romantic interests; and Weill is a workaholic. But they remain with each other until his death in 1950. Lenya, although devastated at his loss, is urged to return to the stage in Weill's The Threepenny Opera.

The musical uses songs written by Weill for stage musicals such as One Touch of Venus, The Threepenny Opera, Rise and Fall of the City of Mahagonny, Street Scene, Knickerbocker Holiday, and Happy End, as well as individual songs.

== Musical numbers ==
Act I

- Speak Low (Lyrics by Ogden Nash) — Kurt Weill and Lotte Lenya
- Nanna's Lied (Lyrics by Bertolt Brecht) — Woman on Stairs
- Kiddush — Weill's Family
- Songs of the Rhineland (Lyrics by Ira Gershwin) — Lenya's Family
- Klops Lied (Meatball Song) — Kurt Weill
- Berlin im Licht — Lotte Lenya
- Wooden Wedding (Lyrics by Ogden Nash) — Kurt Weill, Lotte Lenya, Magistrate and Court Secretary
- Tango Ballad (Lyrics by Bertolt Brecht) — Bertolt Brecht and Brecht's Women
- Alabama Song (Lyrics by Bertolt Brecht) — Auditioners and Lotte Lenya
- Girl of the Moment (Lyrics by Ira Gershwin) — Ensemble
- Moritat (Lyrics by Bertolt Brecht) — Bertolt Brecht, Lotte Lenya, Otto and Ensemble
- Schickelgruber (Lyrics by Howard Dietz) — Kurt Weill and Bertolt Brecht
- Come to Paris (Lyrics by Ira Gershwin) — Ensemble
- I Don't Love You (Lyrics by Maurice Magre) — Kurt Weill and Lotte Lenya
- Wouldn't You Like to Be on Broadway (Lyrics by Langston Hughes and Elmer Rice) — Kurt Weill and Lotte Lenya
- Alabama Song (Reprise) (Lyrics by Bertolt Brecht) — Lotte Lenya, Kurt Weill, Bertolt Brecht and Ensemble

Act II

- How Can You Tell an American (Lyrics by Maxwell Anderson) — Ensemble
- Very, Very, Very (Lyrics by Ogden Nash) — Kurt Weill
- It's Never Too Late to Mendelssohn (Lyrics by Ira Gershwin) — Kurt Weill, Lotte Lenya, Stenographer and Judge
- Surabaya Johnny (Lyrics by Bertolt Brecht) — Lotte Lenya
- Youkali (Lyrics by Roger Fernay) — Bertolt Brecht and Brecht's Women
- Buddy on the Night Shift (Lyrics by Oscar Hammerstein II) — Allen Lake
- That's Him (Lyrics by Ogden Nash) — Kurt Weill
- Hosannah Rockefeller (Lyrics by Bertolt Brecht) — Bertolt Brecht and Brecht's Women
- I Don't Love You (Reprise) (Lyrics by Maurice Magre) — Lotte Lenya and Kurt Weill
- The Illusion Wedding Show (Lyrics by Alan Jay Lerner) — George Davis and Ensemble
- It Never Was You (Lyrics by Maxwell Anderson) — Kurt Weill
- A Bird of Passage (Lyrics by Maxwell Anderson) — Ensemble
- September Song (Lyrics by Maxwell Anderson) — Lotte Lenya and George Davis

== Recording ==
LoveMusik (the world premiere recording) was recorded in July 2007 at Avatar Studios in New York City and was released on November 27, 2007, by Ghostlight Records (an imprint of Sh-K-Boom Records).

== Awards and nominations ==
=== Original Broadway production ===
Year	Award	Category	Nominee	Result
2007	Tony Award	Best Performance by a Leading Actor in a Musical	Michael Cerveris	Nominated
2007	Tony Award	Best Performance by a Leading Actress in a Musical	Donna Murphy	Nominated
2007	Tony Award	Best Performance by a Featured Actor in a Musical	David Pittu	Nominated
2007	Tony Award	Best Orchestrations	Jonathan Tunick	Nominated
2007	Drama Desk Award	Outstanding Musical		Nominated
2007	Drama Desk Award	Outstanding Book of a Musical	Alfred Uhry	Nominated
2007	Drama Desk Award	Outstanding Actor in a Musical	Michael Cerveris	Nominated
2007	Drama Desk Award	Outstanding Actress in a Musical	Donna Murphy	Won
2007	Drama Desk Award	Outstanding Featured Actor in a Musical	David Pittu	Nominated
2007	Drama Desk Award	Outstanding Choreography	Patricia Birch	Nominated
2007	Drama Desk Award	Outstanding Director of a Musical	Harold Prince	Nominated
2007	Drama Desk Award	Outstanding Orchestrations	Jonathan Tunick	Won
2007	Drama Desk Award	Outstanding Set Design	Beowulf Boritt	Nominated
2007	Drama Desk Award	Outstanding Costume Design	Judith Dolan	Nominated
2007	Drama Desk Award	Outstanding Lighting Design	Howell Binkley	Nominated
2007	Drama Desk Award	Outstanding Sound Design	Duncan Robert Edwards	Nominated
