= Doug Besterman =

American orchestrator, musical arranger and music producer

- Born: Douglas Besterman; February 3, 1965 (age 61)
- Education: University of Rochester (BM)
- Occupations: Orchestrator; Musical arranger Music producer
- Known for: Fosse, The Producers, Thoroughly Modern Millie
- Style: Musical theatre
- Awards: Tony Award for Best Orchestrations; Drama Desk Award for Outstanding Orchestrations

Douglas Besterman (born February 3, 1965) is an American orchestrator, musical arranger and music producer. He is the recipient of four Tony Awards out of seven total nominations and two Drama Desk Awards out of six total nominations, and was a 2009 Grammy Award nominee.

== Personal life ==
Besterman currently resides in New York. Doug grew up in the New York suburb of Monsey. He attended Ramapo High School and the Eastman School of Music at the University of Rochester. His father (Kenny Besterman) was a child performer on The Horn and Hardart Children's Hour. Besterman married Alida Michal in 2021. He has three children from previous marriages.

== Career ==
Besterman found work in New York City in 1986 as a rehearsal pianist. In 1990, he met Danny Troob, who recommended Besterman to work on an Off-Broadway musical with Alan Menken. Besterman then began an extensive career in film with Lincoln (1992), subsequently orchestrating Disney's Pocahontas in 1995.

He made his Broadway debut with Damn Yankees (1994), for which he was nominated for a Drama Desk Award for Outstanding Orchestrations. Besterman was also nominated for the latter in 1997, with Big: the Musical. He won his first Tony Award for Best Orchestrations in 1999, for orchestrating Fosse with Ralph Burns.

Besterman was nominated for the Tony Award for The Music Man in 2000, for which he also received his third Drama Desk Award nomination.

Besterman won his second Tony Award and his first Drama Desk Award for the Broadway and West End productions of The Producers (2001). In 2002, he shared these awards with Ralph Burns for the original Broadway production of Thoroughly Modern Millie, starring Sutton Foster. Burns had died in November 2001 and Besterman accepted the awards. In his acceptance speech at the 2002 Tony Awards, Besterman was quoted as saying, "I'm sad to be here without him."

In 2001, Besterman orchestrated Rodgers and Hammerstein's score in the TV movie South Pacific. In 2002 he served as orchestrator for the Academy Award-winning film adaptation of Chicago. Besterman also arranged music for the 2003 film Piglet's Big Movie.

In 2004, Besterman orchestrated music for the original productions of Dracula, the Musical at the La Jolla Playhouse and Broadway's Belasco Theatre.

Besterman provided orchestrations and arrangements for the 2005 West End production of Guys and Dolls.

Also in 2005, Besterman reunited with The Producers composer Mel Brooks for the film version of the same name. He again worked with Brooks on his 2007 musical adaptation of Young Frankenstein, for which he was nominated for his sixth Drama Desk Award and first Grammy Award.

Besterman worked with writer Debra Fordham and composers Jeff Marx and Robert Lopez for a musical episode of Scrubs, titled "My Musical", which aired in 2007. Some described initial misgivings that the musical concept would make the episode seem gimmicky, but these fears were, for the most part, put to rest by the fact that the episode was "logically insane."

In 2008, Besterman orchestrated songs for the Houston, Texas, premiere of The Gershwins' An American In Paris, a musical adaptation of the 1951 film of the same name. It played from April 29, 2008, to June 22, 2008.

In concerts, Besterman has orchestrated performances for Mel Brooks and Chita Rivera at the Kennedy Center Honors, Beyoncé Knowles' 2002 benefit concert, and the "Stephen Sondheim 75th Birthday Celebration" with the Los Angeles Philharmonic. In addition, he has worked with the Boston Pops Orchestra and the Hollywood Bowl Orchestra.

Orchestrations for ballets include Take Five (More Or Less) (Pacific Northwest Ballet), Double Feature (New York City Ballet), and But Not For Me (Martha Graham Dance Company); all of these were choreographed by Susan Stroman.

He wrote orchestrations to the La Jolla Playhouse's 2010 production of Limelight: The Story of Charlie Chaplin. He orchestrated songs for a musical adaptation, titled Elf the Musical, of the 2003 film Elf, which played at the Al Hirschfeld Theatre on Broadway in winter 2010.

Besterman was the orchestrator for Rob Ashford's 2011 Broadway revival of Frank Loesser's How to Succeed in Business Without Really Trying, starring Daniel Radcliffe, for which he has been nominated for his fifth Tony Award for Best Orchestrations. For this production, Besterman scaled down the orchestra: "Music director David Chase and orchestrator Doug Besterman explored ways to honor the contributions of the original music team (music director Elliot Lawrence and orchestrator Robert Ginzler) while capitalizing on the assets of a streamlined 14-member orchestra." When describing Besterman's approach for these new orchestrations, producers Craig Zadan and Neil Meron wrote:

They decided to not use strings (other than a harp) and to think in terms of a muscular jazz ensemble rather than a symphonic sound. Jo Sullivan Loesser (Frank Loesser’s widow and a renowned performer in her own right) was very excited to go down this new path with the score. Inspiration came from the work of 1950s arranger Marty Paich, whose Dek-Tette recordings (most famously with Mel Tormé) found fresh and versatile sounds from a 10-member ensemble (5 brass, 3 saxes, bass and drums). Added to our mix were guitar (muted guitar vamp figures were a favorite of Ginzler’s, as in "Gotta Stop That Man"), percussion (for the Latin sounds so popular at the time as exemplified by "Coffee Break"), piano (you can’t do this show without a nod to Grieg), and harp (for over-the-top romanticism in "Rosemary").

He also provided orchestrations for the London, Broadway, and Hamburg productions of the musical Sister Act. These productions opened on June 2, 2009 (London), December 2, 2010 (Hamburg), and April 20, 2011 (Broadway).

Besterman provided orchestrations for the 2011 film remake of Winnie the Pooh, with music and lyrics by Robert Lopez and Kristen Anderson-Lopez, with contributions by The Sherman Brothers.

Besterman orchestrated, with Michael Starobin, the Roundabout Theatre Company's musical The People in the Picture (2011), concerning a grandmother recalling her life in the Yiddish theater and the Holocaust. Besterman will also provide orchestrations for the upcoming MCC Theater revival of the 1988 musical Carrie.

== Discography ==
- All credits as music producer.

Title	Performer	Label
A Love Like Ours	Barbra Streisand	Sony/Columbia Records
Timeless: Live in Concert	Barbra Streisand	Sony/Columbia Records
Manilow Sings Sinatra	Barry Manilow	Arista Records
Oscar and Steve	Mandy Patinkin	Nonesuch Records
Mamaloschen	Mandy Patinkin	Nonesuch Records
Kidults	Mandy Patinkin	Nonesuch Records
Experiment	Mandy Patinkin	Nonesuch Records
Standing Room Only	Jerry Hadley	Bertelsmann Music Group
Here’s To The Ladies	Christine Andreas	—N/a

== Stage credits ==
Year	Title	Role	Venue	Ref.
1994	Damn Yankees	Orchestrations	Broadway, Marquis Theatre	
1995	Gentlemen Prefer Blondes	Orchestrations	Broadway, Lyceum Theatre	
1996	Big	Orchestrations	Broadway, Shubert Theatre	
1997	King David	Orchestrations	Broadway, New Amsterdam Theatre	
1999	Fosse	Orchestrations	Broadway, Broadhurst Theatre	
2000	The Music Man	Orchestrations	Broadway, Neil Simon Theatre	
2000	Seussical	Orchestrations	Broadway, Richard Rodgers Theatre	
2001	The Producers	Orchestrations	Broadway, St. James Theatre	
2002	Thoroughly Modern Millie	Orchestrations	Broadway, Marquis Theatre	
2004	Dracula the Musical	Orchestrations	Broadway, Belasco Theatre	
2006	Tarzan	Orchestrations	Broadway, Richard Rodgers Theatre	
2007	Young Frankenstein	Orchestrations	Broadway, Hilton Theatre	
2010	Elf	Orchestrations	Broadway, Al Hirschfeld Theatre	
2011	How to Succeed in Business Without Really Trying	Orchestrations	Broadway, Al Hirschfeld Theatre	
2011	Sister Act	Orchestrations	Broadway, Broadway Theatre	
2011	On a Clear Day You Can See Forever	Orchestrations	Broadway, St. James Theatre	
2012	Annie	Additional orchestrations	Broadway, Palace Theatre	
2012	Elf	Orchestrations	Broadway, Al Hirschfeld Theatre	
2013	Cinderella	Additional orchestrations	Broadway, Broadway Theatre	
2014	Rocky	Orchestrations	Broadway, Winter Garden Theatre	
2014	Aladdin	Additional orchestrations	Broadway, New Amsterdam Theatre	
2014	Bullets Over Broadway	Orchestrations	Broadway, St. James Theatre	
2015	It Shoulda Been You	Orchestrations	Broadway, Brooks Atkinson Theatre	
2016	A Bronx Tale	Orchestrations	Broadway, Longacre Theatre	
2017	Charlie and the Chocolate Factory	Orchestrations	Broadway, Lunt-Fontanne Theatre	
2017	Anastasia	Orchestrations	Broadway, Broadhurst Theatre	
2024	Elf	Orchestrations	Broadway, Marquis Theatre	
2024	Death Becomes Her	Orchestrations	Broadway, Lunt-Fontanne Theatre	
2025	Boop! The Musical	Orchestrations	Broadway, Broadhurst Theatre	
2025	Smash	Orchestrations	Broadway, Imperial Theatre	
2026	Schmigadoon!	Orchestrations	Broadway, Nederlander Theatre	

== Awards and nominations ==
Year	Award	Category	Work	Result	Ref.
1999	Tony Award	Best Orchestrations	Fosse	Won	
2001	Tony Award	Best Orchestrations	The Producers	Won	
2001	Drama Desk Award	Outstanding Orchestrations	The Producers	Won	
2002	Tony Award	Best Orchestrations	Thoroughly Modern Millie	Won	
2002	Drama Desk Award	Outstanding Orchestrations	Thoroughly Modern Millie	Won	
1994	Drama Desk Award	Outstanding Orchestrations	Damn Yankees	Nominated	
1997	Drama Desk Award	Outstanding Orchestrations	Big	Nominated	
2000	Tony Award	Best Orchestrations	The Music Man	Nominated	
2000	Drama Desk Award	Outstanding Orchestrations	The Music Man	Nominated	
2008	Drama Desk Award	Outstanding Orchestrations	Young Frankenstein	Nominated	
2009	Grammy Award	Best Musical Theater Album	Young Frankenstein	Nominated	
2011	Tony Award	Best Orchestrations	How to Succeed in Business Without Really Trying	Nominated	
2014	Tony Award	Best Orchestrations	Bullets Over Broadway	Nominated	
2017	Outer Critics Circle Award	Outstanding Orchestrations	Anastasia	Nominated	
2017	Drama Desk Award	Outstanding Orchestrations	Anastasia	Nominated	
2025	Drama Desk Award	Outstanding Orchestrations	Boop! The Musical	Nominated	
2025	Outer Critics Circle Award	Outstanding Orchestrations	Death Becomes Her	Nominated	
2026	Outer Critics Circle Award	Outstanding Orchestrations	Schmigadoon!	Won	
2026	Tony Award	Best Orchestrations	Schmigadoon!	Won	
