= Daryl Waters =

American composer, arranger, and orchestrator

- Born: Cleveland, Ohio, U.S.
- Genre: Orchestra
- Occupations: Composer, arranger, orchestrator, conductor
- Instrument: Keyboards

Daryl Waters is an American composer, arranger, conductor, and orchestrator who has worked on many shows both on and off-Broadway. He has received numerous Tony Award and Drama Desk Award nominations for orchestration, and won the 2010 Tony Award for Best Orchestrations for Memphis.

== Life and career ==
Waters was born in Cleveland, Ohio and graduated from Livingstone College in Salisbury, North Carolina. He made his Broadway debut as associate conductor on Leader of the Pack in 1985. He was the co-composer of the musical Bring in 'da Noise, Bring in 'da Funk, which earned him a Tony Award and Grammy Award nomination in 1996.

Waters is a member of the American Federation of Musicians and the Dramatists Guild of America. He has collaborated with artists such as Eartha Kitt, Leslie Uggams, Sammy Davis Jr., Jennifer Holliday, Nell Carter and more.

== Stage credits ==
Year	Title	Role	Venue	Ref.
1985	Leader of the Pack	Associate Conductor	Broadway, Ambassador Theatre	
1992	Jelly's Last Jam	Associate Conductor	Broadway, Virginia Theatre	
1996	Bring in 'da Noise, Bring in 'da Funk	Composer, Orchestrator	Broadway, Ambassador Theatre	
1997	Street Corner Symphony	Arranger, Orchestrator	Broadway, Brooks Atkinson Theatre	
2004	Drowning Crow	Composer	Broadway, Biltmore Theatre	
2005	The Color Purple	Dance arrangements	Broadway, Broadway Theatre	
2009	Memphis	Orchestrator	Broadway, Shubert Theatre	
2013	After Midnight	Music Supervisor, Additional arrangements	Broadway, Brooks Atkinson Theatre	
2014	Holler If Ya Hear Me	Arranger, Orchestrator	Broadway, Palace Theatre	
2016	Shuffle Along, or, the Making of the Musical Sensation of 1921 and All That Followed	Arranger, Orchestrator	Broadway, Music Box Theatre	
2018	The Cher Show	Arranger, Orchestrator	Broadway, Neil Simon Theatre	
2023	New York, New York	Orchestrator	Broadway, St. James Theatre	
2024	Water for Elephants	Orchestrator	Broadway, Imperial Theatre	
2024	A Wonderful World: The Louis Armstrong Musical	Additional orchestrations	Broadway, Studio 54	
2025	Gypsy	Additional arrangements, orchestrations	Broadway, Majestic Theatre	
2025	Boop! The Musical	Additional arrangements, Music Director	Broadway, Broadhurst Theatre	
2025	Pirates! The Penzance Musical	Orchestrations	Broadway, Todd Haimes Theatre	

== Awards and nominations ==
Year	Award	Category	Work	Result	Ref.
1996	Tony Awards	Best Original Score	Bring in 'da Noise, Bring in 'da Funk	Nominated	
1996	Grammy Awards	Best Musical Show Album	Bring in 'da Noise, Bring in 'da Funk	Nominated	
2010	Tony Awards	Best Orchestrations	Memphis	Won	
2010	Drama Desk Award	Outstanding Orchestrations	Memphis	Won	
2016	Tony Awards	Best Orchestrations	Shuffle Along	Nominated	
2023	Tony Awards	Best Orchestrations	New York, New York	Nominated	
2023	Drama Desk Award	Outstanding Orchestrations	New York, New York	Nominated	
2023	Outer Critics Circle Award	Outstanding Orchestrations	New York, New York	Nominated	
2019	Drama Desk Award	Outstanding Orchestrations	The Cher Show	Nominated	
