= William David Brohn =

American arranger and orchestrator

William David Brohn (March 30, 1933 – May 11, 2017) was an American arranger and orchestrator, best known for his scores of musicals such as Miss Saigon, Ragtime and Wicked. He won the Tony Award for Best Orchestrations for Ragtime and won the Drama Desk Award for Outstanding Orchestrations three times.

His work was eclectic, orchestrating many different styles of music. His modern scores are known for their keyboard writing for the orchestra pit, and their balance between acoustic and synthesised sounds. Brohn was one of the few theatre orchestrators to use the E-bow attachment to the electric guitar, which can be heard in his orchestrations for Wicked and Mary Poppins.

== Education ==
Born in Flint, Michigan, Brohn later studied Music Theory at Michigan State University, graduating with a Bachelor of Music in 1955. He also studied Composition at the New England Conservatory (1958) and took further education in Tanglewood, Massachusetts and in Salzburg, Austria. He was also mentored by the celebrated arranger Robert Russell Bennett. While a student, he performed on the Contrabass with dance bands, and some of these jazz and pop elements can be seen regularly in his Broadway arrangements.

== Career ==
In the 1960s, Brohn began his career as conductor for the Joffrey Ballet, American Ballet Theatre, and the Royal Ballet's tours of America. He then focused on orchestration during the next two decades, producing ballet scores for Agnes de Mille, Lar Lubovitch, Twyla Tharp, Susan Stroman and the American Ballet Theatre.

In 1989, Brohn began to collaborate with Cameron Mackintosh, orchestrating approximately ten of his shows also working on scores for musicals with Trevor Nunn and the Royal National Theatre, London.

Additionally, Brohn has provided arrangements for Liza Minnelli (the complete orchestrations to her Minnelli on Minnelli tour, 1999–2000) Marilyn Horne, Renée Fleming, Frederica von Stade, Plácido Domingo Judy Collins and Jerry Hadley which have all been recorded. Brohn has also collaborated with conductors such as André Previn, John Williams and Keith Lockhart.

In 1987 Brohn was commissioned to make an adaptation of Prokofiev's film scores Alexander Nevsky and Ivan the Terrible which were later recorded onto CD. A Sony CD of his one-movement Suite from Bernstein's West Side Story for violin and orchestra, featuring Joshua Bell as violin soloist, was released in 2001. He also made arrangements for Sir James Galway on his Sony CD Wind Beneath My Wings. He has provided music for the Boston Pops Orchestra, including various adaptations of Christmas and theatre music, as well as for the Cleveland Orchestra and the Hollywood Bowl.

In 1996 Brohn was awarded an honorary Doctorate in Fine Art from Michigan State University and later presented a master class there entitled "The Future of Musical Theatre" in 2004.

On 4 October 2009, the concert From Broadway to West End: By Special Arrangement was held in Bill's honour at the Theatre Royal Drury Lane in aid of the charity CLIC Sargent. The concert was conducted by his protégé Chris Jahnke and featured songs from Oklahoma!, My Fair Lady, Curtains, Wicked, Sweet Smell of Success, Miss Saigon, Mary Poppins, Ragtime, Oliver!, South Pacific, The Three Musketeers, Crazy for You and Carousel.

== Stage work ==
- 2016 - Half a Sixpence
- 2013 - Barnum
- 2012 - The Gershwins' Porgy and Bess
- 2011 - Betty Blue Eyes
- 2010 - Marguerite (Ostrava, Czech Republic)
- 2009 - First You Dream: The Music of Kander and Ebb
- 2009 - Oliver!
- 2008 - Gone With The Wind
- 2007 - Curtains
- 2006 - Mary Poppins
- 2004 - Show Boat
- 2003 - Wicked
- 2002 - Sweet Smell of Success: The Musical
- 2002 - A Man of No Importance
- 2001 - My Fair Lady
- 2001 - South Pacific
- 2000 - The Witches of Eastwick
- 1998 - O! Freedom (Co-Arranger)
- 1998 - Hey, Mr. Producer (Co-Orchestrator)
- 1998 - High Society
- 1998 - Oklahoma! (Additional Orchestrations)
- 1996 - Ragtime (1998 Tony Award for Best Orchestrations, New York Drama Desk Award)
- 1995 - Martin Guerre
- 1995 - Oliver!
- 1994 - Busker Alley (by the Sherman Brothers)
- 1993 -The Red Shoes
- 1992 - Crazy for You (New York Drama Desk Award nomination)
- 1992 - The Secret Garden (New York Drama Desk Award winner)
- 1992 - Carousel
- 1992 - 110 in the Shade (Additional orchestrations)
- 1989 - Jerome Robbins’ Broadway
- 1989 - Miss Saigon (New York Drama Desk Award winner)
- 1986 - The Boys in Autumn (Incidental music for the Broadway play)
- 1985 - Wind in the Willows
- 1984 - The Three Musketeers (Revival/additional orchestrations)
- 1984 - Gotta Getaway
- 1983 - Marilyn
- 1980 - Brigadoon (Revival)
- 1978 - King of Hearts
- 1978 - Timbuktu!
- 1976 - Rockabye Hamlet (Additional orchestrations)
- 1975 - Rodgers & Hart (Additional orchestrations)

== Filmography ==
- Anastasia
- Endless Love
- Blue Thunder
- War Games
- Whose Life Is It, Anyway?

== See also ==
- List of music arrangers
