= Catherine Brunell =

American actress

- Born: Shrewsbury, Massachusetts, U.S.
- Education: Northwestern University
- Occupation: Actress
- Spouse: Christopher Mark Peterson (m. 2002)
- Website: catherinebrunell.net

Catherine Brunell is an American actress from Shrewsbury, Massachusetts.

She married actor Christopher Mark Peterson on October 20, 2002.

== Acting roles ==
=== Broadway ===
Year	Show	Role	Theater	Ref.
1997-2001	Les Misérables	Eponine	Imperial Theatre	
2002	Thoroughly Modern Millie	Cora, Mathilde, Millie u/s	Marquis Theatre	
2003	Big River	Standby, Understudy	American Airlines Theatre	
2008	A Tale of Two Cities	Ensemble, Lucie u/s	Al Hirschfeld Theatre	
2011	Mary Poppins	Annie, Mary Poppins u/s	New Amsterdam Theatre	
2012-13	Elf	Ensemble, Jovie u/s	Al Hirschfeld Theatre	
2015-16	Something Rotten!	Portia	St. James Theatre	
2019-20	Mean Girls	Mrs. Heron/Ms. Norbury/Mrs. George	August Wilson Theatre	

=== National Tours ===
Year	Show	Role	Ref.
2024	Mrs. Doubtfire	Miranda Hillard	

=== Television ===
Year	Title	Role	Notes
2013	The Sound of Music Live!	Frau Zeller	NBC TV special
2015	Unbreakable Kimmy Schmidt	Jenny	Episode: "Kimmy Rides a Bike!"

== Education ==
- Shrewsbury High School - Shrewsbury, Massachusetts
- Northwestern University - Evanston, Illinois
