= Donald Pippin (Broadway director) =

American theatre director (1926–2022)

Donald Pippin (November 25, 1926 – June 9, 2022) was a Tony and Emmy Award-winning American theatre musical director and orchestral conductor.
