= Night of 100 Stars =

1982 TV programme

- Genre: Variety show
- Written by: Hildy Parks
- Directed by: Clark Jones

Production
- Production location: Radio City Music Hall in Manhattan, New York City

Original release
- Network: ABC
- Release: March 8, 1982

Related
- Night of 100 Stars II (1985)

Night of 100 Stars is an all-star variety television special celebrating the centennial of the Actors' Fund of America, airing in 1982. It won the Emmy Award for Outstanding Variety, Music or Comedy Program at the 34th Primetime Emmy Awards.

== Performers ==
Performer	Song
The Rockettes	"Theme Song"
Tony Bennett, Harry Belafonte, Liza Minnelli	"New York, New York" medley
Doobie Brothers	"Here to Love You"
Christopher Cross	"Arthur's Theme"
Lionel Richie	"Oh No!"
