= Rodgers + Hammerstein's Cinderella (Beane musical) =

Musical by Rodgers, Hammerstein and Beane (2013 adaptation)

- Original Broadway poster (2013)
- Music: Richard Rodgers
- Lyrics: Oscar Hammerstein II
- Book: Oscar Hammerstein II; Douglas Carter Beane
- Basis: Cendrillon by Charles Perrault; Cinderella by Rodgers and Hammerstein
- Premiere: March 3, 2013: The Broadway Theatre, New York City
- Productions: 2013 Broadway; 2014 North American tour 2016 North American tour
- Awards: Tony Award for Best Costume Design in a Musical

Rodgers + Hammerstein's Cinderella is a musical in two acts with music by Richard Rodgers, lyrics by Oscar Hammerstein II, and a book by Douglas Carter Beane based partly on Hammerstein's 1957 television adaptation. The story is derived from the fairy tale Cinderella, particularly the French version Cendrillon ou la petite pantoufle de verre, by Charles Perrault. It concerns a young woman forced into a life of servitude by her cruel stepmother and selfish stepsisters. She dreams of a better life, and with the help of her Fairy Godmother, Cinderella is transformed into an elegant young lady and is able to attend the ball to meet her Prince. In this version, however, she opens the Prince's eyes to injustice in his kingdom.

Rodgers and Hammerstein originally wrote the songs for a 1957 television broadcast starring Julie Andrews, and it was remade twice for television and adapted for the stage in various versions through the decades. The 2013 adaptation was the first version of Cinderella with the Rodgers and Hammerstein score mounted on Broadway. The new book by Beane makes the Prince an orphan and introduces several new characters, including a sinister regent and an idealistic revolutionary, and makes one of the stepsisters sympathetic. The score features several additional Rodgers and Hammerstein songs from their catalog. The production originally starred Laura Osnes in the title role and Santino Fontana as the Prince and ran for 770 performances. It was nominated for nine Tony Awards, winning one, for Best Costume Design. North American tours and international productions followed.

== Background ==
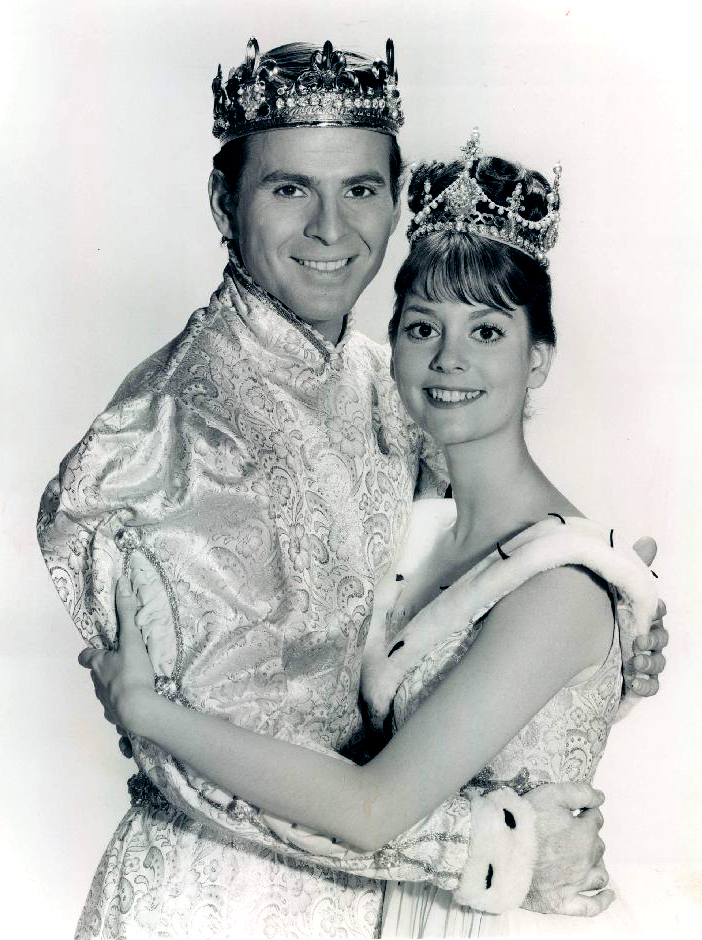
Stuart Damon, as the Prince; Lesley Ann Warren, as Cinderella (1965)

The original 1957 broadcast starred Julie Andrews as Cinderella and Jon Cypher as the Prince. More than 107 million viewers saw the broadcast. Its extraordinary popularity led to consideration of a Broadway adaptation as soon as early 1958, but none materialized. The musical was staged at the London Coliseum in 1958 in a holiday pantomime adaptation that also used songs from Me & Juliet. Stage adaptations began to appear in U.S. theatres by 1961.

After the musical's success in its initial broadcast and as a stage production, and since, in 1957, the original TV version was not able to be filmed for rebroadcast, CBS mounted another production in 1965 with a new script that hewed closer to the traditional tale but retained nearly all of the original music. Lesley Ann Warren played the title role; a scene early in the first act was added in which the Prince meets Cinderella and they admire each other's kindness. Another hit, this was re-broadcast almost annually over the next decade. Stage adaptations continued: New York City Opera produced the musical in 1993 and revived it several times, and a US tour played from 2000 to 2001, stopping at The Theater at Madison Square Garden. Meanwhile, a 1997 television re-make was adapted by Robert L. Freedman. Its racially diverse cast featured Brandy as Cinderella, Whitney Houston as her fairy godmother, Bernadette Peters as her stepmother, and Paolo Montalban as the Prince. A 30-week Asian tour starred Lea Salonga, beginning in 2008, and an all-female production of the musical in Japan in 2008 featured J-Pop group Morning Musume and veteran members of the Takarazuka Revue.

In Douglas Carter Beane's adaptation of the story, Cinderella opens Prince Topher's eyes to injustice in the kingdom. The Prince's parents have died, leaving the kingdom in the hands of a villainous regent, who has been the Prince's mentor and has duped his young charge into approving oppressive acts against the peasants. The rebel Jean-Michel, a new character, and stepsister Gabrielle are in love, and they demand reforms; Cinderella uses some of her moments with the prince to encourage him to listen to Jean-Michel's ideas. The book is expanded to a typical Broadway running time, with new scenes such as a second palace banquet, and, besides the best-known songs from the original version, the score adds several songs from the Rodgers and Hammerstein catalog, including "Me, Who Am I?" (cut from Me & Juliet), "Now Is the Time" and "Loneliness of Evening" (cut from South Pacific; the latter was used in the 1965 version of Cinderella), "He Was Tall" (cut from The King and I), and "There's Music in You" (written for the film Main Street to Broadway and used in the 1997 version). The show was given workshop productions in 2012.

== Productions ==
The musical's first Broadway production began previews on January 25, 2013, and opened on March 3, 2013, at The Broadway Theatre. Mark Brokaw directed the production, with Josh Rhodes choreographing, and the original cast included Laura Osnes in the title role, Santino Fontana as the Prince, Victoria Clark as Crazy Marie/the Fairy Godmother, Harriet Harris as Ella's stepmother, Peter Bartlett as Sebastian, The Prime Minister, Ann Harada and Marla Mindelle as stepsisters Charlotte and Gabrielle, and Greg Hildreth as the rebel Jean-Michel. Designers included Anna Louizos (sets), William Ivey Long (costumes), and Kenneth Posner (lighting). The show's initial reviews were mixed.

Rebecca Luker replaced Clark from September 2013 to January 2014. Carly Rae Jepsen and Fran Drescher were replacements for Ella and the Stepmother, both making their Broadway debuts, from February 2014 to June 2014. Paige Faure stepped into the role of Ella, and Nancy Opel played the Stepmother, from June through September 2014. Keke Palmer, Sherri Shepherd, and Judy Kaye joined the cast as Ella, the Stepmother, and the Fairy Godmother in September 2014. A report in The Guardian commented, regarding Palmer, that "casting an African American actor as such an iconic – and typically pale – character is emblematic of the progress Broadway is making, slowly and haltingly, in employing actors of color in a broader array of parts." On September 23, 2014, Lesley Ann Warren joined the cast during the curtain call to celebrate the coming 50th-anniversary of the 1965 television version. NeNe Leakes replaced Shepherd from November 2014. The production closed on January 3, 2015, after 41 previews and 770 regular performances.

A North American tour began on October 10, 2014, in Providence, Rhode Island, and closed in May 2016. Faure starred as Ella opposite Andy Jones as Topher. Fran Drescher reprised the role of the Stepmother during the tour's engagement in Los Angeles in March and April 2015. The tour recouped its investment after six months. A non-Equity North American tour began on September 27, 2016, in Grand Rapids, Michigan, and closed on April 28, 2019, in Monterrey, Mexico. It was directed by Gina Rattan and choreographed by Lee Wilkins.

A touring production in Australia began at the Regent Theatre, Melbourne, in May 2022, moved to the Lyric Theatre, Brisbane, in August, and opened at the Sydney Lyric Theatre in October 2022; it closed on 29 January 2023. The cast included Shubshri Kandiah as Ella; Ainsley Melham as Prince Topher; Silvie Paladino as Marie; Tina Bursill as Madame, and Todd McKenney as Sebastian. Nicholas Hammond played Sebastian for the musical's engagements in Brisbane and Sydney.

The musical was revived at Hope Mill Theatre in Manchester, England, for a limited run from November 1 through December 11, 2022, with an opening night on November 6. Grace Mouat starred as Ella, with Jacob Fowler as Prince Topher, Annie Aitken as Madame, Julie Yammanee as Marie/Godmother, Lee Ormsby as Sebastian, Matthew McDonald as Lord Pinkleton, Katie Ramshaw as Charlotte, Olivia-Faith Kamau as Gabrielle, and Adam Filipe as Jean-Michel.

A Spanish-language production set in the 1950s ran from October 2, 2025 to June 28, 2026, at the Teatro Coliseum in Madrid. Directed by Anthony Van Laast, the cast included Paule Mallagaray as Ella, Briel González as Topher, Mayca Teba as Marie, Mariola Peña as Madame, María Gago as Gabrielle, Caro Gestoso as Charlotte, José Navar as Sebastian, Eloi Gómez as Jean-Michel, and Jaume Giró as Lord Pinkleton.

== Plot ==
=== Act I ===
Ella, a young woman, lives with her stepmother, Madame, and stepsisters, who have treated her like a servant ever since her father's death. Because she sits by the fireplace and is dirty from the cinders, they ridicule her as "Cinderella". Ella dreams of a better life ("Prologue").

Since the king and queen died when he was young, Prince Topher (short for Christopher) has been advised by Lord Chancellor Sebastian. Though expert at slaying dragons, griffins, gargoyles and giants, he feels uncertain about how he will rule as king ("Me, Who Am I?"); he signs everything Sebastian asks him to. Prince Topher and Ella meet as he is on his way to the palace. She offers him a drink of water, and each admires the other's kindness. Ella then speaks with her friends Jean-Michel, an erstwhile revolutionary, and Crazy Marie, an old woman who lives near the forest and gathers what others throw away. Madame arrives with Ella's stepsisters, the demanding Charlotte and the meek Gabrielle, who has a crush on Jean-Michel that she hides from her mother. Left alone, Ella dreams of a better life ("In My Own Little Corner").

In the palace, Sebastian and his henchman, Lord Pinkleton, remind the Prince that it is time for a Royal Wedding; a masked ball will be held to find him a bride. Jean-Michel yells across the moat that the kingdom's policies are unfair to the Prince's poorer subjects. Pinkleton goes to the town square to announce the ball and finds Jean-Michel rallying the townsfolk to protest the government's taking of peasants' land. The ball proves more exciting to the people than political talk ("The Prince Is Giving a Ball"/"Now Is the Time").

The cottage is a whirl of activity as Madame and stepsisters prepare for the ball. Sebastian plans with Madame to steer the Prince to select Gabrielle as his bride. They leave Ella behind, but Jean-Michel arrives to argue that Prince Topher needs to know more about his people. He teases Ella that she should put on a ball gown and tell Topher about the problems. Crazy Marie jokes with Ella about how life could be better ("In My Own Little Corner" (reprise)). Marie reveals herself to be Ella's Fairy Godmother and transforms a pumpkin and animals into a carriage with a footman and a driver, and Ella's rags into a beautiful gown with Venetian glass slippers ("Impossible"). Warned by her Fairy Godmother that the spell will end at midnight, Ella rides in the carriage to the palace ("It's Possible").

At the ball, the Prince dances with all the young women but finds them lacking ("Gavotte"). Ella arrives in her white ballgown and mask, hiding her identity. She transforms Sebastian's cynical contest of "Ridicule" into one of joy and kindness, fascinating Topher ("Ten Minutes Ago"), and their dance of instant attraction becomes a grand waltz. Ella and the Prince kiss ("Cinderella Waltz"/"Ten Minutes Ago" (reprise)). Too soon, the clock begins to strike midnight. Ella has just enough time to tell the Prince that all is not well in his domain. She races down the steps and loses a shoe but quickly retrieves it and dashes off, leaving the shocked Prince to wonder who she is.

=== Act II ===
The Prince is determined to find the mysterious woman who spoke so honestly about the kingdom. The women of the court, led by stepsister Charlotte, bemoan that the Prince had not chosen any of them to be his love ("Stepsister's Lament"). The Prince and his guards search high and low; almost catching the fleeing Ella ("The Pursuit").

Once again dressed in rags, Ella returns to the cottage and reflects on her wonderful Prince ("He was Tall"). Madame, Charlotte and Gabrielle return in state of dejection. Ella relates what she "imagines" the night at the palace must have been like ("When You're Driving Through the Moonlight"), including dancing with the Prince ("A Lovely Night"). The four have a moment of shared emotion, for once. Left alone with Ella, Gabrielle realizes that Ella was the Prince's partner at the ball. Gabrielle reveals that she is an ally, and also in love with Jean-Michel. They vow to keep their shared secrets ("A Lovely Night" (reprise)).

Prince Topher continues his search ("Loneliness of Evening"), gradually realizing that Sebastian had been leading him down the wrong path. He decides to hold a banquet to find the enigmatic young woman ("Announcing the Banquet"). The night of the feast arrives, and Gabrielle gives Ella her dress and invitation to attend. Jean-Michel arrives at the house to confess his love to Gabrielle. However, Madame catches them and also sees Ella in Gabrielle's gown, which she tears to shreds and banishes Gabrielle and Jean-Michel from the house. Madame takes Charlotte to the banquet. The Fairy Godmother produces perfect attire and helps inspire Ella to another frank talk with the Prince ("There's Music in You"). At the palace, Ella, Jean-Michel and Gabrielle tell the Prince how he could be a great king ("Now Is the Time" (reprise)), and he immediately announces an election for a Prime Minister to be held between Sebastian and Jean-Michel. Topher is ready to be a king and knows the partner he needs in love and life ("Do I Love You Because You're Beautiful"). Suddenly, the clock begins to chime midnight. Ella races down the stairs but pauses and purposely leaves a slipper behind.

The Prince gives all of the women of the kingdom a chance to try on the glass slipper. Everyone is unsuccessful; Marie urges Ella to return to the palace. Of course, the slipper fits her perfectly. Madame apologizes to Ella for her cruelty, and Ella forgives her and Charlotte ("The Shoe Fits"). Topher asks Ella to marry him, and she happily accepts ("The Proposal"). Gabrielle and Jean-Michel reconcile with Madame. Jean-Michel is elected Prime-Minister, Topher and Ella wed, and they all live happily ever after ("The Wedding").

== Musical numbers ==
Unlike the three-act television version, the 2013 Broadway production is performed in two acts with additional songs, including "Me, Who Am I?", "Now Is the Time", "He Was Tall", "Loneliness of Evening" and "There's Music in You".

Act I

- "Overture" – Orchestra
- "Prologue" – Orchestra and Ella
- "Me, Who Am I?" – Topher, Sebastian, Lord Pinkleton, Knights and Pages
- "In My Own Little Corner" – Ella
- "The Prince Is Giving a Ball"/"Now Is the Time" – Sebastian, Jean-Michel, Townspeople, Lord Pinkleton, Madame, Charlotte, Gabrielle, Ella and Marie
- "Cinderella March" – Orchestra
- "In My Own Little Corner" (reprise) – Ella
- "Impossible" – Marie and Ella
- "It's Possible" – Ella and Marie
- "Gavotte" – Sebastian, Topher, Lord Pinkleton, Madame, Charlotte, Gabrielle and Lords & Ladies of the Court
- "Ten Minutes Ago" – Topher and Ella
- "Cinderella Waltz" – Orchestra
- "Ten Minutes Ago" (reprise) – Topher, Ella and Lords & Ladies of the Court

Act II

- "Entr'acte" – Orchestra
- "Stepsister's Lament" – Charlotte and Ladies of the Court
- "The Pursuit" – Topher, Lord Pinkleton, Lords of the Court, Pages, Ella, the Footman and the Driver
- "He Was Tall" – Ella
- "When You're Driving Through the Moonlight" – Ella, Madame, Charlotte and Gabrielle
- "A Lovely Night" – Ella, Madame, Charlotte and Gabrielle
- "A Lovely Night" (reprise) – Ella and Gabrielle
- "Loneliness of Evening" – Topher and Ella
- "Announcing the Banquet" – Sebastian, Lord Pinkleton, Heralds and Madame
- "There's Music in You" – Marie
- "Now Is the Time" (reprise) – Jean-Michel and Gabrielle
- "Do I Love You Because You're Beautiful?" – Topher and Ella
- "The Shoe Fits" – Lord Pinkleton, Topher, Ella and Company
- "The Proposal" – Topher, Ella and Company
- "The Wedding" – Marie and Company

== Notable casts ==
Characters	Broadway	North American tour	North American tour
Characters	2013	2014	2016
Ella	Laura Osnes	Paige Faure	Tatyana Lubov
Topher	Santino Fontana	Andy Jones	Hayden Stanes
Marie	Victoria Clark	Kecia Lewis	Leslie Jackson
Madame	Harriet Harris	Beth Glover	Sarah Primmer
Gabrielle	Marla Mindelle	Ashley Park	Mimi Robinson
Charlotte	Ann Harada	Aymee Garcia	Joanna Johnson
Sebastian	Peter Bartlett	Blake Hammond	Ryan M. Hunt
Jean-Michel	Greg Hildreth	David Andino	Chris Woods
Lord Pinkleton	Phumzile Sojola	Antoine L. Smith	Vincent Davis

=== Notable Broadway replacements ===
- Ella: Carly Rae Jepsen, Keke Palmer
- Marie: Judy Kaye, Rebecca Luker
- Madame: Fran Drescher, NeNe Leakes, Sherri Shepherd, Nancy Opel

== Reception ==
Ben Brantley of The New York Times called the production a "glittery patchwork of a show" that "wants to be reassuringly old-fashioned and refreshingly irreverent, sentimental and snarky, sincere and ironic, all at once." Brantley added that the show "doesn't seem to know quite what" it wants to be. The Financial Times praised the cast, especially Osnes, the costumes and the choreography and opined that "the production is an absolute joy, marred only by occasional slowness of pace." Richard Zoglin, writing for Time magazine, noted that the new production is "brightly colored, high spirited and well sung", but comparing it with the "emotionally alive" 1957 broadcast, he found the original stepsisters to be "more credible and less cartoonish than their present-day equivalents" and thought that the Prince and Cinderella "make a dreamier pair – you actually can believe they are falling in love. ... The new Broadway version, for all its hip updating, is a much less adventurous project." A reviewer from the Chicago Tribune wrote:

The fundamental problem with ... Beane's perplexing, wholly unromantic and mostly laugh-free new book ... – which turns the heroine into a social reformer ... the stepsisters ... into sympathetic, wounded creatures of thwarted desire, and Prince Charming ... into a myopic dunce who needs his eyes opened to the poverty of his people – is that it denies the audience the pleasure of instant reversals of fortune. ... This new version ends up collapsing the basic logic of the familiar story and tramples all over the musical soul of a score from another era.

On the other hand, an Associated Press review praised Beane's script and wrote that it "crackles with sweetness and freshness, combining a little Monty Python's Spamalot with some Les Misérables. It also found the cast "first-rate" and the overall story "quirky, yet heart filled". The reviewer from USA Today also liked the production, commenting:

Osnes and a gifted supporting cast make this fairy tale very much their own – a scrumptious trifle that, for all its hokey moments, will charm theatergoers of all ages. Beane['s] Cinderella is not merely a kind maiden in distress, but a curious young woman becoming aware of injustices beyond her own shabby treatment. ... If the twist sounds a bit like a post-feminist contrivance, Beane keeps things sufficiently light and whimsical; the satire may verge on dopey at times, but it's never pretentious. And Brokaw elicits breezy, witty performances from his players, who could hardly be better suited to their roles. ... The visual effects are ... more dazzling than the score.

== Cast album ==
An original Broadway cast recording of the production was issued by Ghostlight Records in 2013. The album features arrangements of the score by David Chase and was conducted by Andy Einhorn. Orchestrations are by Danny Troob.

== Awards and nominations ==
The musical was nominated for nine Tony Awards, winning only one for William Ivey Long's costume design. It received five Drama Desk Award nominations, winning three, for Outstanding Orchestrations, Costume Design and, for Osnes, Outstanding Actress in a Musical. It was also nominated for two Drama League Awards but did not win either, and for eight Outer Critics Circle Awards, winning one for costume design.

=== Original Broadway production ===
Year	Award	Category	Nominee	Result
2013	Tony Award	Best Revival of a Musical		Nominated
2013	Tony Award	Best Book of a Musical	Douglas Carter Beane	Nominated
2013	Tony Award	Best Performance by a Leading Actor in a Musical	Santino Fontana	Nominated
2013	Tony Award	Best Performance by a Leading Actress in a Musical	Laura Osnes	Nominated
2013	Tony Award	Best Performance by a Featured Actress in a Musical	Victoria Clark	Nominated
2013	Tony Award	Best Costume Design	William Ivey Long	Won
2013	Tony Award	Best Lighting Design	Kenneth Posner	Nominated
2013	Tony Award	Best Sound Design	Nevin Steinberg	Nominated
2013	Tony Award	Best Orchestrations	Danny Troob	Nominated
2013	Drama Desk Award	Outstanding Revival of a Musical		Nominated
2013	Drama Desk Award	Outstanding Actress in a Musical	Laura Osnes	Won
2013	Drama Desk Award	Outstanding Choreography	Josh Rhodes	Nominated
2013	Drama Desk Award	Outstanding Costume Design	William Ivey Long	Won
2013	Drama Desk Award	Outstanding Orchestrations	Danny Troob	Won
2013	Drama League Award	Outstanding Revival of a Broadway or Off-Broadway Musical		Nominated
2013	Drama League Award	Distinguished Performance Award	Laura Osnes	Nominated
2013	Outer Critics Circle Award	Outstanding Revival of a Musical (Broadway or Off-Broadway)		Nominated
2013	Outer Critics Circle Award	Outstanding Book of a Musical (Broadway or Off-Broadway)	Douglas Carter Beane	Nominated
2013	Outer Critics Circle Award	Outstanding Actor in a Musical	Santino Fontana	Nominated
2013	Outer Critics Circle Award	Outstanding Actress in a Musical	Laura Osnes	Nominated
2013	Outer Critics Circle Award	Outstanding Featured Actress in a Musical	Victoria Clark	Nominated
2013	Outer Critics Circle Award	Outstanding Choreographer	Josh Rhodes	Nominated
2013	Outer Critics Circle Award	Outstanding Costume Design (Play or Musical)	William Ivey Long	Won
2013	Outer Critics Circle Award	Outstanding Lighting Design (Play or Musical)	Kenneth Posner	Nominated
