= Danny Troob =

American arranger and orchestrator (born 1949)

Daniel Troob (born February 28, 1949, in Forest Hills, New York) is an American arranger and orchestrator best known for his contributions to the Disney blockbusters of the 1990s & 2000s. He won Drama Desk awards for Big River (1985) and Rodgers & Hammersteins' "Cinderella" (2013).

Troob made his debut at Carnegie Hall at age 12 with an orchestral work orchestrated by himself and conducted by Leopold Stokowski. It was the first time he attended a concert at Carnegie Hall. He graduated from Forest Hills High School, Class of '66 and graduated with Honors in Music Composition at Harvard University in 1970.

Troob's most popular Disney feature film credits include Beauty and the Beast, Aladdin, Newsies, The Lion King, Pocahontas, Hercules, Enchanted and Tangled.

His Broadway credits start with dance music to Pacific Overtures (1976), Baker's Wife (1977), and orchestrations include How to Succeed in Business Without Really Trying with Matthew Broderick (1996), The Pajama Game (2006) with Harry Connick, Jr., as well as the Disney movie musical adaptions and Shrek The Musical (2008) for Broadway.

He was nominated for an Annie Award in 2001 for Outstanding Individual Achievement for Musical Score for an Animated Feature Production for The Little Mermaid II: Return to the Sea.

He currently lives in New York City.

== Stage work ==
Year	Production	Role	Notes
2021	Beauty and the Beast (musical)	Orchestrator	
2015	69th Tony Awards	Orchestrator	
2015	Doctor Zhivago (musical)	Orchestrator	
2014	Aladdin (2011 musical)	Orchestrator	
2013	Rodgers + Hammerstein's Cinderella	Orchestrator	
2012	66th Tony Awards	Orchestrator	
2011	Newsies	Orchestrator	
2010	The Addams Family	Orchestrator	Additional orchestrations
2009	The 101 Dalmatians Musical	Orchestrator	
2009	63rd Tony Awards	Orchestrator	
2008	Shrek the Musical	Orchestrator	
2008	Gypsy	Orchestrator	Revival; special keyboard arrangements
2008	The Little Mermaid	Orchestrator	
2006	The Pajama Game	Orchestrator	
2005	Chita Rivera: The Dancer's Life	Orchestrator	Revue
2003	Little Shop of Horrors	Orchestrator	
1998	Footloose	Orchestrator	
1997	King David	Orchestrator	Additional orchestrations
1995	How to Succeed in Business Without Really Trying	Orchestrator	Revival
1994	Beauty and the Beast	Orchestrator	
1992	My Favorite Year	Orchestrator	Orchestration for "Manhattan"
1988	Legs Diamond	Orchestrator	Additional orchestrations
1988	Romance/Romance	Orchestrator	Additional orchestrations
1985	Big River	Orchestrator	Orchestrated and music supervised
1984	The Three Musketeers	Orchestrator	Revival; additional orchestrations
1981	Bring Back Birdie	Orchestrator	Music and dance arrangements
1980	Happy New Year	Orchestrator	Additional orchestrations
1979	Saravá	Orchestrator	
1977	Side by Side by Sondheim	Orchestrator	Revue
1976	Pacific Overtures	Orchestrator	Dance music
1975	Goodtime Charley	Orchestrator	Dance arrangements

== Filmography ==
Year	Title	Role/Notes
2024	Spellbound	additional song orchestrator
2018	Mary Poppins Returns	additional orchestrations
2010	Tangled	additional orchestrations
2009	The 63rd Annual Tony Awards (TV special)	orchestrator
2007	Enchanted	orchestrator, all songs and animated score
2005	Once Upon a Mattress (TV movie)	lead orchestrator
2005	The Producers	additional orchestrator: score
2004	Noel	conductor, music arranger, orchestrator
2004	Home on the Range	additional orchestrator
2001	South Pacific (TV movie)	song orchestrator
2001	Lady and the Tramp II: Scamp's Adventure (video)	conductor: score, orchestrator
2000	The Little Mermaid 2: Return to the Sea (video)	conductor: score, orchestrator: score
2000	Geppetto (TV movie)	song orchestrator
1999	Annie (TV movie)	musical underscore, orchestrator
1998	Cousin Bette	music adaptor, music arranger: songs, musician: piano, orchestrator
1997	Cinderella (TV movie)	composer: additional music, music adaptor, music arranger: songs
1997	Hercules	music arranger, orchestrator
1996	The Hunchback of Notre Dame	additional score orchestrator
1995	Pocahontas	conductor: score, music arranger: songs, orchestrator
1995	A Goofy Movie	arranger & orchestrator: "After Today"
1994	The Lion King	additional arrangement: song
1993	Last Action Hero	orchestrator
1992	Aladdin	orchestrations: song and score, songs arranged by
1992	Newsies	music arranger: vocal arrangements, songs orchestrated & conducted
1992	Home Alone 2: Lost in New York	arranger: "My Christmas Tree"
1992	Shining Through	orchestrator
1991	Beauty and the Beast	orchestrator, songs arranger

== Film composer ==
Year	Title	Notes
2001	Lady and the Tramp II: Scamp's Adventure	Film
2000	The Little Mermaid 2: Return to the Sea	Film
1998	Cousin Bette	music and lyrics for multiple songs; performer of several cues
1997	Boys Life 2	(segment "Trevor")
1997	Cinderella	TV Movie, music: "Transformation"
1994	Trevor	Short film

== Awards and nominations ==
Year	Award	Category	Work	Result
1985	Drama Desk Award	Outstanding Orchestrations	Big River	Won
1994	Drama Desk Award	Outstanding Orchestrations	Beauty and the Beast	Nominated
2006	Tony Award	Best Orchestrations	The Pajama Game	Nominated
2006	Drama Desk Award	Outstanding Orchestrations	The Pajama Game	Nominated
2009	Tony Award	Best Orchestrations	Shrek The Musical	Nominated
2009	Drama Desk Award	Outstanding Orchestrations	Shrek The Musical	Nominated
2012	Tony Award	Best Orchestrations	Newsies	Nominated
2012	Drama Desk Award	Outstanding Orchestrations	Newsies	Nominated
2013	Tony Award	Best Orchestrations	Rodgers and Hammerstein's Cinderella	Nominated
2013	Drama Desk Award	Outstanding Orchestrations	Rodgers and Hammerstein's Cinderella	Won
2020	Drama Desk Award	Outstanding Orchestrations	Soft Power	Nominated
