= Michael Starobin =

American music arranger

Michael Starobin (born January 25, 1956) is an American orchestrator, conductor, composer, arranger, and musical director, primarily for the stage, film and television. He won Tony Awards for the orchestrations of Assassins (2004) and Next to Normal (2009 with Tom Kitt).

== Career ==
The first Broadway musical that Starobin provided the orchestrations for was Sunday in the Park with George in 1984, for which he won the 1984 Drama Desk Award for Outstanding Orchestration. He has provided the orchestrations for 21 Broadway musicals, 2 special concerts, including the benefit concert of Sunday in the Park with George, and was the musical director for The Mystery of Edwin Drood (1985).

He has also provided orchestrations, or been the musical director, for many Off-Broadway musicals. He wrote the orchestrations for several works by Lynn Ahrens and Stephen Flaherty, such as Once on This Island (1990), as well as William Finn, including In Trousers (1985), Falsettoland (1990) (musical director), and The 25th Annual Putnam County Spelling Bee (2005).

He did the orchestrations for Next to Normal (2009), for which he won the Tony Award for Best Orchestrations (with Tom Kitt).

Starobin provided orchestrations for the television movie musicals Once Upon a Mattress (2005) and A Christmas Carol (2004), among others.

He has been collaborating with Mary Testa as her musical director, in performances and recordings. He plays piano and a little tuba.

== Work (selected) ==
Sources: Playbill; Lortel.org

Stage

- Sunday in the Park with George (1984) - Drama Desk Award Outstanding Orchestrations (winner), Pulitzer Prize
- La Boheme, Public Theatre, (1984) - 1985 Drama Desk Award Outstanding Orchestration (nominee)
- 3 Guys Naked From the Waist Down (1985) - 1985 Drama Desk Award Outstanding Orchestration (nominee)
- The Mystery of Edwin Drood (1985, music director) (Tony Award: Best Musical)
- Rags (1986) - Drama Desk Award Outstanding Orchestration (nominee)
- Birds of Paradise (1987) - Drama Desk Award Outstanding Orchestration (nominee)
- The Knife (1987, Music Direction)
- Romance, Romance (1988)
- Annie 2 (D.C., 1988)
- Legs Diamond (1988)
- Carrie (1988)
- Once On This Island (1990)
- Guys & Dolls (1992) (Tony Award: Best Musical)
- Falsettos (1992) (Tony Award: Best Score)
- My Favorite Year (1992) - Drama Desk Award Outstanding Orchestrations (nominee)
- Hello Again (1994)
- A Christmas Carol (1994–2001, Madison Square Garden)
- A New Brain (1999) - Drama Desk Award Outstanding Orchestrations (nominee)
- Ringling Bros. and Barnum & Bailey Circus (1999, 2000, 2003, 2005, Composer) - original score and songs with Glenn Slater
- The Adventures of Tom Sawyer (2001) - Drama Desk Award Outstanding Orchestrations (nominee)
- Assassins - Tony Award Best Orchestrations (winner); Drama Desk Award Outstanding Orchestrations (nominee)
- The 25th Annual Putnam County Spelling Bee (2005)
- How The Grinch Stole Christmas (2006–)
- The House of Bernarda Alba (LCT, 2006)
- The Glorious Ones (2007) - Drama Desk Award Outstanding Orchestrations (nominee)
- Next to Normal (2009) - Tony Award Best Orchestrations (winner), Drama Desk Award Outstanding Orchestrations (winner), Pulitzer Prize
- Sondheim on Sondheim (2010)
- Queen of the Mist (Transport Group, 2011), Drama Desk Award Outstanding Orchestration (nominee)
- The People in the Picture (2011)
- Leap of Faith (2012)
- Dogfight (Second Stage, 2012)
- Annie (2012)
- If/Then (2014) - Drama Desk Award Outstanding Orchestrations (nominee)
- First Daughter Suite (2015)
- Charlie and the Chocolate Factory (2017)
- Once on This Island (2018) (Revival) - Tony Award Best Orchestrations (nominee)
- Flying Over Sunset (2021)
- Suffs (2024) - Drama Desk Award Outstanding Orchestrations (nominee)
- All the World's a Stage (2025) - Drama Desk Award Outstanding Orchestrations (nominee)

Television

- Cinderella (1997), song arranger
- Beauty and the Beast: The Enchanted Christmas (1997), additional orchestrator
- South Pacific (2001) song orchestrator
- Smash (2013) orchestrator for the song "A Letter from Cecile"
- Galavant (2015–2016) orchestrator

Film

- The Little Mermaid (1989), additional orchestrator
- Beauty and the Beast (1991), additional orchestrator
- Aladdin (1992), additional orchestrator
- Pocahontas (1995), additional orchestrator
- The Hunchback of Notre Dame (1996), score and songs orchestrator, conductor
- Hercules (1997), additional orchestrator
- Chicago (2002), additional orchestrator
- Home on the Range (2004), score and songs orchestrator
- Tangled (2010), songs orchestrator
