= Ralph Burns =

American jazz pianist and composer (1922–2001)

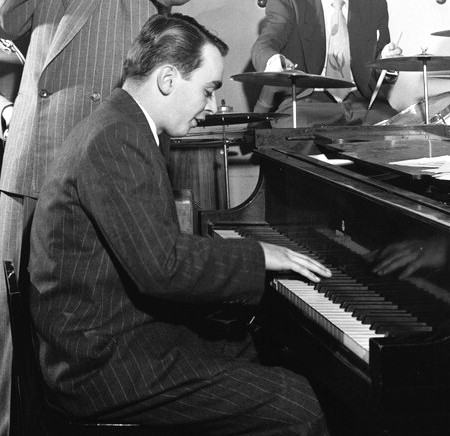
- Performing at the Three Deuces, New York, April 1947

Background information
- Born: Ralph Joseph P. Burns; June 29, 1922; Newton, Massachusetts, U.S.
- Died: November 21, 2001 (aged 79) Los Angeles, California, U.S.
- Genres: Jazz
- Occupations: Musician, composer, arranger
- Instrument: Piano
- Years active: 1939–1993
- Labels: Decca, Norgran, Verve
- Formerly of: Woody Herman, Bob Fosse

Ralph Joseph P. Burns (June 29, 1922 – November 21, 2001) was an American jazz pianist, composer, and arranger.

== Early life ==
Burns was born in Newton, Massachusetts, where he began playing the piano as a child. In 1938, he attended the New England Conservatory of Music. He admitted that he learned the most about jazz by transcribing the works of Count Basie, Benny Goodman and Duke Ellington. While a student, Burns lived in the home of Frances Wayne. Wayne was an established big band singer and her brother Nick Jerret was a bandleader who began working with Burns. He found himself in the company of such performers as Nat King Cole and Art Tatum.

== Career ==
After Burns moved to New York in the early 1940s, he met Charlie Barnet and the two men began working together. In 1944, he joined the Woody Herman band with members Neal Hefti, Bill Harris, Flip Phillips, Chubby Jackson and Dave Tough. Together, the group developed Herman's sound. For 15 years, Burns wrote or arranged many of the band's major hits including "Bijou", "Northwest Passage" and "Apple Honey", and on the longer work "Lady McGowan's Dream" and the three-part Summer Sequence.

Burns worked with many other musicians. Herman band member Stan Getz was featured as a tenor saxophone soloist on "Early Autumn", a hit for the band and the launching platform for Getz's solo career. Burns also worked in a small band with soloists including Bill Harris and Charlie Ventura.

The success of the Herman band provided Burns the ability to record under his own name. In the 1950s, Burns played nightly from 5pm -9pm in The Baroque Room at Oscar's Delmonico restaurant in Downtown Manhattan. He collaborated with Billy Strayhorn, Lee Konitz and Ben Webster to create both jazz and classical recordings. He wrote compositions for Tony Bennett and Johnny Mathis and later Aretha Franklin and Natalie Cole. Burns was responsible for the arrangement and introduction of a string orchestra on two of Ray Charles's biggest hits, "Come Rain or Come Shine" and "Georgia on My Mind". In the 1990s, Burns arranged music for Mel Tormé, John Pizzarelli, Michael Feinstein and Tony Bennett.

In the 1960s, Burns was no longer touring as a band pianist, and began arranging/orchestrating for Broadway shows including Chicago, Funny Girl, No, No, Nanette, and Sweet Charity. In 1971, Burns first film score assignment was for Woody Allen's Bananas. Burns worked with film-director Bob Fosse and won the Academy Award as music supervisor for Cabaret (1972). He composed the film scores for Lenny (1974) and Martin Scorsese's jazz-themed New York, New York (1977). Fosse again employed Burns to create the soundtrack for All That Jazz (1979) for which he also won an Academy Award. He then worked on Urban Cowboy (1980) and My Favorite Year (1982). Burns received another Academy Award nomination for his work in Annie (1982).

Baryshnikov on Broadway in 1980 earned Burns an Emmy for his work. Burns won the Tony Award for Best Orchestrations in 1999 for Fosse and posthumously in 2002 for Thoroughly Modern Millie, which also garnered him the Drama Desk Award for Outstanding Orchestrations. The latter were won with Doug Besterman. From 1996 until his death, Burns restored many orchestrations for New York City Center's Encores! series—revivals of both his own shows and shows originally orchestrated by others. Burns was inducted into the New England Jazz Hall of Fame in 2004.

== Personal life and death ==
Burns was gay, and carefully hid his homosexuality throughout his life.

On November 21, 2001, Burns died from complications of a recent stroke and pneumonia. He was 79 years old.

Burns was buried on April 13, 2002, in his hometown of Newton. He was survived by one sister, Nancy Lane (Burns), and three brothers, Leo, Joe, and Gael.

== Filmography ==
=== Composer ===
- Rhapsody in Wood (with Woody Herman, 1947)
- Lenny (1974)
- Piaf (1974)
- Lucky Lady (1975)
- Movie Movie (1978)
- All That Jazz (1979)
- Make Me an Offer (TV, 1980)
- Urban Cowboy (1980)
- Golden Gate (TV, 1981)
- Pennies from Heaven (1981)
- Side Show (TV, 1981)
- Kiss Me Goodbye (1982)
- Lights, Camera, Annie! (TV, 1982)
- My Favorite Year (1982)
- The Phantom of the Opera (TV, 1983)
- Star 80 (1983)
- National Lampoon's Vacation (1983)
- Ernie Kovacs: Between the Laughter (TV, 1984)
- The Muppets Take Manhattan (1984)
- Moving Violations (1985)
- Perfect (1985)
- The Christmas Star (TV, 1986)
- Penalty Phase (TV, 1986)
- Amazing Stories (2 episodes, 1986–1987)
1. "Magic Saturday" (TV Episode, 1986)
2. "The 21-Inch Sun" (TV Episode, 1987)
- After the Promise (TV, 1987)
- In the Mood (1987)
- All Dogs Go to Heaven (1989)
- Sweet Bird of Youth (TV, 1989)
- Bert Rigby, You're a Fool (1989)

=== Other ===
- Winter Sequence (arrangements, 1954)
- Something More! (orchestrator, 1964)
- Sweet Charity (orchestrator, 1969)
- Move (orchestrator, 1970)
- Bananas (orchestrator, 1971)
- Pippin (orchestrator, 1971)
- Cabaret (conductor, arranger, supervisor, 1972)
- Lenny (music supervisor, 1974)
- Mame (musical director, orchestrator, 1974)
- New York, New York (conductor, supervisor, 1977)
- The World's Greatest Lover (orchestrator, 1977)
- High Anxiety (orchestrator, 1977)
- All That Jazz (conductor, arranger, supervisor, all uncredited, 1979)
- Baryshnikov on Broadway (music arranger, TV, 1980)
- Urban Cowboy (music adaptor, 1980)
- First Family (composer: additional music, uncredited, conductor, adaptor, 1980)
- Bring Back Birdie (orchestrator supervisor, 1981)
- Pippin: His Life and Times (music arranger, TV, 1981)
- History of the World: Part I (orchestrator: "The Spanish Inquisition", 1981)
- Annie (conductor, arranger, 1982)
- Jinxed! (reunion scene arranger and orchestrator, 1982)
- To Be or Not to Be (orchestrator, 1983)
- A Chorus Line (conductor, arranger, 1985)
- In the Mood (conductor, orchestrator, 1987)
- The Josephine Baker Story (TV, 1991)
- Life Stinks (dance orchestrator, 1991)
- The Addams Family (additional orchestrator, 1991)
- Fosse (orchestrator, TV, 2001)

=== Soundtracks ===
- Midnight in the Garden of Good and Evil (writer: "Early Autumn", 1997)
- Star 80 (music: "Overkill", "Off Ramp", "Improvise", "Funky"; lyrics: "Overkill", "Funky", 1983)

== Awards and nominations ==
Year	Award	Category	Work	Result
1973	Academy Awards	Best Scoring Original Song Score and/or Adaptation	Cabaret	Won
1979	Los Angeles Film Critics Association	Best Film	Movie Movie	3rd place
1980	Academy Awards	Best Original Song Score and Its Adaptation or Best Adaptation Score	All That Jazz	Won
1980	Primetime Emmy Award	Outstanding Music Direction	Baryshnikov on Broadway	Won
1980	David di Donatello	Best Foreign Music	Movie Movie	Won
1980	Stinkers Bad Movie Awards	Most Intrusive Musical Score	First Family	Nominated
1983	Academy Awards	Best Original Song Score and Its Adaptation or Best Adaptation Score	Annie	Nominated
1985	Saturn Award	Best Music	The Muppets Take Manhattan	Nominated
1986	Drama Desk Award	Outstanding Orchestrations	Sweet Charity	Nominated
1987	Primetime Emmy Award	Outstanding Music Direction	Liberty Weekend	Nominated
1991	Primetime Emmy Award	Outstanding Music Direction	The Josephine Baker Story	Nominated
1999	Tony Award	Best Orchestrations	Fosse	Won
2002	Tony Award	Best Orchestrations	Thoroughly Modern Millie	Won
2002	Drama Desk Award	Outstanding Orchestrations	Thoroughly Modern Millie	Won

== See also ==
- List of jazz arrangers
