= Evita (musical) =

1978 musical by Lloyd Webber and Rice

- Programme from the original West End Production at the Prince Edward Theatre
- Music: Andrew Lloyd Webber
- Lyrics: Tim Rice
- Book: Tim Rice
- Basis: The life of Eva Perón
- Premiere: 21 June 1978: Prince Edward Theatre, London
- Productions: 1978 West End; 1979 Broadway; 2006 West End revival; 2012 Broadway revival; 2014 West End revival; 2017 West End revival; 2025 West End revival
- Awards: Laurence Olivier Award for Best New Musical; Tony Award for Best Musical; Tony Award for Best Book of a Musical; Tony Award for Best Original Score

Evita is a sung-through musical with music by Andrew Lloyd Webber and lyrics by Tim Rice. It covers the early life, rise to power, charity work, controversies and death of the Argentine political leader Eva Perón, the second wife of the Argentine president Juan Perón.

The musical began as a rock opera concept album released in 1976. Its success led to productions in London's West End in 1978, winning the Laurence Olivier Award for Best Musical, and on Broadway a year later, where it was the first British musical to receive the Tony Award for Best Musical.

This has been followed by a string of professional tours and worldwide productions and numerous cast albums, as well as a 1996 film adaptation. The musical was revived in London's West End in 2006, 2014, 2017, and 2025, and on Broadway in 2012, with a second revival scheduled for 2027.

== Synopsis ==
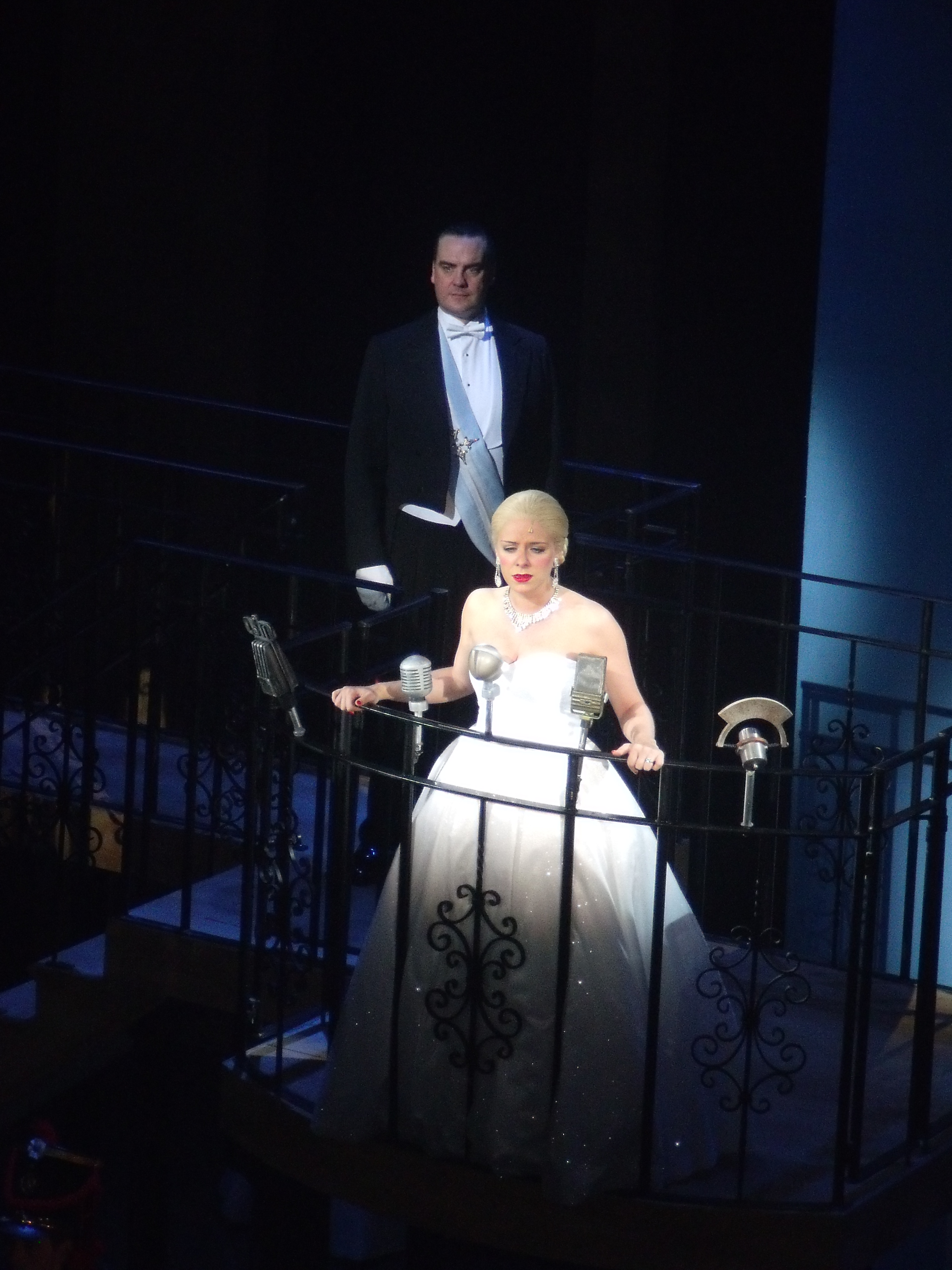
Abigail Jaye as Evita (Gaiety Theatre, Dublin, in 2010)

Act I

On 26 July 1952, a crowd in a Buenos Aires, Argentina theatre is watching a movie ("A Cinema in Buenos Aires, 26 July 1952") that is interrupted when news breaks of the death of First Lady Eva Perón. Both the crowd and the nation go into a period of public mourning ("Requiem for Evita") as Che, a member of the public, marvels at the spectacle and promises to show how Eva did "nothing for years" ("Oh What a Circus").

In 1934, 15-year-old Eva Duarte lives in the city of Junín, and longs to seek a better life in Buenos Aires. Eva takes up with a tango singer-songwriter, Agustín Magaldi, after she meets him at one of his shows ("On This Night of a Thousand Stars"). Eva persuades an initially resistant Magaldi to take her with him to Buenos Aires ("Eva, Beware of the City"). Upon her arrival in the city, Eva sings about her hopes and ambitions of glory ("Buenos Aires").

After her arrival, Eva is quick to leave Magaldi and pursue other romantic connections to climb up the social ladder ("Goodnight and Thank You"). Che tells of both a coup in 1943 and Eva's success, implying that Argentine politics and Eva's career may soon coincide. Che also makes a point to introduce the figure of Colonel Juan Domingo Perón, an ambitious army colonel making his way up the Argentine political ladder ("The Lady's Got Potential"). Perón and other military figures compete for power and exhibit their political strategy, with Perón rising above the pack ("The Art of the Possible").

After a massive earthquake hits the town of San Juan, Perón organizes a charity concert at Luna Park to provide aid to the earthquake's victims, which Eva attends. Perón's rousing speech is well-received by the crowd ("Charity Concert"). Eva introduces herself to Perón and they share a secret rendezvous following the charity concert, where Eva hints that she could help Perón rise to power ("I'd Be Surprisingly Good For You"). Eva dismisses Perón's unnamed mistress, who ponders the rejection and her fate ("Another Suitcase in Another Hall").

Upon moving in with Perón, Eva is introduced to high society only to be met with disdain from the upper classes and the Argentine Army ("Perón's Latest Flame"). In 1946, after launching his presidential bid, Perón discusses his chances of winning the election with Eva. After reassuring him of their chances of winning, Eva organizes rallies for the descamisados (shirtless ones) and gives them hope for a better future while Perón and his allies plot to dispose of anyone who stands in their way ("A New Argentina").

Act II

Perón is elected President in a sweeping victory in 1946. He stands "On The Balcony of the Casa Rosada" addressing his descamisados. Eva speaks from the balcony of the Presidential Palace to her adoring supporters, where she proclaims that despite her elevated status, her heart remains with the people of her country ("Don't Cry for Me Argentina"). Che analyses the price of fame as Eva dances at the Inaugural Ball with Perón, now the president-elect ("High Flying, Adored").

Eva insists on a glamorous image to impress the people of Argentina and promote Peronism. She prepares to tour Europe as she is dressed for success by her fashion consultants ("Rainbow High"). Her famous 1947 tour meets with mixed results ("Rainbow Tour"); Spaniards adore her, but the Italians liken her husband to Benito Mussolini. France is impressed, and the British snub her by inviting her to a country estate, rather than Buckingham Palace. Eva affirms her disdain for the upper class, while Che asks her to start helping those in need as she made a promise ("The Actress Hasn't Learned the Lines (You'd Like to Hear)"). Eva begins the Eva Perón Foundation to direct her charity work. Che describes Eva's controversial charitable work and possible money laundering ("And the Money Kept Rolling In (And Out)").

Eva appears at a church to take the sacrament in front of her adoring supporters ("Santa Evita"), but passes out suddenly, and while unconscious, appears to have a dream that reflects upon the conflicting views of her life. In her dream, she and Che heatedly debate her actions; Che accuses Eva of using the Argentine people for her own ends, while Eva cynically replies that there is no glory in trying to solve the world's problems from the sidelines ("Waltz for Eva and Che"). At the end of the argument, Eva finally admits to herself and Che that she is dying and cannot go on for much longer. Che points out the disastrous results of Perón's policies on Argentina: its treasury is bankrupt, its once-thriving beef industry is under rationing, and the press and other critics of the regime are muzzled.

Perón's generals finally get sick of Eva's meddling and demand that Perón force her to leave politics. However, Perón objects and claims that if it were not for her, they would never have achieved as much as they have ("She Is a Diamond"). But he also concedes that she will not be able to keep working for long as she will soon succumb to her cancer. Even so, Eva is determined to run for Vice President, and Perón fears that the military will stage a coup if she runs and that Eva's health is too delicate for any stressful work, but Eva insists that she can continue, despite her failing health ("Dice Are Rolling/Eva's Sonnet").

Realizing she is about to die, Eva renounces her pursuit of the vice presidency and swears her eternal love to the people of Argentina ("Eva's Final Broadcast"). Eva's numerous achievements flash before her eyes before she dies ("Montage"), and she asks for forgiveness, contemplating her choice of fame instead of long reign ("Lament"). Evita dies, and embalmers preserve her body forever. Che notes a monument was set to be built for Evita but says "only the pedestal was completed, and Evita's body disappeared for 17 years."

== Character roles ==
- Eva Perón (mezzo-soprano): Lead. Playing age 15–33
- Che (tenor): Lead. Playing age 21–35
- Juan Perón (baritone): Supporting. Playing age 40–65
- Agustín Magaldi (tenor): Supporting. Playing age 23–35
- Perón's Mistress (mezzo-soprano): Supporting. Playing age 15-21
- Chorus (men, women and children of Argentina)

== Notable casts ==
| Role | Concept album | West End | Broadway | West End revival | Broadway revival | West End revival | West End revival | West End revival |
| Role | 1976 | 1978 | 1979 | 2006 | 2012 | 2014 | 2017 | 2025 |
|---|---|---|---|---|---|---|---|---|
| Eva Perón | Julie Covington | Elaine Paige | Patti LuPone | Elena Roger | Elena Roger | Madalena Alberto | Emma Hatton | Rachel Zegler |
| Che | Colm Wilkinson | David Essex | Mandy Patinkin | Matt Rawle | Ricky Martin | Marti Pellow | Gian Marco Schiaretti | Diego Andres Rodriguez |
| Juan Perón | Paul Jones | Joss Ackland | Bob Gunton | Philip Quast | Michael Cerveris | Matthew Cammelle | Kevin Stephen-Jones | James Olivas |
| Agustín Magaldi | Tony Christie | Mark Ryan | Mark Syers | Gary Milner | Max von Essen | Ben Forster | Oscar Balmaseda | Aaron Lee Lambert |
| Perón's Mistress | Barbara Dickson | Siobhán McCarthy | Jane Ohringer | Lorna Want | Rachel Potter | Sarah McNicholas | Sarah O'Connor | Bella Brown |

=== Notable replacements ===
==== West End (1978–99) ====
- Eva Perón: Marti Webb, Stephanie Lawrence, Siobhán McCarthy, Kathryn Evans
- Che: Gary Bond, Mark Ryan, Martin Smith
- Juan Perón: John Turner, Oz Clarke, Daniel Benzali
- Agustín Magaldi: David Burt
- Mistress: Kelly Hunter

==== Broadway (1979–83) ====
- Eva Perón: Loni Ackerman, Nancy Opel, Pamela Blake
- Che: Anthony Crivello
- Juan Perón: David Cryer

==== Broadway (2012–13) ====
- Che: Max von Essen

== Musical numbers ==
=== Act 1 ===
- "A Cinema in Buenos Aires, 26 July 1952" – Crowd
- "Requiem for Evita" – Chorus
- "Oh What a Circus" – Che and Crowd
- "On This Night of a Thousand Stars" – Magaldi
- "Eva and Magaldi" / "Eva, Beware of the City" – Eva, Magaldi, Che and Evita's Family
- "Buenos Aires" – Eva, Che and Crowd
- "Goodnight and Thank You" – Che, Eva, Magaldi and Lovers
- "The Lady's Got Potential" – Che
- "The Art of the Possible" – Perón, Generals and Eva
- "Charity Concert" – Perón, Che, Magaldi and Eva
- "I'd Be Surprisingly Good for You" – Eva and Perón
- "Hello and Goodbye" – Eva
- "Another Suitcase in Another Hall" – Perón's Mistress and Men's Chorus
- "Peron's Latest Flame" – Che, Aristocrats, Soldiers and Eva
- "A New Argentina" – Eva, Che, Perón and Crowd

=== Act 2 ===
- Entr'acte
- "On the Balcony of the Casa Rosada" – Perón, Che and Crowd
- "Don't Cry for Me Argentina" – Eva
- "High Flying, Adored" – Che and Eva
- "Rainbow High" – Eva and Dressers
- "Rainbow Tour" – Perón, Advisers and Che
- "The Actress Hasn't Learned the Lines (You'd Like to Hear)" – Eva, Aristocrats and Che
- "And the Money Kept Rolling In (And Out)" – Che and Crowd
- "Santa Evita" – Children and Chorus
- "Waltz for Eva and Che" – Eva and Che
- "You Must Love Me" – Eva
- "Peron's Latest Flame Playoff" – Soldiers
- "She Is a Diamond" – Perón
- "Dice Are Rolling" / "Eva's Sonnet" – Perón and Eva
- "Eva's Final Broadcast" – Eva and Che
- "Montage" – Eva, Che, Perón, Magaldi and Chorus
- "Lament" – Eva, Embalmers and Che

Notes

- "A Cinema in Buenos Aires, 26 July 1952" was replaced by "Junin, 26 July 1952" for the Japanese productions, London and Broadway revivals.
- "The Lady's Got Potential" is usually cut from most of the productions and replaced with "The Art of the Possible," but a modified version has appeared in a number of stagings. It was revived by Alan Parker for the film, with modified lyrics by Tim Rice to remove the insecticide sub-plot.
- "You Must Love Me", written for the 1996 film, was added to the 2006 London production and several other post-film productions; its placement varies from right after "Waltz for Eva and Che" to right before "Eva's Final Broadcast."
- "Peron's Latest Flame Playoff" is often subsumed into the following song, "She is a Diamond".

See Evita for the song list from the 1976 concept album.

== History ==
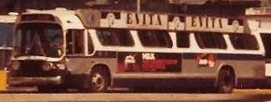
A bus in New York featuring an Evita advertisement in 1982

In 1972, Robert Stigwood proposed that Andrew Lloyd Webber and Tim Rice develop a new musical version of Peter Pan, but abandoned the project.

Travelling late to a meal one night in 1973, though, Rice heard the end of a radio show about Eva Perón which intrigued him. As a child stamp collector, he had been fascinated by her image on the Argentine stamps, but was unaware of her significance in Argentina's history. He began research and was introduced by a Cinema International Corporation executive to the Argentine film director Carlos Pasini Hansen who had produced the TV film Queen of Hearts, which had aired in the UK on 24 October 1972. The executive also arranged for Rice to see the film at Thames Television which he did "at least twenty times" saying also that "by that time I had seen Pasini's superbly researched film, I was hooked." The more Rice investigated Eva Perón, going so far as to travel to Buenos Aires to research her life with many documents and contacts that Pasini had supplied, the more fascinated he became by the woman; he even named his first daughter after her.

Rice suggested the idea of a musical based on the subject to Lloyd Webber, but although the idea of writing a score including tangos, paso dobles, and similar Latin flavours intrigued him, Lloyd Webber ultimately rejected the idea. He decided instead to collaborate with Alan Ayckbourn on Jeeves, a traditional Rodgers and Hart-style musical based on the P. G. Wodehouse character, which proved to be a critical and commercial failure. After Jeeves, Lloyd Webber returned to Rice, and they began developing Rice's proposed musical.

The authors of the 1996 book Evita: The Real Life of Eva Perón claim the musical was based on Mary Main's biography The Woman with the Whip, which was extremely critical of Eva Perón. Rice created the character "Che" to serve as both narrator and represent the voice of the lower, working class, providing insight and criticism to Eva's character. When Harold Prince later became involved with the project, he insisted that the actors portraying Che should use Che Guevara as a role model. In the 1996 film adaptation, the character returned to his more anonymous roots. This was also the case for the 2006 London revival.

Lloyd Webber and the conductor Anthony Bowles presented the musical at the second Sydmonton Fest before making the first recording with the London Philharmonic Orchestra.

== Musical analysis ==
The musical employs an eclectic range of styles. Classical music in Evita includes the opening choral piece ("Requiem for Evita") and a choral interlude in "Oh What a Circus", as well as instrumental passages throughout the musical such as the orchestral version of the "Lament" and the introduction to "Don't Cry for Me Argentina". Rhythmic Latinate styles are heard in pieces such as "Buenos Aires", "And the Money Kept Rolling in (And Out)" and "On This Night of a Thousand Stars", while ballads include "High Flying, Adored" and "Another Suitcase in Another Hall". Rock music includes "Oh What a Circus", "Perón's Latest Flame", and a song cut from the original production called "The Lady's Got Potential". The song was reinstated for the 1996 film with revised lyrics by Rice, and has also been used in Japanese, Czech, and Danish stage productions to expand on Argentine history for audiences less familiar with the subject.

== Historical accuracy ==
Tomás Eloy Martínez noted:

Che as well as Evita symbolise certain naïve, but effective, beliefs: the hope for a better world; a life sacrificed on the altar of the disinherited, the humiliated, the poor of the earth. They are myths which somehow reproduce the image of Christ.

The lyrics and storyline of the musical are influenced by Mary Main's biography, Evita: The Woman with the Whip, which drew heavily upon the accounts of anti-Perónist Argentines. Shortly after the musical appeared, Nicholas Fraser and Marysa Navarro published a more neutral account of Eva Perón's life, Evita: The Real Lives of Eva Perón, in which they claim that many of Main's assertions were false, such as the suggestion that Eva had first gone to Buenos Aires as the mistress of a married musician, Agustín Magaldi. Instead, they wrote, Eva's mother Doña Juana had taken her there when she aspired to become a radio actress. Some critics also suggested that Rice's lyrics disparaged Evita's achievements unnecessarily, particularly her charity work. According to Navarro and Fraser,

Although [Evita] was based for the most part on the earliest and seamiest versions of Evita's life, something happened to the tale in its retelling and the Evita who emerged each evening, dressed first as a teenager, then a hooker, and finally, in tulle and silver foil, as First Lady, was far from being unsympathetic.

Following the success of the film version of Evita, in 1996, an Argentine film biography of Eva Perón was released, Eva Perón: The True Story, asserting that it corrected distortions in the musical's account.

== Resident productions ==
=== Original West End production ===
When the recording was released, Lloyd Webber had sent a copy to the American director Harold Prince and invited him to become involved with the eventual staging. Prince agreed, commenting, "Any opera that begins with a funeral can't be all bad", but he advised them that he could not take on any new commitments for the next two years. In the meantime, Lloyd Webber and Rice reworked several elements of the show. Some songs were dropped and some shortened, while others were introduced and some lyrics rewritten. Prince eventually confirmed that he would be ready to start rehearsals in early 1978. When he began working on the project in May, he suggested few changes, other than for deleting Che's rock number "The Lady's Got Potential". Prince requested a song he could stage to chart Perón's rise to power, and Rice and Lloyd Webber responded with the musical chairs number "The Art of the Possible", during which military officers are eliminated until only Perón remains.

Evita opened at the Prince Edward Theatre on 21 June 1978 and closed on 8 February 1986, after 3,176 performances. Elaine Paige played Eva with David Essex as Che, Joss Ackland as Perón, Mark Ryan (actor) as Magaldi and Siobhán McCarthy as Mistress. Paige was selected from among many hopefuls, after Julie Covington declined the role. The production was directed by Harold Prince, choreographed by Larry Fuller, and produced by Robert Stigwood. Paige was succeeded by Marti Webb, Stephanie Lawrence, Siobhán McCarthy (who had played The Mistress when the show opened), Jacquey Chappell and ultimately, Kathryn Evans with Maria Morgan.

Webb originally played the role during Paige's holiday and was persuaded by Prince to remain in the cast as an alternate for two shows each week to aid the transition when she took over the role. This set the precedent until the show closed, with Lawrence becoming Webb's alternate. Michele Breeze, Paige's original understudy never inherited the role in London but later created it for the original New Zealand production. Susannah Fellows also understudied Eva.

Gary Bond replaced David Essex as Che, then Mark Ryan, who had first starred as Magaldi, later assumed the role, followed by Martin Smith and Jimmy Kean. Ackland's replacements included John Turner, Oz Clarke and Daniel Benzali.

In his review in The Sunday Times, Derek Jewell called the show "quite marvellous" and described Lloyd Webber's "ambitious" score "an unparallelled fusion of 20th century musical experience" and Rice's lyrics as "trenchant" and "witty". Bernard Levin of The Times disliked it, however, calling it as an "odious artefact ... that calls itself an opera ... merely because the clichés between the songs are sung rather than spoken" and "one of the most disagreeable evenings I have ever spent in my life".

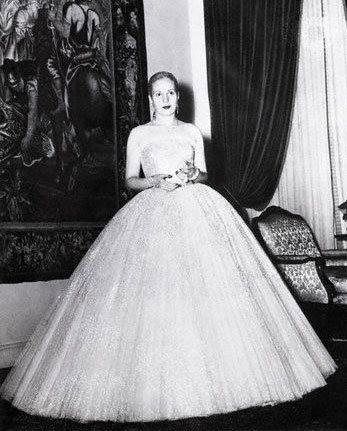
The iconic diamond encrusted dress for the balcony scene was inspired by an actual dress for Perón by Christian Dior.

This production won the Laurence Olivier Award for Best New Musical, and Elaine Paige won the Laurence Olivier Award for Best Performance in a Musical at the 1978 Laurence Olivier Awards. Also receiving Olivier Award nominations were Harold Prince (Best Director) and David Essex (Best Performance in a Musical).

Timothy O'Brien and Tazeena Firth collaborated on the design of the show. The set was minimal, with a scaffolded balcony running along the back and sides of the stage and images projected onto a screen above. Madame Tussauds produced a wax figurine of Eva, based on Elaine Paige, for the coffin during the funeral scene at the beginning of the show. Inspired by the murals of Diego Rivera, Prince suggested the proscenium be flanked by artwork depicting the struggles of the Argentine peasants. He jettisoned the original monochromatic costumes designed for the chorus members and dancers; instead, he had them go to charity and secondhand clothing shops to purchase costumes. The now iconic balcony scene featured Eva in a broad, diamond encrusted white dress based on one actually owned by Eva Perón which had been designed by Christian Dior addressing a crowd from the rear balcony of the stage.

The Evita: Original London Cast Recording was recorded in 1978 and released by MCA Records. Some releases mistakenly refer to the concept album as the Original London Cast Recording.

The original London production transferred to the Opera House in Manchester for an extended run following its closure at the Prince Edward Theatre. Kathryn Evans and Jimmy Kean played Eva and Che with Ria Jones and John Barr being their alternates.

=== Original Broadway production ===
Poster for the Broadway production with Patti LuPone in the title role

After debuting at the Dorothy Chandler Pavilion in Los Angeles, with a subsequent engagement at the Orpheum Theatre in San Francisco, the Broadway production opened at the Broadway Theatre on 25 September 1979 and closed on 26 June 1983, after 1,567 performances and 17 previews. Patti LuPone starred as Eva, with Mandy Patinkin as Che, Bob Gunton as Perón, Mark Syers as Magaldi, and Jane Ohringer as Perón's mistress. Harold Prince directed with choreography by Larry Fuller. During the run, six actresses alternated playing the title role, in addition to LuPone: Terri Klausner (matinees), Nancy Opel (matinees), Pamela Blake (matinees), Derin Altay, Loni Ackerman and Florence Lacey. Patinkin was replaced by James Stein and later by Anthony Crivello. The production won seven Tony Awards, including Best Musical.

New York Times critic Frank Rich stated: "Loni Ackerman, the current Eva Perón, has no discernible Latin blood, but she sings the role better than any of the American Evitas, as well as acting and dancing it with nonstop energy. Anthony Crivello, a performer new to me, is easily the best Che I've seen in New York or London: not only does he have a supple voice, but he also moves with such grace that he lightens the heavy, moralizing tone his character must bear. He's so effective, in fact, that he almost convinces you that there's a sound reason for Che Guevara to be dragged into the Peron saga." Tom Carter understudied Patinkin and performed as Che.

LuPone's performance brought her massive acclaim, but she struggled to hit the high notes night after night. "It's horrible. When I first heard the score to Evita, I thought Andrew Lloyd Webber hated women because the score's written in a soprano's passaggio. If you think of a rubber band and you pull a rubber band, the weakest spot is in the middle. That's a passaggio. You have a chest voice and a head voice, and then right in the middle is where you have to negotiate changing gears and all of the high notes are written in that break. The fact that I willed my voice every single night to hit those notes and I didn't do more damage to my voice is shocking. The role itself is pretty spectacular. I had a blast acting it — I couldn't sing it. And every night I went on stage in terror, absolute terror. That's not good for the soul. It's not good for the head. It's not good for anything. But I knew it was my test. I knew that if I survived this, I could survive anything."

Elaine Paige was originally told she would re-create her role in the Broadway production, however the Actors' Equity Association refused permission for a non-American. Prince attempted to persuade the organisation for a second time when LuPone was suffering vocal problems before the production reached New York. LuPone stated in her memoir that this was nothing more than a rumour started by Prince himself to build publicity. She, however, had her own doubts about that being true.

=== Original Australian production ===
The original Australian production opened at the Adelaide Festival Theatre on 30 April 1980. It featured Jennifer Murphy as Eva, John O'May as Che, Peter Carroll as Perón, Tony Alvarez as Magaldi, and Laura Mitchell as Perón's mistress. Patti LuPone took over the title role in mid-1981 during its Sydney run after Murphy left the production. LuPone's experience in the Sydney production was a much more positive one than her time on Broadway because by that time she felt comfortable singing the score and enjoyed playing the part.

=== Spain (1980); Mexico (1981); Brazil (1983) ===
The first Spanish language version premiered at the Teatro Monumental in Madrid on 23 December 1980, directed by Jaime Azpilicueta and with Paloma San Basilio as Eva, Patxi Andión as Che, Julio Catania as Perón, Tony Landa as Magaldi and Montserrat Vega as Perón's mistress. A double album recorded by the original cast was released and the song "No llores por mí Argentina" became a hit single. This production later played in Barcelona and in other cities in Latin America.

In Mexico City the show premiered at the Teatro Ferrocarrilero on 26 June 1981, with Valeria Lynch and Rocío Banquells alternating as Eva, Jaime Garza and Javier Díaz Dueñas alternating as Che, Jorge Pais as Perón, César Millán as Magaldi and Carmen Delgado as Perón's mistress.

Directed by Maurício Shermann and starring Cláudia as Evita, Mauro Mendonça as Péron, Carlos Augusto Strazzer as Che, Sílvia Massari as Perón's mistress, and Hildon Prado as Magaldi, it premiered at Teatro João Caetano in Rio de Janeiro on 12 January 1983. It later moved to Teatro Palace in São Paulo in 1986. It opened to great success in Brazil, with the Brazilian singer Cláudia being considered by some critics as the best Evita of all the time. English producers Robert Stigwood and David Land, after watching the Brazilian production, said that Cláudia was the best Evita of all the singers who had played the role.

=== 2006 West End revival ===
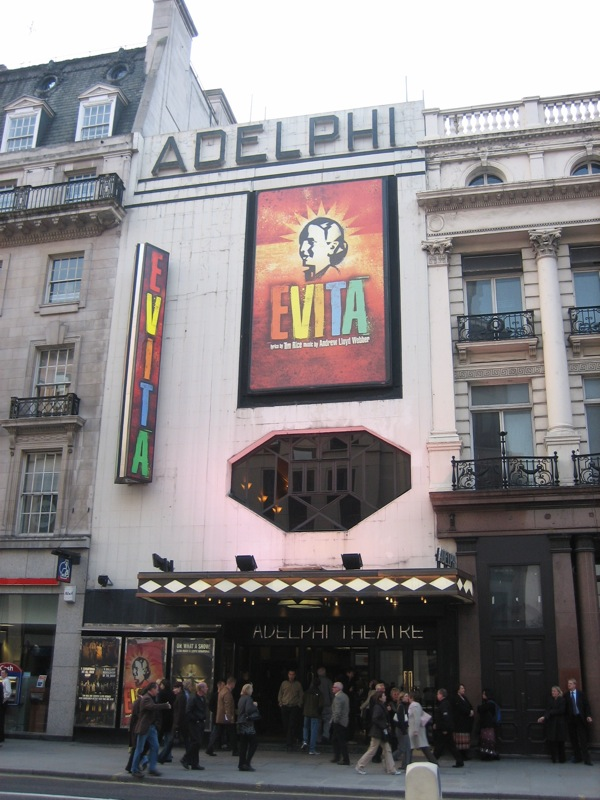
Evita at the Adelphi Theatre

On 2 June 2006, the first major London production of Evita since the original had closed 20 years earlier opened in the West End at the Adelphi Theatre. Directed by Michael Grandage, Argentine actress Elena Roger debuted as Eva, while Philip Quast appeared as Perón with Matt Rawle as Che. Its libretto included "You Must Love Me", written for the 1996 film, but which had not yet been included in an English-language stage production. The production opened to very positive reviews, but ticket sales were slow, which resulted in its closure on 26 May 2007 after a run of less than a year. Quast and Roger were nominated for Best Actor in a Musical and Best Actress in a Musical respectively for their performances at the 2007 Laurence Olivier Awards.

=== Stratford Shakespeare Festival (2010); Brazil (2011) ===
The Stratford Shakespeare Festival produced Evita as its first rock musical from 28 May to 6 November 2010. The principal characters are played by Chilina Kennedy (Eva), Juan Chioran (Juan), and Josh Young (Che), with direction by Gary Griffin.

A second Brazilian production directed by Jorge Takla premiered at Teatro Alfa in March 2011, with Paula Capovilla as Evita, Daniel Boaventura as Perón and Fred Silveira as Che.

=== 2012 Broadway revival ===
A Broadway revival of the show, based upon the 2006 West End production, ran at the Marquis Theatre, with Elena Roger in the title role, Ricky Martin as Che, Michael Cerveris as Perón, Max von Essen as Magaldi (he was also Ricky Martin's understudy) and Rachel Potter as Mistress. Christina DeCicco alternated with Roger as Eva. Michael Grandage again directed the production with choreography by Rob Ashford, set and costume design by Christopher Oram and lighting design by Neil Austin. The revival was produced by Hal Luftig and Scott Sanders. Previews began on 12 March 2012 with the official opening on 5 April 2012. The production was nominated for three Tony Awards, including Best Revival of a Musical at the 66th Tony Awards. It closed on 26 January 2013 after 337 performances and 26 previews.

=== 2013 Italy and 2017 Israel ===
The first Italian production premiered in Sanremo (IM) 5 December 2013, directed by Susanna Tagliapietra, with Italian lyrics by Marco Savatteri. The original cast included Simona Angioloni as Eva Duarte, Edoardo Pallanca as Che, Agostino Marafioti as Juan Perón, Matteo Merli as Magaldi, Diletta Mangolini as Mistress, replaced by Simona Marrocco in the touring production.

Israeli singer and actress Shiri Maimon starred in a production of Evita at Habima Theatre in Tel Aviv in 2017. Broadway producers impressed by her performance later invited her to star in Chicago on Broadway. In 2024, Maimon recorded a Hebrew rendition of "Don't Cry for Me Argentina" (אל נא תבכי ארגנטינה) accompanied by the Israel Philharmonic Orchestra.

=== 2025 West End revival ===
A West End revival based upon the 2019 production at Regent's Park Open Air Theatre began previews at the London Palladium on 14 June 2025 with its opening on 1 July. The limited run closed on 6 September 2025. Jamie Lloyd directed, with Rachel Zegler, in her West End debut, as Eva, Diego Andres Rodriguez as Che, James Olivas as Juan Perón, Aaron Lee Lambert as Agustín Magaldi, and Bella Brown as The Mistress/Alternate Eva.

The production stages the number "Don't Cry for Me Argentina" on the exterior balcony of the Palladium (Argyll Street) and is broadcast to the theatre audience using cameras outside and a large screen inside the theatre; the large crowds on the street watching this balcony scene can be contextualized as part of Eva Peron's "spectacle and political theatre".

The critical reception of the production was generally positive, with widespread praise being targeted towards Zegler’s performance. Arifa Akbar stated, in a three-star review in The Guardian: "Zegler is phenomenal but Jamie Lloyd’s rock show drowns out the story". Alice Saville, in a five-star review in The Independent, wrote that "Zegler is enthralling as Evita in this gorgeous sensory overload of a show." Andrzej Lukowski, in a four-star review in TimeOut, said: "Zegler is phenomenal, the balcony scene is incredible, Jamie Lloyd’s production is thrilling if occasionally incoherent". Nick Curtis rated the production five-stars in The Evening Standard, especially praising Zegler.

It was speculated that Jamie Lloyd and Lloyd Webber's relationship had become strained after Lloyd Webber revealed he thought the show was too loud and that some political aspects of the story were not very clear to audience members. He suggested they perhaps enjoyed the feeling of the evening rather than the story itself. When asked if Lloyd would make some changes to the story to make it clearer if it transferred to Broadway, he simply replied, "Jamie Lloyd is Jamie Lloyd".

=== 2027 Broadway revival ===
Jamie Lloyd's production of the musical is set to begin performances at the Winter Garden Theatre on Broadway on February 27, 2027 with an opening night set for March 25, with Zegler confirmed to reprise her role of Eva Perón.

In August 2025, Lloyd Webber said in an interview with Variety that he was unsure if the production would transfer to Broadway by 2027 because of the high cost of mounting Broadway musicals and that a tax credit program that helped Broadway come back from the COVID-19 pandemic by providing shows with millions of dollars in subsidies is running out of funding. In March 2026, when asked about a Broadway transfer during an interview with USA Today Lloyd Webber said, "I'm afraid with Evita, there are still some hoops to be gone through, but I'd love it to go. It's an extraordinary production. The one thing that absolutely cannot happen is what we did in London on the balcony. We can't do that in New York. I mean, something awful could happen. We have gun laws in Britain."

In the days leading to the announcement, logos from the production were placed around the city and on the account’s social media. Jamie Lloyd confirmed in the announcement that Zegler will not be performing "Don't Cry for Me Argentina" outdoors due to safety concerns and that a new idea will be explored.

=== Further productions ===
Regent's Park Open Air Theatre presented the musical (directed by Jamie Lloyd) from 2 August – 21 September 2019. The production starred Samantha Pauly in her London theatre debut as Eva, Ektor Rivera as Juan Peron, Trent Saunders as Che, Adam Pearce as Magaldi, and Frances Mayli McCann as the Mistress.

New York City Center also presented the musical in 2019, (directed by Sammi Cannold) from 13 – 24 November 2019. The musical opened to mixed reviews, and featured two actresses in the role of Eva. Maia Reficco as young Eva from 15–20, and Solea Pfeiffer from 20–33. Jason Gotay starred as Che, with Enrique Acevedo as Juan and Philip Hernández as Magaldi.

Cannold again directed the musical at the American Repertory Theatre in Cambridge, Massachusetts from May-July 2023 with Shereen Pimentel in the title role with Omar Lopez-Cepero as Che, Caesar Samayoa as Juan, and Gabriel Burrafato as Magaldi.

An all-star West End concert was performed at the Theatre Royal Drury Lane in July and August 2023, directed by Bill Deamer, starring Auli'i Cravalho as Eva, alongside Matt Rawle reprising his role of Che from the first West End revival and Jeremy Secomb reprising his role of Juan from the 2017 Europe tour. The concert featured a 30-piece orchestra and was produced by Fourth Wall Live and the London Musical Theatre Orchestra.

== Touring productions ==
There have been numerous US and international touring productions of the show:

=== Early 1980s US national tours ===
The 1980–1983 1st US national tour opened at the Shubert Theatre in Los Angeles and starred Loni Ackerman as Eva, Scott Holmes as Che, Jon Cypher as Juan Perón, Sal Mistretta as Magaldi and Cynthia Hunt as Perón's Mistress. The 1979-1983 2nd US national tour opened at the Shubert Theatre in Chicago and subsequently toured to major U.S. cities starring Valerie Perri as Eva, John Herrera as Che, Robb Alton as Juan Perón, Peter Marinos as Magaldi and Cynthia Simpson as Perón's Mistress. The 2nd National went on to finish touring Scandinavia. The 1984 3rd US National Tour opened at the Masonic Temple Theatre in Detroit and starred Florence Lacey as Eva, Tim Bowman as Che, John Leslie Wolfe as Juan Perón, Vincent Pirillo as Magaldi and Patricia Ludd as Perón's Mistress. In the 1983 and 1986 US tours, Florence Lacey played Eva.

=== 1987 UK and Irish tour ===
Rebecca Storm played Eva with Chris Corcoran as Che.

=== 1988 European tour ===
Rebecca (Becky) Norman played Eva with James Sbano as Che and David Wasson as Perón with performances in Italy, Holland and Germany.

=== 1989 world tour ===
Florence Lacey starred once more with James Sbano as Che and Robert Alton as Perón.

=== 1992-1994 US tour ===
A touring production was mounted in anticipation of the film version which lasted nearly two years and featured several actresses in the title role, including Valerie Perri, Donna Marie Asbury and Marla Schaffel. It was directed and choreographed by Larry Fuller and featured John Herrera and Daniel C. Cooney as Che.

=== 1995–1996 UK tour ===
Paul Nicholas and David Ian, with the original producers Robert Stigwood and David Land, mounted a version closely based on the original London production starring Marti Webb, one of the first performers to play Eva, with Chris Corcoran as Che, Duncan Smith as Perón, Leo Andrew as Magaldi and Poppy Tierney as the mistress. Despite some criticism over the casting of Webb at the age of 50, the success of the tour led to extensions throughout 1996.

=== 1998 US 20th anniversary tour ===
A tour, based on the original Broadway production, which was originally scheduled to play on Broadway in the 1999–2000 season started in Detroit on 3 November 1998 and closed in Boston, Massachusetts, in the summer of 1999. It starred Natalie Toro as Eva, with Raul Esparza as Che and Raymond Jaramillo McLeod as Juan Perón. This production focused more on Latin themes. According to Playbill, "The Latin casting is part of an effort to instill this production with a more culturally authentic feel." Toro received excellent reviews, along with her leading men.

=== 2004 US tour ===
A production opened in November 2004 with Kathy Voytko and Bradley Dean, directed by Harold Prince and Larry Fuller. This production closed in May 2007 but reopened later that year. It closed finally in June 2008.

=== 2008 UK tour ===
A tour, following the then recent London production, began in 2008 starring Louise Dearman and later Rachael Wooding as Eva, Seamus Cullen (a finalist in the BBC show Any Dream Will Do) as Che, Mark Heenehan as Perón with James Waud as Magaldi who won the role in a competition, and Nikki Mae as Perón's Mistress, later Carly Bowmen. The UK tour ended in late 2009 but was remounted in March 2010, touring throughout Europe until April 2011. It continued in the UK and Germany from May to September 2011 featuring Abigail Jaye as Eva, Mark Powell as Che, Mark Heenehan as Perón and Reuben Kaye as Magaldi. Earl Carpenter would later replace Heenehan.

=== 2013 US tour ===
A US national tour of the musical, based on the 2012 Broadway revival, began in September 2013. The cast for the tour included Caroline Bowman as Eva, Josh Young as Che, Sean McLaughlin as Perón, Christopher Johnstone as Magaldi, Krystina Alabado as Mistress and Desi Oakley as the alternate for Eva Perón.

=== 2013–2014 UK tour ===
A tour, announced after the success of the Broadway production of the show, which was produced by Bill Kenwright. It opened on 15 May 2013 at the New Wimbledon Theatre, before dates at the Glasgow Kings Theatre, Theatre Royal Norwich, and the Wolverhampton Grand. The production starred Marti Pellow, the lead singer of the band Wet Wet Wet, as Che, Andrew C Wadsworth as Juan Perón, and Madalena Alberto as Eva Perón. The tour concluded with 55 performances at the Dominion Theatre in the West End in September and October 2014. This production was directed by Bob Thompson, with choreography by Bill Deamer, and musical direction by David Steadman.

=== 2017 UK tour ===
A replica of the 2013–2014 UK Tour began touring early 2017, once again in the UK. Led by Emma Hatton, with Gian Marco Schiaretti as Che; Jeremy Secomb as Juan Perón; Oscar Balmaseda as Magaldi and Sarah O’Connor as the Mistress; this production ran through to July. In the same way the previous tour had a limited London run, this production performed a limited 91 performance run (due to the failure of The Girls) at the Phoenix Theatre from July to October 2017. Hatton reprised her role along with all her previous cast members. The tour then continued into 2018.

=== 2017/2018 international tour ===
A revival of the original production (as directed by Hal Prince and choreographed by Larry Fuller) toured South Africa, Japan, Singapore, Taiwan, and Hong Kong, featuring a cast from South Africa and led by Emma Kingston from the UK in the title role.

The Singapore season ran from 23 February 2018 to 18 March 2018 in the Marina Bay Sands Theatre. 18 young talents were selected to be cast in this Evita production. Three sets of six children alternate in ensemble roles. The young actors are: Federica Aramburu, Lilo Baier, Mika Barel, Charmaine Chan, Hindya Dickinson, Jasmine Huilian Ellis, Gabriel Frade, Sam Howie, Annabelle Jarvis, Jayden Alim Lai, Lia Marie Elaine Macdonell, Max Makatsaria, Nanako Masui, Faith Ong, Sofia Ella Poston, Sebastian Street, Damien Rocco Weber, Charisse Low Yu Xin.

=== 2018 Australian tour ===
A 2018 Australian revival of the stage musical, directed by Harold Prince, was announced on 21 August 2017, by Opera Australia, with Australian singer-songwriter, musician, musical theatre actress Tina Arena being confirmed as the lead actress. The stage tour production began at the Sydney Opera House, in the Joan Sutherland Theatre, with opening night on 13 September, running to 3 November 2018. The next venue on the national tour leg was the Arts Centre Melbourne, from 5–30 December 2018. Arena said she felt the time was right to tackle the role. "I have been approached to do this role on a couple of occasions," Arena stated. "I never felt emotionally ready for it. I felt I had a lot of living and learning before I could get up and take on the enormity of the story and the human spirit she possessed".

On 7 May 2018, Opera Australia Artistic Director Lyndon Terracini, along with producers John Frost and David Ian, announced the full cast for the upcoming Australian production of Evita. With Arena announced in the lead role as Eva Perón, the remainder of the cast was announced as: Paulo Szot, Brazilian operatic baritone in the role of Juan Perón; Kurt Kansley would take on the role of the revolutionary Che. Michael Falzon would portray tango singer Agustín Magaldi, while the role of Perón's Mistress would be played by Alexis van Maanen. Jemma Rix was cast as the alternate Eva Perón and was scheduled to be appearing in the role at least once a week (the Wednesday 7:30 pm show) throughout the Sydney season, according to the Evita-Australia website.

On 21 July 2018, Opera Australia Artistic Director Lyndon Terracini, along with producers John Frost and David Ian, announced the 18 young performers who have been cast in the upcoming production of Evita, in season at the Sydney Opera House from September 2018. Three sets of six children alternated in ensemble roles. The young actors are: Jack Barton, Alysiah Carlino, Julien Daher, Jacob Drew, Paige Hewlett, BeBe Liu-Brennan, Robbi Morgan, Allerah Murdock, William Oakley, Pamelia Papacosta, Benjamin Park, Sara Petrovski, Raffaella Reid, Avaleigh Rock, Amelie Rose, Austin Taylor, Oliver Trus, and Zoe Zantey.

== Film adaptation ==
Plans for a film directed by Ken Russell developed soon after the West End and Broadway openings. Much speculation of potential leads included Barbra Streisand or Liza Minnelli as Eva, and Barry Gibb or Elton John as Che. These plans never came to fruition.

Russell has said that his own first choice for the film lead was Karla DeVito, who had come to fame in rock tours and on Broadway, where she had impressed the wife of Andrew Lloyd Webber. DeVito was screen tested for the role while in England shooting music videos for her solo album Is This A Cool World or What? DeVito's performance of "Don't Cry For Me Argentina" in the screen test caused much positive buzz. Russell wrote that she brought viewers to tears (except Tim Rice – who wanted Elaine Paige, with whom he was romantically involved). Although Russell rejected the idea, Paige was screen tested twice.

Russell's biography indicates that he met with Barbra Streisand, who dismissed the role immediately. He wrote that he then suggested Liza Minnelli. A year had passed between the first screen tests and Minnelli's, which Russell reports was amazing. Russell approached Stigwood with Minnelli's test, convinced she had the necessary talent and star quality, but he was soon told it was going to be Elaine Paige. Having already protested that idea, Russell quit the film. Years later when he saw Karla DeVito again, Russell addressed her as "My Evita."

It was not until 1996 that Evita came to the big screen. Alan Parker directed the film, with Madonna in the title role, Antonio Banderas as Che and Jonathan Pryce as Perón. The film was nominated for five Academy Awards, winning one for Best Original Song ("You Must Love Me," composed especially for the film) at the 69th Academy Awards. Madonna received mixed reviews but won the Golden Globe Award for Best Actress – Motion Picture Musical or Comedy at the 54th Golden Globe Awards, where the film also won Best Picture–Musical or Comedy. The film was choreographed by Vincent Paterson.

== Awards and nominations ==
=== Original West End production ===
| Year | Award ceremony | Category | Nominee | Result |
|---|---|---|---|---|
| 1978 | Laurence Olivier Awards | Best New Musical | | Won |
| 1978 | Laurence Olivier Awards | Best Performance in a Musical | Elaine Paige | Won |
| 1978 | Laurence Olivier Awards | Best Performance in a Musical | David Essex | Nominated |
| 1978 | Laurence Olivier Awards | Director of the Year | Harold Prince | Nominated |

=== Original Broadway production ===
| Year | Award ceremony | Category | Nominee | Result |
|---|---|---|---|---|
| 1980 | Tony Award | Best Musical | | Won |
| 1980 | Tony Award | Best Original Score | Andrew Lloyd Webber and Tim Rice | Won |
| 1980 | Tony Award | Best Book of a Musical | Tim Rice | Won |
| 1980 | Tony Award | Best Actress in a Musical | Patti LuPone | Won |
| 1980 | Tony Award | Best Featured Actor in a Musical | Bob Gunton | Nominated |
| 1980 | Tony Award | Best Featured Actor in a Musical | Mandy Patinkin | Won |
| 1980 | Tony Award | Best Direction of a Musical | Harold Prince | Won |
| 1980 | Tony Award | Best Lighting Design | David Hersey | Won |
| 1980 | Tony Award | Best Scenic Design | Timothy O'Brien and Tazeena Firth | Nominated |
| 1980 | Tony Award | Best Costume Design | Timothy O'Brien and Tazeena Firth | Nominated |
| 1980 | Tony Award | Best Choreography | Larry Fuller | Nominated |
| 1980 | Drama Desk Award | Outstanding Musical | | Won |
| 1980 | Drama Desk Award | Outstanding Lyrics | Tim Rice | Won |
| 1980 | Drama Desk Award | Outstanding Music | Andrew Lloyd Webber | Won |
| 1980 | Drama Desk Award | Outstanding Actor in a Musical | Mandy Patinkin | Nominated |
| 1980 | Drama Desk Award | Outstanding Actress in a Musical | Patti LuPone | Won |
| 1980 | Drama Desk Award | Outstanding Featured Actor in a Musical | Bob Gunton | Won |
| 1980 | Drama Desk Award | Outstanding Director of a Musical | Harold Prince | Won |
| 1980 | Drama Desk Award | Outstanding Choreography | Larry Fuller | Nominated |
| 1980 | Drama Desk Award | Outstanding Costume Design | Timothy O'Brien and Tazeena Firth | Nominated |
| 1980 | Drama Desk Award | Outstanding Lighting Design | David Hersey | Nominated |
| 1980 | Outer Critics Circle Award | Best Lyricist | Tim Rice | Won |
| 1980 | New York Drama Critics' Circle Award | Best Musical | | Won |

=== 2006 West End revival ===
| Year | Award ceremony | Category | Nominee | Result |
|---|---|---|---|---|
| 2007 | Laurence Olivier Award | Best Musical Revival | | Nominated |
| 2007 | Laurence Olivier Award | Best Actor in a Musical | Philip Quast | Nominated |
| 2007 | Laurence Olivier Award | Best Actress in a Musical | Elena Roger | Nominated |
| 2007 | Laurence Olivier Award | Best Theatre Choreographer | Rob Ashford | Nominated |

=== 2012 Broadway revival ===
| Year | Award | Category | Nominee | Result |
|---|---|---|---|---|
| 2012 | Tony Award | Best Revival of a Musical | | Nominated |
| 2012 | Tony Award | Best Performance by a Featured Actor in a Musical | Michael Cerveris | Nominated |
| 2012 | Tony Award | Best Choreography | Rob Ashford | Nominated |
| 2012 | Drama Desk Award | Outstanding Revival of a Musical | | Nominated |
| 2012 | Drama Desk Award | Outstanding Actor in a Musical | Ricky Martin | Nominated |
| 2012 | Drama Desk Award | Outstanding Featured Actor in a Musical | Michael Cerveris | Nominated |
| 2012 | Drama Desk Award | Outstanding Choreography | Rob Ashford | Nominated |
| 2012 | Drama Desk Award | Outstanding Lighting Design | Neil Austin | Nominated |

=== 2019 Regent's Park Open Air Theatre production ===
| Year | Award | Category | Nominee | Result |
|---|---|---|---|---|
| 2019 | Critics’ Circle Theatre Award | Best Director | Jamie Lloyd | Won |
| 2019 | Evening Standard Theatre Award | Best Musical | | Won |
| 2020 | Laurence Olivier Award | Best Musical Revival | | Nominated |
| 2020 | Laurence Olivier Award | Best Theatre Choreographer | Fabian Aloise | Nominated |

=== 2025 West End revival ===
| Year | Award ceremony | Category | Nominee | Result |
|---|---|---|---|---|
| 2026 | Critics' Circle Theatre Awards | Best Revival Of A Play Or Musical | | Nominated |
| 2026 | Critics' Circle Theatre Awards | Best Director | Jamie Lloyd | Nominated |
| 2026 | Critics' Circle Theatre Awards | Best Actress | Rachel Zegler | Nominated |
| 2026 | Critics' Circle Theatre Awards | Best Designer | Soutra Gilmour | Nominated |
| 2026 | Critics' Circle Theatre Awards | Best Newcomer | Diego Andres Rodriguez | Nominated |
| 2026 | Laurence Olivier Awards | Best Musical Revival | | Nominated |
| 2026 | Laurence Olivier Awards | Best Actor in a Musical | Diego Andres Rodriguez | Nominated |
| 2026 | Laurence Olivier Awards | Best Actress in a Musical | Rachel Zegler | Won |
| 2026 | Laurence Olivier Awards | Best Theatre Choreographer | Fabian Aloise | Won |
| 2026 | Laurence Olivier Awards | Best Lighting Design | Jon Clark | Nominated |
| 2026 | Standard Theatre Awards | Best Musical | | Won |
| 2026 | Standard Theatre Awards | Best Musical Performance | Rachel Zegler | Won |
| 2026 | Standard Theatre Awards | Emerging Talent | Diego Andres Rodriguez | Nominated |

== Cultural impact ==
Evita came in sixth in a BBC Radio 2 listener poll of the UK's "Number One Essential Musicals".

One episode of The Simpsons, "The President Wore Pearls", has a plot loosely based on the musical, with Lisa Simpson (Yeardley Smith) in Eva's role. The episode includes parodies of songs such as "A Vote for a Winner" which includes the lyrics, "don't cry for me, kids of Springfield". At the end of the episode, a comical disclaimer is displayed stating, "On the advice of our lawyers, we swear we have never heard of a musical based on the life of Eva Perón".

During the Glee episode "Special Education", the characters Kurt Hummel (Chris Colfer) and Rachel Berry (Lea Michele) sing "Don't Cry for Me Argentina" when Kurt is auditioning for a solo in the Warblers for Sectionals. In the season three episode "Hold On to Sixteen", a rival showchoir sings "Buenos Aires" as their competition piece.

In the short "The Ballad of Magellan" in the cartoon series Animaniacs, the country of Argentina is depicted with a sign reading, "EVITA Coming Soon!".

== Recordings ==
As they had previously done with Jesus Christ Superstar, the songwriting team decided to record Evita as an album musical and selected actress and singer Julie Covington to sing the title role, after having caught an episode of Rock Follies and remembered her from the original London production of Godspell. The recording, which was released by MCA Records who had previously marketed Jesus Christ Superstar, commenced in April 1976 and was produced by Lloyd Webber and Rice. The recording was engineered by David Hamilton Smith, whose work Rice later acknowledged was effectively that of a third producer. He also delivered the line, "Statesmanship is more than entertaining peasants," a rebuttal to Eva's balcony speech on the album.

Released in 1976, the two-record set included Paul Jones as Juan Perón, Colm Wilkinson as Che, Barbara Dickson as Perón's mistress, and Tony Christie as Agustín Magaldi. The writers had originally considered Steve Marriott and John Fogerty but neither was interested. Murray Head, who had enormous success with the Superstar album, recorded some demos but Rice later admitted they "didn't really reproduce the magic that his portrayal of Judas had." Colm Wilkinson had recently played Judas in the London production of Superstar and agreed to audition: "It only took a couple of verses to know he was our man."

Mike d'Abo, who had succeeded Paul Jones as lead singer of Manfred Mann, had a minor role on the album which was notable as the first one which both had appeared. Mike Smith, former lead vocalist with the Dave Clark Five and d'Abo's then working partner, also appeared.

Pasini wrote the dialogue in Spanish of the first scene, "A Cinema in Buenos Aires, 26 July 1952". On this recording, he played the part of the actor in the soundtrack of a movie that grinds to a halt and also read the official communique of Eva's death. When the album was presented to the press at Lloyd Webber's country home Sydmonton, Pasini organised a photographic presentation with his colleague Anton Furst to accompany it. His contribution to the development of the project was recognised as Rice and Lloyd Webber acknowledged him first in a thank you speech afterwards.

In Britain, Australia, South Africa, South America, and various parts of Europe, sales of the concept album exceeded those of Jesus Christ Superstar; in the United States, however, it never achieved the same level of success. Covington's recording of "Don't Cry for Me Argentina" (originally entitled "It's Only Your Lover Returning") was released in October 1976. It reached No. 1 on the UK Singles Chart and enjoyed similar success internationally. Dickson's "Another Suitcase in Another Hall" also became a hit. In the US and UK, respectively, Karen Carpenter, Olivia Newton-John, and Petula Clark released cover versions of "Don't Cry for Me Argentina".

Cover of Original Broadway Recording

The first stage cast recording of Evita was of the original London production in 1978. The original Broadway cast was recorded for the album entitled Evita: Premiere American Recording, released in 1979. Lloyd Webber and Rice produced these first three recordings.

At least 25 English language cast albums have been released, along with many foreign language recordings. There are currently four in Spanish, five German, three in Japanese, and two in Hebrew, with additional recordings in Czech, Danish, Dutch, French, Hungarian, Icelandic, Korean, Portuguese, and Swedish.

Soprano Kiri Te Kanawa recorded a complete operatic version of the score with Christopher Lee as Perón. This recording, however, has never been released. Marti Webb also recorded a highlights album of sorts for the Pickwick Records label that featured Dave Willetts and Carl Wayne. It was released to coincide with the 1995 UK Tour of the show in which Webb starred.

Credited as "Festival," disco producer Boris Midney released an entire 1979 album of disco versions of key Evita songs at the behest of impresario Robert Stigwood. The album reached #1 on the disco charts, and the disco version of "Don't Cry For Me, Argentina" reached #72 on the Hot 100 Singles chart.

=== English cast albums ===
| Album | Year of release | Country | Type | Principals | Notes |
|---|---|---|---|---|---|
| Evita: An opera based on the life story of Eva Perón 1919 – 1952 | 1976 | UK | Complete: Peaked at number 6 in Australia in 1977 | Julie Covington; Colm Wilkinson; Paul Jones; Barbara Dickson | Cast assembled for studio recording; CD releases often mislabeled as the London Cast Recording |
| Evita: Original London Cast Recording | 1978 | UK | Highlights | Elaine Paige; David Essex; Joss Ackland; Siobhan McCarthy | Recording of the original London production: Peaked at number 81 in Australia in 1980 |
| Evita: Premiere American Recording | 1979 | US | Complete | Patti LuPone; Mandy Patinkin; Bob Gunton | Recording of the original Broadway production |
| Evita: Premiere Australian Recording | 1980 | AUS | Highlights | | Recording of the original Australian production.: Peaked at number 33 in Australia in 1980 |
| Evita: Highlights of the Original Broadway Production for the World Tour 89/90 | 1989 | US | Highlights | Florence Lacey; James Sbano; Robert Alton; Suzan Postel | Cast of the 1989/90 World Tour |
| Evita: The Complete Motion Picture Music Soundtrack | 1996 | US | Complete | Madonna; Antonio Banderas; Jonathan Pryce | Double-CD soundtrack of the motion picture. Highlights released separately as the single-CD Evita: Music from the Motion Picture. |
| Evita: 2006 London Cast Recording | 2006 | UK | Highlights | Elena Roger; Matt Rawle; Philip Quast | Recording of the 2006 London production |
| Evita: New Broadway Cast Recording | 2012 | US | Complete | Elena Roger; Ricky Martin; Michael Cerveris | Recording of the 2012 Broadway production |
| EVITA: The Full Album | 2026 | UK | Complete | Rachel Zegler; Diego Andres Rodriguez; James Olivas | Recording of the 2025 London production. Highlights released separately as EVITA. |
