= Ricafort =

Ricafort is a surname. Notable people with the surname include:

- Catherine Ricafort, American actress and singer
- Mariano Ricafort Palacín y Abarca (1776–1846), Governor of Cuba
