= Haruki Fujimoto =

Haruki Fujimoto (藤本 治貴) was a Japanese-born theatre performer, dancer, choreographer, and teacher.

== Career ==
Born in Hiroshima, and educated in Osaka at the Hanayagi Dance School, he had a career in America. As a dancer, Fujimoto took part in experimental and modern choreography, dancing with the companies of both Donald McKayle and Sophie Maslow. Fujimoto made his Broadway debut in 1966 in the original production of It's a Bird...It's a Plane...It's Superman directed by Harold Prince. He also performed on national tours of On a Clear Day You Can See Forever, The Music Man, and Funny Girl, as well as the original production of Chu Chem, which closed during its tryout phase prior to reaching Broadway. Ten years after "Superman", Fujimoto returned to Broadway, reuniting with Prince for the musical Pacific Overtures, with music and lyrics by Stephen Sondheim and a book by John Weidman. Pacific Overtures used a blend of kabuki and Western theatre techniques to tell the story of Japan's opening from 250 years of isolation. In addition to being the kabuki consultant, dance captain, assistant to the choreographer, and playing various silent roles as a member of the company (including Kayama's servant, a rickshaw operator, and a dancer in the finale), Fujimoto created the role of Commodore Matthew Calbraith Perry. The role was silent, standing on stage for most of its scenes with outside sound effects used to simulate the commodore's commands, but Act I ended with a unique and rousing "Lion Dance" which foreshadowed the influence of America within Japan, a key theme of the show and in Act II. Choreographed by Patricia Birch with dance music by Daniel Troob, the Lion Dance received mentions in two reviews by The New York Times; both the mixed review from Clive Barnes and the negative review from Walter Kerr. The dance was enough to earn Fujimoto a Drama Desk Award nomination for Outstanding Featured Actor in a Musical, being the only performer from the show to earn a nomination (two other actors, Mako Iwamatsu and Isao Sato were nominated for Tony Awards). He lost to George Rose for his performance in a revival of My Fair Lady. Fujimoto can still be seen as the cover art for the original cast album of Pacific Overtures. Certified as a Natori in Japanese dance, Fujimoto taught at Hollins University in Virginia from 1970-1990. He died on October 12, 2006.
