= Isao Satō =

Isao Satō may refer to:

- Isao Sato (actor) (1949–1990), Japanese actor
- Isao Satō (astronomer) (born 1963), Japanese astronomer

== See also ==
- Asteroid 6338 Isaosato, named after the astronomer
