= Jonathan Goble =

American Christian missionary

The Reverend Jonathan Goble (1827–1897) was an American Free Baptist minister and missionary in Yokohama, Japan. He travelled with Matthew C. Perry to Japan in 1853. While there, he learned the Japanese language. He returned as the first Baptist missionary to Japan in 1860. It is said that around 1869, he built the first rickshaw to transport his invalid wife Eliza Goble around the city. However, there are numerous other theories about the origin of the rickshaw.

== Name ==
His name is listed variously as Jonathan Scobie, E. Jonathan Scobie and Jonathan Goble.

== In culture ==
Musical Theater: Jonathan Goble appears as a character (played by the narrator) in act two of the musical Pacific Overtures, explaining how he came to invent his rickshaw while a series of local residents working as runners pulling his rickshaw die of exhaustion, each instantly replaced by a new runner.
