= Honeymoon in Vegas (musical) =

- Broadway Playbill cover
- Music: Jason Robert Brown
- Lyrics: Jason Robert Brown
- Book: Andrew Bergman
- Basis: Honeymoon in Vegas by Andrew Bergman
- Productions: 2013 Paper Mill Playhouse; 2015 Broadway; 2017 West End Concert

Honeymoon in Vegas is a musical with a book by Andrew Bergman and music and lyrics by Jason Robert Brown. The musical is based on the 1992 movie of the same name which Bergman also wrote and directed. The musical had its world premiere at the Paper Mill Playhouse and premiered on Broadway in January 2015.

== Productions ==
The musical held a workshop and backers auditions in October 2011, with T.R. Knight, Mary Faber, and Tony Danza in the leads. Nancy Opel, Alvin Ing, John Conlee, Rob Bartlett, and Deborah Lew also took part in the workshop, which was directed by Gary Griffin.

The musical had been originally scheduled to premiere in November 2012 in Toronto and to premiere on Broadway in the spring of 2013, but those plans fell through. When the Toronto engagement was called off, the producers said: "The New York producers have decided not to open the show in Toronto this fall because of scheduling issues. Future plans for the production will be announced soon."

Subsequently, the musical premiered at the Paper Mill Playhouse, Millburn, New Jersey on September 26, 2013 (previews), running through October 27, 2013, with an expected move to Broadway in 2014. Gary Griffin is the director, with choreography by Denis Jones, and Tony Danza starring as Tommy Korman. The cast features Rob McClure as Jack Singer, Brynn O'Malley as Betsy Nolan, Nancy Opel as Bea Singer, Matthew Saldivar as Johnny Sandwich, David Josefsberg as Buddy Rocky/Roy Bacon, and Catherine Ricafort as Mahi.

The musical opened on Broadway at the Nederlander Theatre on November 18, 2014, in previews, and officially on January 15, 2015. The cast featured Tony Danza as Tommy Korman, Rob McClure as Jack Singer, Brynn O'Malley as Betsy Nolan, Nancy Opel as Bea Singer, Matthew Saldivar as Johnny Sandwich, David Josefsberg as Buddy Rocky/Roy Bacon, and Catherine Ricafort as Mahi. The ensemble consisted of Matt Allen, Tracee Beazer, Grady McLeod Bowman, Barry Busby, Leslie Donna Flesner, Gaelen Gilliland, Albert Guerzon, Raymond J. Lee, George Merrick, Jessica Naimy, Zachary Prince, Catherine Ricafort, Jonalyn Saxer, Brendon Stimson, Erica Sweany, Cary Tedder, and Katie Webber.

On March 31, the producers announced its closing on Broadway due to poor sales at the box office. According to Playbill, "The musical was praised by critics, but failed to catch on at the box office." The show closed on Broadway on April 5, 2015.

On March 12, 2017, the London premiere was given by the London Musical Theatre Orchestra conducted by Jason Robert Brown in a semi-staged concert version at the London Palladium. The concert was met with rave reviews from audiences, three standing ovations and a speech and solo performance on piano and ukulele by Brown himself. The production, produced by Yeoburn and Price for United Theatrical, starred Maxwell Caulfield as Tommy, Samantha Barks as Betsy, Arthur Darvill as Jack, Rosemary Ashe as Bea Singer, Nicolas Colicos as Johnny Sandwich, Simon Lipkin as Buddy Rocky/Roy Bacon, Maisey Bawden as Mahi, Daniel Amity as Raymond, and Hywel Dowsell as Teihutu.

On April 9, 2024 a new Japanese production opened in Tokyo starring Kei Inoo of the idol group Hey! Say! JUMP as Jack. The production also starred Ruka Matsuda as Betsy, Daimu Kiriya as Bee, and Kohei Kamiguchi as Rocky.

== Synopsis ==
=== Act One ===
Jack Singer and his girlfriend of five years, Betsy Nolan, are in love ("I Love Betsy"). But when he tries to buy her an engagement ring, he suffers a panic attack as he remembers his mother's dying wish from ten years earlier—that he never marry, because no woman could love him as she did ("Never Get Married"). Betsy tells Jack that she can't wait indefinitely for him to deal with his issues ("Anywhere But Here"). He proposes that they elope to Las Vegas, and she accepts. They check into the Milano hotel ("When You Say Vegas"), and Betsy immediately catches the attention of Tommy Korman, a wealthy gambler; she bears an uncanny resemblance to his late wife Donna, an avid sunbather who died of skin cancer ("Out of the Sun"). He decides to steal Betsy from Jack ("The Invitation/Forever Starts Tonight"). Tommy invites Jack to a private poker game, so Betsy shops for a wedding dress ("Betsy's Getting Married/The Game"). Tommy beats Jack's straight flush with a royal flush, leaving Jack owing Tommy $58,000. Tommy proposes that Jack can be spared physical violence if he agrees to let Betsy spend the rest of the weekend with Tommy ("Come to an Agreement"). Betsy is incensed, but agrees to meet Tommy. Tommy charms Betsy with recollections of Donna and with his pride in their son who now has a wife and baby. Tommy shocks Jack by informing Betsy that he wants to spend their weekend together in Hawaii; Betsy is so angry at Jack that she agrees to leave with Tommy. Jack decides he must take action ("Do Something"), but is too late to stop them from boarding a plane; he buys a ticket to follow them.

=== Act Two ===
The travelers arrive in Hawaii ("Hawaii/Waiting for You"). Jack is approached by Teihutu and Mahi, who offer to guide him ("Every Day Is Happy in Hawaii") but are secretly employed by Tommy to distract him; Mahi attempts to seduce Jack ("Friki-Friki"), but fails. Betsy gets along well with Tommy and his son's family, unaware that they are hired actors. She shares a tender moment with Tommy as they sing an old standard together ("You Made the Wait Worthwhile"). Betsy refrains from being intimate with him, but Tommy confides in his henchman Johnny Sandwich that he still thinks his plan will be successful ("A Little Luck"). Meanwhile, Mahi is moved by Jack's plight and takes him to a sacred grove where a mother's curse can be broken ("The Garden of Disappointed Mothers"). Jack confronts his mother ("Isn't That Enough?"), who relents and agrees to let him and Betsy be happy—but only if Jack proves himself as a man. Tommy plies Betsy with drinks and tells her that Jack only owed him $800; she is so outraged (and drunk) that she kisses Tommy and demands that he immediately marry her in Las Vegas. Mahi informs Jack that Tommy and Betsy are leaving Hawaii, but he is unable to catch them. No reasonable travel options are available ("Airport Song"), but Jack manages to join a troupe of Elvis impersonators making a "pilgrimage" to Las Vegas. However, when the plane approaches Las Vegas, he learns that he must skydive into the city ("Higher Love"). He panics, but ultimately makes the jump, thus proving himself ("Elvii In Flight"). Betsy, having sobered up, rethinks her decision ("I've Been Thinking"), and finally rejects Tommy after Johnny accidentally confirms the true amount of Jack's debt. Jack parachutes into Betsy's arms and they marry on the spot ("Honeymoon in Vegas (Finale)")

== Musical numbers ==
Act I

- "Overture" – Orchestra
- "I Love Betsy" – Jack and Ensemble
- "Never Get Married" – Bea and Ensemble
- "Anywhere But Here" – Betsy
- "When You Say Vegas" – Buddy Rocky and Ensemble
- "Out of the Sun" – Tommy
- "The Invitation" – Tommy
- "Forever Starts Tonight" – Jack and Tommy
- "Betsy's Getting Married" – Betsy, Ensemble
- "The Game" – Jack, Tommy, Betsy, Ensemble
- "Come to an Agreement" – Tommy
- "Do Something" – Buddy Rocky, Jack, and Ensemble

Act II

- "Entr'acte" – Orchestra
- "Hawaii/Waiting For You" – Raymond, Betsy, Jack, and Ensemble
- "Ev'ryday is Happy in Hawaii" – Jack, Teihutu and Mahi
- "Friki-Friki" – Mahi and Jack
- "You Made the Wait Worthwhile" – Tommy, Betsy, and Ensemble
- "A Little Luck" – Tommy and Johnny
- "Isn't That Enough?" – Jack, Mahi, and Bea
- "Airport Song" – Ticket Agents
- "Higher Love" – Roy Bacon and Ensemble
- "Elvii In Flight" - Jack, Ensemble, and Tommy
- "I've Been Thinking" – Betsy and Tommy
- "Honeymoon in Vegas/Finale" – Jack, Betsy, Roy Bacon, Bea, and Ensemble

== Critical response ==
Marilyn Stasio, reviewing for Variety, wrote that the set of Anna Louizos was "garishly witty" and noted the "breezy score (a tribute to the art of finger-snapping) and the brassy swing styling of the fantastic onstage band under Tom Murray's enthusiastic direction." However, she mentioned the "dated feel to the farcical plot", concluding "The show seems to have been rushed to Broadway a bit prematurely, since some rather obvious bald spots in the second act still need work,... Happily, there’s no time for snoozing once Roy Bacon (the invaluable Josefsberg again), the world's funniest Elvis impersonator, and a singing chorus of brilliantly costumed Flying Elvises show up to rescue Jack — and the show."

Ben Brantley, in his review for The New York Times, called the musical "bright and bouncy", "a real-live, old-fashioned, deeply satisfying Broadway musical in a way few new shows are anymore." Of Brown's score, he wrote: "His songs seamlessly propel plot and define character in the way numbers did in the heyday of Rodgers and Hammerstein."

Other reviews were less kind. In The Guardian, Alexis Soloski wrote, "You’d expect a Vegas-set show to be all glitz and glitter, but there’s something a little low-rent about Honeymoon, which stints on sets, on dance numbers and (until the finale) even on sequins. Are there really only two showgirls? … It’s all in the service of a story that’s often uninvolving and sometimes a little distasteful." David Rooney wrote in The Hollywood Reporter, "this is a 2½-hour musical with maybe 90 minutes’ worth of decent material. Its frothiness is initially enjoyable until it becomes silly and then tiresome, before sparking back to life toward the end. Ultimately, the show feels slight. Much of the most infectious stuff comes from composer-lyricist Jason Robert Brown, whose talent as a songsmith is sharper than his nose for a winning property."

== Awards and honors ==
=== Original Broadway production ===
Year	Award	Category	Nominee	Result
2015	Drama Desk Award	Outstanding Featured Actress in a Musical	Nancy Opel	Nominated
2015	Drama Desk Award	Outstanding Music	Jason Robert Brown	Nominated
2015	Drama Desk Award	Outstanding Lyrics	Jason Robert Brown	Nominated
2015	Drama Desk Award	Outstanding Orchestrations	Jason Robert Brown, Don Sebesky, Larry Blank, and Charlie Rosen	Nominated
2015	Drama Desk Award	Outstanding Sound Design in a Musical	Drew Levy and Scott Lehrer	Nominated
2015	Drama League Award	Distinguished Performance	Rob McClure	Nominated
