= Chu Chem =

1966 American musical stage play

- Music: Mitch Leigh
- Lyrics: Jim Haines; Jack Wohl
- Book: Ted Allen
- Productions: 1966 Philadelphia; 1989 Broadway

Chu Chem is a musical with a book by Ted Allen, lyrics by Jim Haines and Jack Wohl, and music by Mitch Leigh.

== Background ==
Allen's inspiration was a trip to Kaifeng Fu (prefecture), China, the site of a major Jewish migration in the 10th century (see Kaifeng Jews). Around this subject matter he devised a play-within-a-play with an intricate plot involving a group of Occidental actors who join a troupe of Chinese performers to present the title character's story. Chu Chem is a scholar who, with his wife Rose and daughter Lotte, journeys to Kaifeng Fu to learn about his ancestors and find a husband for the young woman. Prince Eagle suggests she become one of his concubines, a proposal she finds distasteful. Eventually he abdicates his throne for the woman he loves, and Chu Chem discovers the Jews became so assimilated into their new homeland that no traces of them are to be found.

== Productions ==
The production's designs attempted to imitate traditional Chinese theatre, ironically with sumo wrestlers (one the son of Man Mountain Dean) grappling onstage during intermission to entertain the audience. Director Albert Marre cast Yiddish theatre stars Menasha Skulnik and Molly Picon as Chu Chem and Rose, Marcia Rodd as Lotte, and James Shigeta as Prince Eagle. Other cast members included Yuki Shimoda, Robert Ito, Reiko Sato, Alvin Ing, Haruki Fujimoto, as well as choreographer Jack Cole who took on the role of Mongol Lord Hoo Hah.

During rehearsals Picon, upset that her role had been reduced, walked out, but eventually returned. The November 1966 tryout at the New Locust Theatre in Philadelphia was plagued by constant revisions to the script and score, and an unhappy Picon quit permanently. At one point on opening night, her successor Henrietta Jacobson turned to the audience and announced, "There was a song here, but you'll be better off without it." The reviews were brutal, with one critic describing it "like blintzes and soy sauce" and suggesting "a better title might be The King and Oy." Co-producers Leigh and Cheryl Crawford immediately cancelled the scheduled Broadway opening at the George Abbott Theatre.

Unwilling to leave well enough alone, Allen and Leigh decided to revive the show 22 years later at the Jewish Repertory Theatre in Manhattan. The greatly revamped version eliminated the play-within-a-play concept and the role of Rose, placed greater emphasis on the romance between Lotte and the prince, and revised the score. Encouraged by a favorable review from the third-string New York Times critic, the creative team decided to move it uptown.

The Broadway production, directed and choreographed by Albert Marre, opened on March 17, 1989 at the Ritz Theatre where, hampered by a no-name cast (Emily Zacharias as Lotte, Mark Zeller as Chu Chem, and Thom Sesma as the prince) and poor-to-dreadful reviews, it ran for only 68 performances, continuing for two months at heavy losses in the hope it would garner some Tony Award nominations in a season beset by bad musicals (Carrie, Legs Diamond). When it was shut out, the production closed, a two-time flop in musical theatre history.

== Song list ==
Act I

- Orient Yourself
- What Happened, What?
- Welcome
- You'll Have to Change
- Love Is
- I'll Talk to Her
- Shame on You
- It Must Be Good for Me
- I'll Talk to Her (Reprise)
- You'll Have to Change (Reprise)
- The River
- We Dwell in Our Hearts
- Goodbye Love, Goodbye

Act II

- Re-Orient Yourself
- What Happened, What? (Reprise)
- I Once Believed
- It's Possible
- Our Kind of War
- Boom!
