= Pacific Overtures =

1976 musical by Stephen Sondheim and John Weidman

- Artwork for the original Broadway cast recording
- Music: Stephen Sondheim
- Lyrics: Stephen Sondheim
- Book: John Weidman
- Productions: 1976 Broadway; 1984 Off-Broadway; 1987 English National Opera; 2003 West End; 2004 Broadway revival 2014 Off-West End; 2017 Off-Broadway revival 2023 Off-West End revival

Pacific Overtures is a musical with music and lyrics by Stephen Sondheim, and a book by John Weidman, with "additional material by" Hugh Wheeler.

Set in nineteenth-century Japan, it tells the story of the country's westernization starting in 1853, when American ships forcibly opened it to the rest of the world. The story is told from the point of view of the Japanese, and focuses in particular on the lives of two friends who are caught in the change.

Sondheim wrote the score in a quasi-Japanese musical style of parallel 4ths and no leading-tone. He did not use the pentatonic scale; the 4th degree of the major scale is represented from the opening number through the finale, as Sondheim found just five pitches too limiting. The music contrasts Japanese contemplation ("There Is No Other Way") with Western ingenuousness ("Please Hello"), while over the course of the 127 years Western harmonies, tonality, and even lyrics are infused into the score. The score is generally considered to be one of Sondheim's most ambitious and sophisticated efforts.

The original Broadway production of Pacific Overtures in 1976 was staged in Kabuki theatre form, with men playing women's parts and set changes made in full view of the audience by black-clad stagehands. The show opened to mixed reviews and closed after six months, despite being nominated for ten Tony Awards.

Given its specific casting and production demands, Pacific Overtures remains one of Stephen Sondheim's least-performed musicals. The show is occasionally staged by opera companies. The cast requires an abundance of male Asian actors who must play male and female parts. As written, women join the ensemble for only half of the last song; all other principal female roles are played by men, as was traditional in Kabuki theatre. In the original production the five female cast members appeared throughout the show in small roles and as stagehands, and more recent productions, including the 2004 Broadway revival, did away with the device of men playing the majority of the women's roles.

The most recent U.S. revival in 2017 at Classic Stage Company (CSC), directed by John Doyle and starring George Takei as The Reciter, featured a cast of only 10 people: 8 men and 2 women. This Off-Broadway production was also notable for featuring a revised book by John Weidman with a reduced running time of 90 minutes (versus the 2 hour 30 minute original run time).

== Title ==
The title of the work is drawn directly from text in a letter from Admiral Perry addressed to the Emperor dated July 7, 1853:

Many of the large ships-of-war destined to visit Japan have not yet arrived in these seas, though they are hourly expected; and the undersigned, as an evidence of his friendly intentions, has brought but four of the smaller ones, designing, should it become necessary, to return to Edo in the ensuing spring with a much larger force.

But it is expected that the government of your imperial majesty will render such return unnecessary, by acceding at once to the very reasonable and pacific overtures contained in the President's letter, and which will be further explained by the undersigned on the first fitting occasion.

In addition to playing on the musical term "overture" and the geographical reference to the Pacific Ocean there is also the irony, revealed as the story unfolds, that these "pacific overtures" to initiate commercial exploitation of the Pacific nation were backed by a none too subtle threat of force.

== Productions ==
Pacific Overtures previewed in Boston and ran at The Kennedy Center for a month before opening on Broadway at the Winter Garden Theatre on January 11, 1976. It closed after 193 performances on June 27, 1976. Directed by Harold Prince, the choreography was by Patricia Birch, scenic design by Boris Aronson, costume design by Florence Klotz, and lighting design by Tharon Musser. The original cast recording was released originally by RCA Records and later on CD. This production was nominated for 10 Tony Awards, and won Best Scenic Design (Boris Aronson) and Best Costume Design (Florence Klotz). The original Broadway production was filmed and broadcast on Japanese television in 1976.

Mako later directed and reprised his role of the Reciter in a 1979 production at the East West Players in Los Angeles. The production featured multiple members of the original Broadway cast reprising their roles, including Sab Shimono, Ernest Harada, and Alvin Ing, with Soon-tek Oh taking on the role of Kayama. A young John Lone performed in the production as Commodore Perry. The musical was produced again by East West Players in 1998 as the inaugural performance at the David Henry Hwang Theater. East West Players staged Pacific Overtures for a third time in November 2024, led by Jon Jon Briones and Gedde Watanabe, who was part of the original Broadway production.

An Off-Broadway production ran at the Promenade Theatre from October 25, 1984 for 109 performances, transferring from an earlier production at the York Theatre Company. Directed by Fran Soeder with choreography by Janet Watson, the cast featured Ernest Abuba and Kevin Gray.

The European premiere was directed by Howard Lloyd-Lewis (Library Theatre, Manchester) at Wythenshawe Forum in 1986 with choreography by Paul Kerryson who subsequently directed the show in 1993 at Leicester Haymarket Theatre. Both productions featured Mitch Sebastian in the role of Commodore Perry.

A production was mounted in London by the English National Opera in 1987. The production was recorded in its entirety on CD, preserving nearly the entire libretto as well as the score. Unlike previous productions, this production featured a cast consisting primarily of Caucasian actors and opera singers.

A critically acclaimed 2001 Chicago Shakespeare Theater production, directed by Gary Griffin, transferred to the West End Donmar Warehouse, where it ran from June 30, 2003 until September 6, 2003 and received the 2004 Olivier Award for Outstanding Musical Production.

In 2002 the New National Theatre of Tokyo presented two limited engagements of their production, which was performed in Japanese with English supertitles. The production ran at Avery Fisher Hall, Lincoln Center from July 9, 2002 through July 13, and then at the Eisenhower Theater, Kennedy Center, from September 3, 2002, through September 8.

A Broadway revival by the Roundabout Theatre Company (an English-language mounting of the previous New National Theatre of Tokyo production) ran at Studio 54 from December 2, 2004, to January 30, 2005, directed by Amon Miyamoto and starring BD Wong as the Narrator and several members of the original cast. A new Broadway recording, with new (reduced) orchestrations by Jonathan Tunick was released by PS Classics, with additional material not included on the original cast album. The production was nominated for four Tony Awards, including Best Revival of a Musical. The orchestrations were "scaled back" for a 7-piece orchestra. Variety noted that "the heavy use of traditional lutes and percussion instruments like wood blocks, chimes and drums showcases the craftsmanship behind this distinctly Japanese-flavored score."

Classic Stage Company revived Pacific Overtures in 2017 for a limited Off-Broadway run, with a new abridged book by John Weidman, new orchestrations by Jonathan Tunick, directed by John Doyle, and starring George Takei as the Reciter. The production began previews April 6, 2017; after opening May 4, the show's run was twice extended, eventually closing June 18. Staged in one act, with a 10-member cast in modern-dress, the production excised both "Chrysanthemum Tea" and the instrumental "Lion Dance". The production earned recognition among the year's New York Times Critic's Picks, the Top 5 NY Theater Productions in Variety, and Top 10 NY Theater Productions in Hollywood Reporter. The show earned nominations from the Drama Desk, Drama League, Outer Critics Circle, and Lucille Lortel Awards.

In 2023, a co-production between the Umeda Arts Theater in Osaka, Japan, and the Menier Chocolate Factory in London used Sondheim and Weidman's revisions from 2017. Directed by Matthew White, the production played first in Japan, from March 8-29 at the Nissay Theatre in Tokyo, then from April 8-16 at the Umeda Arts Theater. The all-Japanese cast included Koji Yamamoto and Yuya Matsushita double cast as the Reciter, Eiji Wentz as Manjiro, and Hikaru Asami as the Shogun and Madam. This production next played with a London-based cast, including Takurō Ōno as Kayama and Masashi Fujimoto, at the Menier Chocolate Factory, from November 25, 2023 to February 24, 2024.

== Plot summary ==
Act I

Conceived as a Japanese playwright's version of an American musical about American influences on Japan, Pacific Overtures opens in July 1853. As traditional Japanese music plays, the Reciter is revealed on stage. Since foreigners were expelled from the island empire two hundred and fifty years previously, explains the Reciter, elsewhere wars are fought and machines are rumbling, but in Nippon they paint screens, plant rice, exchange bows, and enjoy peace and serenity, and there has been nothing to threaten the changeless cycle of their days ("The Advantages of Floating in the Middle of the Sea"). However, unknown to the Nipponese, President Millard Fillmore, determined to open up trade with Japan, has sent Commodore Matthew C. Perry and a fleet of four warships across the Pacific.

To the consternation of Lord Abe and the Shogun's other Councillors, the stirrings of trouble begin with the appearance of Manjiro, a fisherman who had been lost at sea and rescued by Americans. He has returned to Japan and now attempts to warn the authorities of the approaching warships, but is instead arrested for consorting with foreigners. A minor samurai, Kayama Yezaemon, is appointed Prefect of Police at Uraga to drive the Americans away - news which leaves his wife Tamate grief-stricken, since Kayama will certainly fail and both will then have to commit seppuku. As he leaves, she expresses her feelings in dance as two Observers describe the scene and sing her thoughts and words ("There Is No Other Way"). As a Fisherman, a Thief, and other locals relate the sight of the "Four Black Dragons" roaring through the sea, an extravagant Oriental caricature of the USS Powhatan pulls into harbor. Kayama is sent out in a boat to meet with the Americans but he is laughed at and rejected as not being important enough. He enlists the aid of Manjiro, the only man in Japan who has dealt with Americans; disguised as a great lord and speaking arrogantly, Manjiro is able to get an answer from them: Commodore Perry must meet the Shogun within six days or else he will shell the city. Facing this ultimatum, the Shogun refuses to commit himself to an answer and takes to his bed. Exasperated by his indecision and continued procrastination, his Mother, with elaborate courtesy, slowly poisons him. ("Chrysanthemum Tea").

Kayama devises a plan by which the Americans can be received without technically setting foot on Japanese soil, thanks to a covering of tatami mats and a raised Treaty House in a small cove in Kanagawa, for which he is made Governor of Uraga. He and Manjiro set off for Uraga, forging a bond of friendship through the exchange of "Poems". Kayama has saved Japan, but it is too late to save Tamate: when Kayama arrives at his home, he finds that she is dead, having committed seppuku after having received no news of Kayama for many days. Already events are moving beyond the control of the old order: the two men pass a Madam instructing her inexperienced Oiran girls in the art of seduction as they prepare for the arrival of the foreign devils ("Welcome to Kanagawa").

Commodore Perry and his men disembark and, on their "March to the Treaty House", demonstrate their goodwill by offering such gifts as two bags of Irish potatoes and a copy of Owen's "Geology of Minnesota", gifts that make the Nipponese reciprocal gifts seem insignificant. The negotiations themselves are observed through the memories of three who were there: a warrior hidden beneath the floor of the Treaty House who could hear the debates, a young boy who could see the action from his perch in the tree outside, and the boy as an old man recalling that without "Someone In a Tree", a silent watcher, history is incomplete. Initially, it seems as if Kayama and the Nipponese have won; the Americans depart in peace. But the barbarian figure of Commodore Perry leaps out to perform a traditional Kabuki "Lion Dance", which ends as a strutting, triumphalist, all-American cakewalk.

Act II

The child emperor (portrayed by a puppet manipulated by his advisors) reacts with pleasure to the departure of the Americans, promoting Lord Abe to Shogun, confirming Kayama as Governor of Uraga and raising Manjiro to the rank of Samurai. The crisis appears to have passed, but to the displeasure of Lord Abe the Americans return to request formal trading arrangements. To the tune of a Sousa march, an American ambassador bids "Please Hello" to Japan and is followed by a Gilbertian British ambassador, a clog-dancing Dutchman, a gloomy Russian (quipping, "Don't touch the coat"), and a dandified Frenchman all vying for access to Japan's markets. With the appearance of this new group of westerners, the faction of the Lords of the South grow restless. They send a politically charged gift to the Emperor, a storyteller who tells a vivid, allegorical tale of a brave young emperor who frees himself from his cowardly Shogun.

Fifteen years pass as Kayama and Manjiro dress themselves for tea. As Manjiro continues to dress in traditional robes for the tea ceremony, Kayama gradually adopts the manners, culture and dress of the newcomers, proudly displaying a new pocket watch, cutaway coat and "A Bowler Hat". Although Kayama, as stated in his reports to the Shogun, manages to reach an "understanding" with the Western merchants and diplomats, tensions abound between the Japanese and the "barbarians". Three British sailors on shore leave mistake the daughter of a samurai for a geisha and climb over the garden wall to speak to her. Though their approach is initially gentle ("Pretty Lady"), they grow more persistent to the point where they offer her money; the girl cries for help and her father kills one of the confused sailors while the others flee. Kayama and Abe travel to the Emperor's court discussing the situation and its political repercussions. While on the road, their party is attacked by cloaked assassins sent by the Lords of the South and Abe is assassinated. Most of the assassins are cut down by Abe's bodyguard, but he himself is killed by the sole remaining assassin. Kayama is horrified to discover that the remaining assassin is his former friend Manjiro; they fight and Kayama is killed.

In the ensuing turmoil, the puppet Emperor seizes real power and vows that Japan will modernize itself. As the country moves from one innovation to the "Next!", the Imperial robes are removed layer by layer to show the Reciter in 19th century Western military dress. Contemporary Japan - the country of Toyota, Seiko, air and water pollution and market domination - assembles itself around him and its accomplishments are extolled. "Nippon. The Floating Kingdom. There was a time when foreigners were not welcome here. But that was long ago..." says the Reciter, now in modern dress: "Welcome to Japan."

== Original Broadway cast — characters ==
- Mako — Reciter, Shogun, Jonathan Goble, Emperor Meiji
- Soon-Tek Oh — Tamate, Samurai, Storyteller, Swordsman
- Isao Sato — Kayama
- Yuki Shimoda — Lord Abe
- Sab Shimono — Manjiro
- Ernest Abuba — Samurai, Adams, Noble
- James Dybas — Councillor, Old Man, French Admiral
- Timm Fujii — Son, Priest, Kanagawa Girl, Noble, British Sailor
- Haruki Fujimoto — Servant, Commodore Matthew Calbraith Perry
- Larry Hama — Williams, Lord of the South, Gangster
- Ernest Harada — Physician, Madam, British Admiral
- Alvin Ing — Shogun's Mother, Observer, Merchant, American Admiral
- Patrick Kinser-Lau — Shogun's Companion, Kanagawa Girl, Dutch Admiral, British Sailor
- Jae Woo Lee — Fisherman, Sumo Wrestler, Lord of the South
- Freddy Mao — Councillor, Samurai's Daughter
- Tom Matsusaka — Imperial Priest
- Freda Foh Shen — Shogun's Wife
- Mark Hsu Syers — Samurai, Thief, Soothsayer, Warrior, Russian Admiral, British Sailor
- Ricardo Tobia — Observer
- Gedde Watanabe — Priest, Kanagawa Girl, The Boy
- Conrad Yama — Grandmother, Sumo Wrestler, Japanese Merchant
- Fusako Yoshida — Shamisen accompaniment

Proscenium Servants, Sailors and Townspeople: Kenneth S. Eiland, Timm Fujii, Joey Ginza, Patrick Kinser-Lau, Diane Lam, Tony Marinyo, Kevin Maung, Kim Miyori, Dingo Secretario, Freda Foh Shen, Mark Hsu Seyers, Gedde Watanabe, Leslie Watanabe, Ricardo Tobia

== 1984 Off-Broadway revival cast — characters ==
- Ernest Abuba — Reciter
- Tony Marino — Lord Abe, Second Officer
- Thomas Ikeda — Third Councillor, Merchant's Mother, Physician, Madam, Russian Admiral
- Chuck Brown — Shogun's Mother, Old Samurai With Mask, British Admiral
- Tom Matsusaka — Second Councillor, Imperial Priest, Fencing Master
- Kevin Gray — Kayama Yesaemon
- Timm Fujii — Tamate, Shogun's Wife, British Sailor
- John Baray — Observer/Sumo Wrestler/Old Man/American Admiral
- Tim Ewing — Observer, Thief, Shogun's Companion
- John Caleb — Fisherman, John Manjiro, French Admiral
- Ronald Yamamoto — Merchant, First Officer, Sumo Wrestler, Kanagawa Girl
- John Bantay — Merchant's Son, Commodore Perry, Kanagawa Girl
- Ray Contreras — Soothsayer, Warrior, British Sailor
- Allen Tung — Priest, Kanagawa Girl, Fencing Master's Daughter
- Francis Jue — Priest, Kanagawa Girl, Boy, Dutch Admiral, British Sailor

Proscenium Servants: Gerri Igarashi, Gayln Kong, Diane Lam, Christine Toy

== 2004 Broadway revival cast — characters ==
- BD Wong - Reciter
- Evan D'Angeles - Observer, Warrior, Officer, British Admiral
- Joseph Anthony Foronda - Thief, Soothsayer, Samurai, Storyteller
- Yoko Fumoto - Tamate
- Alvin Ing - Shogun's Mother, Old Man
- Fred Isozaki - Noble
- Francis Jue - Madam, Dutch Admiral
- Darren Lee - American Admiral, Sailor, Officer
- Hoon Lee - Sailor, Merchant, Commodore Matthew Calbraith Perry, Lord of the South
- Michael K. Lee - Kayama
- Ming Lee - Councilor, Priest, Emperor Priest
- Telly Leung - Boy, Observer, Sailor, Shogun's Companion, Noble
- Paolo Montalban - Manjiro
- Alan Muraoka - Councilor, Grandmother (Muraoka also understudied the Dutch Admiral and performs the role in the 2004 cast recording)
- Mayumi Omagari - Kanagawa Girl, Daughter
- Daniel Jay Park - Priest, Kanagawa Girl, French Admiral
- Hazel Anne Raymundo - Shogun's Wife, Kanagawa Girl
- Sab Shimono - Lord Abe
- Yuka Takara - Son, Shogun's Wife's Servant, Kanagawa Girl
- Scott Watanabe - Fisherman, Russian Admiral, Older Swordsman, Physician, Samurai Bodyguard

== 2017 Off-Broadway revival cast — characters ==
- George Takei - Reciter
- Karl Josef Co - Fisherman, American Admiral, First Sailor
- Steven Eng - Kayama
- Megan Masako Haley - Tamate
- Ann Harada - Madam, French Admiral
- Austin Ku - Boy, British Admiral, Third Sailor
- Kelvin Moon Loh - Warrior, Russian Admiral, Second Sailor
- Orville Mendoza - Manjiro
- Marc Oka - Thief, Dutch Admiral
- Thom Sesma - Lord Abe, Old Man

== Musical numbers ==
Act One

- Prologue — Orchestra
- The Advantages of Floating in the Middle of the Sea — Reciter and Company
- There Is No Other Way — Tamate, Observers
- Four Black Dragons — Fisherman, Thief, Reciter, Townspeople
- Chrysanthemum Tea — Shogun, Shogun's Mother, Shogun's Wife, Soothsayer, Priests, Shogun's Companion, Physician, Sumo Wrestlers
- Poems — Kayama, Manjiro
- Welcome to Kanagawa — Madam and Girls
- March to the Treaty House — Orchestra
- Someone in a Tree — Old Man, Reciter, Boy, Warrior
- Lion Dance — Commodore Perry

Act Two

- Please Hello — Abe, Reciter, American, British, Dutch, Russian and French Admirals
- A Bowler Hat — Kayama
- Pretty Lady — Three British Sailors
- Next — Reciter and Company

== Critical response and analysis ==
"Someone in a Tree" features a boy witnessing the negotiations between the Japanese and Americans, while that same boy as an old man bickers with his younger self over details. The simultaneous existence of the past and present together and in conflict ("I was there, then / I am here, still") made this Sondheim's favorite song out of everything he had written. "A Bowler Hat" presents the show's theme, as a samurai gradually becomes more Westernized and progressively adopts the habits and affectations of the foreigners he is meant to supervise. “Pretty Lady” is a contrapuntal trio of three British sailors who have mistaken a young girl for a geisha and are attempting to woo her. This is, perhaps, the musical fusion highlight of the show as the orchestra and lays descending parallel 4ths and the singers use a counterpoint form established during the Western Renaissance; again the chord progression is often IV to I, again eschewing Pentatonics.

The New York Times review of the original 1976 production said "The lyrics are totally Western and—as is the custom with Mr. Sondheim—devilish, wittily and delightfully clever. Mr. Sondheim is the most remarkable man in the Broadway musical today—and here he shows it victoriously ... Mr. Prince's staging uses all the familiar Kabuki tricks—often with voices screeching in the air like lonely sea birds—and stylizations with screens and things, and stagehands all masked in black to make them invisible to the audience. Like choreography, the direction is designed to meld Kabuki with Western forms ... the attempt is so bold and the achievement so fascinating, that its obvious faults demand to be overlooked. It tries to soar—sometimes it only floats, sometimes it actually sinks—but it tries to soar. And the music and lyrics are as pretty and as well-formed as a bonsai tree. Pacific Overtures is very, very different."

Walter Kerr's article in The New York Times on the original 1976 production said "But no amount of performing, or of incidental charm, can salvage Pacific Overtures. The occasion is essentially dull and immobile because we are never properly placed in it, drawn neither East nor West, given no specific emotional or cultural bearings." Ruth Mitchell, assistant to Mr. Prince, said in an interview with WPIX that a sense of not belonging was intentional as that was the very point of the show.

Frank Rich, reviewing the 1984 revival for The New York Times stated that "the show attempts an ironic marriage of Broadway and Oriental idioms in its staging, its storytelling techniques and, most of all, in its haunting Stephen Sondheim songs. It's a shotgun marriage, to be sure - with results that are variously sophisticated and simplistic, beautiful and vulgar. But if Pacific Overtures is never going to be anyone's favorite Sondheim musical, it is a far more forceful and enjoyable evening at the Promenade than it was eight years ago at the Winter Garden...Many of the songs are brilliant, self-contained playlets. In Four Black Dragons various peasants describe the arrival of the American ships with escalating panic, until finally the nightmarish event does seem to be, as claimed, the end of the world ... 'Someone in a Tree', is a compact Rashomon — and as fine as anything Mr. Sondheim has written ...The single Act II triumph, 'Bowler Hat', could well be a V. S. Naipaul tale set to music and illustrated with spare Japanese brushstrokes ... 'Bowler Hat' delivers the point of Pacific Overtures so artfully that the rest of Act II seems superfluous."

The 2004 production was not as well received. It was based on a critically praised Japanese language production by director Amon Miyamoto. Ben Brantley, reviewing for The New York Times, wrote: "Now Mr. Miyamoto and Pacific Overtures have returned with an English-speaking, predominantly Asian-American cast, which makes distracting supertitles unnecessary. The show's sets, costumes and governing concept remain more or less the same. Yet unlike the New National Theater of Tokyo production, which was remarkable for its conviction and cohesiveness, this latest incarnation from the Roundabout Theater Company has the bleary, disoriented quality of someone suffering from jet lag after a sleepless trans-Pacific flight. Something has definitely been lost in the retranslation." Of the cast, Brantley wrote, "Even as they sing sweetly and smile engagingly, they appear to be asking themselves, 'What am I doing here?'"

== Awards and nominations ==
=== Original Broadway production ===
Year	Award	Category	Nominee	Result
1976	Tony Awards	Best Musical		Nominated
1976	Tony Awards	Best Book of a Musical	John Weidman	Nominated
1976	Tony Awards	Best Original Score	Stephen Sondheim	Nominated
1976	Tony Awards	Best Performance by a Leading Actor in a Musical	Mako	Nominated
1976	Tony Awards	Best Performance by a Featured Actor in a Musical	Isao Sato	Nominated
1976	Tony Awards	Best Direction of a Musical	Harold Prince	Nominated
1976	Tony Awards	Best Choreography	Patricia Birch	Nominated
1976	Tony Awards	Best Scenic Design	Boris Aronson	Won
1976	Tony Awards	Best Costume Design	Florence Klotz	Won
1976	Tony Awards	Best Lighting Design	Tharon Musser	Nominated
1976	Drama Desk Awards	Outstanding Musical		Nominated
1976	Drama Desk Awards	Outstanding Book of a Musical	John Weidman	Nominated
1976	Drama Desk Awards	Outstanding Featured Actor in a Musical	Haruki Fujimoto	Nominated
1976	Drama Desk Awards	Outstanding Director of a Musical	Harold Prince	Nominated
1976	Drama Desk Awards	Outstanding Choreography	Patricia Birch	Nominated
1976	Drama Desk Awards	Outstanding Music and Lyrics	Stephen Sondheim	Nominated
1976	Drama Desk Awards	Outstanding Set Design	Boris Aronson	Won
1976	Drama Desk Awards	Outstanding Costume Design	Florence Klotz	Won
1976	New York Drama Critics' Circle Award	Best Musical	Stephen Sondheim, John Weidman and Hugh Wheeler	Won

=== 2003 West End Revival ===
Year	Award	Category	Nominee	Result
2004	Laurence Olivier Awards	Outstanding Musical Production	Pacific Overtures	Won
2004	Laurence Olivier Awards	Best Performance in a Supporting Role in a Musical	Richard Henders	Nominated
2004	Laurence Olivier Awards	Best Performance in a Supporting Role in a Musical	Jérôme Pradon	Nominated
2004	Laurence Olivier Awards	Best Director	Gary Griffin	Nominated
2004	Laurence Olivier Awards	Best Theatre Choreographer	Karen Bruce	Won
2004	Laurence Olivier Awards	Best Costume Design	Mara Blumenfeld	Nominated
2004	Laurence Olivier Awards	Best Lighting Design	Hugh Vanstone	Won
2004	Laurence Olivier Awards	Best Sound Design	Nick Lidster	Nominated

=== 2004 Broadway revival ===
Year	Award	Category	Nominee	Result
2005	Tony Awards	Best Revival of a Musical		Nominated
2005	Tony Awards	Best Orchestrations	Jonathan Tunick	Nominated
2005	Tony Awards	Best Scenic Design	Rumi Matsui	Nominated
2005	Tony Awards	Best Costume Design	Junko Koshino	Nominated

=== 2017 Off-Broadway revival ===
Year	Award	Category	Nominee	Result
2018	Drama Desk Awards	Outstanding Revival of a Musical		Nominated
2018	Drama Desk Awards	Outstanding Orchestrations	Jonathan Tunick	Nominated
2018	Drama Desk Awards	Outstanding Sound Design in a Musical	Dan Moses Schreier	Nominated
2018	Outer Critics Circle Awards	Outstanding Revival of a Musical		Nominated
2018	Drama League Awards	Outstanding Revival of a Musical		Nominated
2018	Lucille Lortel Awards	Outstanding Lead Actor in a Musical	Steven Eng	Nominated
2018	Lucille Lortel Awards	Outstanding Featured Actor in a Musical	Thom Sesma	Nominated

== See also ==
- Black ships
