= Edison High School (Stockton, California) =

Location
- 100 W. Dr. Martin Luther King Blvd; Stockton 95206, California; United States

Information
- Type: Public
- Established: 1941
- School district: Stockton Unified School District
- Principal: Justin Gann
- Teaching staff: 100.36 (FTE)
- Enrollment: 2,414 (2023–2024)
- Student to teacher ratio: 24.05
- Colors: Maroon and Gold
- Mascot: Viking
- Rival: Franklin High School
- Website: edison.stocktonusd.net

Edison High School is a secondary school located in the southern part of Stockton, California. It is in the Stockton Unified School District.

== History ==
Opening in 1941, the school is located in a dense urban area in the southern part of Stockton. Edison High School opened in 1941 at what is now the corner of Charter Way, now called Martin Luther King Jr. Blvd, and Center Street. It is named after the American Inventor Thomas Edison. The campus has been expanded through the years, with the addition of major classroom buildings and a library in the 1970s. Starting with the 2009–2010 school year, Edison will start its classes as Small Learning Communities or SLC's.

== Athletics ==
The Vikings compete at Division 1 level in the CIF. They are a member of the San Joaquin Athletic Association and part of the Sac-Joaquin Section.

== Notable alumni ==
- Darren Arbet, arena football, current head coach of the San Jose Sabercats and 4-time Arena Bowl champion
- Nakia Burrise, American Actress most known for her role as Tanya Sloan, the Yellow Zeo Ranger in Power Rangers Zeo and the first Yellow Turbo Ranger in Power Rangers Turbo. She attended UCLA after graduating from Edison.
- Dennis Edwards, former defensive end for the Los Angeles Rams
- John Gianelli, former forward/center for the New York Knicks (1972–1976), Buffalo Braves (1976–1977), Milwaukee Bucks (1977–1979) and Utah Jazz (1979)
- Lynell Hamilton, former running back for the New Orleans Saints.
- Willard Harrell, former running back for the Green Bay Packers and St. Louis Cardinals.
- Lavelle Hawkins, current wide receiver for the Tampa Bay Buccaneers.
- Chris Henry, running back for NFL's Tennessee Titans, Houston Texans and Seattle Seahawks.
- Fred Heron, former defensive lineman for the St. Louis Cardinals.
- J. D. Hill, former wide receiver for the Buffalo Bills and Detroit Lions of the National Football League.
- Trumaine Johnson, former cornerback for the New York Jets.
- Derek Kennard, former guard and center for the National Football League and United States Football League.
- Maxine Hong Kingston, wrote The Woman Warrior: Memoirs of a Girlhood Among Ghosts
- Patrick Kinser-Lau, Broadway actor
- Dawn Mabalon, historian and professor
- John Nisby, former NFL guard with the Pittsburgh Steelers and Washington Redskins. One of the first African American players to play for the Washington Redskins.
- Saint Saffold, football player
- Devan Thompkins, college football defensive tackle for the USC Trojans
