= Diego Andres Rodriguez =

American actor and singer

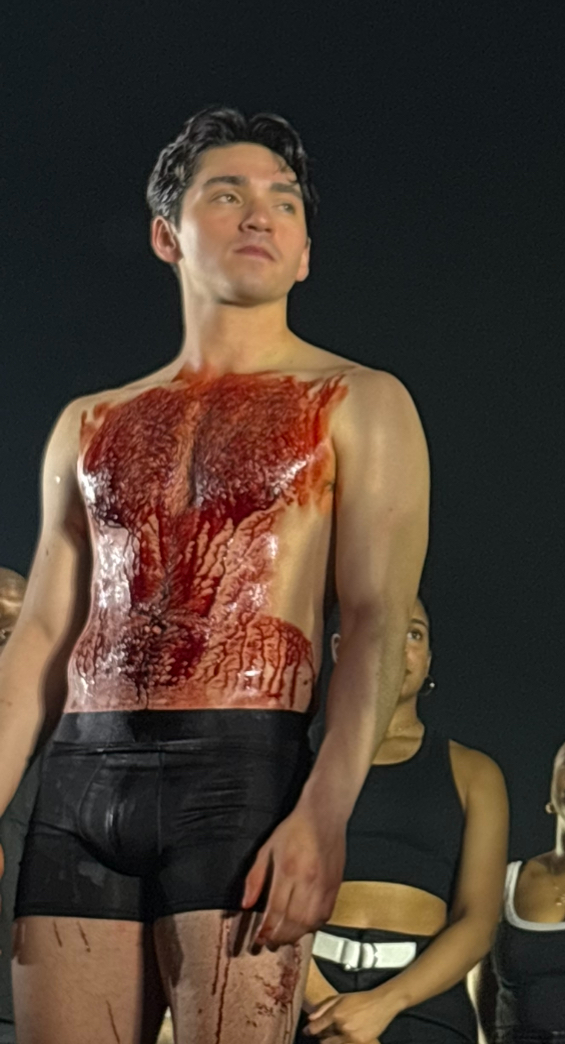
- Rodriguez in Sunset Boulevard, 2025
- Born: Diego Andres Rodriguez
- Education: University of Michigan (BFA)
- Occupations: Actor and singer
- Years active: 2024–present

Diego Andres Rodriguez is an American actor and singer known for his portrayal of Che in the 2025 West End production of Evita, for which he was nominated for the Laurence Olivier Award for Best Actor in a Musical.

== Early life ==
Rodriguez grew up in McAllen, Texas, and attended the University of Michigan. He was runner-up for The Gary Garrison National Ten-Minute Play Award at the 2024 Kennedy Center American College Theater Festival Awards for his play No Me Sueltes.

== Career ==
Rodriguez made his Broadway debut as Artie Green in Jamie Lloyd’s Sunset Boulevard at the St. James Theatre, a production in which he also understudied the role of Joe Gillis. In 2025, he participated in a concert at Carnegie Hall of The Great War & The Great Gatsby. Later in 2025, he made his West End debut as Che in Jamie Lloyd’s revival of Evita.

== Theatre credits ==
Year	Production	Role	Theatre
2024–2025	Sunset Boulevard	Artie Green / Ensemble u/s Joe Gillis	St. James Theatre, Broadway
2025	Evita	Che	London Palladium, West End
2025	Roam	Pesha	Shaftesbury Theatre, West End
2026	Rebel Rebel	Boy	Ruhrtriennale, Bochum<ref>{{Cite web |title=Rebel Rebel at Jahrhunderthalle Bochum Germany (Aug 20 – Sep 3, 2026) |url=https:cite Playbill and IBDB. -->
