= Patrick Kinser-Lau =

Patrick Kinser-Lau (February 21, 1953 - October 26, 1983), sometimes called Patrick Kinser, was an American theater actor. He was born in California on February 21, 1953, to parents Nancy and Lloyd Kinser. He was a speech and drama major at Edison High School (Stockton, California). His broadway debut was in the original all-Asian cast of Pacific Overtures in 1976 where he played several roles: Dutch Admiral ("Please Hello"), the Shogun's Companion, one of the Kanagawa girls ("Welcome to Kanagawa") and a British Sailor ("Pretty Lady"). "Pretty Lady" is often included in Stephen Sondheim revues and tributes, such as Side by Side by Sondheim. Reviews for the show were mixed, and it closed after 6 months. After Pacific Overtures finished its West Coast tour, Kinser-Lau appeared off Broadway in The King and I. In 1978, he appeared in the revival of Stop the World – I Want to Get Off starring Sammy Davis Jr. His last Broadway appearance was in the short-lived Got Tu Go Disco in 1979. He later appeared in the ensemble of the 1981 National Tour of The King and I, starring Yul Brynner.

Kinser-Lau moved to Los Angeles in the early 1980s where he pursued a career as a screenwriter and worked with Christopher Gore on Fame.

He died in Santa Monica, California on October 26, 1983. He was 30 years old. His name can be found on block number 05401 of the NAMES Project AIDS Memorial Quilt, sponsored by the San Joaquin Aids Foundation.
