= Betty Loo Taylor =

American jazz musician (1929–2016)

Betty Loo Taylor (February 27, 1929 – December 21, 2016) was an American jazz pianist and musician, known as Hawaii's "First Lady of Jazz." She was the subject of the 2003 documentary, They Call Her Lady Fingers: The Betty Loo Taylor Story, by husband-and-wife filmmakers, Patricia Gillespie and Sam Polson.

Taylor was born on February 27, 1929, and showed a natural musical ability as a child. She moved from Hawaii to New York City in the 1940s, where she attended music school and became a pianist. She returned to Hawaii during the 1950s.

Taylor performed regularly at the Trappers club in Waikiki during the 1970s and 1980s, alongside her longtime musical partner, singer Jimmy Borges, who also died in 2016. She continued to perform at the Kahala Hotel & Resort on Oahu throughout the 1990s and 2000s.

In 2008, Taylor won a 2008 Na Hoku Hanohano Award for a jazz album she recorded with Joy Abbott. She also received praise for her arrangements and accompaniment of Alvin Ing on his 2010 CD, "Swing With Ing" which included Loo's nephew Steve playing bass. In 2012, she was also awarded Na Hoku Hanohano's lifetime achievement award.

Betty Loo Taylor died at Palolo Chinese Home in Honolulu on December 21, 2016, at age 87. Taylor, who was being treated for pneumonia at the time, had suffered a stroke approximately six months before her death.
