= Alvin Ing =

American singer and actor (1932–2021)

- Born: May 26, 1932; Honolulu, Hawaii, U.S.
- Died: July 31, 2021 (aged 89); Burbank, California, U.S.
- Education: University of Hawaii; Columbia University
- Occupations: Singer, actor

Alvin Y. F. Ing (May 26, 1932 – July 31, 2021) was an American singer and actor. His career included movies, television, musical theatre, and cabaret acts.

== Early life, family and education ==
Ing was born in Honolulu, Hawaii. He studied music at the University of Hawaii and at Columbia University in New York City. Ing served in the United States Army.

== Career ==
Ing was well associated with the musical Flower Drum Song by Rodgers and Hammerstein. He played the role of Wang Ta in numerous tours and stock productions, performing in the piece more than any other actor. Ing appeared in the musical Chu Chem in 1966, but the production closed before it reached Broadway. Prior to his Broadway career, Ing appeared in two Off-Broadway shows. Ing made his Broadway debut in Stephen Sondheim's Pacific Overtures in 1976. His performance in the original production of Pacific Overtures was also recorded and broadcast on Japanese television. Ing returned to Broadway in 2004 for a revival of the same show, playing one of his original parts, the Shogun's Mother. Due to his connection to Flower Drum Song, Ing was also a part of the 2002 Broadway revision, with additions by David Henry Hwang. In 1996, Ing appeared at the Singapore Repertory Theatre in the world premiere of the Dick Lee musical Sing to the Dawn, based upon the Minfong Ho book. Fellow cast members included Lee, June Angela, and Sala Iwamatsu. In October 2011, Ing took part in workshops and backers auditions for the musical adaptation of Honeymoon in Vegas, a piece which eventually reached Broadway in 2015. Ing performed on tours of Two Gentlemen of Verona, City of Angels, and the play adaptation of The World of Suzie Wong, as well as with regional companies such as East West Players, where he again played the Shogun's Mother in Pacific Overtures. Ing became a frequent actor in musicals at East West Players during the 1990s, also appearing in Sweeney Todd, Cabaret, Follies, and original works Canton Jazz Club and Beijing Spring.

Besides his musical theatre career, Ing performed on television and in film. Ing had recurring roles on the soap operas The Doctors and Falcon Crest, but also did numerous guest roles in shows such as Benson, How the West Was Won, Charlie's Angels, Quincy, M.E., All-American Girl, Dallas, Dynasty, Fantasy Island, Highway to Heaven , Law & Order: Criminal Intent, Marvel's Agents of S.H.I.E.L.D., and Hawaii Five-0 (2010 TV series). Movie credits include The Final Countdown, Stir Crazy, Troop Beverly Hills, Smilla's Sense of Snow, and in his largest movie role, Mr. Lee, a primary antagonist opposite Mark Wahlberg in The Gambler.

Ing's singing career included cabarets, benefit concerts, and an album released on CD, Swing with Ing, which he recorded with Betty Loo Taylor. Collaborating with Flower Drum Song revival cast member and Okinawan-born Yuka Takara, Ing performed numerous singing engagements as part of a yearly Broadway Night in Okinawa. In 2020, Ing released a second album digitally, Broadway is Still Calling featuring a collaboration with Takara. Ing also participated in The X Factor. In December 2018, Ing and dozens of other Asian American performers celebrated the 60th anniversary of Flower Drum Song by performing the opening number at the Broadway Cares/Equity Fights AIDS benefit, where over $6 million was raised.

Ing was active with the Theater for Asian American Performing Artists during the 1970s. The organization performed skits and revues, as well as protesting stereotypes as a way to advocate for Asian American performing opportunities. Ing was also an interview subject for a documentary about Flower Drum Song castmate Jack Soo and the struggles of Asian American performers due to yellowface and stereotyping.

Ing's final performance was an open mic rendition of "You've Got to Be Carefully Taught" as a way to protest an increase in violence against Asian Americans during the COVID-19 pandemic.

== Death ==
Ing died from complications of COVID-19 at Providence Saint Joseph Medical Center in Burbank, California, on July 31, 2021. His representation, Shushu Entertainment, disclosed that the fully-vaccinated Ing was first diagnosed with pneumonia in mid-July and then confirmed to have COVID-19 a few days later. After two weeks of battling the illness, he died from cardiac arrest. He was 89 years old.

Prior to his death, Ing gifted his 2004 Pacific Overtures co-star Francis Jue a suit he had worn at the premiere of the 1976 original Broadway production, requesting Jue wear it on the day he won a Tony Award. Jue fulfilled Ing's wish in 2025 when he received the Tony Award for Best Featured Actor in a Play for his performance in Yellow Face.

== Filmography ==
Year	Title	Role	Notes
1971	Made for Each Other		
1980	The Final Countdown	Lt. Kajima	
1980	Stir Crazy	Korean Doctor	
1985	Moving Violations	Construction Foreman	
1989	Troop Beverly Hills	Ho	
1997	Smilla's Sense of Snow	Licht	
2000	Brother	Doctor	
2020	Love, Older... Hiroshi & Kiyoko	Hiroshi	short film
2014	The Gambler	Mister Lee	
2020	Just Say When	Old Man	short film
2021	Year of the Detectives	Mr. Huang	Final film role
