= Dennis Edwards (American football) =

American football player (born 1959)

No. 74, 68, 95
- Position: Defensive end

Personal information
- Born: October 6, 1959 (age 67); Stockton, California, U.S.
- Listed height: 6 ft 4 in (1.93 m)
- Listed weight: 253 lb (115 kg)

Career information
- High school: Edison (Stockton)
- College: USC
- NFL draft: 1982: 9th round, 245th overall pick

Career history
- Buffalo Bills (1982)*; Los Angeles Express (1983-1984); Denver Gold (1984); Los Angeles Rams (1987)
- * Offseason or practice squad member only

Awards and highlights
- 2× First-team All-Pac-10 (1980, 1981)

Career NFL statistics
- Sacks: 1
- Stats at Pro Football Reference

Dennis Ray Edwards (born October 6, 1959) is an American former professional football player who was a defensive end in the National Football League (NFL) during the 1980s. He played college football for the USC Trojans. He was selected by the Buffalo Bills in the ninth round of the 1982 NFL draft and played for the Los Angeles Rams.

== Biography ==
Edwards was born in Stockton, California and graduated from Edison High School. He played college football at the University of Southern California, where he lettered in football from 1978 to 1981.

Edwards was selected in the ninth round (245th pick overall) by the Buffalo Bills in the 1982 NFL draft. He played three regular season games in 1987 for the Los Angeles Rams.

== See also ==
- History of the Los Angeles Rams
