= Fred Heron =

American football player (1944–2010)

No. 74
- Positions: Defensive tackle, Defensive end

Personal information
- Born: October 6, 1944; Stockton, California, U.S.
- Died: December 28, 2010 (aged 66); Stockton, California, U.S.
- Listed height: 6 ft 4 in (1.93 m)
- Listed weight: 260 lb (118 kg)

Career information
- High school: Edison (Stockton)
- College: San Jose State
- NFL draft: 1966: 3rd round, 45th overall pick

Career history
- St. Louis Cardinals (1966–1972)

Career NFL statistics
- Fumble recoveries: 1
- Sacks: 15.5
- Stats at Pro Football Reference

Frederick Roger Heron (October 6, 1944 – December 28, 2010) was a professional American football defensive lineman in the National Football League (NFL). He played seven seasons for the St. Louis Cardinals.

Heron was drafted by the Green Bay Packers in the third round of the 1966 college draft, and Vince Lombardi traded him as a replacement for a lineman in the St. Louis Cardinals who had been forced to retire due to a heart murmur.

He suffered a back injury in a game in 1969 that led to an operation in April 1970, but resulted in ongoing pain for some time. By the end of his time with the Cardinals, he had become bothered by the violence of the sport, and in one interview stated "I watched the quarterback on the ground in obvious pain. I suddenly thought to myself, 'Have I turned into some kind of animal? This is a game, but I'm trying to maim somebody.'" The Cardinals released him from his contract after his back injuries led to another surgery in October 1972. After Heron's retirement from football he went on to work as the campus security assistant at Rio Calaveras Elementary School in his hometown of Stockton, California.

He died on December 28, 2010.
