= Mark Hsu Syers =

Mark Hsu Syers (October 25, 1952— May 15, 1983) was a Broadway actor in the 1970s/80s.

== Biography ==
Syers graduated from Hopewell Valley Central High School and attended the University of New Mexico, where he acted in The Fantasticks. He graduated Emerson College in 1974 in Boston. He appeared onstage in Under Fire (in New York City) and Godspell (in Boston). His first major role was in Pacific Overtures where he played, among other roles, the Russian Admiral ("Please Hello"), the Soothsayer ("Chrysanthemum Tea"), the Thief ("Four Black Dragons"), and the Warrior ("Someone in a Tree"). He played King Herod in Jesus Christ Superstar and Magaldi in Evita. His voice can be heard on the cast recordings of Pacific Overtures and Evita.

He was featured in the television program "Anatomy of a Song: Someone in a Tree" with Stephen Sondheim, Gedde Watanabe and James Dybas, which was presented by Frank Rich.

Syers died in a head-on car crash in Pennington, New Jersey on a wet road in 1983, at the age of 30.
