= Matt Rawle =

British actor

Matt Rawle is a British actor. He was born in Birmingham on 10 March 1974. He has appeared in many high-profile theatre productions which include Martin Guerre, Evita and Zorro. His performances in the theatre have seen him nominated for numerous awards including WOS, Olivier awards.

== Theatre Work ==
Show	Production	Role	Awards / Nominations
Martin Guerre	Original London Production (1996)	Martin Guerre	
Into the Woods	Donmar Warehouse Revival (1998)	Rapunzel's Prince	
Hard Times	Original London Production (2000)	Master Sammy Sleary	
Almost Like Being In Love	Original London Production (2001)	Performer	
Putting It Together	Chichester Festival Production (2001)	The Younger Man	
Camelot	Open Air Theatre Revival (2004)	Lancelot	
Assassins	Sheffield Theatres Production (2006)	Balladeer	
Evita	London Revival (2006)	Ché	Nominated for WhatsOnStage Award
Aspects of Love	UK Tour (2007)	Alex Dillingham	
Zorro	London Revival (2008)	Don Diego de la Vega / Zorro	Nominated for Laurence Olivier Award for Best Actor in a Musical, Nominated for WhatsOnStage Award
The Light in the Piazza	UK Premiere (2009)	Fabrizio Naccarelli	
Pippin	Menier Chocolate Factory Revival (2011)	Leading Player	
Cabaret	UK Tour (2012)	Clifford Bradshaw	
Cabaret	London Revival (2012)	Clifford Bradshaw	
Anything Goes	UK Tour (2015)	Billy Crocker	
Evita	West End Concert (2023)	Ché	
Barnum	Watermill Theatre (2024)	PT Barnum	
