= Catherine Ricafort =

American actress and singer

Catherine Ricafort is an American actress, singer, software engineer, and entrepreneur. Ricafort has appeared in several Broadway productions, including Allegiance, the 2013 production of Cinderella, Mamma Mia!, Disaster! and Honeymoon in Vegas. Ricafort also appeared on NBC's The Sing-Off, in season 2, as part of the group, The Backbeats.

Although her family comes from the Philippines, Ricafort was born and raised in the United States. She graduated from Westlake High School (California), and was an active participant in the school's choir program. In 2009, she graduated from University of Southern California with a degree in Industrial and Systems engineering, and a minor in Musical Theatre. At USC, Ricafort participated in the a cappella group SoCal VoCals. As of 2017, Ricafort was appearing in a new Broadway production of Irving Berlin's Holiday Inn. Ricafort appeared as Karen in SpongeBob SquarePants from June 19, 2018 up until its closure on September 16, 2018.
