= Gary Griffin (director) =

American theater director (born 1959)

- Born: Rockford, Illinois, U.S.
- Education: University of Wisconsin–Eau Claire; Illinois State University
- Occupation: Theatre director

Gary Griffin (born 1959/1960) is an American theater director.

== Early life and education ==
Griffin grew up in Rockford, Illinois, where he graduated from East High School in 1978.

In 1982 he graduated from the University of Wisconsin–Eau Claire, where he performed in several musicals and directed Hello, Dolly! for their Summer Theatre program. He earned his M.F.A. from Illinois State University in 1986 and then moved to Chicago, where he began his directing career.

== Career ==
Griffin made his Broadway directing debut with the musical The Color Purple in 2005. He directed the revival of The Apple Tree on Broadway, which opened in December 2006, and Honeymoon in Vegas, which opened on Broadway in January 2015.

Griffin directed the staged concert presentations of Fiorello! (2013), Lost in the Stars (2011), Music in the Air (2009), The Apple Tree (2005), A Tree Grows in Brooklyn (2005), Pardon My English (2004) and The New Moon (2003) for New York City Center Encores! and Beautiful Thing at the Cherry Lane Theatre in 1999.

His production of Pacific Overtures was produced at London's Donmar Warehouse in 2003 and received the 2004 Olivier Award for "Outstanding Musical Production". This production was first presented at the Chicago Shakespeare Theater and won the 2002 Joseph Jefferson Award for Best Musical.

His production of My Fair Lady played both the McCarter Theatre and Hartford Stage in 2004 after its debut at Chicago's Court Theatre. In 2009 he directed a lauded production of West Side Story at the Stratford Festival of Canada. The reviewer for The Globe and Mail wrote: "Griffin's production has an electric charge that keeps the hairs on your skin tingling from start to finish, thanks to two incredible leads cast as the star-crossed lovers Tony and Maria and Rick Fox's assertive musical direction."

Griffin has directed several Stephen Sondheim musicals for Chicago Shakespeare Theater, including A Little Night Music in 2003 and Sunday in the Park with George in 2012. In 2014, he directed Road Show and Gypsy for CST. Griffin has received eight Joseph Jefferson Awards for directing and has twice been named a "Chicagoan of the Year in the Arts" by the Chicago Tribune. He was the Co-Artistic Director of the Apple Tree Theatre in Highland Park, Illinois, starting in 1998, and was the artistic director of Drury Lane Oakbrook Terrace, Illinois starting in 1993. Regarding his work at Drury Lane Oakbrook Terrace, the Chicago Tribune wrote: "Gary Griffin is rapidly establishing himself as one of the most versatile--and busiest--directors on the local theater scene. As artistic director at Drury Lane Oakbrook Terrace, he has faithfully re-created an impressive roster of vintage musicals in recent seasons, while somehow finding time to moonlight in contemporary drama for such groups as Apple Tree, Pegasus Players and Buffalo Theatre Ensemble."

== Music work ==
- Shine On! Volume One (Released September 30, 2011)
