= Isao Sato (actor) =

Japanese actor (1949–1990)

Isao Sato (佐藤 功, Satō Isao; June 27th, 1949 – March 9th, 1990) was a Japanese-American stage actor. Born in Tokyo, Sato emigrated to the United States in 1976, and is best known for his Broadway debut in the original cast of Pacific Overtures. For his role, he was nominated for a Tony award.

== Early life and education ==
Sato was born in Tokyo on June 27, 1949, and attended Keio University, where he studied law.

== Career ==
In Japan, Sato was a member of the Shiki Theatre Company. He made several appearances with them from 1970 to 1974 in musicals, plays and opera.

His Broadway debut was in the original all-Asian cast of Pacific Overtures in 1976 where he played Kayama. He was the only non-American member of the cast — in fact, he came to America specifically to audition for this role, after having missed the Tokyo auditions for the musical. Once he was cast, he emigrated to America. Reviews for the show were mixed, but Sato received praise for his performance. He was nominated for a Tony Award for Best Featured Actor in a Musical in 1976, but lost to Sammy Williams of A Chorus Line. His voice can be heard on the cast recording of Pacific Overtures.

In 1979, he played several roles in the play Fanshen about the Chinese Communist Revolution at the ACT Theatre in Seattle. He later played Wenqing in Peking Man, a play by Cao Yu at the Horace Mann Theater in New York City in 1980. At the Perry Street Theater in New York City, he acted in Dick Brukenfeld's historical drama Extenuating Circumstances, wherein an American man is accused of killing a young Chinese girl in Canton, China in 1821. His last major stage appearance was in 1986, in Roger Cornish's play A Class "C" Trial in Yokohama.

In 1987, he appeared on television in the show Spenser: For Hire on the episode "My Brother's Keeper", where he was reunited with his Pacific Overtures castmate Mako Iwamatsu. In the same year, he played a scientist in Penn & Teller's TV movie "Invisible Thread".

Sato pursued a second career as a flight instructor and was employed at Crest One Flight Academy in Florida.

== Personal life ==
While touring the West coast with Pacific Overtures, Sato married Janice Kanemitsu, who was a dancer on the tour. They were married on October 17, 1976 and divorced in 1979.

Sato died in a plane crash in Miramar, Florida on March 9, 1990. The Cessna he was in was flown by his student and collided with a banner plane. He was 40 years old.
