= 51st Tony Awards =

1997 US theatrical awards ceremony

- Date: June 1, 1997
- Location: Radio City Music Hall, New York City, New York
- Hosted by: Rosie O'Donnell
- Most wins: Chicago (6)
- Most nominations: The Life (12)

Television/radio coverage
- Network: CBS

The 51st Annual Tony Awards was broadcast by CBS from Radio City Music Hall on June 1, 1997. "Launching the Tonys" was telecast on PBS television. The event was hosted by Rosie O'Donnell. The awards ceremony moved away from Broadway for the first time in 30 years. As Radio City Music Hall is much larger than any Broadway theater, this allowed members of the general public to attend the ceremony.

Chicago won six awards, the most of the night, including Best Revival of a Musical. Jonathan Tunick's win for Titanic made him the seventh person to become an EGOT winner.

== Eligibility ==
Shows that opened on Broadway during the 1996–1997 season before May 1, 1997 are eligible.

Original plays

- An American Daughter
- Barrymore
- Into the Whirlwind
- Julia Sweeney's God Said "Ha!"
- The Last Night of Ballyhoo
- Skylight
- Sex and Longing
- Stanley
- Taking Sides
- The Young Man from Atlanta

Original musicals

- Dream
- Jekyll & Hyde
- Juan Darién
- The Life
- Play On!
- Steel Pier
- Titanic

Play revivals

- A Doll’s House
- The Gin Game
- Hughie
- The Little Foxes
- London Assurance
- Present Laughter
- The Rehearsal
- Summer and Smoke
- Tartuffe
- A Thousand Clowns
- Three Sisters

Musical revivals

- Annie
- Candide
- Chicago
- Once Upon a Mattress

== The ceremony ==
The opening number: "On Broadway" - Rosie O'Donnell; "Rent" - cast of Rent; "Jellicle Cats" - cast of Cats; "I'm A Woman" - female cast of Smokey Joe's Cafe, "Bring in 'da Noise, Bring in 'da Funk" - cast of Bring in 'da Noise, Bring in 'da Funk; "Greased Lightnin'" - Rosie O'Donnell and cast of Grease; "Be Our Guest" - cast of Beauty and the Beast.

Presenters: Julie Andrews, Lauren Bacall, Alec Baldwin, Christine Baranski, Dixie Carter, Savion Glover, Whoopi Goldberg, Joel Grey, Marilu Henner, Hal Holbrook, Swoosie Kurtz, Liza Minnelli, Mary Tyler Moore, Mandy Patinkin, Bernadette Peters, Chita Rivera, Roseanne Barr, Susan Sarandon, Jimmy Smits, Marisa Tomei, Rip Torn, Leslie Ann Warren, Raquel Welch.

Musicals represented:

- Steel Pier — "Everybody Dance" - Karen Ziemba, Gregory Harrison, Company
- The Life — "My Body" - Sam Harris, Lillias White, Company
- Annie — "Tomorrow" - Brittny Kissinger
- Candide — "Bon Voyage" - Jim Dale, Company
- Once Upon a Mattress — "Shy" - Sarah Jessica Parker, Company
- Chicago — "All That Jazz"/"Hot Honey Rag" - Bebe Neuwirth, Ann Reinking, Company
- Titanic — "There She Is" - Michael Cerveris, Company

== Winners and nominees ==
Winners are in bold

Best Play	Best Musical
**The Last Night of Ballyhoo – Alfred Uhry**; Skylight – David Hare; Stanley – Pam Gems; The Young Man from Atlanta – Horton Foote	**Titanic**; Juan Darien; Steel Pier; The Life
Best Revival of a Play	Best Revival of a Musical
**A Doll's House**; London Assurance; Present Laughter; The Gin Game	**Chicago**; Annie; Candide; Once Upon a Mattress
Best Performance by a Leading Actor in a Play	Best Performance by a Leading Actress in a Play
**Christopher Plummer – Barrymore as John Barrymore**; Brian Bedford – London Assurance as Sir Harcourt Courtly; Michael Gambon – Skylight as Tom Sergeant; Antony Sher – Stanley as Stanley	**Janet McTeer – A Doll's House as Nora Helmer**; Julie Harris – The Gin Game as Fonsia Dorsey; Shirley Knight – The Young Man from Atlanta as Lily Dale Kidder; Lia Williams – Skylight as Kyra Hollis
Best Performance by a Leading Actor in a Musical	Best Performance by a Leading Actress in a Musical
**James Naughton – Chicago as Billy Flynn**; Robert Cuccioli – Jekyll & Hyde as Dr. Henry Jekyll/Edward Hyde; Jim Dale – Candide as Various Characters; Daniel McDonald – Steel Pier as Bill Kelly	**Bebe Neuwirth – Chicago as Velma Kelly**; Pamela Isaacs – The Life as Queen; Tonya Pinkins – Play On! as Lady Liv; Karen Ziemba – Steel Pier as Rita Racine
Best Performance by a Featured Actor in a Play	Best Performance by a Featured Actress in a Play
**Owen Teale – A Doll's House as Torvald Helmer**; Terry Beaver – The Last Night of Ballyhoo as Adolph; Brian Murray – The Little Foxes as Oscar; William Biff McGuire – The Young Man from Atlanta as Pete Davenport	**Lynne Thigpen – An American Daughter as Dr. Judith B. Kaufman**; Helen Carey – London Assurance as Lady Gay Spanker; Dana Ivey – The Last Night of Ballyhoo as Boo; Celia Weston – The Last Night of Ballyhoo as Aunt Reba
Best Performance by a Featured Actor in a Musical	Best Performance by a Featured Actress in a Musical
**Chuck Cooper – The Life as Memphis**; Joel Blum – Steel Pier as Buddy Becker; André De Shields – Play On! as Jester; Sam Harris – The Life as Jojo	**Lillias White – The Life as Sonja**; Marcia Lewis – Chicago as Matron Mama Morton; Andrea Martin – Candide as The Old Lady; Debra Monk – Steel Pier as Shelby Stevens
Best Book of a Musical	Best Original Score (Music and/or Lyrics) Written for the Theatre
**Peter Stone – Titanic**; Leslie Bricusse – Jekyll & Hyde; David Thompson – Steel Pier; David Newman, Ira Gasman and Cy Coleman – The Life	**Titanic** – **Maury Yeston (music and lyrics)**; Juan Darien – Elliot Goldenthal (music and lyrics); Steel Pier – John Kander (music) and Fred Ebb (lyrics); The Life – Cy Coleman (music) and Ira Gasman (lyrics)
Best Scenic Design	Best Costume Design
**Stewart Laing – Titanic**; John Lee Beatty – The Little Foxes; G. W. Mercier and Julie Taymor – Juan Darien; Tony Walton – Steel Pier	**Judith Dolan – Candide**; Ann Curtis – Jekyll & Hyde; William Ivey Long – Chicago; Martin Pakledinaz – The Life
Best Lighting Design	Best Orchestrations
**Ken Billington – Chicago**; Beverly Emmons – Jekyll & Hyde; Donald Holder – Juan Darien; Richard Pilbrow – The Life	**Jonathan Tunick – Titanic**; Michael Gibson – Steel Pier; Luther Henderson – Play On!; Don Sebesky and Harold Wheeler – The Life
Best Direction of a Play	Best Direction of a Musical
**Anthony Page – A Doll's House**; John Caird – Stanley; Richard Eyre – Skylight; Charles Nelson Reilly – The Gin Game	**Walter Bobbie – Chicago**; Michael Blakemore – The Life; Scott Ellis – Steel Pier; Julie Taymor – Juan Darien
Best Choreography
**Ann Reinking – Chicago**; Wayne Cilento – Dream; Joey McKneely – The Life; Susan Stroman – Steel Pier

== Special awards ==
- Regional Theater Tony Award
  - Berkeley Repertory Theatre
- Special Tony Award for Lifetime Achievement in the Theatre
  - Bernard B. Jacobs (posthumously)

=== Multiple nominations and awards ===
These productions had multiple nominations:

- 12 nominations: The Life
- 11 nominations: Steel Pier
- 8 nominations: Chicago
- 5 nominations: Juan Darien and Titanic
- 4 nominations: Candide, A Doll's House, Jekyll & Hyde, The Last Night of Ballyhoo and Skylight
- 3 nominations: The Gin Game, London Assurance, Play On!, Stanley and The Young Man from Atlanta
- 2 nominations: The Little Foxes

The following productions received multiple awards.

- 6 wins: Chicago
- 5 wins: Titanic
- 4 wins: A Doll's House
- 2 wins: The Life

== See also ==
- Drama Desk Awards
- 1997 Laurence Olivier Awards – equivalent awards for West End theatre productions
- Obie Award
- New York Drama Critics' Circle
- Theatre World Award
- Lucille Lortel Awards
