= Angela Robinson (actress) =

American actress and singer

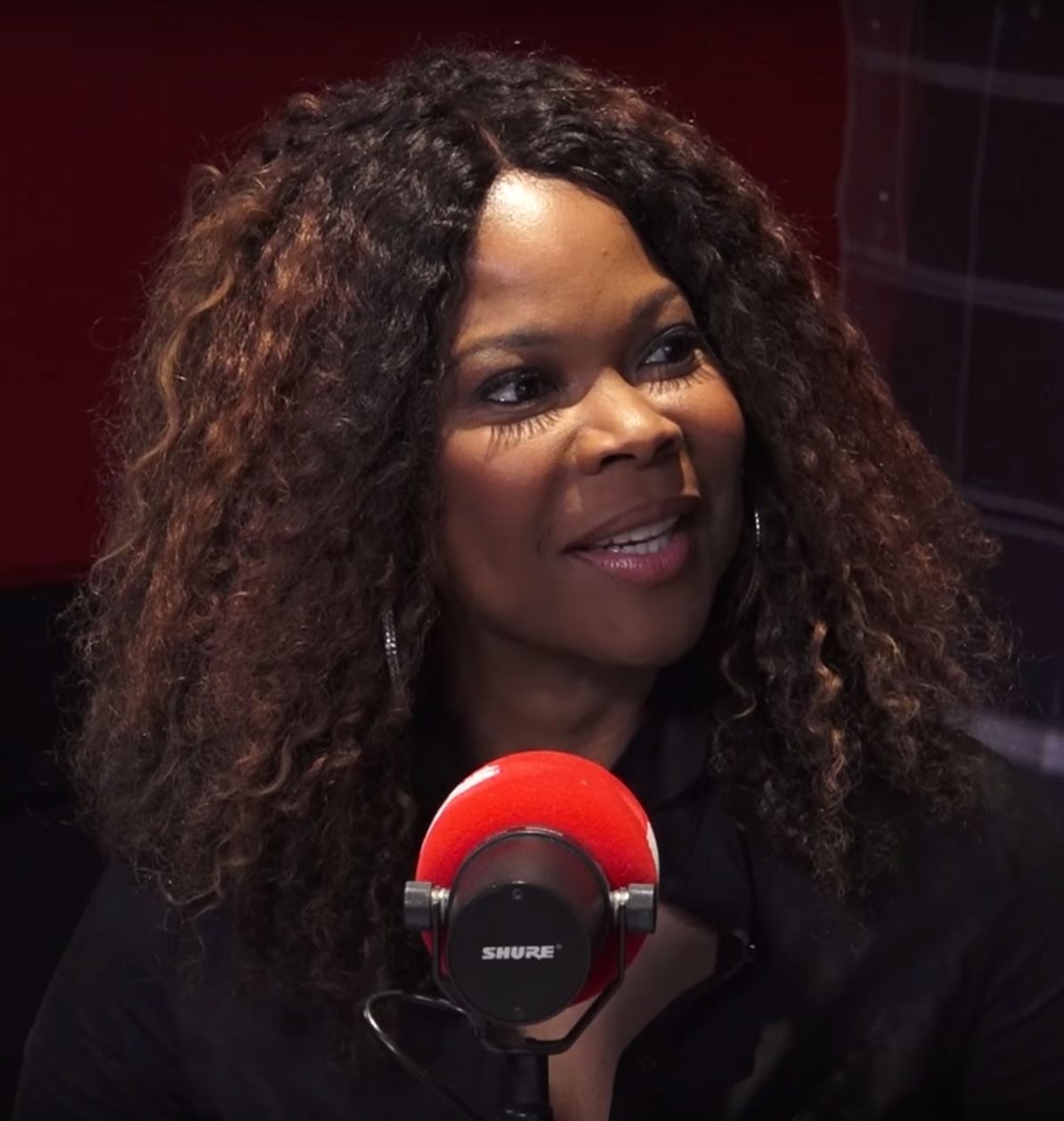
- Robinson in 2018
- Born: Jacksonville, Florida, U.S
- Occupation(s): Actress, singer
- Years active: 1989–present
- Spouse: Scott Whitehurst (m. 1996)
- Children: 1

Angela Robinson is an American actress and singer. Best known for playing the role of Veronica Harrington in the OWN primetime soap opera The Haves and the Have Nots, winning the Gracie Award for Outstanding Female Actress. During her career she acted on Broadway and Off-Broadway productions, working under the direction of Sheldon Epps, Tina Landau, Kathleen Marshall, Gary Griffin.

Notable Robinson stage roles were as Shug Avery on The Color Purple's U.S. National Tour and as Deena Jones on Dreamgirls' U.S. National Tour.

== Life and career ==
Robinson was born and raised in Jacksonville, Florida. She graduated from William M. Raines High School in Jacksonville and Florida A&M University in Tallahassee, Florida. While in college, she won the crown of Miss Florida A&M University.

She moved to New York City in 1992 and began acting career on the stages. In 1995 she appeared on Dreamgirls as Deena Jones at the Paper Mill Playhouse in Millburn, New Jersey. In 1997 she was cast in the original Broadway production of Play On! directed by Sheldon Epps. Between 1998 and 1999 Robinson was cast in The Wizard of Oz U.S. National Tour acting with Mickey Rooney and Eartha Kitt. During the same years, she performed at TheatreFest at Montclair State University with Ruth Brown and Carol Woods.

In 2001 Robinson starred as Gwynne on Bells Are Ringing Broadway revival, with the direction of Tina Landau and choreographed by Jeff Calhoun. The same year she also made her film acting debut on Another Bed. In 2002 she performed in Golden Boy at the New York City Center's musical concert series Encores!. Between 2003 and 2004 she starred as member of the cast on The Public Theater's Off-Broadway production of Radiant Baby, on Ain't Misbehavin' at the Paper Mill Playhouse, and on Kathleen Marshall's Wonderful Town Broadway revival. In 2024 Robinson reprised her role of Deena Jones on Dreamgirls's U.S. National Tour, starring with Frenchie Davis.

In 2005 she appeared on television in the episode "Contagious" of Law & Order: Special Victims Unit. Between 2005 and 2008 Robinson was selected as cast member of Gary Griffin's The Color Purple original production at the Broadway Theatre. She continued to be a cast member on the first U.S. National Tour, in which she also served as understudy actress for the role of Shug Avery, played by former Destiny's Child member Michelle Williams. During the final part of the tour Robinson played as Shug Avery, acting with Fantasia Barrino, Felicia P. Fields and LaToya London.

From May 2013 to July 2021, Robinson starred as Veronica Harrington, with albeit a high-end and classy presentation, a no-holds-barred prominent villainess on the Oprah Winfrey Network primetime soap opera, The Haves and the Have Nots, produced by Tyler Perry. For her performance on The Haves and the Have Nots, Robinson received a Gracie Award for "Outstanding Female Actor - One to Watch," in 2015.

In 2021, Robinson starred as Billie Holiday in the North Carolina Theatre production of Lady Day at Emerson's Bar and Grill. In 2024 she acted on Tyler Perry's Netflix film Mea Culpa alongside Kelly Rowland and Trevante Rhodes, and return to television with the miniseries Lady in the Lake for Apple TV+.

== Personal life ==
In 1996, Robinson married stage actor Scott Whitehurst. In June 2018, they adopted a son named Robinson Scott.

== Acting credits ==
=== Film and television ===
Year	Title	Role	Notes
2001	Another Bed	Alma	Short film
2005	Law & Order: Special Victims Unit	Mrs. Wheeler	Episode: "Contagious"
2013–2021	The Haves and the Have Nots	Veronica Harrington	Series regular Gracie Award for Outstanding Female Actor- One to Watch (2015)
2024	Mea Culpa	Renee	
2024	Lady in the Lake	Myrtle Summer	Miniseries

=== Stage ===
Year	Title	Role	Venue	Notes
1995	Dreamgirls	Deena Jones	Paper Mill Playhouse	
1997	Play On!	Lady Liv; Miss Mary; Vy	Brooks Atkinson Theatre	Original Broadway Production
1998—1999	The Wizard of Oz	Apple Tree Voice; Ensemble	U.S. National Tour	
2000	Lucky Duck	Serena	Mountain View Center	
2001	Bells Are Ringing	Gwynne	Plymouth Theatre	Broadway revival
2002	Golden Boy	Ensemble	Encores!	
2003	Radiant Baby	Ensemble	The Public Theater	Original Off-Broadway Production
2003	Ain't Misbehavin'	Ensemble	Paper Mill Playhouse	
2004	Wonderful Town	Ensemble	Al Hirschfeld Theatre	Broadway revival
2004	Bye Bye Birdie	Ensemble	Encores!	
2004	Dreamgirls	Deena Jones	U.S. National Tour	
2009—2010	The Color Purple	Shug Avery	U.S. National Tour	
2021	Lady Day at Emerson's Bar and Grill	Billie Holiday	North Carolina Theatre	
