= I've Got Your Number (Cy Coleman song) =

Song
- Published: 1962
- Genre: Jazz
- Composer: Cy Coleman
- Lyricist: Carolyn Leigh

"I've Got Your Number" is a popular song composed by Cy Coleman with lyrics by Carolyn Leigh for the 1962 musical Little Me. It was originally performed by Swen Swenson and Virginia Martin in the 1962 Broadway play.

American Theatre editor-in-chief Rob Weinert-Kendt wrote of the song in 2020, "It's got a sharp lyric by Carolyn Leigh and a wonderfully sneaky chart by Cy Coleman, a jazzman who happened to write for the musical theatre. The key to its success is in its marriage of those two elements; it's a song about essentially cornering someone, not with hostility or predation but with a certain teasing knowingness, as if to say, 'Drop the act, I'm onto you, we belong together,' and the song's harmonic structure keeps enacting a sort of unflustered, don't-change-the-subject move."

The song was performed frequently on TV variety shows of the 1960s, such as by Gwen Verdon and Danny Kaye on The Danny Kaye Show in 1964, Joey Heatherton on The Dean Martin Show in 1965, and Barbara Eden on The Andy Williams Show in 1966. It was also sung and danced by Dick Van Dyke and Mary Tyler Moore on "The Alan Brady Show Goes to Jail," a 1964 episode of The Dick Van Dyke Show.

== Notable recordings ==
- George Chakiris - 1962 single
- Tommy Leonetti - 1962 single
- Tony Bennett - included in his 1963 album I Wanna Be Around...
- Vikki Carr - included in her 1963 album Color Her Great!
- Peggy Lee - for her 1964 album In Love Again!
- Gene Barry - 1965 single
- Marvin Gaye recorded in 1965 but not released until 2015 on the album Motown Unreleased 1965: Marvin Gaye.
- Nancy Wilson - in her 1966 album From Broadway with Love
- Ella Fitzgerald on her album Whisper Not
- Jack Jones - in the soundtrack for the 2013 film American Hustle
- Teri Thornton - on her 1963 album Somewhere in the Night
