= Somewhere in the Night (Teri Thornton album) =

Studio album by Teri Thornton
- Released: February 4, 1963
- Genres: Jazz, pop
- Length: 35:26
- Label: Dauntless
- Producer: Tom Wilson

Somewhere in the Night is a 1963 studio album by vocalist Teri Thornton, arranged and conducted by Larry Wilcox and produced by Tom Wilson. It was released on vinyl LP on the Dauntless record label. The album features the song "Somewhere in the Night", the theme song for season 2 and 3 of the crime drama television series Naked City (arranged by Billy May and his orchestra in the series). The album cover art was photographed by Ray Ross.

== Track listing ==
1. "Somewhere in the Night" (Billy May, Milt Raskin) - 2:59
2. "I've Got Your Number" (Carolyn Leigh, Cy Coleman) - 2:49
3. "There's a Boat Dat's Leavin' Soon For New York" (George Gershwin) - 3:33
4. "Lonely One" (Babs Gonzales) - 2:51
5. "You've Got to Have Heart" (Jerry Ross, Richard Adler) - 2:31
6. "Stormy Weather" (Harold Arlen, Ted Koehler) - 4:14
7. "I Believe in You" (Frank Loesser) - 2:51
8. "Mood Indigo" (Barney Bigard, Duke Ellington, Irving Mills) - 4:33
9. "Quizas, Quizas, Quizas" (Joe Davis, Osvaldo Farrés) - 2:26
10. "I've Got the World on a String" (Harold Arlen, Ted Koehler) - 2:34
11. "Clap Yo' Hands" (George & Ira Gershwin) - 2:47
12. "Serenade in Blue" (Harry Warren) - 3:49
