= Virginia Martin =

American actress

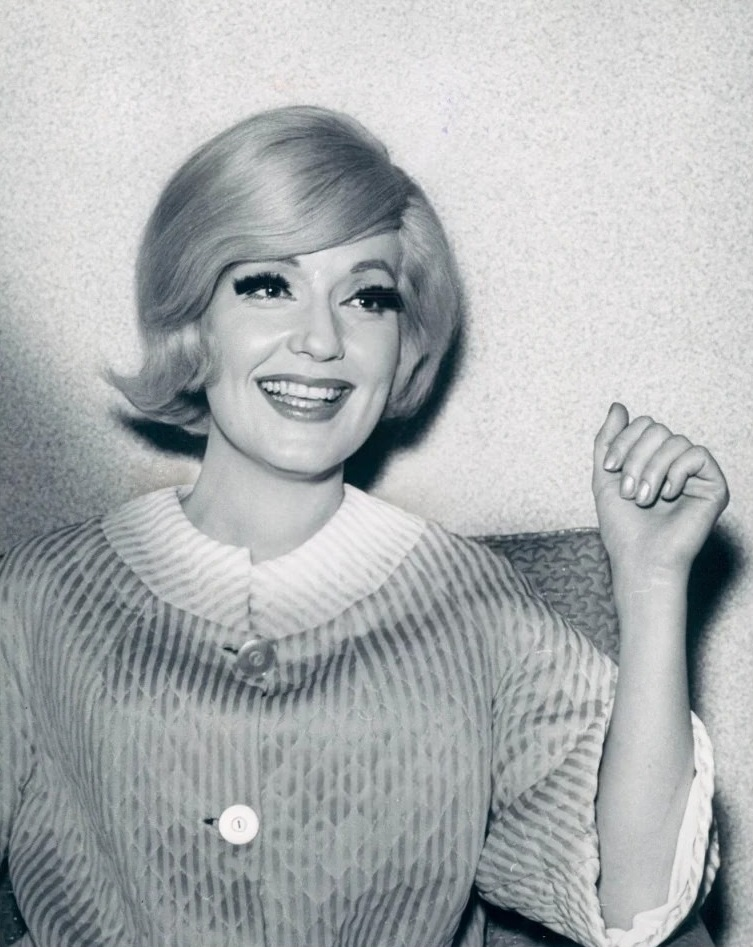
- Born: Virginia Marie Martin; December 2, 1927; Chattanooga, Tennessee, U.S.
- Died: August 27, 2009 (aged 81); Chattanooga, Tennessee, U.S.
- Occupations: Actress, singer

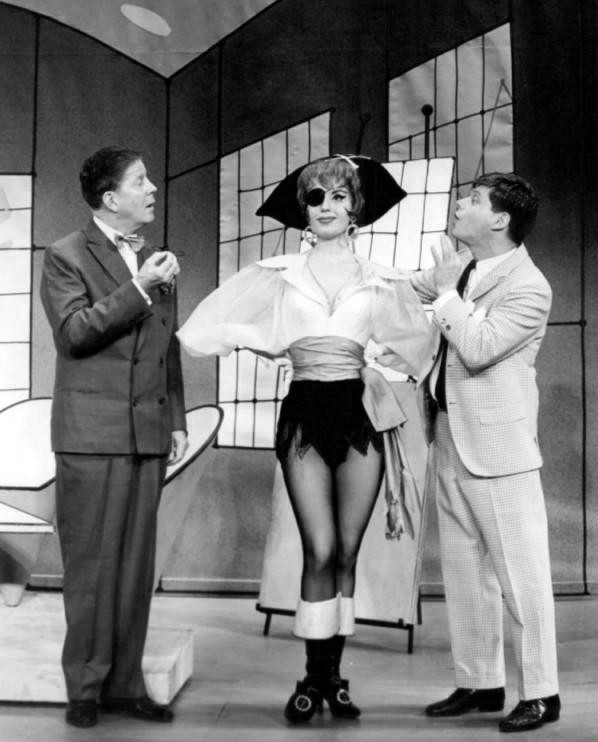
L-R: Rudy Vallee, Virginia Martin and Robert Morse in Broadway production of How to Succeed at Business Without Really Trying (1961)

Virginia Marie Martin (December 2, 1927 – August 27, 2009) was an American actress and singer known for her work on the Broadway stage and on television. She was nominated for the Tony Award for Best Featured Actress in a Musical in 1963.

== Early life ==
Martin was born in Chattanooga, Tennessee, the daughter of Tommy T. and Harville Martin. She had two brothers, Jere and Donald, and was a graduate of the University of Chattanooga in 1949. Her studies included ballet, musical theory, piano and voice. She sang with the Chattanooga Opera Association, was soprano soloist at Second Presbyterian Church, and was Miss Chattanooga 1949. She worked as entertainment manager at resort hotels in upstate New York and Florida for five summers. After she moved to New York City she worked as a fashion model and studied drama and voice at the American Theatre Wing.

== Theatre ==
Martin made her Broadway debut during the original run of the musical South Pacific in the role of Ensign Bessie Noonan.

In 1954, Martin was in the chorus of the original Broadway cast for the musical The Pajama Game. In 1955, she was a part of the cast of the musical Ankles Aweigh, again in the chorus. She next appeared in the revue show New Faces of 1956.

In 1958, Martin understudied the lead role of Irene Lovelle under star Vivian Blaine in the musical Say, Darling.

In 1961, Martin originated the role of Hedy La Rue in the original Broadway production of How to Succeed in Business Without Really Trying.

In 1963, Martin was nominated for a Tony Award for Best Featured Actress in a Musical for originating the role of Young Belle Poitrine in the musical Little Me. Martin played the younger version of Belle Poitrine with Nancy Andrews playing the older version of the character.

In February 1965, Martin played the lead role of Emily Kirsten in the musical Bajour; the role was originated by Nancy Dussault.

Her last appearance on Broadway was in the 1979 musical Carmelina.

== Television ==
Martin made several appearances on Bewitched between 1965 and 1966, notably as Charmaine Leach, the wife of conniving private investigator Charlie Leach (Robert Strauss)and also the role of Roxie Ames.

== Death ==
She died on August 27, 2009, in her native Chattanooga, Tennessee, at the age of 81 from undisclosed causes.
