= Sam Harris (singer) =

American singer & actor (born 1961)

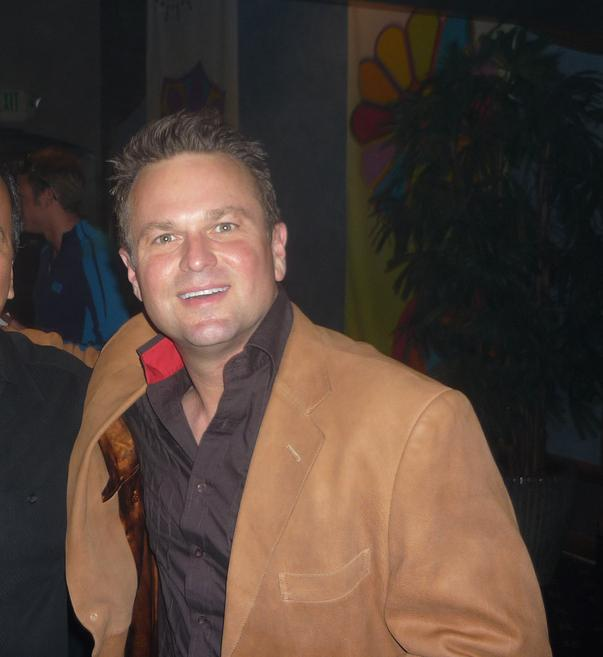
- Harris in 2009
- Born: Samuel Kent Harris; June 4, 1961 (age 65); Sand Springs, Oklahoma, United States
- Occupations: Singer; musician; actor
- Spouse: Danny Jacobsen (m. 2008)
- Children: 1
- Website: Official website

Samuel Kent Harris (born June 4, 1961) is an American pop and musical theatre musician as well as a television, theatre and film actor.

== Career ==
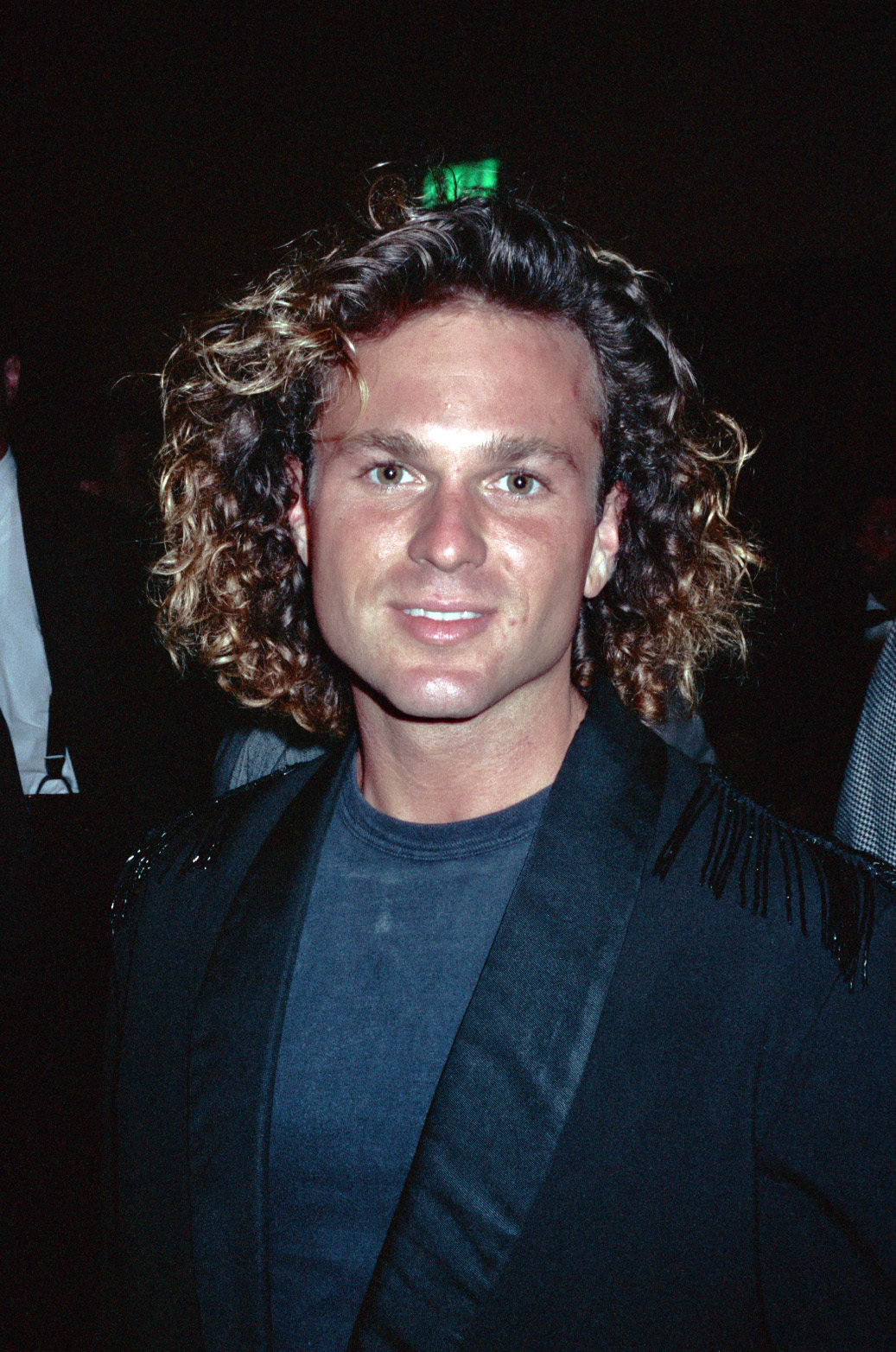
Harris in 1990

=== Singing ===
Harris got his start as the grand champion singer of Star Search in its premiere season in 1983. He gained acclaim and became best known for his winning rendition of the song "Over the Rainbow" on the show. "Over the Rainbow" has since become his signature song. His appearance on Star Search led to him landing a contract with Motown Records. His first single, "Sugar Don't Bite", reached number 36 on the Billboard Hot 100 chart in November 1984. "Over the Rainbow" was released in Australia and peaked at number 65 in 1985.

He is a multi-million selling recording artist with nine studio albums to his credit. He can also be heard on numerous concert, guest artist, and cast recordings. He has toured extensively in concert and has played to sold-out audiences at major venues including New York's Carnegie Hall, Los Angeles' Universal Amphitheatre, and London's West End. He has appeared with the Boston Pops Orchestra, at the White House, and has sung on a variety of television specials and live productions. On February 12, 2008, he released a new single entitled "War on War" that became an Internet phenomenon with music videos made by the general public. The song became a part of his album, Free, which was released that summer. The single "Change Is On the Way" was written to support the Obama campaign and was heard on numerous television shows and behind Internet videos around the time of the election. In 2010, Sam wrote and released "My Reclamation", which has become an anthem for marriage equality.

=== Stage ===
On Broadway, he received a Drama Desk nomination for his role in the Jeff Calhoun-directed revival of Grease, and a Drama League Award as well as Tony, Outer Critic's Circle and Drama Desk Award nominations for his work in Cy Coleman's Tony-nominated musical The Life. He's also appeared on Broadway in Mel Brooks' Tony Award-winning musical The Producers, in the national tour of Joseph and the Amazing Technicolor Dreamcoat, and in the musicals Jesus Christ Superstar, Cabaret, Hair, Pippin and The First Wives Club. He also starred in the self-penned shows Hardcopy, Different Hats, Revival, and the critically acclaimed SAM. Harris's most recent show was Ham: A Musical Memoir which played in New York and Los Angeles. The Los Angeles run received Ovation Awards for Best Musical, Best Actor (Harris), and Best Musical Director (for Todd Schroeder).

=== Films ===
Harris has appeared in three feature films to date: In the Weeds (2000, as Jonathan), the documentary Little Man (2005, as himself) and Elena Undone (2010, as Tyler).

=== Television ===
Harris co-created the television series Down to Earth (1984, which ran for four years and 104 episodes). He appeared on Motown Returns to The Apollo in 1985. In addition to his performances on Star Search, he was a series regular on The Class (2006-2007 - Perry Pearl). In 1986-87, Harris was one of several Star Search alumni who performed the contestants' songs on the songwriting competition series You Write the Songs, with Harris singing the winning song "Everybody Needs A Dream" by songwriter Tom Grose (also a Star Search alumnus with his band The Varsity.) Harris is also credited on Rules of Engagement (Jackie, recurring), The Wayne Brady Show, CSI (Alan Widcom), Major Crimes (Jason) among others. He was music supervisor on Michael Jackson: 30th Anniversary Celebration (2001), and has also appeared on numerous talk shows including The Rosie O'Donnell Show (1997 and 2000 - three episodes), The Tonight Show with Jay Leno (1994), Brunch (co-host (2006), The Oprah Winfrey Show (1997 and 2001 - two episodes), Dr. Phil's 500th episode (2005), The View (2007 - one episode), The Tyra Banks Show (2010), The Dr. Drew Show (2011) and Late Night With Jimmy Fallon.

=== Author ===
In 2014, Harris penned a collection of autobiographical essays and stories entitled Ham - Slices of a Life which was published by Simon & Schuster/Gallery Books, and received unanimous critical praise. Harris subsequently adapted the book into an Off-off-Broadway solo performance, HAM: A Musical Memoir.

In 2020, Harris released his second book, a novel entitled The Substance of All Things.

== Personal life ==
Sam Harris left his home in Oklahoma at the age of 15 to pursue a theater career, finished high school through correspondence courses, and briefly attended the University of California, Los Angeles, where he received the Frank Sinatra Pop Singing Award.

Harris and Danny Jacobsen, who is a director and presentation coach for numerous blue-chip companies and also a film producer, have been together since 1994. In 2008, they adopted a son, Cooper Atticus Harris-Jacobsen, and then the couple married.

== Stage work ==
- Jesus Christ Superstar (1990)
- Cabaret (1992)
- Joseph and the Amazing Technicolor Dreamcoat (1994)
- Grease (1994)
- The Life (1997)
- The Producers (2002)
- SAM. (2003)
- The Jazz Singer (1998) (workshop)
- Hair (2000)
- Funny Girl (2002) (benefit concert)
- Mack & Mabel (2003) (benefit concert)
- Pippin (2005)
- The First Wives Club (2009)
- Ham: A Musical Memoir (2014-2015)
