= Little Me (musical) =

Musical by Neil Simon and Cy Coleman

- Revival cast recording
- Music: Cy Coleman
- Lyrics: Carolyn Leigh
- Book: Neil Simon
- Basis: Little Me: The Intimate Memoirs of that Great Star of Stage, Screen and Television/Belle Poitrine, a novel by Patrick Dennis
- Productions: 1962 Broadway; 1964 West End; 1982 Broadway revival 1984 West End; 1998 Broadway revival 2014 City Center Encores!

Little Me is a musical written by Neil Simon, with music by Cy Coleman and lyrics by Carolyn Leigh. The original 1962 Broadway production featured Sid Caesar in multiple roles with multiple stage accents, playing all of the heroine's husbands and lovers. One of the better-known songs from the musical is "I've Got Your Number".

== Background ==
The musical Little Me is based on the novel by Patrick Dennis titled Little Me: The Intimate Memoirs of that Great Star of Stage, Screen and Television/Belle Poitrine, an illustrated autobiography of an imaginary diva (published in 1961). In his memoir Rewrites: A Memoir, Neil Simon wrote that aside from tailoring the musical's book to the talents of Sid Caesar, the second attraction of the project was a chance to work with choreographer Bob Fosse. "With the exception of Jerome Robbins, for my money Fosse was the best choreographer who ever worked in the theater." (Simon and Caesar had worked together on the television variety program Your Show of Shows.)

== Productions ==
Little Me opened on Broadway at the Lunt-Fontanne Theatre on November 17, 1962 and closed on June 27, 1963, running for 257 performances. Directed by Cy Feuer and Bob Fosse with choreography by Fosse, Sid Caesar starred playing multiple roles, with Virginia Martin as Young Belle and Nancy Andrews as Old Belle. Barbara Sharma was a featured dancer in the show.

The London production opened at the Cambridge Theatre on November 18, 1964 and ran for 334 performances. Bruce Forsyth and Eileen Gourlay starred.

The 1982 revival at the Eugene O'Neill Theatre opened on January 21, 1982 and closed on February 21, 1982 after 30 previews and 36 performances. The multiple Caesar roles were split between Victor Garber and James Coco. The director was Robert Drivas and choreographer was Peter Gennaro, with Mary Gordon Murray as Belle; Bebe Neuwirth was in the ensemble.

Little Me was revived on the West End at the Prince of Wales Theatre, opening on May 30, 1984 and running for 409 performances. Russ Abbot and Sheila White starred.

Little Me was revived on Broadway by the Roundabout Theatre Company at the Criterion Center Stage Right as a vehicle for Martin Short, opening on November 12, 1998 and closing on February 7, 1999 after 99 performances and 43 previews. With direction and choreography by Rob Marshall, Faith Prince played the combined roles of Old and Young Belle. According to Rob Marshall: "Without Marty, we wouldn't do it. And we're fortunate that we still have Neil and Cy with us, and they'll be working with us and tailoring it for Marty."

Little Me ran in its original form with 42nd Street Moon in San Francisco in 2013, directed by Eric Inman and with choreography by Staci Arriaga. Lead actor Jason Graae was described as "stepping into the roles previously inhabited by two of the most versatile entertainers in Broadway and Hollywood history" and as having "boundless energy and a staggering level of comedic talent." In the same year, the play ran at the Rose and Crown Theatre, London. The musical was directed by Brendan Matthew, with choreography by Chris Whittaker and design by Chris Hone.

The New York City Center Encores! staged concert ran from February 5, 2014 to February 9, 2014, starring Christian Borle, Rachel York as Belle, Judy Kaye as Older Belle, and Harriet Harris as Mrs. Eggleston. The production was directed by John Rando with choreography by Joshua Bergasse.

Porchlight Music Theatre presented Little Me as a part of its "Porchlight Revisits" season in which they stage three forgotten musicals per year. It was in Chicago, Illinois in March 2017. It was directed by Artistic Director Michael Weber.

== Plot ==
Note: This summary is based on the original Broadway production. The libretto was revised heavily for both of the subsequent revivals, with songs cut, added, or moved (most notably "Little Me").

Act I

Belle Poitrine (née Schlumpfert) writes her autobiography with the help of Patrick Dennis ("The Truth"). As a child from Venezuela, Illinois, she lived in Drifter's Row, the poor side of town and dreamed of living on The Bluff, the rich part of town ("The Other Side of the Tracks"). Then she meets Noble Eggleston, from the "right" side of the tracks, and they feel an instant connection due to the presence of their "I Love You Theme" that plays whenever they touch. He invites her to his Sweet Sixteen party, and she agrees to go. At the party, Noble's friends all try to out-snob each other ("The Rich Kid Rag"). Noble's mother discovers that Belle lives in Drifter's Row and demands that Belle be sent away. Belle and Noble profess their love ("I Love You"), and Belle agrees to find wealth, culture, and social position to become equal to Noble so they can be together. She begins her journey, ignoring her friend George, who tells her it will only lead to her "getting kicked in the heart" ("The Other Side of the Tracks (Reprise)").

Her first conquest is old, rich banker Mr. Pinchley, who is the "meanest, nastiest, and stingiest man in town" who refuses to help the poor. After Belle gets him to look at himself, Mr. Pinchley decides he no longer wants to be hated. Belle agrees to help him, and he wins the love of his son, and the citizens of Drifter's Row due to his generosity ("Deep Down Inside"). He shows her a gun, telling her that he was going to kill himself for his birthday, and that now, because of her, he won't. He asks Belle to marry him, and, as it will award her with wealth, culture, and social position, she accepts. When she gives him a hug, the gun accidentally goes off, killing him. Arrested and put on trial for murder, she meets theatrical producers Benny and Bernie Buchsbaum and they advise her to become a star ("Be a Performer"). With Noble (who is now attending Harvard and Yale) helping her, she is acquitted and becomes a famous vaudeville performer with her own signature number ("Dimples") and no talent.

Benny and Bernie fire her when they get a new star, and she is forced to become a camera girl at a club. There, she discovers Noble's mother is forcing him to marry Ramona, his wealthy friend. Devastated, she runs off. Then, the grand Val du Val makes his entrance and performs his sexually implicit song ("Boom-Boom") with his "Val du Val-ettes". Deciding she has nothing left to live for, she prepares to jump off the roof. Val du Val notices this and prevents her from jumping, and leaves her in the hands of the club's owner. The owner is revealed to be George, who charms her ("I've Got Your Number") and gets her pregnant.

At a party during World War I, she meets and marries near-sighted soldier Fred Poitrine, who mistakes her pregnant condition for excess weight ("Real Live Girl"). Fred is shipped off to France immediately after they marry, and soon dies in action from a serious digit wound after his finger gets caught in a typewriter. Belle has her baby and discovers that Noble is in trouble in France. She leaves the baby to her mother, quickly travels to France and, after failing to find Noble, stays to cheer up the troops with the help of some willing girls ("Real Live Girl (Reprise)"). She then finds Val du Val has been left by his lover and now has amnesia. Belle uses the "booms" of the cannons to help him remember ("Boom-Boom (Reprise)"). His memory returns and they decide to marry. However, Noble has also arrived and Belle decides to marry him instead. When Val returns, she informs him of this, but he believes she "jilted" him like his old girlfriend and loses his memory again. Remembering how Val saved her life, she marries Val and tells Noble she no longer loves him ("Finale Act I: Boom-Boom").

Act II

Five years later, Belle and Val sail on the SS Gigantic. She runs into Noble again, and, with the help of their "I Love You Theme", they reveal they still love each other. The boat hits an iceberg and Noble helps save the passengers while they reaffirm their love ("I Love (Sinking) You (Reprise)"). Discovering Belle loves Noble, Val du Val believes he has been "jilted" and loses his memory. He dies when he forgets how to swim, the only casualty of the sinking. This allows Belle to sue the boat company for the loss of her husband and luggage, and she successfully attains the wealth she had been seeking.

Bernie and Benny ask her to fund their next movie with her enormous fortune, and she accepts both the charity and the lead role ("Poor Little Hollywood Star"). While looking for a producer, she meets the director Otto Schnitzler ("Be a Performer (Reprise)"). As they shoot the movie, Otto shows an actor what to do with a stage knife but actually stabs himself. Belle finishes the movie herself, which is a huge critical failure. However, she receives a huge award for her role in the movie, meaning she has attained culture.

During The Great Depression, Ramona's family has lost all of their money, and Miss Eggleston forces her and Noble to divorce, leaving him free for Belle. Belle, meanwhile, is still in search of social position and determines to seek it in Europe ("Little Me").

Belle next journeys to Monte Carlo and meets Prince Cherney, the leader of a small, impoverished nation. He has a heart attack when he gambles his country's entire treasury and loses. He needs his hypodermic needle, but Belle gives him his fountain pen, leading him close to death. He and his many mourners make a huge deal out of it ("Goodbye (The Prince's Farewell)"), but Belle gives him part of her giant fortune to save his country. In his relief, he is restored to health, and in gratitude he makes her "Countess Zoftig" - she has attained social position. She then reveals that she had given him poisoned wine so he wouldn't suffer. The Prince suddenly dies, but Belle now has wealth, culture, and social position and can return to Noble.

Noble, now governor of both North Dakota and South Dakota, agrees to marry Belle, and, in celebration, she suggests that he take a toast of champagne despite being a lifelong teetotaler. This causes him to become alcoholic, and he is impeached. Ashamed, he leaves Belle. Devastated, she returns to Baby and marries George, where they now live in The Bluff ("Here's to Us"). As Belle hosts a party ("Here's to Us"), George encounters Noble, now a drunken bum, outside their home. He encourages him to return to Belle, but Noble instead flees to find a way to regain himself.

After Belle finishes her story for the autobiography, Baby announces she and Noble Junior (whom Noble had while with Ramona) are getting married. Patrick Dennis announces he is done with his research, but right then Miss Eggleston bursts in with a gun, intent on killing Belle for ruining her life and her son. She and Belle struggle with the gun, and it goes off just as Noble, newly sober, steps into the room. At first it appears Noble was shot, but then it is revealed that she shot George, who dies. Their "I Love You Theme" playing, Belle decides to marry Noble even though he no longer has wealth, culture, and social position and they all live happily ever after ("Finale Act II").

Note: As scripted, the same actor portrays Noble, Pinchley, Val, Fred, Schnitzler, Prince Cherney and Noble Junior.

== Musical numbers ==
=== Original Numbers ===
Act I

- Overture - Orchestra
- The Truth — Older Belle, Patrick Dennis and Servants
- The Other Side of the Tracks — Belle
- The Rich Kids' Rag — Orchestra
- I Love You — Noble Eggleston and Belle
- The Other Side of the Tracks (Reprise) — Belle
- Deep Down Inside — Mr. Pinchley, Belle, Pinchley Junior and Poor People
- Be a Performer — Benny Buchsbaum and Bernie Buchsbaum
- Dimples — Belle and Police Escort
- Boom-Boom — Val du Val and Val du Val-ettes
- I've Got Your Number — George Musgrove and Belle
- Real Live Girl — Fred Poitrine
- Real Live Girl (Reprise) — The Doughboys
- Boom-Boom (Reprise) — Belle and Val du Val
- Finale Act I: Boom-Boom - Belle

Act II

- Entr'acte - Orchestra
- I Love (Sinking) You (Reprise) — Belle and Noble
- Poor Little Hollywood Star — Belle
- Be a Performer (Reprise) - Benny Buchsbaum and Bernie Buchsbaum
- Little Me — Older Belle and Belle
- Goodbye (The Prince's Farewell) — Prince Cherney, Yulnick, Doctor and Loyal Subjects
- Here's to Us — Miss Poitrine, Today and Guests
- Finale Act II: Here's to Us - Older Belle and Company

=== 1982 Revival ===
Act I

- Don't Ask a Lady - Belle
- The Other Side of the Tracks — Belle
- The Rich Kids' Rag — Company
- I Love You — Noble Eggleston, Belle, and Company
- The Other Side of the Tracks (Reprise) — Belle
- Deep Down Inside — Pinchley Junior, Belle and Company
- Boom-Boom — Val du Val
- I've Got Your Number — Frankie Polo
- Real Live Girl — Fred Poitrine
- Real Live Girl (Reprise) — The Doughboys

Act II

- I Love You (Reprise) — Belle and Noble
- I Wanna Be Yours — Mr. Worst and Belle
- Little Me — Belle and Mama
- Goodbye — Prince Cherney, Yulnick, Doctor and Loyal Subjects
- Here's to Us — Belle and Company
- Finale — Noble Eggleston and Miss Poitrine, Today

=== 1998 Revival ===
Act I

- Overture - Orchestra
- Little Me - Belle and Belle's Boys
- The Other Side of the Tracks (Slow) — Belle
- The Other Side of the Tracks (Fast) - Belle
- The Rich Kid Rag — Orchestra
- I Love You — Noble Eggleston, Belle, and Company
- The Other Side of the Tracks (Reprise) — Belle
- Deep Down Inside — Amos Pinchly, Pinchley Junior, Belle and Company
- Be a Performer! - Benny Buchsbaum, Bernie Buchsbaum and Belle
- Dimples - Belle and Chain Gang
- Boom-Boom — Val du Val and Boom-Boom Girls
- I've Got Your Number — Lucky
- Real Live Girl — Fred Poitrine
- Real Live Girl (Reprise) — Fred Poitrine and Soldiers
- Boom-Boom (Reprise) - Belle and Val du Val
- Finale Act I: Boom-Boom - Belle

Act II

- Entr'acte - Orchestra
- I Love (Sinking) You (Reprise) — Belle and Noble
- Poor Little Hollywood Star - Belle
- Goodbye — Prince Cherney, Yulnick, Doctor and Loyal Subjects
- Here's to Us — Belle and Company
- Finale Act II: I Love You — Noble Eggleston and Miss Poitrine, Today

=== Cut songs ===
- The Gift of a Second Chance — Belle
- Mama's Little Girl — Mama and Belle (cut during previews)
- Smart People Stay Single — The Buchsbaum Brothers and The Potter Sisters (cut during previews)

== Characters ==
- Belle Poitrine — the heroine, née Schlumpfert. Played by two women, Older Belle and Younger Belle in the original version, and by one woman in the Martin Short revival.

The Men in Belle's Life (Typically all played by the same actor)

- Noble Eggleston — Belle's true love
- Amos Pinchley — a rich old man
- Val du Val — an entertainer
- Fred Poitrine — a World War I private
- Philip Randolph Worst — an eccentric millionaire. Present only in the Garber and Coco revival.
- Otto Schnitzler — a movie director
- Prince Cherney — a prince
- Noble Junior — Noble's son

Note: Some productions have given the lead actor the roles of Patrick Dennis and George Musgrove.

- Bernie and Bennie Buchsbaum — Two theatrical producers who take advantage of Belle's notoriety to make her a vaudeville star (despite her lack of talent) and later produce her self-financed film career.
- George Musgrove — a young, handsome gambler who falls in love with Belle. Renamed Frankie Polo, the gangster, in the Garber and Coco revival, and Lucky Malone in the Martin Short revival.
- Patrick Dennis — A famous writer, ghost-writing Belle's autobiography.
- Mrs. Eggleston — Noble's mother. Her first name, Flo, is only given in the Garber and Coco revival. Often played in drag.
- Momma — mother of Belle. A hooker with a heart of gold. Often also portrays Mrs. Eggleston. Her first name, Tallulah, is only given in the Garber and Coco revival.
- Ramona — Noble's fiancée, chosen by his mother.
- Brucey — Noble's sycophantic, arrogant sidekick.
- Yulnick — Prince Cherney's aide.
- Butler/Hairdressers — At Belle Poitrine's Southampton house (present only in the original production).
- Junior — Mr. Pinchley's son.
- Mrs. Kepplewhite — Mr. Pinchley's bookkeeper.
- Nurse — Mr. Pinchley's nurse.

== Casts ==
Role	Original Broadway Production (1962)	National Tour (1964)	Original London Production (1964)	First Broadway Revival (1982)	London Revival (1984)	Second Broadway Revival (1998)	Encores Production (2014)
The Men of Belle's Life	Sid Caesar	Sid Caesar	Bruce Forsyth	Victor Garber & James Coco	Russ Abbot	Martin Short	Christian Borle
Younger Belle	Virginia Martin	Virginia Martin	Eileen Gourlay	Mary Gordon Murray	Sheila White	Faith Prince	Rachel York
Older Belle	Nancy Andrews	Nancy Andrews	Avril Angers	Jessica James	Lynda Baron	Faith Prince	Judy Kaye
George Musgrove (Frankie Polo/Lucky)	Swen Swenson	Swen Swenson	Swen Swenson	Don Correia	Tudor Davies	Michael Park	Tony Yazbeck
Patrick Dennis	Peter Turgeon	Grant Walden	David Henderson-Tate	N/A	N/A	N/A	David Garrison
Bennie Buchsbaum	Mort Marshall	Lou Cutell	Laurie Webb	Don Correia	N/A	Martin Short	Lewis J. Stadlen
Bernie Buchsbaum	Joey Faye	Maurice Brenner	Jack Francois	James Brennan	N/A	Michael McGrath	Lee Wilkof
Mrs. Eggleston	Nancy Cushman	Edith Gresham	Enid Lowe	James Coco	Vivienne Martin	Ruth Williamson	Harriet Harris
Momma	Adnia Rice	Alice Nunn	Bee Duffell	Mary Small	Valerie Walsh	Ruth Williamson	Gaelen Gilliland

== Recordings ==
The Original Broadway Cast Recording was released by RCA Victor in 1962; a CD was released on March 9, 1993. A London Cast recording (1964 cast) was released by Drg on July 27, 1993. The New Broadway Cast Recording of the 1998 revival was released by Varèse Sarabande on March 9, 1999.

== Awards and nominations ==
=== Original Broadway production ===
Year	Award	Category	Nominee	Result
1963	Tony Award	Best Musical		Nominated
1963	Tony Award	Best Author	Neil Simon	Nominated
1963	Tony Award	Best Original Score	Cy Coleman and Carolyn Leigh	Nominated
1963	Tony Award	Best Performance by a Leading Actor in a Musical	Sid Caesar	Nominated
1963	Tony Award	Best Performance by a Featured Actor in a Musical	Swen Swenson	Nominated
1963	Tony Award	Best Performance by a Featured Actress in a Musical	Virginia Martin	Nominated
1963	Tony Award	Best Direction of a Musical	Cy Feuer and Bob Fosse	Nominated
1963	Tony Award	Best Choreography	Bob Fosse	Won
1963	Tony Award	Best Producer of a Musical	Cy Feuer and Ernest Martin	Nominated
1963	Tony Award	Best Costume Design	Robert Fletcher	Nominated
1963	Theatre World Award		Swen Swenson	Won

=== 1982 Broadway revival ===
Year	Award	Category	Nominee	Result
1982	Tony Award	Best Performance by a Leading Actor in a Musical	Victor Garber	Nominated
1982	Tony Award	Best Performance by a Leading Actress in a Musical	Mary Gordon Murray	Nominated
1982	Tony Award	Best Choreography	Peter Gennaro	Nominated

=== 1998 Broadway revival ===
Year	Award	Category	Nominee	Result
1999	Tony Award	Best Revival of a Musical		Nominated
1999	Tony Award	Best Performance by a Leading Actor in a Musical	Martin Short	Won
1999	Tony Award	Best Choreography	Rob Marshall	Nominated
1999	Tony Award	Best Orchestrations	Harold Wheeler	Nominated
1999	Drama Desk Award	Outstanding Actor in a Musical	Martin Short	Nominated
1999	Drama Desk Award	Outstanding Choreography	Rob Marshall	Nominated
