= Swen Swenson =

American dancer and singer

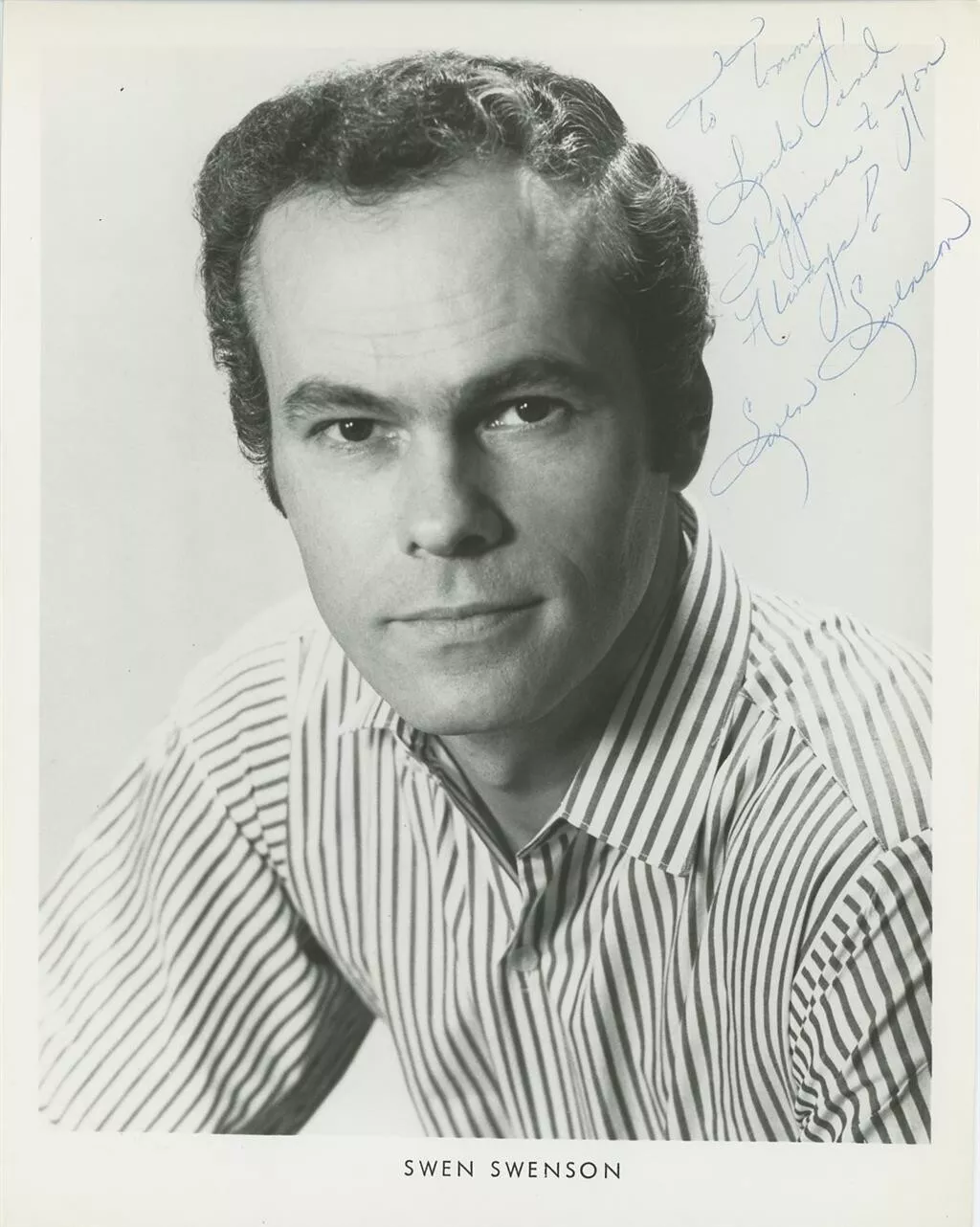
Autographed press photo of Swenson, circa 1967.

Swen Swenson (January 23, 1930 - June 23, 1993) was a Broadway dancer and singer. Born in Inwood, Iowa, Swenson was trained by dancer Mira Rostova and at the School of American Ballet.

Openly gay, he had featured and co-starring roles on Broadway in such musicals such as Wildcat with Lucille Ball, Little Me (for which he received a Tony Award nomination, and in which he introduced the standard "I've Got Your Number"), A Joyful Noise, Annie, No, No Nanette, I Remember Mama and the 1981 revival of Can-Can. He appeared in movies and on television variety shows, including Your Show of Shows and The Ed Sullivan Show.

Swenson died in 1993 of AIDS-related illness.
