= Play On! =

Musical by Cheryl West and Duke Ellington

- Original Cast Recording Artwork
- Music: Duke Ellington
- Lyrics: Various (see below)
- Book: Cheryl L. West
- Basis: Twelfth Night by William Shakespeare
- Premiere: September 1996: Old Globe Theatre, San Diego
- Productions: 1996 San Diego; 1997 Broadway; 2024 UK tour

Play On! is a musical adaptation of Shakespeare's Twelfth Night, featuring the music of Duke Ellington, conceived by Sheldon Epps, with a book by Cheryl L. West. The musical relocates the story from Illyria to 1940s Swing-era Harlem.

Premiering at the Old Globe Theatre in San Diego, the production moved to Broadway at the Brooks Atkinson Theatre in 1997. The New York production received three nominations at the 51st Tony Awards, including for performances by Tonya Pinkins and André De Shields.

== Production history ==
The original production, conceived by director Sheldon Epps, premiered in San Diego at the Old Globe Theatre in September 1996. The show then opened March 20, 1997, at the Brooks Atkinson Theatre on Broadway, where it ran for 61 performances. The cast included Tonya Pinkins, André De Shields, Carl Anderson, Yvette Cason, and Angela Robinson. An original cast recording was released on May 20, 1997, on Varèse Sarabande.

A 1999 production of Play On! at the Pasadena Playhouse was recorded for the PBS series Great Performances.

Talawa Theatre Company produced a UK tour directed by Michael Buffong, beginning September 2024 at Belgrade Theatre, Coventry, then Liverpool Playhouse, Salisbury Playhouse, Birmingham Hippodrome, Lyric Theatre, Hammersmith, and Bristol Old Vic.

== Synopsis ==
Vy comes to swinging 1940s Harlem to write songs for the Duke, Harlem's greatest band leader. To overcome the sexist barriers of the time against women songwriters, she disguises herself as a man, Vy-man. She finds the Duke in tears over his loss of Lady Liv, Harlem's "queen of the blues". The Duke likes Vy-man's music, so he instructs the songwriter to go to the Cotton Club and present one of her songs as if it were a new song written by the Duke for Lady Liv. Once Lady Liv finds Vy-man to be quite charming, a series of mistaken pairings ensue.

Meanwhile, Jester and several other Cotton Club performers are rebelling against the overly serious and tyrannical club manager, Rev. Since Rev has a crush on Lady Liv, the performers persuade him that he should woo her by learning to swing and scat, giving up his old fashioned ballads. More confusion results before the truth is revealed, and the couples are appropriately united.

== Cast ==
Character	Broadway
Character	1997
Duke	Carl Anderson
Miss Mary	Yvette Cason
Jester	André De Shields
Vy	Cheryl Freeman
Lady Liv	Tonya Pinkins
Rev	Lawrence Hamilton

== Musical numbers ==
Act 1

- "Take the A Train" (Music and Lyrics by Billy Strayhorn)
- "Drop Me Off in Harlem" (Music by Duke Ellington, Lyrics by Nick Kenny)
- "I've Got to Be a Rug Cutter" (Music and Lyrics by Duke Ellington)
- "I Let a Song Go Out of My Heart" (Music and Lyrics by Duke Ellington, Irving Mills, Henry Nemo, John Redmond)
- "C Jam Blues" (Music by Duke Ellington)
- "Mood Indigo" (Music and Lyrics by Duke Ellington, Irving Mills, Albany Bigard)
- "Don't Get Around Much Anymore" (Music by Duke Ellington, Lyrics by Bob Russell)
- "Don't You Know I Care" (Music by Duke Ellington, Lyrics by Mack David)
- "It Don't Mean a Thing (If It Ain't Got That Swing)" (Music by Duke Ellington. Lyrics by Irving Mills)
- "I Got It Bad and That Ain't Good" (from Jump For Joy) (Music by Duke Ellington. Lyrics by Paul Francis Webster)
- "Hit Me With a Hot Note and Watch Me Bounce" (Music by Duke Ellington. Lyrics by Don George)
- "I'm Just a Lucky So-and-So" (Music by Duke Ellington. Lyrics by Mack David)
- "Everything But You" (Music and Lyrics by Duke Ellington, Don George, Harry James)
- "Solitude" (Music and Lyrics by Duke Ellington, Eddie DeLange, Irving Mills)

Act 2

- "Black Butterfly" (Music and Lyrics by Duke Ellington, Ben Carruthers, Irving Mills)
- "I Ain't Got Nothin' But the Blues" (Music by Duke Ellington. Lyrics by Don George)
- "I'm Beginning to See the Light" (Music by Duke Ellington, Don George, Harry James, Johnny Hodges)
- "I Got It Bad and That Ain't Good" (reprise)
- "I Didn't Know About You" (Music by Duke Ellington. Lyrics by Bob Russell)
- "Rocks in My Bed" (Music and Lyrics by Duke Ellington)
- "Something to Live For" (Music by Duke Ellington. Lyrics by Billy Strayhorn)
- "Love You Madly" (Music and Lyrics by Duke Ellington)
- "Prelude to a Kiss" (Music and Lyrics by Duke Ellington, Irving Gordon, Irving Mills)
- "In a Mellow Tone" (Music by Duke Ellington. Lyrics by Milt Gabler)

== Awards and nominations ==
=== Original Broadway production ===
Year	Award	Category	Nominee	Result
1997	Tony Award	Best Performance by a Featured Actor in a Musical	André DeShields	Nominated
1997	Tony Award	Best Performance by a Leading Actress in a Musical	Tonya Pinkins	Nominated
1997	Tony Award	Best Orchestrations	Luther Henderson	Nominated
1997	Drama Desk Award	Outstanding Featured Actor in a Musical	André DeShields	Nominated
1997	Drama League Award	Outstanding Production of a Musical	Play On!	Nominated
