= Richard Pilbrow =

British lighting designer (1933–2023)

Richard Pilbrow (28 April 1933 – 6 December 2023) was a British stage lighting designer, author, theatre design consultant, and theatrical producer, film producer and television producer. He was the first British lighting designer to light a Broadway musical on the Broadway stage with the musical Zorba.

== Early life ==
Pilbrow was born in Beckenham, Kent, England. In the 1950s, Pilbrow entered the Central School of Speech and Drama in London as a stage management student after serving two years in the Royal Air Force.

== Career ==
In 1957, Pilbrow co-founded the lighting rental company Theatre Projects with Bryan Kendall, which expanded to include a production company in 1963 to produce and mount the London production of Stephen Sondheim’s first musical A Funny Thing Happened On the Way to the Forum with set designer Tony Walton and American Producer Hal Prince. In 1963 Pilbrow became lighting director to Laurence Olivier for the National Theatre at Chichester and the Old Vic Theatre. From 1966 he joined the National Theatre Building Committee and the following year was appointed theatre consultant to the new National Theatre on the South Bank. He was responsible for the stage design, backstage planning and all the performance equipment design (with Richard Brett) of the Olivier and Lyttelton Theatres. Theatre Projects Consultants, with Iain Mackintosh, was responsible for the design of the Cottesloe (now Dorfman) Theatre. Theatre Projects Consultants, which designs theatres and performing arts buildings, has gone on to design world-renowned spaces such as the Steppenwolf Theatre in Chicago, the Kimmel Center for the Performing Arts in Philadelphia, and the Walt Disney Concert Hall in Los Angeles, on which he wrote a book. Pilbrow was chairman Emeritus of the firm.

Pilbrow was one of the four founders of 69 Theatre Company, at Manchester's University Theatre, along with Caspar Wrede, Michael Elliott and Braham Murray.

Pilbrow worked on Broadway for the first time as the projection designer, with lighting designer Jean Rosenthal of Prince's A Funny Thing Happened on the Way to the Forum. A year later, his second projection assignment on Broadway with Golden Boy allowed him to work with lighting designer Tharon Musser. Also in 1964, Pilbrow and Robert Ornbo were the first English lighting designers to ever be invited to join the United Scenic Artists. Pilbrow went on to light eleven Broadway shows—earning Tony nominations for Four Baboons Adoring the Sun and The Life.

In 1970, he published the book Stage Lighting which is still a standard textbook in lighting design programs in both America and Britain. A later book, Stage Lighting Design: The Art, The Craft, The Life, was published in 1997, with a second edition releasing in September 2008. In 2011 his autobiographical account "A Theatre Project — A Backstage Story" was published.

In 1974 he produced the film Swallows and Amazons.

Pillbrow was the lighting designer for the 2008 Jill Santoriello musical adaptation of A Tale of Two Cities at the Al Hirschfeld Theatre on Broadway. He won the 1995 Drama Desk Award for Outstanding Lighting Design for Show Boat and was nominated for the same award for A Tale of Two Cities in 2009.

National Life Stories conducted an oral history interview (C1173/06) with Hudson in 2006 for its An Oral History of Theatre Design collection held by the British Library.

Pilbrow was a joint founder in the Association of British Theatre Technicians, Institute of Theatre Consultants, The Society of British Theatre Designers and (with Leonard ‘Lennie’ Tucker) the Society of British Lighting Designers, now known as the Association of Lighting Designers. Pilbrow served two terms on the United States Institute for Theatre Technology's (USITT) Directors at Large and was also elected a Fellow of the Institute in 2001. He was a Fellow of the Hong Kong Academy for the Performing Arts and London's Central School of Speech and Drama.

== Death ==
Pilbrow died on 6 December 2023, at the age of 90.

== Awards ==
- Drama Desk Award Show Boat (1997)
- Outer Critics Award Show Boat (1997)
- Dora Award Show Boat (1997)
- NAACP Award for Lighting Show Boat (1997)
- Theatre Crafts International Lighting Product of the Year (1998)
- Distinguished Lifetime Achievement Award in Lighting Design from the United States Institute for Theatre Technology (1999)
- Association of British Theatre Technicians Technician of the Year (2000)
- Lighting Designer of the Year by Lighting Dimensions Magazine (2005)
- The Wally Russell Foundation Wally Russell Lifetime Achievement Award (2008)

== Publications ==
- Stage Lighting (1970)
- Walt Disney Concert Hall: The Backstage Story (2003)
- Stage Lighting Design: The Art, The Craft, The Life (1997 & 2008)
- A Theatre Project (2011)
- A Sense of Theatre (2024)

== Broadway lighting design credits ==
- A Tale of Two Cities (2008)
- Our Town (2002)
- The Life (1997)
- Show Boat (1994)
- Tango Pasión (1993)
- Four Baboons Adoring the Sun (1992)
- Shelter (1973)
- The Rothschilds (1970)
- Zorba (1968)
- Rosencrantz and Guildenstern Are Dead (1967)
- Golden Boy (1964)

== Theatre projects consultants: theatre design consulting projects of note ==
Partial list of projects.

- National Theatre, London
- Kauffman Performing Arts Center, Kansas City, Missouri http://www.kauffmancenter.org
- Dallas Center for the Performing Arts, Dallas, Texas
- Walt Disney Concert Hall, Los Angeles, California
- Richard B. Fisher Center for the Arts, Bard College Annandale-on-Hudson, New York
- New Amsterdam Theater renovation, New York City
- Kimmel Center for the Performing Arts, Philadelphia, Pennsylvania
- Geary Theater renovation, San Francisco, California
- Seiji Ozawa Hall, Tanglewood Lenox, Massachusetts
- Cerritos Center for the Performing Arts, Cerritos, California
- San Jose Repertory Theatre, San Jose, California
- Epcor Centre for the Performing Arts, Calgary, Alberta, Canada
- Portland Center for the Performing Arts, Portland, Oregon
- North Carolina Blumenthal Performing Arts Center, Charlotte, North Carolina
- Steppenwolf Theater, Chicago, Illinois
- Chicago Shakespeare Theater, Chicago, Illinois
- The Goodman Theatre, Chicago, Illinois
