= The Life (musical) =

- Original Cast Recording
- Music: Cy Coleman
- Lyrics: Ira Gasman
- Book: David Newman; Ira Gasman; Cy Coleman
- Productions: 1990 Off-Broadway; 1997 Broadway; 2017 London
- Awards: Drama Desk Award for Outstanding Musical; Outer Critics Circle Award for Outstanding New Broadway Musical

The Life is a musical with a book by David Newman, Ira Gasman and Cy Coleman, music by Coleman, and lyrics by Gasman.

Based on an original idea by Gasman, the show explores the underbelly of Times Square's 42nd Street, inhabited by pimps and prostitutes, druggies and dealers, and runaways and street people in the era prior to its Disneyfication.

== Background ==
Ira Gasman recalls walking on 42nd Street (in New York City) and seeing an arrest: "What theatre, I thought, right there in the street! It got me thinking about this show." After the Off-Broadway production in 1990, in 1994 Coleman and Gasman asked David Newman to help rewrite the show. Newman stated that, "Whatever it was back when they did the workshop, it's totally different now ..." Coleman brought in the director Michael Blakemore, who "steered the show along a tightrope, careful not to fall into the seediness below, toward a common humanity to which audiences can relate."

== Productions ==
The show was first produced at the Off-Broadway Westbeth Theatre, running from July 30, 1990 to August 16, 1990. Joe Layton directed and choreographed, with a cast that featured Chuck Cooper, Lillias White, Lori Fischer and Mamie Duncan-Gibbs.

The Broadway production, directed by Michael Blakemore, opened on April 26, 1997, at the Ethel Barrymore Theatre, where it closed on June 7, 1998, after 466 performances and 21 previews. Among the large cast were Pamela Isaacs, Chuck Cooper, Bellamy Young, Lillias White, and Sam Harris, winner of the first Star Search television competition in 1984. Choreography was by Joey McKneely, scenic design by Robin Wagner, costume design by Martin Pakledinaz, and lighting design by Richard Pilbrow.

White and Cooper both won 1997 Tony Awards for their performances in this production as Featured Actress in a Musical and Featured Actor in a Musical, respectively.

The US Regional premiere took place at The Heights Theatre in Houston, Texas in April 1999. Directed by Ron Jones and choreographed by Jim Williams, with musical direction by Stephen Jones, the show featured Tamara Siler as Queen, Mia Fisher as Sonja, Illich Guardiola as Fleetwood, L. Jay Meyer as Lou, Johanna Beth Harris as Mary, Bob Beare as Lacy, and Jonathan McVey as JoJo.

The show had its UK premiere at London's Southwark Playhouse in March 2017 to coincide with the show's 20th anniversary on Broadway. This production was again directed by Michael Blakemore, with casting by Anne Vosser, and starred Sharon D. Clarke as Sonja and Cornell S. John as Memphis, T'Shan Williams as Queen, David Albury as Fleetwood, John Addison as Jojo, Lawrence Carmichael as Snickers, Jo Servi as Lacy, Jalisa Andrews as Chi Chi, Matthew Caputo as Oddjob, Omari Douglas as Slick, Aisha Jawando as Carmen, Thomas-Lee Kidd as Bobby/Dance Captain, Charlotte Reavey as April, Lucinda Shaw as Tracy, Johnathan Tweedie as Theodore, and Joanna Woodward as Mary. The production received out of five Offies four: Best Musical Production, Best Female in a Musical (Williams), Best Supporting Female (D. Clarke) and Best Supporting Male (S. John).

In March 2022, New York City Center ENCORES! presented a concert adaptation of the musical, adapted and directed by Billy Porter, in his directorial debut. This production significantly adapted the script and structure, changing the musical into a flashback narrated by an older Jojo, and rearranging several of the numbers, and providing more backstory to several characters. The production starred Alexandra Grey as Queen, Antwayn Hopper as Memphis, Mykal Kilgore as Young JoJo, Ledisi as Sonja, Erika Olson as Mary, Destan Owens as Old JoJo, and Ken Robinson as Fleetwood. Reviews for the production were largely negative, with criticisms of the addition of "preachy" dialogue and the extended runtime, though reviewers were receptive to the intention to add more context to the narrative of mostly Black sex workers. However, Ledisi's performance was highly praised, and the musical shift to more "funkadelic" arrangements of Coleman's score received mixed reception.

The Los Angeles Premiere was produced by Jaxx Theatricals at the Stella Adler Theatre, running from December 3rd through the 21st in 2008. Joe Greene directed and Paul Romero Jr. choreographed, with a cast that featured Willam, Dionne Gipson, Ethan LePhong and David St. Louis. The show was produced by Jaxx Theatricals co-founders Justine Baldwin, Mark Espinosa & Jeremy Lucas. Original Cast Member Sam Harris attended.

== Synopsis ==
=== Act I ===
The Life depicts the pulsating life on the Times Square streets in the 1980s, where everything had a price, especially sex—the garish topless bars, the transvestite joints, the hookers who worked the side walks at the bidding of their pimps ("Check It Out!").

Jojo, an opportunistic, conniving white hustler in the thick of the action, has a bare knuckled plan for feeding his ambition ("Use What You Got"). But among these unsavoury characters there are appealing people who have been caught in the web of these sordid surroundings. Sonja, a veteran hooker who has seen better days, befriends Queen who is on the street because her man, Fleetwood, a displaced Vietnam veteran, needs her support. She has saved her money and on this day plans to get away with Fleetwood and leave the life for good, enjoying, with Sonja ("A Lovely Day to Be Out of Jail"). Returning to her hotel room, Queen discovers that Fleetwood has spent half of her savings to pay off his drug debts and feed his habit.

Fleetwood has an unrealistic dream of attaining power and money ("A Piece of the Action"). Jojo tells him he'll never amount to anything as a pimp as long as he's romantically involved with the woman he's selling. Jojo takes him to the Port Authority where they find Mary, just off the bus from Minnesota, a girl with the mien of an angel but, as we eventually find out, she's no angel. Jojo grabs at her suitcase so that Fleetwood can rescue it and become her hero.

The demi-monde hangs out at a bar owned by Lacy, who has seen it all but has certain affection for his clientele. In the company of her sister whores, Sonja bemoans the wear and tear of her life ("The Oldest Profession"). When Fleetwood and Mary arrive, Memphis, the "biggest businessman on the block" comments on the professionalism of his trade and soon zeroes in on the newcomer ("Don't Take Much"). Reluctantly, Queen takes Mary to the room she shares with Fleetwood and tries to persuade her to go home ("Go Home"). Later, as prostitutes eye potential customers, a gospel group parades by ("You Can't Get to Heaven"). The girls defiantly stand up for themselves ("My Body"), while the pimps complain about the harassment of the police ("Why Don't They Leave Us Alone?").

Jojo cajoles Mary into taking a turn as a go-go dancer. A smashing success, she celebrates her good fortune with Fleetwood and Jojo, who has her in mind for his "mentor" Lou, a gaudy Los Angeles producer of "motion pictures" of the triple X genre, who's looking for fresh corn-fed talent ("Easy Money").

Once again in jail, Queen reflects on her attachment to Fleetwood ("He's No Good"); while, enticed by Mary, Jojo and Fleetwood spend the night with her in a threesome. As Fleetwood turns his attentions toward Mary, Memphis makes his move to put "Queen in his deck". Queen discovers what's been going on between Fleetwood and Mary, and decides she's finally had enough ("I'm Leaving You"). As everyone parties at The Hookers' Ball, Lou makes off with Mary, while Queen, shunning Fleetwood, attaches herself to Memphis ("The Hooker's Ball").

=== Act II ===
Over a game of Three-card Monte ("Step Right Up"), Jojo and the pimps discuss their "silent partner", Mr. Greed ("Mr. Greed"). In Memphis' spacious apartment, Queen thanks him for getting her out of jail and for the beautiful dress he gave her to wear to the Hookers' Ball; but Memphis makes it very clear that the dress was a $6,000 loan that she must repay with her earnings ("My Way or the Highway"). He warns Queen that she better not leave town "cause you'll be coming back real soon for a funeral – Fleetwood's; followed shortly by your own".

Queen tells Sonja that she must find Fleetwood and warn him about Memphis' threat. She asks Jojo to tell Fleetwood to meet her the next morning at Lacy's. Meanwhile, Mary, with Lou, toasts her acceptance of his offer of a movie career ("People Magazine").

The next morning Jojo double crosses Queen and comes to Lacy's with Memphis, who brutally flogs the terrified woman. When Fleetwood arrives, Queen reminds him of what they once had together ("We Had a Dream"). When Fleetwood returns to his hotel, he finds Mary leaving for Los Angeles.

Near the Lincoln Tunnel, Memphis' henchman, Snickers, pushes Queen to get "plenty of action tonight. Memphis is dependin' on it" ("Use What You Got" (Reprise)). She, Sonja and other girls share their hopes for the future ("'Someday' is for Suckers").

Later, near the Hudson River in a spot once special to Queen and Fleetwood, Sonja hands Queen a bus ticket and a suitcase in a desperate attempt to get her away from Memphis. Fleetwood unexpectedly appears and tries to talk Queen into making a new start ("We Gotta Go"), but Queen bitterly rejects him. Jojo guides Memphis onto the scene. Fleetwood pulls a gun on Memphis, but Jojo knocks the gun loose as Memphis mortally stabs Fleetwood; Queen seizes the fallen gun and shoots Memphis. Sonja decides to take the rap for killing Memphis, claiming self-defence; she and Queen say goodbye ("My Friend"), then Queen departs for the bus, which will carry her to freedom, as Sonja surrenders to the police. ("Check It Out!" (Reprise))

== Songs ==
Act I

- "Check It Out!" – Cue and Company
- "Use What You Got" – Jojo and Company
- "A Lovely Day to Be Out of Jail" – Queen and Sonja
- "A Piece of the Action" – Fleetwood
- "The Oldest Profession" – Sonja
- "Don't Take Much" – Memphis
- "Go Home" – Queen and Mary
- “Patsette, you whore” — Betska and Sonja
- "You Can't Get to Heaven" – Queen, Sonja and Street Evangelists
- "My Body" – Frenchie, Chichi, Tracy, Carmen, Sonja, Queen and April
- "Why Don't They Leave Us Alone?" – Company
- "Easy Money" – Mary, Jojo and Fleetwood
- "He's No Good" – Queen
- "I'm Leaving You" – Queen
- "The Hooker's Ball" – Lacy and Company

Act II

- "Step Right Up" – Enrique, Slick, Oddjob and Bobby
- "Mr. Greed" – Jojo, Bobby, Enrique, Oddjob and Slick
- "My Way or the Highway" – Memphis and Queen
- "People Magazine" – Lou and Mary
- "We Had a Dream" – Queen
- "Use What You Got" (Reprise) – Mary, Lou and Jojo
- "'Someday' is for Suckers" – Sonja, Frenchie, April, Shatellia, Carmen and Chichi
- "We Gotta Go" – Fleetwood and Queen
- "My Friend" – Queen and Sonja
- "Check It Out!" (Reprise) – Company

== Awards and nominations ==
=== Original Broadway production ===
Year	Award	Category	Nominee	Result
1997	Tony Award	Best Musical		Nominated
1997	Tony Award	Best Book of a Musical	Cy Coleman, Ira Gasman and David Newman	Nominated
1997	Tony Award	Best Original Score	Cy Coleman and Ira Gasman	Nominated
1997	Tony Award	Best Performance by a Leading Actress in a Musical	Pamela Isaacs	Nominated
1997	Tony Award	Best Performance by a Featured Actor in a Musical	Chuck Cooper	Won
1997	Tony Award	Best Performance by a Featured Actor in a Musical	Sam Harris	Nominated
1997	Tony Award	Best Performance by a Featured Actress in a Musical	Lillias White	Won
1997	Tony Award	Best Direction of a Musical	Michael Blakemore	Nominated
1997	Tony Award	Best Choreography	Joey McKneely	Nominated
1997	Tony Award	Best Orchestrations	Don Sebesky and Harold Wheeler	Nominated
1997	Tony Award	Best Costume Design	Martin Pakledinaz	Nominated
1997	Tony Award	Best Lighting Design	Richard Pilbrow	Nominated
1997	Drama Desk Award	Outstanding Musical		Won
1997	Drama Desk Award	Outstanding Actress in a Musical	Pamela Isaacs	Nominated
1997	Drama Desk Award	Outstanding Featured Actor in a Musical	Sam Harris	Nominated
1997	Drama Desk Award	Outstanding Featured Actress in a Musical	Lillias White	Won
1997	Drama Desk Award	Outstanding Director of a Musical	Michael Blakemore	Nominated
1997	Drama Desk Award	Outstanding Orchestrations	Don Sebesky and Harold Wheeler	Nominated
1997	Drama Desk Award	Outstanding Music	Cy Coleman	Won
1997	Drama Desk Award	Outstanding Costume Design	Martin Pakledinaz	Nominated
1997	Drama Desk Award	Outstanding Lighting Design	Richard Pilbrow	Nominated
1997	Drama League Award	Outstanding Production of a Musical		Won
1997	New York Drama Critics' Circle Award	Best Musical	Cy Coleman, Ira Gasman and David Newman	Runner-up
1997	Outer Critics Circle Award	Outstanding New Broadway Musical		Won
1997	Outer Critics Circle Award	Outstanding Actor in a Musical	Sam Harris	Nominated
1997	Outer Critics Circle Award	Outstanding Actress in a Musical	Pamela Isaacs	Nominated
1997	Outer Critics Circle Award	Outstanding Featured Actor in a Musical	Chuck Cooper	Nominated
1997	Outer Critics Circle Award	Outstanding Featured Actor in a Musical	Kevin Ramsey	Nominated
1997	Outer Critics Circle Award	Outstanding Featured Actress in a Musical	Lillias White	Won
1997	Outer Critics Circle Award	Outstanding Director of a Musical	Michael Blakemore	Nominated
1997	Outer Critics Circle Award	Outstanding Choreography	Joey McKneely	Nominated

=== Original London production ===
Year	Award	Category	Nominee	Result
2018	Offie	Musical Production		Won
2018	Offie	New Musical		Nominated
2018	Offie	Female in a Musical	T'Shan Williams	Won
2018	Offie	Supporting Female in a Musical	Sharon D. Clarke	Won
2018	Offie	Supporting Male in a Musical	Cornell S. John	Won
