= Teri Thornton =

American jazz singer (1934–2000)

- Born: Shirley Enid Avery; September 1, 1934; Detroit, Michigan
- Died: May 2, 2000 (aged 65); Englewood, New Jersey
- Other name: Terri Summers
- Occupations: Singer, pianist, music composer
- Children: 3
- Parents: Robert Avery (father); Bernice Crews Avery (mother)

Teri Thornton (born Shirley Enid Avery, September 1, 1934 – May 2, 2000) was an American jazz singer, music composer and pianist. She was known for recording several albums in the 1960's with a career spanning over four decades and composing several songs. She was also known for her work with musicians such as Duke Ellington, Clark Terry, Johnny Griffin, and Cannonball Adderley. Adderley called her "the best voice since Ella Fitzgerald". Ella Fitzgerald herself even told Downbeat Magazine that Thornton "was her favorite singer".

== Early life ==
Teri Thornton was born Shirley Enid Avery on September 1, 1934 in Detroit, Michigan, the only child of Robert Avery, a pullman porter and Bernice Crews Avery, a choir director and singer and the host of a local radio show. Her mothers' involvement in the local Detroit music scene as well as her grandmother being an evangelist at the local Methodist Episcopal church exposed Thornton to gospel, jazz, and blues from a young age, which influenced her career choice as a vocalist. Thornton was encouraged by her mother to study classical music but she chose to become a vocalist instead, stating her interest in "bebop music". From around the age of three, Thornton began playing the piano by ear, picking out tunes from the radio, which included genres such as boogie-woogie and bebop. Throughout her early life growing up in Detroit, Thornton was surrounded by diverse musical influences in her neighborhood and community settings with the city being a hub of jazz and blues culture that shaped other talented vocal artists such as Betty Carter and Aretha Franklin. In high school, Thornton participated in school choirs influenced by her mother's role and entered local amateur contests and Monday night jam sessions, where she performed songs her mother favored. Thornton's vocal style was said to blend singing elements of singers such as Ella Fitzgerald, Sarah Vaughan, and Carmen McRae. Thornton's appreciation of jazz grew from listening to radio recordings from singers such as the Ink Spots and Dinah Washington.

== Career ==
After graduating high school, Thornton began her music career by performing for several years as a jazz singer and pianist in Detroit's clubs, as well as at other locations such as Cleveland's Ebony Club in 1956. She also performed at venues throughout Chicago. Thornton's piano playing was primarily influenced through musicians such as Barry Harris and Tommy Flanagan who she listened to extensively during her childhood. As a result, Thornton steadily built a local reputation as a promising vocalist and pianist. Toward the end of the 1950's, Thornton moved to New York City. Soon after, she signed with Riverside Records, becoming the only musician signed to that label. This marked a turning point for Thornton, switching her from small, local performances to attaining nationwide fame. During the 1960's, Thornton recorded jingles for radio advertisements, however, this diminished her output as a jazz vocalist, producing fewer albums during this time. Her time recording jingles also diminished her recognition as a jazz vocalist. Her sparsity in record production was primarily influenced by changes in the music industry as rock and roll became more popular and less and less jazz vocalists were appearing on the music scene. However, Thornton's career was marred by personal struggles such as poor management, alcoholism, and the economic challenges associated with being a musician, as well as being temporarily incarcerated. However, Thornton did manage to release two mildly successful records Sings Open Highway and Somewhere In the Night, the latter of which featured a song of the same name which became the theme song for the 1960's crime television series Naked City. Unfortunately, these records proved futile to keep Thornton stable financially and her contract with Columbia Records was terminated. This forced Thornton to drift across the country, looking for employment. She moved to Los Angeles briefly, singing on various records on the Preview record label (going by the names Terri North, Teri Matthews, and Teri Summers) and working as a booking agent as well as doing promotional work before returning to New York City in 1983, where she performed in smaller jazz venues such as Zinno’s and Cleopatra’s Needle and recorded several records. Despite this attempted return into the jazz music scene, her recognition as a jazz singer was fading. In the 1990s, Thornton made a grand comeback in the music scene, most notably with her winning the Thelonious Monk Institute of Jazz Vocal Competition in Washington, DC. This win re-established her recognition as a jazz musician and revived her career as a vocalist after years of obscurity and uncertainty. Thornton's triumphant return to the music scene led to increased live performances at renowned venues, including multiple engagements at the Blue Note Jazz Club in New York. In 1999, while residing at the Actors' Fund retirement home in Englewood, New Jersey, Thornton signed a contract with Verve Records and released her final album I'll Be Easy to Find, her first album in over three decades, which featured a song from the 1998 competition in Washington.

== Personal life ==
Thornton gave birth to 3 children: sons Kenneth Thornton and Kelly Glusovich, and daughter Rose McKinney-James. Thornton raised her children as a single parent in the 1960s and 1970s after an earlier divorce, while at the same time balancing other commitments, which resulted in her relocating multiple times to various cities across the United States. Thornton devoted herself to taking care of her children, rather than her career as a jazz musician.

== Death ==
In the early 90s, Thornton was diagnosed with bladder cancer which she initially fought for 3 years. The cancer returned again toward the end of the 1990s. While performing at the Bern Jazz Festival in Switzerland in 1998, she collapsed onstage and was transported to Englewood Hospital where she underwent emergency surgery, after which it was confirmed that the cancer had worsened and spread. Thornton subsequently received radiation and chemotherapy treatments. She died on May 2, 2000 at the age of 65 from complications related to the disease.

== Discography ==
Albums

- Devil May Care (Riverside, 1961)
- Sings Open Highway (Columbia, 1963)
- Somewhere in the Night (Dauntless, 1963)
- Great Jazz Artists Play Compositions Of Irving Berlin (1965, with Bill Evans, Charlie Byrd & Billy Taylor, Riverside Records)
- I'll Be Easy to Find (Verve, 1999)
- Sell Out and Move (with Rodd Keith) (M.S.R. Records)
- Terri and Rodd and the Librettos (with the Librettos) (M.S.R. Records)
- The Voice of Teri Thornton Lullaby of the Leaves (compilation album, 2016, Fresh Sound Records)

Singles (LP vinyls)

- Feelin' Fruggy (1965, composer)
- Either Way I Lose / Why Don't You Love Me (1964)
- To Remember You By / Won't Someone Please Belong To Me (1965)
- Somewhere in the Night (Naked City Theme) / Heart (1963)
- Every Time I Think About You / To Remember You By (1965)
- Where Was I? / Molly Marlene (1967)
- Lullaby of the Leaves / Devil May Care (1961)
- The Secret Life / Where Are You Love? (1964)
- Open Highway ("Route 66" Theme) / Every Time I Think About You (1963)
- You Don't Know / Cold, Cold Heart (1964)
- Either Way I Lose / Walk Hand in Hand
- Wonderful My Love / The Other Woman (1965)
- Come on Back to Detroit (1983)
