= Pamela Isaacs =

American singer and actress

Pamela Isaacs is a California-born American singer and actress.

== Theatre ==
In 1987 Isaacs appeared in Conrack, a musical based on Pat Conroy's novel The Water is Wide, at AMAS Repertory Theater. The show is set in 1969 and recounts the adventures of Pat Conroy, a young white teacher who teaches black children on the remote South Carolina island of Yamacraw. Isaacs played Dr. Jackie Brooks, a black representative of the Department of Health, Education and Welfare who becomes romantically involved with Conroy. Stephen Holden, reviewing the show for The New York Times, said that Isaacs "brings a fine psychological precison [sic] to the role of Dr. Jackie Brooks."

In 1988 Isaacs replaced LaTonya Sue Welch as Effie in Michael Bennett's production of Dreamgirls at An Evening Dinner Theater in Elmsford, New York. Alvin Klein of the New York Times said that "Isaacs is so fine as that replacement that one feels a strange sense of confused priorities."

In 1989 Isaacs played the title role of Kay Jones, a music-hall performer who wears several disguises, in the Goodspeed Opera House revival of the Gershwins' Oh, Kay!. The setting in the revival was moved from Long Island to Harlem and the production was given an all-black cast. Stephen Holden said in his review in The New York Times that "Pamela Isaacs has only to raise an eyebrow to strike sparks. Her brassy comic charisma recalls Patti LuPone as Reno Sweeney in the Lincoln Center Theater production of Anything Goes."

In 1993 Isaacs performed a one-woman show at Center Stage in Baltimore, appearing as Billie Holiday in Lady Day at Emerson's Bar and Grill. J. Wynn Rousuck called Isaacs a "spellbinding performer" in the production and added "It's not that she attempts to impersonate [Billie Holiday]. That would probably be futile. Instead, Isaacs acts like Billie Holiday and sings like, well, Isaacs, who is a thrill to hear." Lady Day at Emerson's Bar and Grill was such a hit that Isaacs's run was extended.

In 1995 Isaacs returned to Baltimore's Center Stage to play the leading role in a production of Kurt Weill's Happy End as Salvation Army worker Lilian Holiday. While in Baltimore for the Center Stage productions, Isaacs appeared in one episode of Homicide: Life on the Street.

Isaacs has also appeared in Productions of "Bubbling Brown Sugar" as Etta, in "Porgy and Bess" as Bess and "The real life story of Johnny De Facto" and also starred in the Los Angeles Productions of "Dark of the Moon, "Sessions Reasons," "The Ballad of Eveline" and showgirls as a solo vocalist. Isaacs also toured Europe, the USSR, and Africa with the rhythm and blues group Starfire.

=== Tony nomination in The Life ===
In 1997 Isaacs played Queen, a principled sex worker who wants a real home and a marriage, in the musical The Life. The New York Times said that "Isaacs's voice has the suppleness of Lena Horne's and a purity that is never sabotaged by its range. It's an instrument to cause goose bumps of pleasure. She rivets attention from her first appearance until the ambitious finale. As sung by Ms. Isaacs, Queen has backbone that only a good score can express with such immediacy." Isaacs was nominated for the 1997 Tony and Drama Desk Award as Best Actress in a Musical for The Life. Ben Brantley also praised Isaac's performance when the play opened in 1997. "Most of the ballads go to Ms. Isaacs, who has a husky, vibrato-shaded voice, somewhere between Tina Turner and Helen Morgan, which resonates affectingly with pain and longing," said Brantley. "She delivers absolutely everything (including some clunky sung recitative) with commanding sincerity and polish." The Life played for 466 performances on Broadway at the Ethel Barrymore Theatre.

In 1999 Isaacs played a plastic-molding machine worker in the revival of Working, based on Studs Terkel's identically titled book.

In 2001 Isaacs portrayed a Starbucks counter girl who kept yuppies waiting in Newyorkers. Isaacs sings "No Hurry at All," "a bluesy solo powerfully sung and amusingly acted" said Bruce Weber in The New York Times. In 2001, Isaacs won an Obie Award for her performance as the Starbucks barista in the off-Broadway play.

=== Thoroughly Modern Millie ===
In 2003 Isaacs won raves for her performance of Muzzie Van Hossmere, a madcap Manhattan cabaret singer and heiress with a zest for the high life and a glamorous penthouse, in the national tour of the Broadway musical Thoroughly Modern Millie. Donna Bailey-Thompson said of Isaac's performance at the Bushnell Center for the Performing Arts in Hartford, Connecticut that "Pamela Isaacs almost stops the show when she wraps her powerful, throaty voice around an okay sound and transforms it into a throbbing paean to New York." D. Aviva Rothschild wrote of her performance: "Pamela Isaacs as Muzzy proved right from the get-go why she'd been a Tony nominee for The Life. Damn, her voice was thrilling!" Les Spindle wrote that "As bon-vivant millionaire Muzzy van Hossmere – a role created for Carol Channing – the vivacious Pamela Isaacs pulls off a tour-de-force triumph, bolstered by her lively new songs."

Isaacs has performed in Regional Theatre at Long Wharf Theatre, Baltimore Center Stage, Yale Repertory Theatre, and Goodspeed Opera House.

== Television ==
Isaacs appeared as Dr. Josie Conklin on the daytime soap One Life to Live and has made guest appearances on series including Homicide: Life on the Street and Third Watch.

== Movies ==
Isaacs appeared as Mrs. Egan in the 2002 film Swimfan.

== Discography ==
- Lady Day at Emersons Bar & Grill (1998)

== Awards ==
Isaacs was nominated for the 1997 Tony and Drama Desk Award as Best Actress in a Musical for The Life.

In 2001, Isaacs won an Obie Award for her performance as the Starbucks barista in the off-Broadway play Newyorkers.
