= Nancy Andrews (actress) =

American actress and singer

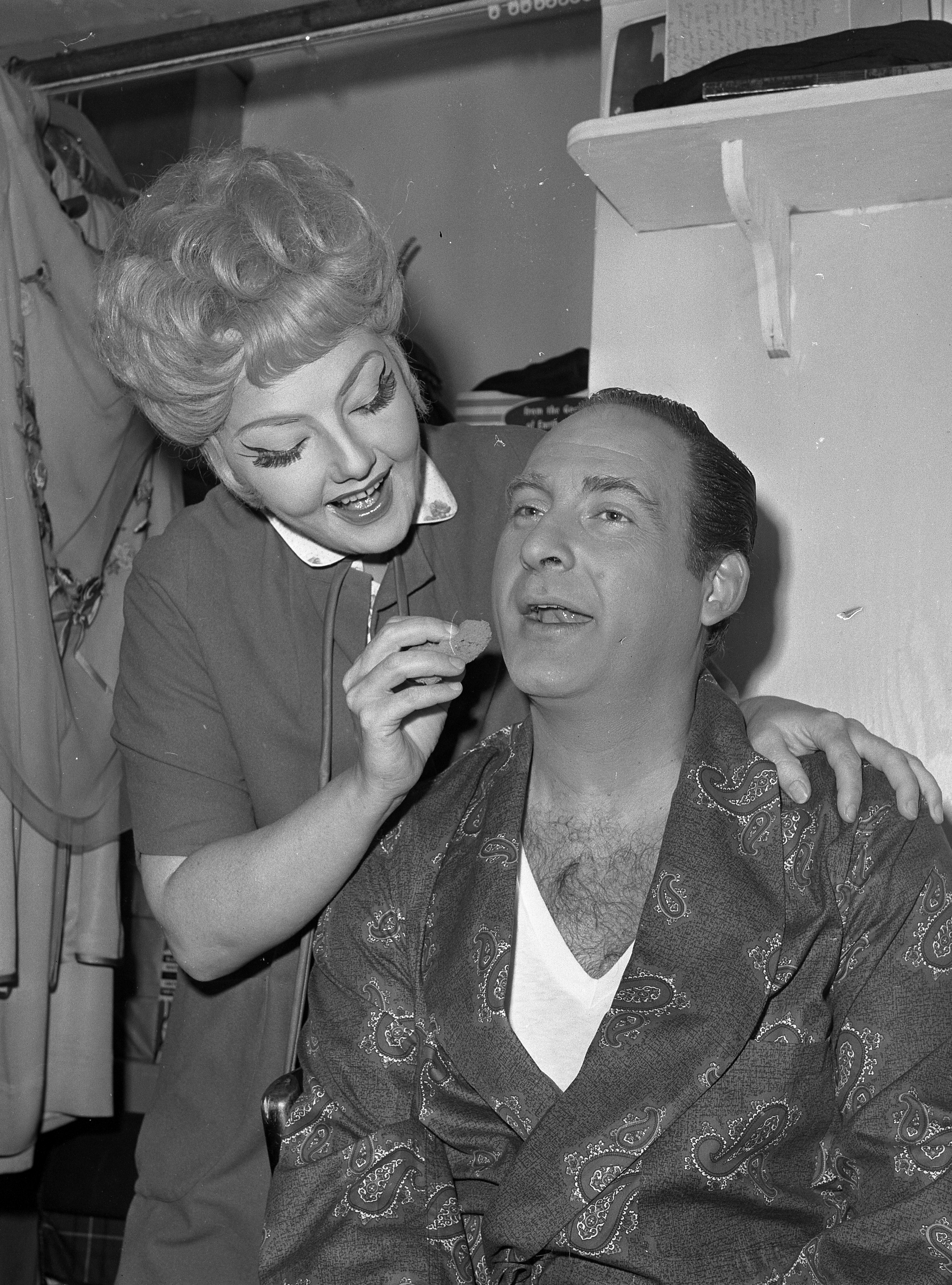
- Andrews with Sid Caesar for a performance of Little Me
- Born: December 16, 1920; Minneapolis, Minnesota, U.S.
- Died: July 29, 1989 (aged 68); New York City, U.S.
- Occupations: Actress; opera singer; pianist
- Years active: 1943–1984
- Spouse: Parke N. Bossart

Nancy Andrews (December 16, 1920 – July 29, 1989) was an American stage and film actress and singer.

== Early life ==
Andrews was born in Minneapolis, Minnesota, on December 16, 1920. Her parents were James Currier Andrews and Grace Ella Andrews (née Gerrish). She attended Beverly Hills High School and the Los Angeles City College. She also studied at the Pasadena Playhouse and the American Shakespeare Academy.

== Stage work ==
Andrews started her career as a cabaret singer and pianist. Her first stage appearance was in 1938 in a production of The Merry Wives of Windsor at the Beverly Hills Shakespeare Theatre. From 1943 through 1945, she performed with the United Service Organizations. Andrews made her Broadway theatre debut in 1949 in the revue Touch and Go at the Broadhurst Theatre, a performance for which she won a Theatre World Award. In 1954, Andrews toured Europe in the one-woman show Songs and Laughter. In January 1955 she appeared in the original production of Plain and Fancy and later that year in Pipe Dream. In 1962 Andrews co-starred with Sid Caesar and Virginia Martin in the Broadway musical Little Me, playing Old Belle. Andrews appeared at the 1969 Dublin Theatre Festival in a production of In the Summer House.

== Film work ==
Andrews appeared in several films including The Werewolf of Washington and Summer Wishes, Winter Dreams in 1973, W.W. and the Dixie Dancekings in 1975, and Night of the Juggler in 1980. She also appeared on various talk shows such as The Ed Sullivan Show (then referred to as Toast of the Town), The Perry Como Show, The Joe Franklin Show and The Merv Griffin Show. Andrews was a member of the National Academy of Television Arts and Sciences.

== Death ==
On July 29, 1989, Andrews died of a heart attack at the age of 68 at the St. John's Hospital in Queens.
