= Sheldon Epps =

American television and theatre director

- Born: November 15, 1952 (age 73); Los Angeles, California, U.S.
- Occupations: Television director, theatre director
- Years active: 1981–present

Sheldon Epps (born November 15, 1952) is an American television and theatre director.

== Career ==
Sheldon Epps was born in Los Angeles, California. He moved to Teaneck, New Jersey, when he was 11 years old, where he attended the local public schools, and was first drawn to the stage while at Teaneck High School. Epps graduated from Carnegie Mellon University in 1973.

He began his career as an actor studying at the Brooklyn Academy of Music, Indiana Repertory Company, the Alley Theatre, Civic Light Opera of Pittsburgh and The Production Company which he co-founded and for which he directed a number of plays.

In 1980, Epps made his theater directorial debut with the Off-Broadway musical Blues in the Night. It was revived in 1982, this time on Broadway. Since then he has directed a number of other stage productions on Broadway and in regional theaters namely Scenes and Revelations, Play On!, Blue and Purlie.

In 1994, Epps moved to television, directing an episode of Evening Shade. His other television credits include Smart Guy, Sister, Sister, Frasier, Everybody Loves Raymond, Friends, Girlfriends and George Lopez.

In 1997, Epps became artistic director of the Pasadena Playhouse. Despite the financial trouble the Playhouse has endured since the 1980s, Epps has continued his role in bringing back the popularity of theater to the venue.

In 2020, Epps was appointed Senior Artistic Advisor at Ford's Theatre in Washington, D.C.

His best selling memoir My Own Directions was published in September 2022 by McFarland Books.

== Directing work ==
Television

- Evening Shade (1 episode, 1994)
- Smart Guy (3 episodes, 1997–1998)
- Sister, Sister (3 episodes, 1997–1998)
- Encore! Encore! (1997)
- Frasier (22 episodes, 1998–2004)
- Stark Raving Mad (2 episodes, 2000)
- Veronica's Closet (1 episode, 2000)
- Girlfriends (59 episodes, 2000–2005, also producer)
- Friends (3 episodes, 2001–2003)
- My Wife and Kids (1 episode, 2002)
- Everybody Loves Raymond (1 episode, 2002)
- In-Laws (4 episodes, 2002)
- What I Like About You (2 episodes, 2003)
- The Tracy Morgan Show (1 episode, 2003)
- The Soluna Project (TV film, 2004)
- Joey (3 episodes, 2004–2005)
- Life on a Stick (1 episode, 2005)
- Bow (TV film, 2005)
- Talk Show Diaries (TV film, 2005)
- Out of Practice (5 episodes, 2005)
- Love, Inc. (3 episodes 2005–2006)
- George Lopez (6 episodes, 2006–2007)
- Stacked (1 episode, 2006)
- The Game (2 episodes, 2006)
- Hannah Montana (1 episode, 2007)
- Sherri (2 episodes, 2009)
- True Jackson, VP (2 episodes, 2010)
- Reed Between the Lines (6 episodes, 2011)
- How to Rock (3 episodes, 2012)
- Instant Mom (4 episodes, 2015)
- Raven's Home (2 episodes, 2019)
- The Upshaws (4 episodes, 2021)
- Frasier (2 episodes, 2024)

Theater

- Blues in the Night (1980, 1982 revival)
- Scenes and Revelations (1981)
- Play On! (1997)
- Blue (2000 and 2003)
- Showtune (2003)
- Purlie (2005)
- Unchain My Heart (2011)
