= Radiant Baby =

- Haring's Radiant Baby character from which the musical took its name
- Music: Debra Barsha
- Lyrics: Ira Gasman; Stuart Ross; Debra Barsha
- Basis: Keith Haring: The Authorized Biography by John Jonas Gruen
- Premiere: The Public Theater

Radiant Baby is a musical about Keith Haring, who was an artist and social activist in New York City. The music was composed by Debra Barsha, with lyrics by Ira Gasman, Stuart Ross, and Debra Barsha. It was based on Keith Haring: The Authorized Biography (1991) by John Gruen.

Radiant Baby was partially developed at the 1998 O'Neil Music Theater Conference in Waterford, Connecticut. It had its New York premiere at The Public Theater in a 2003 production directed by George C. Wolfe with Daniel Reichard in the title role. Kate Jennings Grant and Billy Porter also appeared in the New York production.
