= Ira Gasman =

American playwright, lyricist, and newspaper columnist

Ira Gasman (c. 1942 – October 6, 2018) was an American playwright, lyricist, and newspaper columnist. He was nominated for both Tony and Drama Desk Awards for his contributions to The Life, the 1997 Broadway musical that had its first production at off-Broadway's Westbeth Theatre seven years earlier.

Gasman grew up in Brooklyn, then attended James Madison High School and New York University. He became an advertising copywriter, best known for coining "The Quicker Picker-Upper" as a slogan for Bounty paper towels. His first major theatrical venture was a topical revue called What's a Nice Country Like You Doing in a State Like This? (1973), which played 543 performances. The composer was Cary Hoffman, and the cast included future stars Priscilla Lopez and Betty Buckley. After The Life, he collaborated on the lyrics for Radiant Baby, based on the life of artist Keith Haring, which was presented by the Public Theater in 2003 and received a Lucille Lortel Award nomination for Outstanding Musical.

Gasman regularly wrote a column for The Sag Harbor Express, which serves the South Fork of Long Island.

Gasman died at the age of 76 on October 6, 2018, in Richmond, Virginia.

== Theatre credits ==
| Year | Title | Role | Music | Lyrics | Book | Ref. |
|---|---|---|---|---|---|---|
| 1985 | What's a Nice Country Like You Doing in a State Like This? | Lyrics | Cary Hoffman | Ira Gasman | N/A | |
| 1990 | The Life | Lyrics | Cy Coleman | Ira Gasman | David Newman, Ira Gasman & Cy Coleman | |
| 1998 | Radiant Baby | Lyrics | Debra Barsha | Ira Gasman, Stuart Ross & Debra Barsha | Stuart Ross | |
