= Cy Coleman =

American composer, songwriter, and jazz pianist (1929–2004)

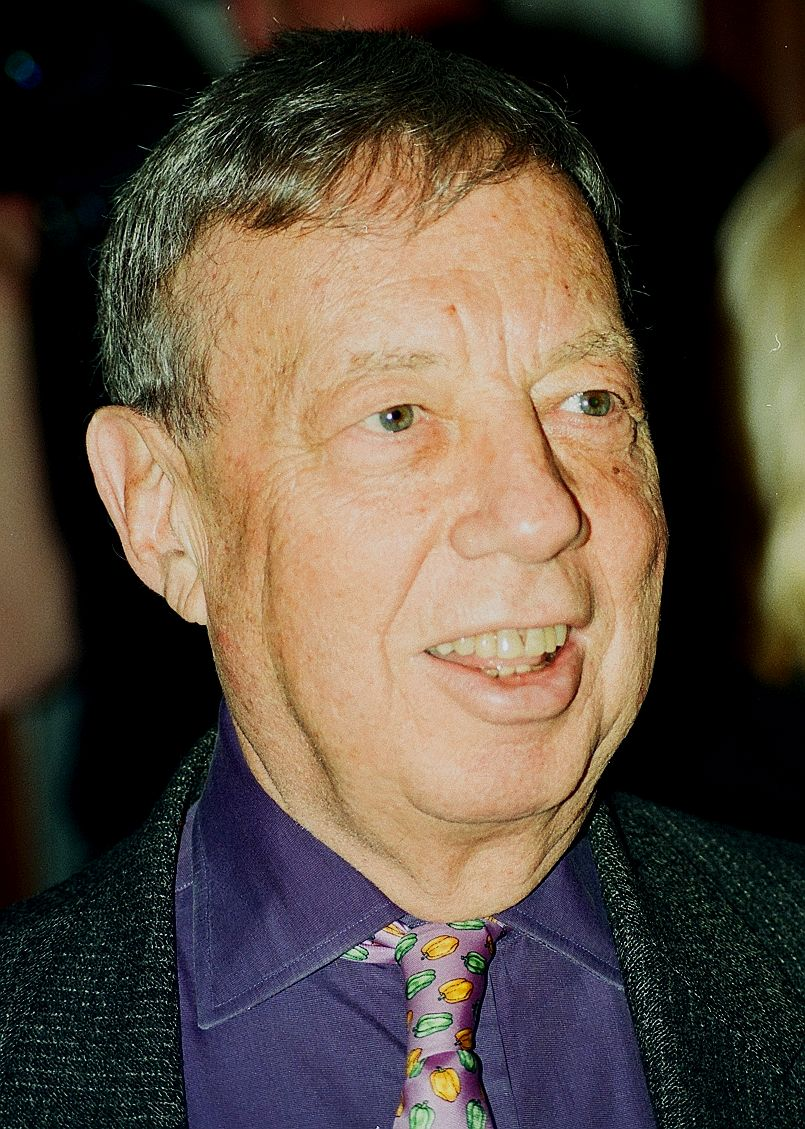
- Coleman in 1996

Background information
- Born: Seymour Kaufman; June 14, 1929; New York City, U.S.
- Died: November 18, 2004 (aged 75) New York City, U.S.
- Genres: Jazz; pop
- Occupations: Composer, songwriter, pianist

Cy Coleman (born Seymour Kaufman; June 14, 1929 – November 18, 2004) was an American composer, songwriter, and jazz pianist.

== Life and career ==
Coleman was born Seymour Kaufman in New York City, to Eastern European Jewish parents, and was raised in the Bronx. His mother, Ida (née Prizent) was an apartment landlady and his father was a brickmason. He was a child prodigy who gave piano recitals at venues such as Steinway Hall, Town Hall, and Carnegie Hall between the ages of six and nine. Before beginning his fabled Broadway career, he led the Cy Coleman Trio, which made many recordings and was a much-in-demand club attraction.

Despite the early classical and jazz success, Coleman decided to build a career in popular music. His first collaborator was Joseph Allen McCarthy, but his most successful early partnership, albeit a turbulent one, was with Carolyn Leigh. The pair wrote many pop hits, including "Witchcraft" and "The Best Is Yet to Come". One of his instrumentals, "Playboy's Theme," became the signature music of the regular syndicated late night TV show Playboy After Dark in the 1960s. This included specials presented by the editor/publisher Hugh M. Hefner of Playboy magazine, and remains synonymous with the Chicago magazine and its creator, Hefner.

Coleman's career as a Broadway composer began when he and Leigh collaborated on Wildcat (1960), which marked the Broadway debut of movie/television comedienne Lucille Ball. The score included the hit tune "Hey, Look Me Over". When Ball became ill, she left the show, and it closed. Next for the two was Little Me, with a book by Neil Simon based on the novel of the same name by Patrick Dennis. The show introduced "Real Live Girl" and "I've Got Your Number," which became popular standards.

In 1964, Coleman met Dorothy Fields at a party, and when he asked if she would like to collaborate with him, she is reported to have answered: "Thank God somebody asked." Fields was revitalized by working with the much younger Coleman, and by the contemporary nature of their first project, which was Sweet Charity, again with a book by Simon, starring Gwen Verdon, and introducing the songs "If My Friends Could See Me Now", "I'm a Brass Band", "Big Spender" and "The Rhythm of Life". The show was a major success and Coleman found working with Fields much easier than with Leigh. The partnership was to work on two more shows – an aborted project about Eleanor Roosevelt, and Seesaw which reached Broadway in 1973 after a troubled out-of-town tour. Despite mixed reviews, the show enjoyed a healthy run. The partnership was cut short by Fields' death in 1974.

Coleman remained prolific in the late 1970s. He collaborated on I Love My Wife (1977) with Michael Stewart, On the Twentieth Century (1978) with Betty Comden and Adolph Green, and Home Again, Home Again with Barbara Fried, although the latter never reached Broadway. Also in 1970, he produced the single "Lying Here" (Mercury 73150) for the Rock opera Sensations, and took a full-page (back cover) advert in Billboard magazine to promote his upcoming star vocalist Steve Leeds.

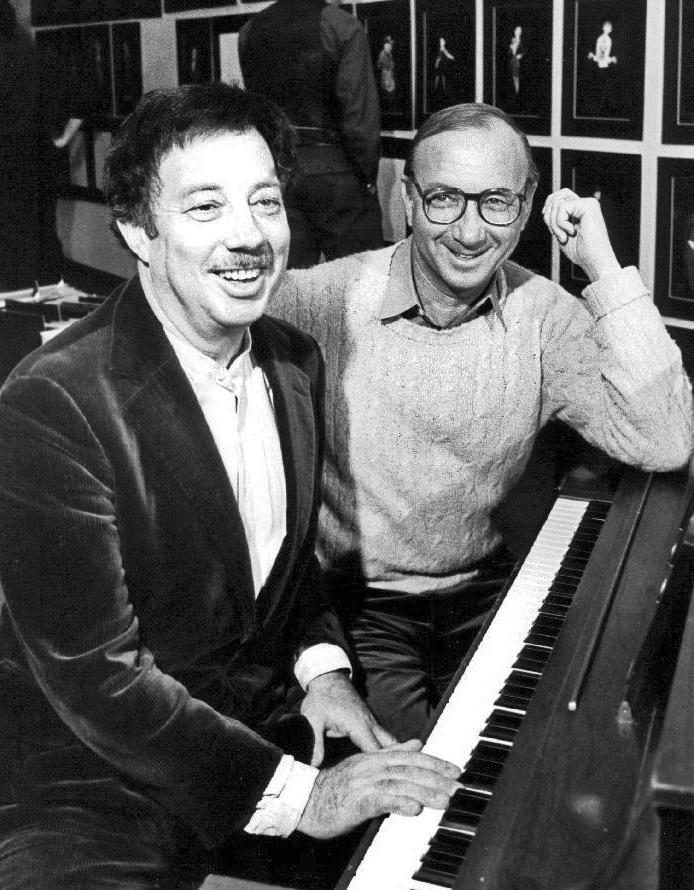
Cy Coleman with playwright Neil Simon (right) during a rehearsal in 1982

In 1980, Coleman served as producer and composer for the circus-themed Barnum, which co-starred Jim Dale and Glenn Close. Later in the decade, he collaborated on Welcome to the Club (1988) with A. E. Hotchner, and City of Angels (1989) with David Zippel. In the latter, inspired by the hard-boiled detective film noir of the 1930s and 1940s, he returned to his jazz roots, and the show was a huge critical and commercial success. The 1990s brought more new Coleman musicals to Broadway: The Will Rogers Follies (1991), again with Comden and Green, The Life (1997), a gritty look at pimps, prostitutes, and assorted other lowlife in the big city, with Ira Gasman, and a revised production of Little Me.

Coleman's film scores include Father Goose, The Art of Love, Garbo Talks, Power, and Family Business. In addition, he wrote memorable television specials for Shirley MacLaine, If My Friends Could See Me Now and Gypsy in My Soul. Coleman has been the only composer to win consecutive Tony awards for Best Score at the same time that the corresponding musicals won for Best Musical: City of Angels and The Will Rogers Follies (although Stephen Sondheim actually won three consecutive Tony Awards for Best Score for Company, Follies, and A Little Night Music, Follies did not win for Best Musical). Coleman was on the ASCAP Board of Directors for many years and also served as their Vice Chairman Writer.

One final musical with a Coleman score played in Los Angeles at the Mark Taper Forum between December 2003 and January 2004, under the title Like Jazz, as a Broadway tryout. Investor Transamerica Capital went forward with plans to mount a Broadway production renamed In the Pocket. Dirk Decloedt and Maurice Hines were announced as director and choreographer with an anticipated opening in Spring 2006 but it never opened.

== Education ==
Coleman studied at New York's The High School of Music & Art and the New York College of Music, graduating in 1948.

== Death ==
On November 18, 2004, Coleman attended the Broadway opening of Michael Frayn's play Democracy, and went to the premiere party afterward. However, he soon fell ill, and was taken to New York Hospital, where he died later that evening at the age of 75; his death was attributed to a heart condition, variously said to be a heart attack or heart failure. He was survived by his wife, Shelby Coleman (née Brown) and their adopted daughter.

== Theatre credits ==
Year	Title	Role	Music	Lyrics	Book	Ref.
1960	Wildcat	Music	Cy Coleman	Carolyn Leigh	N. Richard Nash	
1962	Little Me	Music	Cy Coleman	Carolyn Leigh	Neil Simon	
1966	Sweet Charity	Music	Cy Coleman	Dorothy Fields	Neil Simon	
1973	Seesaw	Music	Cy Coleman	Dorothy Fields	Michael Bennett	
1977	I Love My Wife	Music	Cy Coleman	Michael Stewart		
1978	On the Twentieth Century	Music	Cy Coleman	Betty Comden & Adolph Green		
1979	Home Again, Home Again	Music	Cy Coleman	Barbara Fried	Russell Baker	
1980	Barnum	Music & producer	Cy Coleman	Michael Stewart	Mark Bramble	
1989	Welcome to the Club	Music & lyrics	Cy Coleman	Cy Coleman & A. E. Hotchner	A. E. Hotchner	
1989	City of Angels	Music	Cy Coleman	David Zippel	Larry Gelbart	
1990	The Life	Music	Cy Coleman	Ira Gasman	David Newman, Ira Gasman & Cy Coleman	
1991	The Will Rogers Follies	Music	Cy Coleman	Betty Comden & Adolph Green	Peter Stone	
2003	Like Jazz/In the Pocket	Music	Cy Coleman	Alan and Marilyn Bergman	Larry Gelbart	

== Awards, nominations and honors ==
=== Awards and nominations ===
- 1997 Tony Award Best Book of a Musical The Life (nominee)
- 1997 Tony Award Best Musical The Life (nominee)
- 1997 Tony Award Best Original Score The Life (nominee)
- 1991 Tony Award Best Musical The Will Rogers Follies (winner)
- 1991 Tony Award Best Original Score The Will Rogers Follies (winner)
- 1990 Tony Award Best Musical City of Angels (winner)
- 1990 Tony Award Best Original Score City of Angels (winner)
- 1980 Tony Award Best Musical Barnum (nominee)
- 1980 Tony Award Best Original Score Barnum (nominee)
- 1978 Tony Award Best Musical On the Twentieth Century (nominee)
- 1978 Tony Award Best Original Score On the Twentieth Century (winner)
- 1977 Tony Award Best Musical I Love My Wife (nominee)
- 1977 Tony Award Best Original Score I Love My Wife (nominee)
- 1974 Tony Award Best Musical Seesaw (nominee)
- 1974 Tony Award Best Original Score Seesaw (nominee)
- 1966 Tony Award Best Composer and Lyricist Sweet Charity (nominee)
- 1966 Tony Award Best Musical Sweet Charity (nominee)
- 1963 Tony Award Best Composer and Lyricist Little Me (nominee)
- 1963 Tony Award Best Musical Little Me (nominee)

He also won three Emmy Awards and two Grammy Awards, and an Academy Award nomination.

=== Honors ===
Among his many honors and awards, Coleman was elected to the Songwriter's Hall of Fame (1981), and was the recipient of the Songwriter's Hall of Fame Johnny Mercer Award (1995) and the ASCAP Foundation Richard Rodgers Award for lifetime achievement in American musical theatre. He was elected to the American Theatre Hall of Fame and received an Honorary Doctorate from Hofstra University in 2000.
