= The Adventures of Captain Underpants =

1997 novel by Dav Pilkey

- First edition cover
- Author: Dav Pilkey
- Illustrator: Dav Pilkey
- Language: English
- Series: Captain Underpants
- Genre: Superhero; Toilet humor; Slapstick; Science fiction
- Publisher: Scholastic
- Publication date: September 1, 1997 (black-and-white); September 1, 2005 (collector's edition); August 27, 2013 (color edition); March 7, 2023 (25½ anniversary edition)
- Publication place: United States
- Media type: Print (paperback, hardcover)
- Pages: 125
- ISBN: 978-0-590-84628-8 0-590-84628-0
- Followed by: Captain Underpants and the Attack of the Talking Toilets

The Adventures of Captain Underpants is a 1997 children's novel written and illustrated by American author Dav Pilkey. It follows George Beard and Harold Hutchins, two fourth-graders who hypnotize their principal, Mr. Krupp, into becoming the titular "greatest superhero of all time". The success of The Adventures of Captain Underpants spawned an extended franchise, including several sequels, spin-offs, and multimedia adaptations.

== Plot ==
George Beard and Harold Hutchins are two mischievous fourth-graders who attend Jerome Horwitz Elementary School in Piqua. They are known for making comic books featuring Captain Underpants, a superhero of their own creation. When the boys ruin the school's football game with a series of practical jokes, their principal, Mr. Krupp, catches them arranging their pranks on camera and threatens to give the footage to the football team unless they submit to a list of rules he imposes. George and Harold find themselves burdened with good behavior, extra homework, and chores for Krupp.

To escape their punishment, George orders a "3-D Hypno-Ring" from the Li'l Wiseguy Novelty Company. The boys use the ring to hypnotize Krupp, and Harold replaces Krupp's videotape with one of his little sister's "Boomer the Purple Dragon" sing-along videos. George jokingly instructs Krupp to behave like a chicken and Harold instructs him to act like a monkey. When they finally instruct him to act like Captain Underpants, Krupp dresses as the Captain and leaves the school to fight crime. The boys find "Captain Underpants" confronting a pair of bank robbers and carry him away.

The trio witnesses two robots stealing a large crystal from a shop and follows them to an abandoned warehouse. There, Captain Underpants is tied up by the evil Dr. Diaper, who plans to destroy the Moon with his crystal-powered Laser-Matic 2000. George uses a slingshot to hurl fake dog feces between Dr. Diaper's legs. Believing the feces to be his own, Dr. Diaper goes to change himself, leaving George and Harold to destroy the robots and free Captain Underpants. Harold pulls the machine's self-destruct lever just as Dr. Diaper returns. After Captain Underpants subdues Dr. Diaper, he and the boys escape, leaving Dr. Diaper for the police to arrest.

Back at school, Captain Underpants redresses as Krupp so the boys can reverse the hypnosis, but they have misplaced the ring's manual. George impulsively pours a vase of water on Captain Underpants's head, reverting him to Krupp. After Krupp leaves with Harold's videotape, George finds the manual and discards it, not noticing a warning that immersing a hypnotized person in water will cause them to relapse into their trance at the sound of fingers snapping. George and Harold return to their usual mischief, but realize they must keep Mr. Krupp from hearing finger snaps, which turns him back into Captain Underpants.

== Development ==
Dav Pilkey first created the character of Captain Underpants in 1974, when he was in second grade, for a series of comics he drew at school. In 1988, while visiting schools and telling students about the character, he began receiving suggestions that he should make a full Captain Underpants book. The following year, Pilkey self-published a book titled The Really Cool Adventures of Captain Underpants. It had a limited print run of around 25 to 50 copies and was sold at a few local stores in Kent, Ohio. Little is known about the book. Pilkey decided to revisit the character several years later and pitched the idea to his editor, Bonnie Verburg, who was also the publisher and founder of Scholastic's imprint, The Blue Sky Press. On why he focused on underwear in the book, Pilkey stated "I think underwear is funny because you’re not supposed to laugh at it."

Early printings of the book feature the tagline "An Epic Novel by Dav Pilkey" instead of "The First Epic Novel by Dav Pilkey." Some early paperback editions also feature the "Little Apple" logo on the cover, which was removed in later copies.

== Expanded franchise ==
=== Sequels ===
The Adventures of Captain Underpants became the first instalment in a series of novels, being followed by eleven sequels: Captain Underpants and the Attack of the Talking Toilets, Captain Underpants and the Invasion of the Incredibly Naughty Cafeteria Ladies from Outer Space (both 1999), Captain Underpants and the Perilous Plot of Professor Poopypants (2000), Captain Underpants and the Wrath of the Wicked Wedgie Woman (2001), Captain Underpants and the Big, Bad Battle of the Bionic Booger Boy Part 1 and 2 (2003), Captain Underpants and the Preposterous Plight of the Purple Potty People (2006), Captain Underpants and the Terrifying Return of Tippy Tinkletrousers (2012), Captain Underpants and the Revolting Revenge of the Radioactive Robo-Boxers (2013), Captain Underpants and the Tyrannical Retaliation of the Turbo Toilet 2000 (2014) and Captain Underpants and the Sensational Saga of Sir Stinks-A-Lot (2015).

=== Spin-offs ===
Captain Underpants was also followed by three spin-off graphic novels: The Adventures of Super Diaper Baby (2002), The Adventures of Ook and Gluk: Kung-Fu Cavemen from the Future (2010), and Super Diaper Baby 2: The Invasion of the Potty Snatchers (2011). Both Super Diaper Baby novels received generally positive reviews. The Adventures of Ook and Gluk also received positive reviews, although in 2021, it would be removed from the markets in response to a petition claiming it perpetuated racist stereotypes about Asians. After the main series concluded with the twelfth novel, Captain Underpants and the Sensational Saga of Sir Stinks-A-Lot, in 2015, another spin-off, titled Dog Man, was released in 2016. Dog Man itself was followed by thirteen sequels, with the latest being 2026's A Sprinkle in Time. It received its own spin-off series, titled Cat Kid Comic Club, in 2020, with a total of five books.

=== Adaptations ===
In 2011, DreamWorks Animation acquired the film rights to the book series to produce a computer-animated film adaptation titled Captain Underpants: The First Epic Movie, which was released by 20th Century Fox on June 2, 2017. It grossed a total of $125 million worldwide against a total budget of $38 million, and received positive reviews. The film's success led to a standalone sequel television series titled The Epic Tales of Captain Underpants, which premiered on Netflix on July 13, 2018, and a spin-off film titled Dog Man, released by Universal Pictures on January 31, 2025. On July 31, 2025, it was announced by People magazine that a manga adaptation of The Adventures of Captain Underpants, titled Captain Underpants: The First Epic Manga, would be written and adapted by Dav Pilkey with new illustrations by manga artist Motojiro. It was released on April 7, 2026.

== See also ==
- Dav Pilkey
- Captain Underpants
