= List of The Epic Tales of Captain Underpants episodes =

The Epic Tales of Captain Underpants is an American 2D-animated streaming television series produced by DreamWorks Animation Television that is based on (and a sequel to) the 2017 3D-animated film Captain Underpants: The First Epic Movie, which in turn is based on the Captain Underpants series of books by Dav Pilkey.

== Series overview ==
Season	Episodes	Originally released	
Season	Episodes	First released	Last released
1	13	July 13, 2018	
2	13	February 8, 2019	
Camp	13	July 19, 2019	
Specials	3	October 8, 2019	December 4, 2020
In Space!	6	July 10, 2020	

== Episodes ==
=== Season 1 (2018) ===
No. overall	No. in season	Title	Directed by	Written by	Antagonist(s)	Original release date
1	1	"The Frenzied Farts of Flabby Flabulous"	Todd Grimes	Peter Hastings	Flabby Flabulous	July 13, 2018
Just as George and Harold try to get out of gym class and avoid P.E for 22 years after all their friends have an excuse (including Melvin), inadvertently end up getting sent to the principal's office after spilling Mr. Meaner's root beer and they later escape from Meaner and Mr. Krupp clash on how angry they are, Meaner clumsily lands on Melvin's latest invention, the Pumpitupinator 2000, which was at a 'big mistake plot point' mode and therefore turns Meaner into an overly huge butt supervillain.
2	2	"The Dreadful Debacle of DJ Drowsy Drawers"	Seung W. Cha & Octavio E. Rodriguez	Mark Banker	DJ Drowsy Drawers	July 13, 2018
Mr. Krupp wants to keep school dances incredibly boring, so George and Harold try to liven things up by becoming DJ Jazzy George and DJ Heavy Harold. Meanwhile, the official DJ, Ms. Hurd, turns into DJ Drowsy Drawers after getting smashed by an ice cream truck and the upcoming lunch at Jerome Horwitz. DJ Drowsy Drawers makes everyone sleep, including Captain Underpants. Now George and Harold have to do an ultimate DJ battle.
3	3	"The Horrible Hostilities of the Homework Hydra"	Seung W. Cha	Matt Smith	Homework Hydra	July 13, 2018
George and Harold go back in time to Ancient Egypt in order to stop homework, but afterwards, they find out that comics can count as homework too. In doing so, a copy of the comic for this episode ends up with Ms. Ribble, causing her to reinvent homework. The teachers of the school are filled with excitement when they break the floor while jumping with excitement. Now the teachers (and Ms. Anthrope) have fused together with a printer into one giant beast.
4	4	"The Vexing Villainy of the Vile Vimpire"	Kevin Peaty	Daniel Dominguez	Jessica Gordon/The Vimpire	July 13, 2018
George and Harold write a comic about a dynamite villain. Unfortunately, the girls are unhappy because the girl characters only shop, cry, and brush pony hair, so George and Harold make a strong female character called Scarica Fang which was not really like Erica said. Erica pretends to be the Vimpire. It is revealed that Melvin has a crush on Erica, so, tries to blast Erica with boring videos (like rotting fruit) so that she would like him, but runs a test drive on Jessica, who was eating bats at the same time she got zapped, and it was not a good combination. So she turns into the Vimpire.
5	5	"The Terrifying Perilous Misfortune of the TP Mummy"	Octavio E. Rodriguez	Matt Smith	TP Mummy	July 13, 2018
George and Harold are planning a toilet paper ( TP for short ) prank on the whole school by covering the whole school with toilet paper and claiming they will be legends. Meanwhile, so many TP had come to the school for Mr. Krupp to impress a new boring French teacher named Ms. Yewh comes to the school for French Week. George and Harold steal the TP for their prank, but it backfires and they have to clean up the whole school. They are finished and they sell a new comic about Ms. Yewh, but Mr. Krupp confiscates all the comics to impress Ms. Yewh and throws them in the toilet. George and Harold notice it's flooding, so they put a whole jug of unclogging liquid, even though it gave a warning not to put too much. Meanwhile, Ms. Yewh finds a comic and reads it. It is completely rude to her, so she flushes the comic down the toilet. But a combination of too many comics and a full jar of unclogging liquid in the toilet turns her into the TP Mummy.
6	6	"The Squishy Predicament of Stanley Peet's Stinky Pits"	Seung W. Cha	Daniel Dominguez	Avocadwoe	July 13, 2018
Avocad-Grow, the annual avocado growing contest (and largely considered one of the most boring contests ever) is happening in school, and George and Harold are determined to win it (due to the prize of an 'all-you-can-eat lunch of whatever you want'). Unfortunately, thanks to Melvin's Pitacle Accelerator 2000 (which he invented to win the contest and get into Eliteanati Academy, his dream school), they accidentally turn Mr. Fyde, their science teacher, into an avocado monster.
7	7	"The Costly Conundrum of the Calamitous Claylossus"	Kevin Peaty	Mark Banker	Claylossus	July 13, 2018
George and Harold decide to investigate the shadowy Bo Hweemuth to debunk the rumors about him. They find Bo to be nice. Meanwhile, with Melvin, he has to keep the students scared because he is under the orders of Krupp. He has to do it so that Krupp can write him a letter of recommendation to Eliteanati Academy, his dream school, and when he finds out Bo is not scary to the kids, he decided to use his Interclaytion Station 2000 to turn him into Claylossus, from George and Harold's latest comic, but the clay monster goes on a rampage in Piqua. Note: this episode briefly uses a claymation style, and also frequently jokes about the budget because of this
8	8	"The Jarring Jerkiness of the Judge Jorts"	Seung W. Cha	Daniel Dominguez	Alien robe	July 13, 2018
The clumsy new Spanish teacher, Jerry Citizen, turns into Judge J.O.R.T.S. after reading George and Harold's latest comic and finding an alien robe that gives him superpowers.
9	9	"The Strange Strife of the Smelly Socktopus"	Octavio E. Rodriguez	Sindy Boveda Spackman	Socktopus	July 13, 2018
George and Harold try to get suspended after Erica tells them about how it feels to be suspended, so George and Harold try to pull a smelly sock prank on their mean old principal Mr. Krupp and start messing around with wigs, thus resulting in creating Socktopus.
10	10	"The Flustering Mindless Woe of the Flushable Memory Wipes"	Kevin Peaty	Matt Smith	Ted Murdsly	July 13, 2018
George and Harold accidentally get pudding on their pants, causing their friends to give them the nickname "Ted Turdsly". This means trouble for the duo because Jerome Horwitz Elementary is famous for the tradition of Ted Turdsly, a cruel nickname given to students ending up with pudding on their pants. The reason it means trouble is because Mr. Krupp is a fan of the tradition and teases the latest Ted Turdsly and takes a photo in the gym when a rumor about that spreads around. While avoiding getting embarrassed, George and Harold discover the lavatory salesman Theodore Murdsly is none other than the real Ted Turdsly. For revenge on Murdsly's mockery, he takes over the school after removing the students' memories with flushable wipes for part of his vengeance, so the duo must reverse his actions.
11	11	"The Soggy Salvation of the Swirling Sweatnami"	Seung W. Cha	Daniel Dominguez	Melvin Sneedly	July 13, 2018
George and Harold try to stop Mr. Krupp from becoming a bully by asking Bernice Krupp about why he became mean and she says he got humiliated at a talent show. They perfect Young Krupp's act in the talent show, and Young Krupp says he is going to be "the best businessman ever" but he became an evil businessman, and Jerome Horwitz Elementary becomes Krupp Corp, a toy sweatshop where kids are enslaved. Now George and Harold have to turn Mr. Krupp into Captain Underpants to set things right.
12	12	"The Sickening Fumes of Smartsy Fartsy"	Octavio E. Rodriguez	Sindy Boveda Spackman	Smartsy Fartsy	July 13, 2018
George and Harold give a fart intelligence (using Melvin's inventions for a Tomorrow Talk) to get the rule book from Mr. Krupp and give it to the school superintendent Dr. Vil Endenemys and get Krupp fired forever. But, after reading a comic of a talking fart, the fart turns into an evil sinister villain.
13	13	"The Troublesome Treachery of the Thieving Toot Fairy"	Kevin Peaty	Daniel Dominguez	Smartsy Fartsy, Melvinborg	July 13, 2018
Smartsy Fartsy has returned and became the Toot Fairy to find some fart gas and build an army of farts. Meanwhile, Melvin and Vil Endenemys strike a deal that if Melvin helps George and Harold to get Mr. Krupp fired for good, Vil will send Melvin to Eliteanati Academy, his dream school. Then Melvin, George, and Harold break into Hank's Hidee-Holes, where Krupp hid the rule book.

=== Season 2 (2019) ===
No. overall	No. in season	Title	Directed by	Written by	Antagonist(s)	Original release date
14	1	"The Tenuous Takedown of the Tyrannical Teachertrons"	Todd Grimes	Matt Smith	Melvin Sneedly, Melvinborg, Teachertrons 2000	February 8, 2019
After Mr. Krupp gets fired and George and Harold get expelled, Melvin and Melvinborg take over Jerome Horwitz Elementary School and rechristen the school's name to Melvin Sneedly Elementary School, then George and Harold return after their expulsion is repealed thanks to the new superintendent Grace Wain. But their day is not good when Melvin observes that the teachers are really dimwitted and complains to Melvin-Borg. This forces the two Melvins to build the Teachertrons. Meanwhile, since Krupp was fired, George and Harold decide to turn Mr. Meaner into a hero named Sergeant Boxers.
15	2	"The Frantic Fury of the Fearsome Furculees"	Kevin Peaty	Mark Banker	Furculees	February 8, 2019
George and Harold recruit their friends into the M.I.S.F.A.R.T.S. (Mega Incredible Search Force Adventure Rescue Team Squad) to go on an incredible journey to find Mr. Krupp and get his job back.
16	3	"The Harmful Horrors of the Harrowing Hiveschool"	Octavio E. Rodriguez	Sindy Boveda Spackman	Queen Zombee (formerly Queen Bee, Mrs. Ribble)	February 8, 2019
Mr. Krupp is reinstated for a job at Melvin Sneedly Elementary School as vice-principal, which he has to sit in Ms. Anthrope's office, while Melvin-Borg still gets his office. Melvin-Borg uses bee DNA to turn the teachers into a hive-mind for him (and his past self) to control, but his plans are foiled when Melvin and Melvin-Borg fight over the bee-DNA dart gun, and it turns out they accidentally give Ms. Ribble too much bee DNA, and she becomes Queen Zombee.
17	4	"The Preposterous Peril of the Pestering Poopacabra"	Seung W. Cha	Daniel Dominguez	Poopacabra	February 8, 2019
George and Harold attempt to boost their grades so that their parents will let them attend summer camp at Lake Summer Camp. Melvin-Borg makes a competition named the Advancimals (which is named after a cartoon) Their assignment is to teach a rat (Ratrick) to do something that is the best in the competition, but Ratrick is sad to do anything and makes a comic about his feelings which George and Harold don't get. And then Ratrick runs into the sewers. Then George and Harold watch a show that says that Chupacabra is in Piqua and is hunting down Mr. Meaner, but things get complicated when Melvin's pet makes toxic sewer sludge and Melvin pours it down the drain, at the exact same spot Ratrick was at and it mutates the rat into Poopacabra.
18	5	"The Dastardly Deed of the Devious Diddlysaurus"	Octavio E. Rodriguez	Matt Smith	Malison Saurus and the Saurus Brothers	February 8, 2019
George and Harold have an assignment to do a specific essay on dinosaurs and make a comic about it for submission and fail. They try to compete with Melvin's idea for bringing a real dino for submission, but they accidentally leave their latest comic book behind in the Jurassic era while looking for a real dinosaur for their extra credit project and the dino reads it, turning all dinosaurs into pizza, mini-golf, and prank lovers. Back in the present, they befriend a dinosaur named Diddly who loves pranks.
19	6	"The Shadowy Syndrome of the Sinister Splotch"	Kevin Peaty	Sindy Boveda Spackman	Splotch (Alien robe)	February 8, 2019
An unknown shadow creature is committing crimes in Piqua and framing Captain Underpants, meaning George and Harold must clear his name to prove he's innocent and find the real culprit.
20	7	"The Bizarre Blitzkrieg of the Bothersome Butt-erflies"	Todd Grimes & Octavio E. Rodriguez	Mark Banker, Daniel Dominguez & Sindy Boveda Spackman	Butt-erflies	February 8, 2019
After Melvin creates crocobats to ruin recess, George and Harold make butt-erflies for revenge. However, things go awry when the flies are revealed to have aggressive attitudes and huge appetites. NOTE: in this episode, there is a running gag revolving around George and Harold making alliterative and outlandish ideas to solve problems, such as disposing of the Crocobats or removing Krupp from Melvinborg's bunker
21	8	"The Problematic Pandemonium of the Punishing Plungerina"	Seung W. Cha	Jeff D'Elia	Cloggernaut, Clogneta	February 8, 2019
George and Harold work together with Erica to create a new superheroine named Plungerina, who somehow comes to life when Ms. Anthrope and Mr. Rected turn into Clogneta and Cloggernaut, a pair of toilet-clogging villains who cause havoc at Piqua.
22	9	"The Bombastic Blathering of Brainy Blabulous"	Kevin Peaty	Matt Smith	Brainy Blabulous	February 8, 2019
Fed up with Melvin, George and Harold transfer to a new school where teachers are nice including Mr. Krupp, but things go wrong when Mr. Neamer (nice Mr. Meaner) turns into Brainy Blabulous. Trivia: Brainy Blabulous was an alternate universe version of Flabby Flabbulous, and Dressy and Gooch do not appear in this episode.
23	10	"The Crazy Caustic Spray of the Contagious Cruelius Sneezer"	Todd Grimes & Octavio E. Rodriguez	Mark Banker & Daniel Dominguez	Cruelius Sneezer	February 8, 2019
After being bored of the past field trips, George and Harold convince Melvin to turn the bus into a time machine and turn their trip to the "Romeinaday" museum into a trip to the real ancient Rome.
24	11	"The Trashy Tale of the Tumultuous Tubbadump"	Seung W. Cha	Sindy Boveda Spackman	Tubbadump	February 8, 2019
When Piqua is celebrating Horatio Dump, the inventor of the dump, the tradition in Piqua is to make a tribute to the founding. George and Harold try to get first place in the contest to get "enough extra credit to choke a horse" so they can go to camp. However, the Melvins send the trash away to another dimension to keep the school clean when an Eliteanati comes for an interview the same day.
25	12	"The Taxing Trauma of the Treacherous Tattle Trials"	Kevin Peaty	Matt Smith	Nano-Nerd (Melvin Sneedly)	February 8, 2019
26	13	"The Taxing Trauma of the Treacherous Tattle Trials"	Seung W. Cha	Mark Banker	Nanobots, Captain Nanopants (Captain Underpants), Melvinborg	February 8, 2019
Part 1: George and Harold have gotten good enough grades to go to Eliteanati Academy, even though they want to go to camp instead. After Melvin gets tricked into them going, Melvin-Borg makes a "Doom Dome", a huge dome filled with monsters and booby traps, and makes an elimination competition.; Part 2: After The Nanobots hacked the dome, George, Captain Underpants, Harold and the Melvins flee, and later cause the Nanobots to take over Captain Underpants' brain, which makes him huge, and control him to destroy Piqua. Now it's up to George, Harold, and the Melvins to shrink themselves down and enter into Captain Underpants' head to take down the Nanobots' leader once and for all. In this episode, it is revealed that Grace Wain (the new superintendent of Jerome Horwitz Elementary School) is actually Erica Wang from the future.

=== Season 3: Camp (2019) ===
No. overall	No. in season	Title	Directed by	Written by	Antagonist(s)	Original release date
27	1	"The Worrisome Wedge of the Water Warmongers"	Todd Grimes	Mark Banker & Sindy Boveda Spackman	Balloonatic, Campifire, Benjamin Krupp	July 19, 2019
George and Harold arrive at the same camp, but their summer is turned into a disaster when Mr. Krupp, the camp director, splits it into two camps (George is in 'Camp Lake Summer Camp' and Harold is in 'Lake Summer Camp Camp') in order to get two paychecks and buy a free Leisure Myland.
28	2	"The Angry Abnormal Atrocities of the Astute Animal Aggressors"	Seung W. Cha	Daniel Dominguez	Ragely J. Snarlingtooth	July 19, 2019
George and Harold make a possum smart as part of the plan to make Krupp put them in the same camp. But when Ragely the possum turns against them and turns the children at camp into servants, it's go time for Captain Underpants.
29	3	"The Abysmal Altercation of the Abominable Altitooth"	Kevin Peaty	Matt Smith	Altitooth	July 19, 2019
Krupp doesn't want his photoshoot with the Federation of United National Camps (a.k.a. the F.U.N.C.) ruined by the kids of the camp, so he sends the noisy kids climbing up a snowy mountain to get them out of his hair (and motivating them with a Mystery Box most of the kids think has junk inside, but Melvin thinks it has Doopity the Dancing Dolphin and Jessica thinks it has another Sophie).
30	4	"The Bizarre Bout of the Beastly Barfilisk"	Erik Kling	Mark Banker & Jeff D'Elia	Barfilisk	July 19, 2019
George and Harold demand that Mr. Krupp makes the camp fun by having fun activities. After the kids do Krupp's chores disguised as items on a scavenger hunt, Krupp calls the Buntver, George and Harold make a comic where Captain Underpants faces a Barfilisk, a bird whose gaze makes its victims barf rainbows.
31	5	"The Monstrous Mayhem of the Massive Melviathan"	Kevin Peaty	Sindy Boveda Spackman	Melviathan	July 19, 2019
Krupp makes the kids do arts and crafts so he can sell for the worth of the LeisureMyLand. However, an anomaly in their creations sends them into the Dream Dimension Where Dreams Are Reality.
32	6	"The Savage Spite of the Slimy Salamangler"	Seung W. Cha	Mark Banker & Matt Smith	Salamangler	July 19, 2019
When an upper-class camp, Camp Upper Crust, challenges Krupp's campers to a regatta race, it's up to Krupp's campers to win the boat rivalry race so Krupp doesn't close the lake.
33	7	"The Cunning Combat of the Covert Camoflush"	Todd Grimes	Mark Banker & Matt Smith	Camoflush	July 19, 2019
After a paintball game goes wrong, their instructor Major Messy (Lavatore, Mr. Ree's brother who has disappeared after the toilet explosion incident) goes berserk and turns into the Invisible Powered Super Soldier Camoflush, and it's up to Mr. Toiletoire Ree (the janitor and former secret agent working for T.E.R.D.S.) to free the kids.
34	8	"The Bad Beat of the Blah Borelock"	Erik Kling	John Matta	Borelock	July 19, 2019
George and Harold get Mr. Krupp to drop them off in the woods after they decide to copy a show called Stark Rangers (who leave kids in the woods with a glow-stick and a mouthful of water), and Mr. Meaner's stories keep boring the campers. The two make a comic about Borelock, a villain who can turn people into stone by telling his awful stories. But things go wrong when Melvin's VR hat possesses Mr. Meaner.
35	9	"The Ghastly Danger of the Ghost Dentist"	Erik Kling	Mark Banker & Jeff D'Elia	Gumbalina Toothington	July 19, 2019
The campers share scary stories with everyone. When it's George and Harold's turn, they share the story of a dentist named Gumbalina Toothington, which freaks out Mr. Krupp and Melvin. In revenge, Melvin plots to unleash the ghost of Gumbalina Toothington.
36	10	"The Confounding Concoction of the Crooked Combotato"	Kevin Peaty	Mark Banker & Sindy Boveda Spackman	Combotato	July 19, 2019
The campers play a new game called Plot Potato. They have fun, but Melvin is collecting their DNA to make clones loyal to him. It then goes wrong when Melvin accidentally throws a potato into the altered phone booth he was using to fuse the DNA (and blames it on George), causing the potato to mutate into Combotato.
37	11	"The Ludicrous Lunacy of the Loopy Laser Lightmare"	Kevin Peaty	Mark Banker & Jeff D'Elia	Laser Lightmare	July 19, 2019
Mr. Krupp hands out forms to the campers by the F.U.N.C who wants to know what they enjoyed about camp, but not before Erica reveals Krupp wants the forms to become camp director next summer, and the forms turn out terrible, which Melvin gives the idea for Mr. Krupp to deliver fake surveys to F.U.N.C because Melvin has a plan once Krupp becomes camp director for next summer, and Melvin makes a Laser Prison Monster with full security to guard the camp so the other campers have nothing to do about it. Now The M.I.S.F.A.R.T.S. have to escape and stop Mr. Krupp before it's late.
38	12	"The Shocking Showdown of the Staggering Sugamechanger"	Seung W. Cha	Mark Banker & Sindy Boveda Spackman	Sugamechanger	July 19, 2019
Mr. Krupp rebuilds Lake Summer Camp with the things George and Harold have always wanted for Parent's Weekend, such as the water slide, spoons, ponies, running water and everything. Melvin tries to tell everything Krupp gave to George and Harold makes them happy, but if enough kids like the camp, he will take away everything and become camp director for next summer. George and Harold almost believe it and asks Melvin to summon a robot named Sugamechanger.
39	13	"The Polarizing Plight of the Pitiless Poopetrators"	Erik Kling	Mark Banker & Matt Smith	Diaperado (Melvin Sneedly)	July 19, 2019
The camp puts on a talent show after Cash Networth promises to buy it if the talent show is good or not. But Melvin turns it into a real fight by bringing several defeated villains back. With Captain Underpants outnumbered, George and Harold have to even the odds.

=== Specials (2019–20) ===
In October 2019, Netflix released a 46-minute Halloween special of the series titled Hack-a-Ween. In February 2020, an interactive special titled Captain Underpants: Epic Choice O' Rama was released. In December 2020, a 46-minute Christmas special titled Mega Blissmas was released.

Title	Directed by	Written by	Antagonist(s)	Original release date
"The Heartbreaking Havoc of the Haunting Hack-a-Ween"	Seung W. Cha & Kevin Peaty	Mark Banker & Matt Smith	Melvin Sneedly, Balloon Monsters	October 8, 2019
When Melvin and Mr. Krupp declare Halloween illegal, Harold and George decide to make Hack-A-Ween, which becomes a huge success across the school.
"The Interactive Insanity of the Irritating Interlopers"	Todd Grimes	Mark Banker, Peter Hastings & Matt Smith	Mr. Krupp	February 11, 2020
Harold and George need your decision-making skills to stop Mr. Krupp and Melvin from demolishing their beloved treehouse in this interactive special.
"The Xtreme Xploits of the Xplosive Xmas"	Erik Kling & Kevin Peaty	Mark Banker & Matt Smith	Jacked Santa/Mechanaclaus	December 4, 2020
George and Harold love Christmas, but they feel like it could use some upgrades. But when their plan resulting in Christmas being turned into Blissmas goes wrong, George and Harold must find a way to save it before it's gone forever. (Note: This special is listed as "Mega Blissmas". The full title of "The Xtreme Xploits of the Xplosive Xmas" appears in the credits.)

=== Season 4: In Space! (2020) ===
No. overall	No. in season	Title	Directed by	Written by	Antagonist(s)	Original release date
40	1	"The Senseless Torment of the Space Toilet"	Kevin Peaty	Mark Banker & Matt Smith	F.L.U.S.H.E.R.	July 10, 2020
George and Harold convince Mr. Krupp to get P.O.O.P.S.I.E (the Piqua Order Of Professional Space & Interplanetary Explorers). to send Jerome Horwitz Elementary into space, but they soon hear that an experimental project, created by Shifty Fitzgibbons, went wrong and turned into a monster.
41	2	"The Abandoned Artifact of the Absentee Aliens"	Erik Kling	John Matta	The Biglyans	July 10, 2020
The reason why Shifty Fitzgibbons lied about F.L.U.S.H.E.R. being a monster (before it was made into one by Captain Underpants) is that Dupe Licitous wanted to use one of the kids to find an alien spaceship to fly it back to Earth.
42	3	"The Hazardous Hysteria of the Hangry Hypnosinger"	Seung W. Cha	Daniel Dominguez	Hangry Hypnosinger	July 10, 2020
When Melvin got kidnapped by the Biglyans in the last episode, the schoolship goes on a mission to save him, but they're contained in cryo-chambers so they don't go space crazy. All cryo-chambers are set for 3 months, but Krupp set his for 3 hours so he could be the captain of the ship and he spilled plutonium. He later woke George and Harold to have them as minions, but they weren't very good ones due to them not wanting to be minions after they replace all his stuff with tires. They rolled a tire out of the room and it went on the plutonium, and after the tire went to some places, it landed on Dressy Killman's cryo-chamber, which turns her into the Hangry Hypnosinger.
43	4	"The Disturbing Dilemma of the Dysfunctional Döppelgangers"	Erik Kling	Mark Banker & Matt Smith	Utopiqua Kids	July 10, 2020
Everyone is in a panic because the schoolship is going to crash on another planet. It is revealed that Krupp pushed all the buttons during the events of the last episode while he was celebrating as captain, and there is no way to mask his identity since he got guacamole on the controls and he loves guacamole. So the ship crash-lands on an opposite land and water planet color of Earth. The exact destination where the ship crash-lands is in the woods of a town named Utopiqua, where there are blue versions of themselves and Meejor Hithrow Elementary School. They find out that everything and everyone's name here is a sign scramble of their name. They also discover that kids are in charge (kids have their driver's licenses) and adults are their slaves (adults are too old to drive). They have some fun there, but it is revealed that the kids from Utopiqua put adults in a dungeon. So they have to team up with Alien Melvin and Captain Underpants to end the Utopiqua once and for all.
44	5	"The Confusing Crisis of the Conniving Captive"	Kevin Peaty	Mark Banker & Matt Smith	Melvin Sneedly, The Biglyans	July 10, 2020
When Moxie, Fitzgibbons and Krupp arrive at the Biglyan planet, Moxie tells the kids to wait for Melvin's next transmission before they can rescue him, but George and Harold are impatient and would rather send themselves, the M.I.S.F.A.R.T.S., and Mr. Krupp to rescue Melvin.
45	6	"The Aggravated Assault of the Alien Armada"	Seung W. Cha	Mark Banker	The Biglyans	July 10, 2020
When the M.I.S.F.A.R.T.S. are forced to do hard labor, George and Harold find out that the Biglyans are pretending to make Melvin their king so they can enslave the humans. Meanwhile, Dr. Shifty Fitzgibbons turns out to be a Littleite named Itsius Bitsian, and he was unable to help the humans and save Earth, alongside the Monkeys, the Robots, and Moxie Swaggerman, meaning the M.I.S.F.A.R.T.S. and Captain Underpants have to save the Earth by themselves.
