= Dog Man (book series) =

Children's graphic novel series by Dav Pilkey

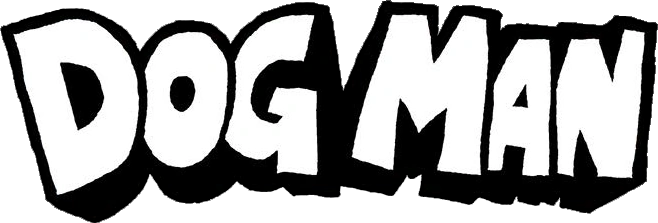
- Logo of the series
- 1. Main series: 2. Dog Man (2016); 3. Dog Man: Unleashed (2016); 4. Dog Man: A Tale of Two Kitties (2017); 5. Dog Man and Cat Kid (2017); 6. Dog Man: Lord of the Fleas (2018); 7. Dog Man: Brawl of the Wild (2018); 8. Dog Man: For Whom the Ball Rolls (2019); 9. Dog Man: Fetch-22 (2019); 10. Dog Man: Grime and Punishment (2020); 11. Dog Man: Mothering Heights (2021); 12. Dog Man: Twenty Thousand Fleas Under the Sea (2023); 13. Dog Man: The Scarlet Shedder (2024); 14. Dog Man: Big Jim Begins (2024); 15. Dog Man: Big Jim Believes (2025); 16. Dog Man: A Sprinkle in Time (2026)
- Author: Dav Pilkey
- Illustrator: Dav Pilkey
- Country: United States
- Language: English
- Genre: Children's literature, Graphic novel, Comedy, Superhero
- Publisher: Scholastic
- Published: 2016–present
- Media type: Print (hardback and paperback)
- No. of books: 15 (main series)

Dog Man is an American children's graphic novel series by author and illustrator Dav Pilkey. A spinoff of Pilkey's Captain Underpants series, Dog Man revolves around the adventures of the titular character, a half-man, half-dog hybrid who works as a police officer.

As of 2026, there are 15 books in the series. The latest book, Dog Man: A Sprinkle in Time, was released on November 3, 2026.

The Dog Man series has received positive reviews from critics, and been popular, selling a total of over 3.8 million copies, 13% of all total comic book sales in 2020, as charted by BookScan.

Starting in 2020, the series received its own spin-off focusing on Dog Man's sidekick Cat Kid, entitled Cat Kid Comic Club. The series has been adapted into two stage musicals, two video games, and an animated film by DreamWorks Animation, Dog Man.

== Premise ==
Within the universe of Captain Underpants, Dog Man was the first comic book character created by George Beard and Harold Hutchins as kindergarteners. (Note: In the novel Captain Underpants and the Terrifying Return of Tippy Tinkletrousers) In the fourth grade, they return to the character with a (somewhat) more mature perspective on the world. (Note: In the novel Captain Underpants and the Sensational Saga of Sir Stinks-A-Lot) George and Harold continue to create Dog Man comics throughout the fifth and sixth grades, and often draw inspiration for the stories from their assigned classic literature readings.

A police officer named Knight and his dog Greg are targeted by Petey, "the world's most evilest cat", and injured in an explosion. Doctors realize they cannot save both of them, but a nurse suggests sewing Greg's head onto Knight's body. The resulting hybrid, Dog Man, has Knight's crime-fighting skills, but Greg's canine personality. As such, his tendency to lick people, indiscriminately chase balls, roll in dead fish and generally make a mess gets on the nerves of his fellow officers, particularly the long-suffering Chief.

In the third book, A Tale of Two Kitties, Petey, hoping to gain a new partner-in-crime, creates a clone of himself, a kitten named Li'l Petey. Unlike his "papa", Li'l Petey is pure-hearted and noble, leading Petey to abandon him. Dog Man adopts Li'l Petey, and together with another creation of Petey's, the robot 80-HD, they form a superhero team called the Supa Buddies. Petey comes to feel remorse for abandoning his clone, and eventually renounces his villainous ways and becomes a true father to Li'l Petey, with Dog Man continuing to have custody of the young kitten on the weekends.

Other major recurring characters are introduced throughout the books, and they include news reporter Sarah Hatoff and her pet poodle Zuzu; Petey's cellmate Big Jim, who moonlights as a superhero called Commander Cupcake; Petey's neglectful father Grampa; reformed villain Flippy, a telekinetic cyborg fish; Molly, a telekinetic and super-intelligent baby frog with the appearance of a tadpole; and the F.L.E.A.S, a trio of evil animals consisting of Piggy the Pig, Crunky the Gorilla, and Bub the Crocodile, who were Petey's childhood friends.

== Novels ==
#	Title	Year
1	Dog Man	2016
A compilation of stories, including: "A Hero is Unleashed": Officer Knight and Greg are injured in an explosion caused by Petey the Cat and combined to become Dog Man. Realizing Dog Man's strength, Petey creates a robot vacuum cleaner to frighten him.; "Robo-Chief": The town's corrupt mayor replaces the Chief with a robot. Petey becomes invisible to escape prison.; "Book 'Em, Dog Man": Petey makes the world stupid by eliminating books in a reading awareness-themed comic the boys wrote in first grade.; "Weenie Wars: The Franks Awaken": Sentient, evil hot dogs run amok after Petey's scheme goes awry.
2	Dog Man: Unleashed	2016
Dog Man is still getting used to his new body. Petey escapes from jail using a cardboard cutout of himself as a distraction, but the cardboard cutout becomes sentient and terrorizes the town. Meanwhile, the Chief's pet fish, Flippy, becomes super-intelligent and bent on world domination.
3	Dog Man: A Tale of Two Kitties	2017
Petey creates a clone of himself, a kitten named Lil' Petey. Petey abandons him for lacking his evil will, and Dog Man adopts the kitten. A remorseful Petey kidnaps him back, and Dog Man must find his young charge while also dealing with the revenge of Flippy, now bionically super-charged.
4	Dog Man and Cat Kid	2017
Dog Man's previous adventures are adapted into a film, and Dog Man is assigned to the film's security detail. Meanwhile, Petey disguises himself as a British nanny in order to get close to Lil' Petey and influence him to be evil.
5	Dog Man: Lord of the Fleas	2018
Dog Man, Lil' Petey, and 80-HD the robot are the Supa Buddies. They are called into action when Petey's childhood friends, Piggy, Bub and Crunky, return to exact their revenge on him for an incident in their youth by targeting Lil' Petey. Petey struggles with the idea of becoming a good guy.
6	Dog Man: Brawl of the Wild	2018
Dog Man is framed for a crime he didn't commit and put in Dog Jail, and his friends must prove his innocence. The now-microscopic F.L.E.A.S. return to wreak havoc at the premiere of Dog Man: The Movie.
7	Dog Man: For Whom the Ball Rolls	2019
Dog Man successfully breaks his habit of chasing balls by conditioning himself to fear them, but a nefarious villain uses ball-shaped contraptions to commit robberies. Petey is released from jail, and Lil' Petey arranges a reunion between Petey and his own estranged father. The F.L.E.A.S. hypnotize Petey's cellmate Big Jim into becoming a superhero named Commander Cupcake.
8	Dog Man: Fetch-22	2019
Dog Man and Petey get used to sharing custody of Lil' Petey. A disgruntled children's show host takes advantage of a group of angry telekinetic tadpoles. Grampa escapes from prison by impersonating Petey.
9	Dog Man: Grime and Punishment	2020
Dog Man is fired from the force after angering the mayor and disguises himself as a cat to rejoin. Grampa escapes from prison using a device that turns the user into a muscle bound monster, and brings a paper lunch bag to life. Petey and Lil' Petey argue about forgiveness.
10	Dog Man: Mothering Heights	2021
Dog Man helps the Chief woo Nurse Lady. Sarah Hatoff interviews Petey about his life story and Lil' Petey and Molly tag along. Grampa escapes from prison again and uses living spray to turn sippy cups into monsters.
11	Dog Man: Twenty Thousand Fleas Under the Sea	2023
Dog Man accompanies Chief and Nurse Lady on their first date. Petey tries to rebuild his lab but finds no one is willing to help an ex-villain. The F.L.E.A.S. break out of jail, but the reformed Bub and Crunky join a group of bugs to become the Friendly Friends, leading Piggy to exact his revenge on them, Petey and Dog Man.
12	Dog Man: The Scarlet Shedder	2024
Dog Man is dyed red by tomato juice after being sprayed by a skunk. With Chief on his honeymoon, replacement chief Maude, who despises Dog Man, teams up with a corrupt judge to have Dog Man jailed. Petey makes a deal with Dr. Scum to build a robot replica to take Dog Man's place in jail in exchange for becoming Scum's henchman, a deal that weighs heavily on the former villain.
13	Dog Man: Big Jim Begins	2024
Big Jim allows Grampa to become his sidekick, and Jim tells possibly made up stories from his childhood. Cute aliens named the Space Cuties lure the heroes (minus Dog Man) into a trap, leaving Grampa, Jim and Dog Man to defeat them with hugs.
14	Dog Man: Big Jim Believes	2025
Picking up where the last book left off, the heroes continue to fight the Space Cuties while reminiscing about their pasts.
15	Dog Man: A Sprinkle in Time	2026
The heroes team up to rescue Nurse Lady when she is captured by Professor Puddin' Pop. Meanwhile, Grampa travels to a different timeline where he never existed.

== Reception ==
Dog Man has received positive reviews from book critics. Darienne Stewart of Common Sense Media rated the first two books four stars out of five, saying that the first book Dog Man was "riotous, silly fun with soft touch by Underpants creator", and the second book, Dog Man: Unleashed has "half-man, half-dog, all-heart hero delights in silly sequel".

== Accolades ==
Awards and honors for Dog Man
Year	Award	Category	Book	Result	Reference
2018	Ringo Award	Best Kids Comic or Graphic Novel	A Tale of Two Kitties	Shortlisted	
2020	Ringo Award	Best Kids Comic or Graphic Novel	For Whom the Ball Rolls	Shortlisted	
2020	Ringo Award	Best Original Graphic Novel	For Whom the Ball Rolls	Shortlisted	
2024	Harvey Award	Best Children's Book	The Scarlet Shedder	Shortlisted	

== Adaptations ==
=== Musicals ===
A musical based on the series, titled Dog Man: The Musical, was produced Off-Broadway by TheatreWorksUSA in 2019, with music by Brad Alexander and a book and lyrics by Kevin Del Aguila. After its debut in New York City, the musical embarked on a North American tour, returning to Off-Broadway in 2023. As of 2025, the musical continues to tour venues throughout the United States.

In 2023, Cat Kid Comic Club: The Musical premiered Off-Broadway. Written and produced by the same team, the musical is an adaptation of the Cat Kid Comic Club series.

=== Video games ===
A video game entitled Dog Man: Mission Impawsible was released by Mindscape on December 6, 2024. Created as a 2-D side-scrolling platformer, the game follows Dog Man, Li'l Petey, and 80-HD, who work together to track down the key to the city after it is stolen by the F.L.E.A.S.

A second video game entitled Dog Man: Bark in Action was released on October 27, 2026.

=== Films ===
A feature film based on Dog Man was released by Universal Pictures and DreamWorks Animation on January 31, 2025. The film was written and directed by Peter Hastings, who previously worked on The Epic Tales of Captain Underpants. The titular character's vocal effects were provided by Hastings, alongside Pete Davidson as Petey, Lil Rel Howery as the Chief, Isla Fisher as Sarah Hatoff, Ricky Gervais as Flippy, and Stephen Root as Grampa. The film received positive reviews. A sequel is in development.

== See also ==
- Captain Underpants
- The Adventures of Super Diaper Baby
- The Adventures of Ook and Gluk: Kung-Fu Cavemen from the Future
