= The Adventures of Super Diaper Baby =

2002 children's graphic novel by Dav Pilkey

- First edition cover
- Author: Dav Pilkey (credited as George Beard)
- Illustrator: Dav Pilkey (credited as Harold Hutchins)
- Language: English
- Series: Captain Underpants
- Genre: Children's novel
- Publisher: Blue Sky; Scholastic
- Publication date: February 5, 2002 (black and white); August 5, 2025 (color edition)
- Publication place: United States
- Media type: Print (paperback)
- Pages: 128 (paperback); 144 (hardcover)
- ISBN: 9780545385794
- Followed by: Super Diaper Baby 2: The Invasion of the Potty Snatchers

The Adventures of Super Diaper Baby is a 2002 children's graphic novel by American author Dav Pilkey, credited on the cover as in-universe authors George Beard and Harold Hutchins. The book is a spin-off of Pilkey's Captain Underpants series. It follows a baby named Billy who gains superpowers shortly after birth. Billy teams up with a super-powered dog, Diaper Dog, to fight Diaper Dog's former master, a sentient piece of feces named Deputy Dangerous.

== Plot ==
=== Introduction ===
Fourth-graders George Beard and Harold Hutchins are caught skating over ketchup packets in the school gym by their mean-spirited principal, Mr. Krupp. Krupp has them write a 100-page essay on "good citizenship," and specifically banning them from creating a Captain Underpants comic instead. The boys find a loophole and instead create a comic book about a different superhero called "Super Diaper Baby", to Krupp's disdainful surprise.

=== Plot ===
Expectant couple Bill and Mary Hoskins rush to the hospital; meanwhile, Deputy Dangerous and his talking pet dog, Danger Dog, trap Captain Underpants and drain him of his superpowers. They convert the superpowers into juice, intending to share it to give themselves powers. Danger Dog drinks half of the juice, but the police come to arrest them before the Deputy gets a chance to drink. They run away from the police, ending up below the hospital.

At the hospital, Mary gives birth to a boy, naming him Billy. The attending doctor gives Billy a "spank of life", accidentally jettisoning him out of the window in the process. He lands in Deputy Dangerous' container of juice and drinks it, gaining superpowers and becoming Super Diaper Baby, before returning the favour to the doctor for spanking him. Billy then overpowers Deputy Dangerous and Danger Dog, who are arrested.

Danger Dog and Deputy Dangerous break out of jail and escape to their secret lab, where the Deputy invents a crib device that would transmit Billy's powers to him at midnight, which they deliver to the Hoskins under pseudonyms. Billy soils himself before midnight, so Mary takes him for a bath and leaves his soiled diaper in the crib. The device then activates and transmits Billy's excrement to Deputy Dangerous, turning him into a small, living piece of feces. The next morning, Deputy Dangerous invents a robotic ant mecha-suit and intends to use it to destroy the city as an act of revenge. Danger Dog does not take the Deputy's efforts seriously, calling him "Deputy Doo-Doo" and choosing to cause mischief instead of destruction.

Billy's parents see the giant robotic ant, scaring them. Billy leaves his home to defeat it, but after a brief battle is captured by Deputy Doo-Doo, who throws him into the cooling tower of a nearby nuclear power plant. Danger Dog flies into the tower, saving Billy, while Deputy Doo-Doo falls into the tower instead. Inside, the radiation from the plant makes the Deputy grow to giant size. Meanwhile, Billy's family adopts Danger Dog and puts a diaper on him to placate their landlord, renaming him Diaper Dog.

Deputy Doo-Doo continues his destruction of the city and Billy and Diaper Dog seek to stop him. They trick him into attacking himself and wrap him up in a giant roll of toilet paper from a nearby store roof before flying him to Uranus. Billy and Diaper Dog order superpower juice at a bar in space on the way back and give it to Captain Underpants (who is still trapped), restoring his powers.

== Characters ==
- Billy Hoskins/Super Diaper Baby – The book's protagonist, a newborn baby who gains super powers shortly after his birth.
- Danger/Diaper Dog – The Hoskins' pet dog and Super Diaper Baby's sidekick. Previously allied with Deputy Dangerous, but by his own confession was "in it for the kibbles".
- Deputy Dangerous/Doo-Doo – The main antagonist. He is transformed into a piece of feces during an attempt to steal Super Diaper Baby's powers.

=== Additional characters ===
- Bill and Mary Hoskins - Billy's parents.
- Captain Underpants - The title character of the Captain Underpants book series, appearing in a minor role.
- The Doctor - The unnamed doctor responsible for delivering Billy.

=== Foreword characters ===
- George Beard - The in-universe author of the book.
- Harold Hutchins - The in-universe illustrator of the book.
- Mr. Krupp - The principal of Jerome Horwitz Elementary School, who finds the books in the Super Diaper Baby series offensive.

== Development ==
While developing Captain Underpants and the Wrath of the Wicked Wedgie Woman, Dav Pilkey began exploring ideas for a standalone book containing a collection of comics, written by the characters George and Harold. One of these ideas was a story called Super Diaper Baby, loosely inspired by a comic Pilkey had drawn as a child called Diaper Man. While sketching early designs for cover art, Pilkey grew to like the concept and decided to expand the story into its own book.

== Super Diaper Baby 2: The Invasion of the Potty Snatchers ==
Super Diaper Baby 2: The Invasion of the Potty Snatchers
- First Edition Cover
- Author: Dav Pilkey (credited as George Beard)
- Illustrator: Dav Pilkey (credited as Harold Hutchins)
- Language: English
- Series: Captain Underpants series
- Genre: Children's literature
- Publisher: Blue Sky (US); Scholastic (US)
- Publication date: June 28, 2011 (black and white); August 4, 2026 (color edition)
- Publication place: United States
- Media type: Print (Paperback)
- Pages: 192
- ISBN: 9780545175326
- Preceded by: The Adventures of Super Diaper Baby

Super Diaper Baby 2: The Invasion of the Potty Snatchers is the second book in the series. Initially advertised on the final page of the first book, its release took longer than Dav Pilkey initially anticipated due needing to care for his terminally ill father, who died in 2008. The sequel was eventually published on June 28, 2011, billed as The Third Graphic Novel by George Beard and Harold Hutchins. This book also featured the debut of Petey the Cat, a villain who would later appear prominently in Pilkey's Dog Man series.

=== Introduction ===
The book picks up directly after the end of the first book's introduction. Mr. Krupp becomes furious at the comic George and Harold turned in as their 100-page "essay", objecting to its scatological humour. When the boys struggle to think of something to write that does not involve poop, Krupp shows them a book from his childhood, How the Grinch Stole Christmas! with the last seven pages torn out, which he believes is more realistic. Upon reading it, George and Harold once again find a loophole are inspired to make a sequel to Super Diaper Baby about pee instead. This new book similarly offends Krupp, who sends the pair to detention.

=== Plot ===
The Hoskins and Diaper Dog set up a picnic in the park. Billy and Diaper Dog end up committing various acts of heroism, which leaves Mr. Hoskins feeling depressed and inadequate. After a reminder by his wife, he decides to read Mechafrog and Robotoad are Enemies to Billy. However, Billy can now read it to him, instead, due to the powers he gained in the previous book, much to Mr. Hoskins' dismay. Meanwhile, two criminals called Dr. Dilbert Dinkle and Petey the Cat sneak into Jim's Bank, intent on robbing it using an invention that turns solid matter into water. However, Petey accidentally activates the machine, turning Dinkle into a living water creature. Petey then accidentally destroys the invention, leaving Dinkle stuck in this state. Dinkle realises that he is able to turn into a puddle, sneak into the vault, and steal the money. Back at his home, Dinkle decides that being made of water means he no longer needs to pay his water bill - subsequently his supply is cut off after two weeks, to Petey's chagrin. Petey drinks Dinkle while the latter sleeps.

The next morning, Petey urinates out Dr. Dinkle, who discovers that he is now made out of urine. Petey dubs him "Rip Van Tinkle," to Dinkle's objection. Rip van Tinkle leaves to spend his stolen money, but every store he visits kicks him out for his smell.

The following night, in a sequence parodying How the Grinch Stole Christmas!, Tinkle creates a new invention, the Robo Kitty 3000, before he evaporates himself and rains pee onto the town below. The pee drops break into houses and steal all the town's toilets, which are then destroyed by the Robo Kitty 3000, piloted by Petey. One drop is caught by Billy, so it tricks him into thinking that it is merely taking the toilet for repair, gives him a juice box and sends him to bed.

The next day, the lack of toilets leaves everyone with a desperate need to urinate. Mr. and Mrs. Hoskins put on diapers to solve the problem, while the mayor decides to drain the local pool for everyone to pee in. Rip van Tinkle reconstitutes himself, while Petey steals diapers to sell to the people who were robbed of toilets. After an argument over who should get the money from their trickery, Petey soaks up Tinkle with a giant roll of toilet paper from a nearby store, flicking one final drop of pee away. Super Diaper Baby and Diaper Dog arrive, only for Petey to transform the Robo Kitty 3000 into the Supa-Mecha Kitty 3000. Realising they cannot defeat Petey conventionally, Super Diaper Baby flies to buy a large tub of catnip and pours it into the Super-Mecha Kitty 3000's control dome. Petey goes crazy after smelling the catnip, bounces around, and detaches the Supa-Mecha Kitty 3000's head in a fit of glee. Super Diaper Baby and Diaper Dog grab Petey and carry him to jail.

The drop of pee Petey flicked away earlier lands in the pee-filled pool, where it grows into an enlarged Rip Van Tinkle. Super Diaper Baby and Diaper Dog find him wreaking havoc at the train tracks. Using a passing train as nunchucks, Rip Van Tinkle overpowers the two and smashes a building on top of them. Super Diaper Baby remembers that a week before, he put his juice box in the freezer and it froze solid, giving Diaper Dog an idea. The two push down on the Earth, moving it farther from the Sun and lowering the outside temperature, and Rip Van Tinkle freezes. Diaper Dog and Super Diaper Baby carry Rip Van Tinkle away, while Super Diaper Baby gets an idea of how to cheer up his father.

Back at the Hoskins' house, Billy tells Mr. Hoskins that there is an ice monster outside, requesting his father's help in defeating it. Diaper Dog tricks Mr. Hoskins into thinking that the "ice monster" is "scared" of Mr. Hoskins, before lifting Tinkle up and depositing him on Uranus (where Deputy Doo-Doo is still visible). They return to Earth, and a news reporter takes a picture of them with Mr. and Mrs. Hoskins, for a newspaper article titled: "Diaper Clad Dad Saves The Earth!".

== Unproduced third book ==
In 2011, Dav Pilkey stated in an interview with Scholastic that the series was expected to have three books, stating, "I only have three planned, but I’m sure I’ll think of more some day."

In Captain Underpants and the Tyrannical Retaliation of the Turbo Toilet 2000, George and Harold make a comic titled Super Diaper Baby 2½, seriving as an in-universe sequel to Super Diaper Baby 2: The Invasion of the Potty Snatchers as well as a crossover with the character Dog Man. At the time, Pilkey stated on his website that Super Diaper Baby 2½ was the first half of a 48-page comic that would be explored in a third Super Diaper Baby book titled Super Diaper Baby 3: Petey’s Revenge. The book was never released and all mentions of it were eventually removed from Pilkey's website.

== Reception ==
Super Diaper Baby series received positive reviews from book critics.

Barbara Schultz of Common Sense Media gave the first book three stars out of five, calling it "really pretty hilarious." She praised the art as "adorable." However, she also noticed the humor involved with "almost all the bathroom variety, and it is so funny to kids that they will read it and talk about it many more times than adults might want."

=== Controversy ===
Super Diaper Baby has frequently been banned and challenged and was on the American Library Association's lists of the 100 most banned and challenged books between 2000 and 2009, at 47th place, and between 2010 and 2019, at 41st place."

Super Diaper Baby was challenged in the Riverside Unified School District for being inappropriate for children due to its excessive toilet humor and intentionally misspelled words. A committee voted 5–2 to reject its removal.

The book was removed at the Channelview Independent School District after an elementary student was suspended for a day after calling another student a "poo poo head."
