= Horace Splattly =

Children's book series

Horace Splattly is a series of six children's books written by Lawrence David and illustrated by Barry Gott, published between 2002 and 2004 by Puffin Books. The eponymous Horace Splattly becomes the superhero The Cupcaked Crusader whenever he eats cupcakes baked by his sister.

== Series ==
1. Horace Splattly: The Cupcaked Crusader (2002)
2. When Second Graders Attack (2002)
3. The Terror of the Pink Dodo Balloons (2003)
4. To Catch a Clownosaurus (2003)
5. The Invasion of the Shag Carpet Creature (2004)
6. The Most Evil, Friendly Villain Ever (2004)

== Reception ==
The series has frequently been compared with Dav Pilkey's Captain Underpants series, but not always positively.

Initially the books were praised. Of the first book, the School Library Journal said that it had a "quick pace and silly characters" and Kirkus Reviews that "this caped crusader rises hilariously to meet each challenge." Kirkus later wrote that the second book "provides plenty of creative twists, danger, and excitement".

But by the third book of the series, responses to the new volume had become more negative. School Library Journal said that it "never makes the absurd seem believable" and also criticized the characters. Kirkus complained that "the premise is wearing thin", but did add that it still had "enough gags and zany twists in the tale to keep fans turning the pages", and the Midwest Book Review thought that it was a "whimsical, zany adventure".

Several reviewers have praised Barry Gott for his illustrations. The Midwest Book Review called them "fun", Kirkus Reviews said that they "capture the general sense of goofiness perfectly" and the School Library Journal said the "[h]umorous illustrations add to the lighthearted tone".
