= Captain Underpants and the Preposterous Plight of the Purple Potty People =

Book by Dav Pilkey

- First edition cover
- Author: Dav Pilkey
- Illustrator: Dav Pilkey
- Language: English
- Series: Captain Underpants series
- Genre: Children's novel, comic science fiction
- Publisher: Blue Sky (US), Scholastic (US)
- Publication date: August 15, 2006 (black-and-white); August 13, 2019 (full color)
- Publication place: United States
- Media type: Print (Paperback) (Hardcover)
- Pages: 176
- ISBN: 9780545385749
- Preceded by: Captain Underpants and the Big, Bad Battle of the Bionic Booger Boy Part 2: The Revenge of the Ridiculous Robo-Boogers
- Followed by: Captain Underpants and the Terrifying Return of Tippy Tinkletrousers

Captain Underpants and the Preposterous Plight of the Purple Potty People is the eighth book in the Captain Underpants series by Dav Pilkey. It was published on August 15, 2006, two years and eleven months after the release of the previous book. This was the last Captain Underpants book to be published for 6 years, until Captain Underpants and the Terrifying Re-Turn of Tippy Tinkletrousers was published in 2012.

== Plot ==
George Beard, Harold Hutchins, Sulu, and Crackers have now ended up in an alternate universe in Melvin's time machine, where the whole world is the opposite of their normal world. For example, Melvin Sneedly is dumb and struggling to comprehend a simple children's book (which contains content considered offensive in the normal universe), the teachers are nice, the school is better, all the previous villains are good, normal citizens, and Mr. Krupp is nice and has a sense of humor. George and Harold soon see evil versions of themselves and learn through one of their evil twins' comics that they had turned their Mr. Krupp into an evil supervillain named Captain Blunderpants. Sulu and Crackers are kidnapped by Evil George and Evil Harold, hypnotized to become evil, and then ordered to destroy George and Harold. Sulu immediately attacks, but Crackers saves them.

George, Harold, and Crackers escape to their normal dimension and head to the treehouse, unaware that Nice Mr. Krupp, Sulu, Evil George, and Evil Harold have followed them. Evil George and Evil Harold transform Nice Mr. Krupp into Captain Blunderpants by dousing him with water. Meanwhile, George and Harold decide to head back to the other dimension to rescue and de-hypnotize Sulu, and to take the 3D Hypno-Ring and Extra Strength Super Power Juice, just in case. However, Mr. Beard stops George and Harold from leaving the house and forces them to come inside so they can eat with George's great-grandmother and Harold's grandfather at George's house for Grandparent's Day dinner. While George and Harold try to explain that they need to leave, their grandparents unknowingly drink the rest of the Extra Strength Super Power Juice as they read a comic George and Harold wrote.

Soon, Evil George and Evil Harold find the treehouse, rummage through it, and find the "Goosy-Grow 4000", which they use to transform Sulu into a giant monster. Sulu charges at George and Harold, but Crackers flies in and carries George and Harold away while Sulu attacks the city, and Evil George, Evil Harold, and Captain Blunderpants rob a bank. When George and Harold try to drink the Extra Strength Super Power Juice, they discover it is empty, even though there had been a third of it earlier. With only one plan left, they turn Mr. Krupp into Captain Underpants, who defeats Sulu. Evil George, Evil Harold, and Captain Blunderpants return from robbing the bank, and order Captain Blunderpants to fight Captain Underpants, but George snaps his finger and turns Captain Blunderpants back into Nice Mr. Krupp, having learned how to do so from the double's comic.

Captain Underpants ties the alternate counterparts up, but a rainstorm suddenly hits and turns Nice Mr. Krupp back into Captain Blunderpants and Captain Underpants back into Mr. Krupp. George and Harold try to snap their fingers, but the rain is pouring down too hard on them. Mr. Krupp goes back home while Captain Blunderpants frees himself and Evil George and Evil Harold. George and Harold fly away on Crackers while the doubles pursue them.

After arriving at the Treehouse, George finds the Shrinky-Pig 2000, which they could use to shrink their counterparts. Captain Blunderpants then grabs the two by their shirts while Evil George and Evil Harold take the Shrinky-Pig 2000. Before Captain Blunderpants can finish off George and Harold, George and Harold's grandparents arrive and order Captain Blunderpants to put down their grandchildren, but he refuses, causing George and Harold's grandparents to transform into Boxer Boy and Great-Granny Girdle. They then battle and defeat Captain Blunderpants, saving their grandchildren.

However, Evil George and Evil Harold appear and plan to use the Shrinky-Pig 2000 on George, Harold, and their grandparents, but Harold uses reverse psychology and claims they can go right ahead, as they are holding the device backward. Evil George and Evil Harold believe this and turn the Shrinky-Pig 2000 around before activating it, resulting in themselves being shrunk. After punishing the evil twins by spanking them, George and Harold's grandparents fly off for a romantic dinner, George and Harold de-hypnotize and shrink Sulu back to normal, and then take Evil George, Evil Harold, and Captain Blunderpants back to their own universe.

Two policemen arrive to arrest George and Harold, mistaking them for their evil counterparts. Suddenly, a robotic pair of pants appears, piloted by Tippy Tinkletrousers. When the cops laugh at his name, he freezes them with his Freeze Beam 4000, then chases George, Harold, Sulu, and Crackers.

== Reception ==
Reviews for the book were mostly positive, with Kidsreads.com praising the entry.

== See also ==
- Captain Underpants
