= Captain Underpants =

Children's illustrated novel series by Dav Pilkey

- Franchise logo
- Created by: Dav Pilkey
- Original work: The Adventures of Captain Underpants (1997)
- Owners: Scholastic Corporation; DreamWorks Animation (Universal Pictures) (film and television rights)
- Years: 1997–present

Print publications
- Books: The Captain Underpants Extra-Crunchy Book o' Fun (2001); The All-New Captain Underpants Extra-Crunchy Book o' Fun 2 (2002)
- Novels: List of novels: The Adventures of Captain Underpants (1997); Captain Underpants and the Attack of the Talking Toilets (1999); Captain Underpants and the Invasion of the Incredibly Naughty Cafeteria Ladies from Outer Space (and the Subsequent Assault of the Equally Evil Lunchroom Zombie Nerds) (1999); Captain Underpants and the Perilous Plot of Professor Poopypants (2000); Captain Underpants and the Wrath of the Wicked Wedgie Woman (2001); Captain Underpants and the Big, Bad Battle of the Bionic Booger Boy (2003); Captain Underpants and the Preposterous Plight of the Purple Potty People (2006); Captain Underpants and the Terrifying Return of Tippy Tinkletrousers (2012); Captain Underpants and the Revolting Revenge of the Radioactive Robo-Boxers (2013); Captain Underpants and the Tyrannical Retaliation of the Turbo Toilet 2000 (2014); Captain Underpants and the Sensational Saga of Sir Stinks-A-Lot (2015)
- Comics: Dog Man (2016–present); Cat Kid Comic Club (2020–present)
- Graphic novels: The Adventures of Super Diaper Baby (2002); The Adventures of Ook and Gluk: Kung-Fu Cavemen from the Future (2010); Super Diaper Baby 2: The Invasion of the Potty Snatchers (2011); Captain Underpants Manga (2026–present)

Films and television
- Films: Captain Underpants: The First Epic Movie (2017); Dog Man (2025)
- Animated series: The Epic Tales of Captain Underpants (2018–2020)
- Television specials: The Spooky Tale of Captain Underpants: Hack-a-Ween (2019); Captain Underpants: Epic Choice-o-Rama (2020); The Epic Tales of Captain Underpants: Mega Blissmas (2020)

Theatrical presentations
- Musicals: Dog Man: The Musical (2019); Cat Kid Comic Club: The Musical (2023)

Games
- Video games: Dog Man: Mission Impawsible (2024); Dog Man: Bark in Action (2026)

Audio
- Soundtracks: Captain Underpants: The First Epic Movie (Original Motion Picture Soundtrack) (2017); Dog Man (Original Motion Picture Soundtrack) (2025)

Captain Underpants is an American illustrated children's novel series and multimedia franchise created by author and illustrator Dav Pilkey. The series revolves around two fourth graders, George Beard and Harold Hutchins, living in Piqua, Ohio, and Captain Underpants, an aptly named superhero from one of the boys' homemade comic books, who accidentally becomes real when George and Harold hypnotize their cruel, bossy, and ill-tempered principal, Mr. Krupp.

As of 2026, the series includes 12 main novels, two activity books, colored versions, and 4 spin-off series with 24 books in total for all 4 of them. The series has been translated into more than 37 languages, with more than 90 million books sold worldwide, including over 50 million in the United States.

In 2015, the original novel series concluded with a 12th book, Captain Underpants and the Sensational Saga of Sir Stinks-A-Lot. The finale was followed by a spin-off series titled Dog Man, released the following year in 2016.

Since its debut in 1997, Captain Underpants has been among the most frequently challenged books in American schools and libraries, as educators hold varied opinions regarding the series. Despite the controversy, the series has continued to have success, and began releasing manga adaptations of the books starting in April 2026.

DreamWorks Animation acquired the rights to the series to make an animated feature film adaptation, Captain Underpants: The First Epic Movie, which was released on June 2, 2017, followed by a television series, The Epic Tales of Captain Underpants, which aired on Netflix from July 13, 2018 to December 4, 2020.

== Novels ==
=== Captain Underpants novels ===
1. The Adventures of Captain Underpants (1997)
2. Captain Underpants and the Attack of the Talking Toilets (1999)
3. Captain Underpants and the Invasion of the Incredibly Naughty Cafeteria Ladies from Outer Space (and the Subsequent Assault of the Equally Evil Lunchroom Zombie Nerds) (1999)
4. Captain Underpants and the Perilous Plot of Professor Poopypants (2000)
5. Captain Underpants and the Wrath of the Wicked Wedgie Woman (2001)
6. Captain Underpants and the Big, Bad Battle of the Bionic Booger Boy, Part 1: The Night of the Nasty Nostril Nuggets (2003)
7. Captain Underpants and the Big, Bad Battle of the Bionic Booger Boy, Part 2: The Revenge of the Ridiculous Robo-Boogers (2003)
8. Captain Underpants and the Preposterous Plight of the Purple Potty People (2006)
9. Captain Underpants and the Terrifying Return of Tippy Tinkletrousers (2012)
10. Captain Underpants and the Revolting Revenge of the Radioactive Robo-Boxers (2013)
11. Captain Underpants and the Tyrannical Retaliation of the Turbo Toilet 2000 (2014)
12. Captain Underpants and the Sensational Saga of Sir Stinks-A-Lot (2015)

=== Captain Underpants in Full Color ===
- The Adventures of Captain Underpants (2013; 25 1/2th Anniversary Edition, 2023)
- Captain Underpants and the Attack of the Talking Toilets (2014)
- Captain Underpants and the Invasion of the Incredibly Naughty Cafeteria Ladies from Outer Space (and the Subsequent Assault of the Equally Evil Lunchroom Zombie Nerds) (2014)
- Captain Underpants and the Perilous Plot of Professor Poopypants (2015)
- Captain Underpants and the Wrath of the Wicked Wedgie Woman (2017)
- Captain Underpants and the Big, Bad Battle of the Bionic Booger Boy Part 1: The Night of the Nasty Nostril Nuggets (2018)
- Captain Underpants and the Big, Bad Battle of the Bionic Booger Boy Part 2: the Revenge of the Ridiculous Robo-Boogers (2018)
- Captain Underpants and the Preposterous Plight of the Purple Potty People (2019)
- Captain Underpants and the Terrifying Re-Turn of Tippy Tinkletrousers (2019)
- Captain Underpants and the Revolting Revenge of the Radioactive Robo-Boxers (2020)
- Captain Underpants and the Tyrannical Retaliation of the Turbo Toilet 2000 (2021)
- Captain Underpants and the Sensational Saga of Sir Stinks-A-Lot (2022)

=== Captain Underpants manga ===
- Captain Underpants: The First Epic Manga (2026)
- Captain Underpants and the Attack of the Talking Toilets: The Second Epic Manga (2027)

=== Captain Underpants activity books ===
1. The Captain Underpants Extra-Crunchy Book o' Fun (2001)
2. The All-New Captain Underpants Extra-Crunchy Book o' Fun 2 (2002)
3. The Captain Underpants Super Silly Sticker Studio (2005)
4. The Extra Big 'N' Extra Crunchy Captain Underpants Book o' Fun (2008)
5. The Epic Tales of Captain Underpants: Let's Roll! Sticker Activity Book (2020)
6. Full Color The Captain Underpants Double Crunchy Book o' Fun (2022)

=== Captain Underpants collectors' editions ===
1. The Adventures of Captain Underpants: Collectors' Edition (2005)
2. Captain Underpants and the Attack of the Talking Toilets: Collectors' Edition (2007)
3. Captain Underpants and the Invasion of the Incredibly Naughty Cafeteria Ladies from Outer Space (and the Subsequent Assault of the Equally-Evil Lunchroom Zombie Nerds): Collectors' Edition (2008)

=== Captain Underpants collections ===
- The Tra-La-La Riffic Captain Underpants Collection/The First Captain Underpants Collection (Books 1–4; 1997–2000)
- Three More Wedgie-Powered Adventures in One (Books 4–6; 2006)
- The Second Captain Underpants Collection/The Tra-La-Larious Captain Underpants (Books 5–7 & Super Diaper Baby; 2001–2003)
- Captain Underpants: Three Pantastic Novels in One (Books 1–3; 1997–99)
- The New Captain Underpants Collection (Books 1–5; 1997–2000)
- The Tra-La-La Tremendous Captain Underpants Collection (Books 5–8; 2001–2006)
- The Complete Captain Underpants Collection (Books 1–8; 1997–2006)
- The Captain Underpants Collectors' Edition Collection (Books 1–3 + 3 CD-ROMs; 1997–1999, 2005–2008)

=== Captain Underpants spin-offs ===
1. The Adventures of Super Diaper Baby (2002) (color edition in 2025)
2. The Adventures of Ook and Gluk: Kung-Fu Cavemen from the Future (2010) (discontinued in 2021)
3. Super Diaper Baby 2: The Invasion of the Potty Snatchers (2011) (color edition in 2026)

== Characters ==
=== Overview ===
List indicators:

- A dark gray cell indicates that the character was not in the property or that the character's presence in the property has yet to be announced.
- A Main indicates a character had a starring role in the property.
- A Supporting indicates the character appeared in two or more times within the property.
- A Guest indicates the character appeared once in the property.

Character	Book series												Captain Underpants: The First Epic Movie	The Epic Tales				
Character	1	2	3	4	5	6	7	8	9	10	11	12	Captain Underpants: The First Epic Movie	1	2	3	4	Special
Character		1997	1999	2000	2001		2003	2003	2006	2012	2013	2014	2015	2017	2018-2020			
Character	Main characters																	
George Beard	Main	Main	Main	Main	Main	Main	Main	Main	Main	Main	Main	Main	Main	Main	Main	Main	Main	Main
Harold Hutchins	Main	Main	Main	Main	Main	Main	Main	Main	Main	Main	Main	Main	Main	Main	Main	Main	Main	Main
Benjamin Krupp Captain Underpants	Main	Main	Main	Main	Main	Main	Main	Main	Main	Main	Main	Main	Main	Main	Main	Main	Main	Main
Sulu						Main	Main	Main		Main	Mentioned	Mentioned						
Crackers							Main	Main		Main	Mentioned	Mentioned						
Yesterday George Beard											Main	Main						
Yesterday Harold Hutchins											Main	Main						
Tony											Guest	Main						
Dawn											Guest	Main						
Orlando											Guest	Main						
Lunchlady Edith													Main					
Erica Wang														Main	Main	Main	Main	Main
Dressy Killman														Main	Main	Main	Main	Main
Villains
Doctor Diaper	Main			Guest				Mentioned	Mentioned	Guest								
Melvin Sneedly Bionic Booger Boy Big Melvin		Main	Guest	Guest	Guest	Main	Main	Mentioned	Mentioned	Guest	Main	Guest	Main	Main	Main	Main	Main	Main
Turbo Toilet 2000		Main		Guest		Guest		Mentioned	Mentioned	Guest	Main		Main					
Zorx			Main					Mentioned	Mentioned				Guest					
Klax			Main					Mentioned	Mentioned				Guest					
Jennifer			Main					Mentioned	Mentioned				Guest					
The Deliriously, Dangerous, Death-Defying Dandelion of Doom			Main															
Tippy Tinkletrousers Professor Pippy Pee-Pee "P" Diarrheastien Poopypants Esq.				Main	Guest			Guest	Main	Main		Guest	Main					
Tara Ribble Wedgie Woman	Guest	Guest	Guest	Guest	Main	Main			Guest		Guest	Guest	Guest	Recurring	Recurring	Recurring	Recurring	Recurring
Carl						Guest	Main	Mentioned										
Trixie						Guest	Main	Mentioned										
Frankenbooger						Guest	Main	Mentioned										
Evil George Beard								Main										
Evil Harold Hutchins								Main										
Captain Blunderpants								Main										
Giant Evil Sulu								Main										
Kipper Krupp and his Goons									Main	Guest								
Zombie Nerd George Beard and Zombie Nerd Harold Hutchins									Guest	Guest								
Kenny Brian Meaner Coach / Sir Stinks-A-Lot	Guest	Guest		Guest	Guest			Mentioned			Supporting	Main	Guest	Recurring	Recurring	Recurring	Recurring	Recurring
Teachers
Miss Edith Anthrope		Guest	Guest	Supporting	Supporting	Main	Main				Main	Guest	Main	Recurring	Recurring	Recurring	Recurring	Recurring
Mr. Morty Fyde			Main	Main	Supporting	Supporting	Supporting						Guest	Guest				
Miss Singerbrains							Main	Mentioned										
Mr. Riles Rected				Guest	Guest						Guest	Guest	Supporting	Recurring	Recurring	Recurring	Recurring	Recurring
Ms. Dayken					Guest								Guest					
Students
Jessica Gordon	Guest	Guest	Guest	Guest	Guest						Guest	Guest	Guest	Recurring	Recurring	Recurring	Recurring	Recurring
Gooch Yamaguchi													Guest	Recurring	Recurring	Recurring	Recurring	Recurring
Sophie One														Recurring	Recurring	Recurring	Recurring	Recurring
Other Sophie														Recurring	Recurring	Recurring	Recurring	Recurring
Bo Hweemuth														Recurring	Recurring	Recurring	Recurring	Recurring
Stanley Peet														Recurring	Recurring	Recurring	Recurring	Recurring

=== Main characters ===
- George Beard and Harold Hutchins – George Beard and Harold Hutchins are two fourth-grade pranksters who serve as the main protagonists of the series. Together, they start a comic book company called "Treehouse Comix, Inc.", and create the Captain Underpants comics at the center of the novels. They both attend Jerome Horwitz Elementary School in Piqua, Ohio, named for Curly of the Three Stooges. In Captain Underpants: The First Epic Movie, they are voiced by Kevin Hart and Thomas Middleditch respectively; in the animated series The Epic Tales of Captain Underpants, they are respectively voiced by Ramone Hamilton and Jay Gragnani.
- Mr. Benjamin "Benny" Krupp / Captain Underpants – Mr. Benjamin Krupp is the principal of Jerome Horwitz Elementary School and is the antagonist to George and Harold in the earlier books. Whenever he hears the sound of fingers snapping, he transforms into Captain Underpants, a superhero wearing white briefs and a red cape with black polka dots, reverting to his original self when water is poured on his head. From the third book, Captain Underpants and the Invasion of the Incredibly Naughty Cafeteria Ladies from Outer Space, onward, Captain Underpants acquires superhuman strength, durability, and flight after consuming "Extra-Strength Super Power Juice”, belonging to the evil aliens Zorx, Klax, and Jennifer. In the movie, he is voiced by Ed Helms, and in the animated series, by Nat Faxon.
- Melvin Richard Sneedly – Melvin Sneedly is a classmate of George and Harold who is characterized as a highly intelligent student and a frequent inventor. He functions as a recurring rival to George and Harold across the series and, in the eleventh book, Captain Underpants and the Tyrannical Retaliation of the Turbo Toilet 2000, briefly becomes a superhero known as Big Melvin. In the film, he is voiced by Jordan Peele and in the series by Jorge Diaz.
- Sulu and Crackers – Sulu is a bionic hamster adopted by George and Harold, and Crackers is a Quetzalcoatlus the boys bring back from a time-travel adventure; the pair later have children together, named Tony, Orlando, and Dawn.

=== Recurring ===
- Mr. Kenny Brian Meaner – Mr. Meaner is Jerome Horwitz Elementary School's gym teacher. He is depicted as being an overweight man and with a personality similar to Mr. Krupp's - cruel to students and often yelling at them. He appeared in the Netflix series, where he is voiced by David Koechner. In the TV series, he has an alternate ego by the name of Sargeant Boxers, which was made as a replacement for Captain Underpants in the first episode of the second season.
- Ms. Edith Anthrope – Ms. Edith Anthrope is the school secretary who is often shown to be in a bad mood. Like many of the other teachers at the school, she is unkind to the students. In the series, she is voiced by Patty Mattson.
- Mr. Morty Fyde – Mr. Fyde was the science teacher at Jerome Horwitz Elementary School. Chaotic events of the first three books lead to his eventual resignation from his job and he ultimately places himself in a mental institution. In the movie, however, Mr. Krupp simply fires Fyde because he'd rather spend time with his family instead of judge the school science fair. In the film, he is voiced by Mel Rodriguez and in the series he is voiced by Stephen Root.
- Ms. Tara Ribble – Ms. Ribble is the homeroom teacher of George and Harold's 4th-grade class. In book 5, she is hypnotized into becoming Wedgie Woman. She is voiced by Dee Dee Rescher in the movie and Laraine Newman in the TV series.
- Miss Singerbrains – Miss Singerbrains is the librarian at Jerome Horwitz Elementary School who banned all but one of the books in the library and eventually closed down the library.
- Mr. Riles Rected – Mr. Rected is the guidance counselor at Jerome Horwitz Elementary School. He is often seen hanging with Mr. Krupp, Mr. Meaner, Miss Anthrope, and Ms. Ribble. He is voiced by Brian Posehn in the film and Jorge Diaz in the animated series.
- Ms. Dayken – Ms. Dayken is a member of the teaching board at Jerome Horwitz Elementary school. She was also George and Harold's kindergarten teacher and she taught them about the planets, including "Uranus," which the boys found amusing. In the film, she is voiced by Susan Fitzer.
- The Lunch Ladies – The Lunch Ladies are the three women who run the cafeteria. They are notorious for inedible food. They quit in the third book when Mr. Krupp says he cannot punish George and Harold for their antics without proof.
- Doctor Diaper (known alternatively as Doctor Nappy in the UK) – Doctor Diaper is a diaper-clad mad scientist and the first villain Captain Underpants ever faced.
- The Talking Toilets – The Talking Toilets are an army of living toilets created by George and Harold, who were accidentally brought into the real world with a modified photocopier. All they could say is the phrase "Yum, yum, eat 'em up!"
- The Turbo Toilet 2000 – The Turbo Toilet 2000 is a giant toilet created by George and Harold, who was accidentally brought into the real world with a modified photocopier. After he was defeated by the Incredible Robo-Plunger, he and the other toilets were taken to Uranus where he remained for several books until being brought back to life by juice from the destroyed Robo-Plunger. In the film, it was now Melvin's invention that was grown by Poopypants with his size ray.
- The Incredible Robo-Plunger – A giant robot created by George and Harold to defeat the Turbo Toilet 2000. Afterwards, he repaired the school and took all the toilets to Uranus where he remained for several books until he was hit on the head by a kickball kicked into space by the Harold 2000. He is then rebuilt by the revived Turbo Toilet 2000 into a rocket scooter so the toilet could return to earth.
- Zorx, Klax, and Jennifer – Three space aliens who planned to invade Piqua, Ohio. They are the main antagonists of the third book. They disguised themselves as lunch ladies to turn the students of Jerome Horwitz Elementary School into Zombie Nerds by using Evil Zombie Nerd Juice.
- The Dandelion of Doom – A dandelion that absorbed alien super evil rapid-growth juice, causing it to grow into a giant monster.
- Tippy Tinkletrousers (formerly known as Professor Pippy Pee-Pee Poopypants, and in the film as Prof. Pee-Pee Diarrheastien Poopypants Esq.) – A scientist who comes from a foreign country where everyone has a silly name. In book 4, he forces everyone on earth to change their names into a silly one. After his defeat, Professor Poopypants changes his name, suggested by George rather than forcing everybody to change theirs. But Poopypants does not change his name to something normal, instead, he changes it to his grandfather's name Tippy Tinkletrousers. In the film, he is voiced by Nick Kroll.
- Wedgie Woman (Ms. Ribble) – A villain created by George and Harold who was based on their teacher Ms. Ribble. After a second mishap with the Hypno-Ring, it convinced her that she is Wedgie Woman. At first, she has no superpowers, but after her hairstyle gets splattered with superpower juice from the third book her hair transforms into arms and she gains super-intelligence.
- Robo-George and The Harold 2000 – Two giant robots built by Wedgie Woman based on George and Harold. They were fully obedient to Wedgie Woman; each had a vast arsenal of powerful weapons and gadgets and were programmed to destroy Captain Underpants once they heard him say "Tra-la-laaa!"
- The Bionic Booger Boy (Melvin Sneedly) – A fusion of Melvin Sneedly, boogers, and a super-powered robot. His growth is triggered by a field trip to a tissue factory.
- Carl, Trixie and Frankenbooger (The Three Robo-Boogers) – Boogers who all come from the Bionic Booger Boy. They all share a weakness to oranges, which Captain Underpants successfully used to destroy the rampaging trio of living mucus. Carl had the Bionic Booger Boy's legs, Trixie had the tentacles, and Frankenbooger had the arms. Whenever they ate, they became bigger and more evil.
- Evil George and Evil Harold – Alternative versions and negative counterparts of George and Harold from an alternate dimension who are both intelligent and evil. They are the main antagonists, along with Captain Blunderpants, of the 8th book in the series. They helped Captain Blunderpants and unlike the sketchy, amateurish George and Harold they are good authors and illustrators (ironically, the main George and Harold consider the alternative George and Harold's work inferior). Additionally, they also tended to change the signs into evil phrases (while their counterparts often change the signs into funny words).
- Captain Blunderpants – The opposite and evil counterpart of Captain Underpants from an alternate dimension, who has a toupee and looks and acts more like Krupp, while the alternate Krupp is nice. His transformation process is the opposite; when water is splashed on him, he becomes the evil Captain Blunderpants and when someone snaps their fingers, he becomes the nice Mr. Krupp.
- Kipper Krupp – A sixth-grade bully and Benjamin's nephew and Jasper Krupp's son, who would bully George, Harold, and other children when they were all in kindergarten. Due to a series of pranks that George and Harold conducted, he would eventually become nicer to the children along with his also mischievous friends Finkstein, Bugg, and Loogie.
- Sir Stinks-A-Lot (Mr. Meaner) – Mr. Meaner later becomes the alter ego of Sir Stinks-A-Lot, an evil hypnotist. While in prison, Meaner transforms into a blob of pure energy after eating an egg salad sandwich. He later removes Captain Underpants's superpowers and the effects of the Hypno-Ring.

== Reception ==
=== Controversy ===
In 2012, the American Library Association's Office for Intellectual Freedom reported that the Captain Underpants series was the single most-challenged title in the United States that year, and it repeated as the most-challenged title in 2013. The organization reported 464 formal, written complaints about library or school materials nationwide in 2012, an increase from 326 in 2011, which officials partly attributed to a new online reporting portal. Readers filing complaints cited "offensive language" and content "unsuited for age group" as the most common reasons for seeking to restrict the series. In response to the 2012 ranking, Pilkey said that he found it notable to appear on a list alongside authors such as Mark Twain, Harper Lee, and Maya Angelou but expressed concern that the designation could discourage parents from allowing their children to read the books.

In the Journal of LGBT Youth, children's-literature scholar Thomas Crisp analyzes the representation of Harold as gay as both notable and limited. In Captain Underpants and the Sensational Saga of Sir Stinks-A-Lot, the two protagonists travel 20 years into the future and encounter adult versions of themselves alongside their families. In that scene, the adult George is depicted with a wife and two children, while the adult Harold has a husband named Billy and twin adopted children, making Harold the only explicitly queer-identified character in the series. Crisp argues that Pilkey's depiction of Harold as gay is significant because the disclosure is written explicitly in the text rather than announced outside the books. At the same time, Crisp notes that the representation is minimal, and further observed that a teacher reading the book aloud could omit the single word "husband" and remove the queer content entirely without disrupting the narrative. In the fall of 2015, at least one Michigan elementary school removed the 12th book from a Scholastic book fair after parents objected to the same-sex marriage reference, a decision that generated national press coverage.

=== Views from educators and librarians ===
The Captain Underpants series has created sustained debate among teachers, librarians, and parents about its appropriateness for elementary-school audiences. In a 2008 commentary published in American Teacher, former high-school teacher Gary D. Askins argues that the books rely on bodily-function humor and depictions of disrespect toward adults. He questions whether schools should promote them as reading material for children aged seven to ten. In the same issue, school librarian Sara Kelly Johns defends the series as a tool for reaching reluctant readers, particularly boys, and quoted elementary librarians who praised Pilkey for embracing silliness as a route into reading for pleasure. An accompanying reader poll conducted by the publication reports that approximately 63% of respondents agreed that schools should promote the series, while 37% percent disagreed.

Individual teachers and librarians interviewed for that feature offered mixed views. A Chicago-area teacher describes any reading material that draws children in as a benefit, while a New Jersey teacher reiterates the appeal of the series to reluctant readers. A Texas school librarian took an opposing position, stating that she discouraged students from purchasing the books at school book fairs because she did not consider them to have literary value.

=== Scholarly and therapeutic commentary ===
Research in library and information science has situated Captain Underpants within broader conversations about boys' reading preferences. A 2006 study of 43 boys aged four to twelve, reviewed in Evidence Based Library and Information Practice in 2009, found that series books including Captain Underpants, Animorphs, Magic Tree House, and Redwall appeared frequently in the boys' personal collections and that humorous and illustrated formats were consistently valued by the participants. The review argues that these preferences are often undervalued by teachers and librarians and that recognizing them can help legitimize the reading practices of young male readers.

A 2024 case study published in Frontiers in Psychology describes the use of Captain Underpants in bibliotherapy with a fourth-grade child experiencing a learning disability. The therapist reports that while reading and discussing the series provided a vehicle for the child to engage with age-inappropriate humor, it served as a means to practice writing despite his reading difficulties.

=== Pilkey's response ===
In a 2011 interview published in Book Links, Pilkey addressed the frequent characterization of the series as a "boy's" book. He believes that label stems from adults's false perception, noting that he estimated roughly 40% of his fan mail came from girls. When asked about the recurring presence of the series on lists of challenged books, Pilkey said, ironically, that he attributed part of his commercial success to the publicity generated by efforts to restrict access to the books.

== Hiatus ==
Although the first few books came out regularly, the ninth book, Captain Underpants and the Terrifying Return of Tippy Tinkletrousers (advertised in a teaser at the end of the eighth book), was not released until 2012, after a six-year wait. During this time, Dav Pilkey was caring for his terminally ill father, who died in 2008. In 2009, he signed a deal with Scholastic for four new books, the first of which was The Adventures of Ook and Gluk: Kung-Fu Cavemen from the Future, released August 10, 2010. The second was Super Diaper Baby 2: The Invasion of the Potty Snatchers, released June 28, 2011. The third book, Captain Underpants and the Terrifying Return of Tippy Tinkletrousers, was released August 28, 2012. The fourth book, Captain Underpants and the Revolting Revenge of the Radioactive Robo-Boxers, was released January 15, 2013.

== Other media ==
=== Films ===
==== Feature film ====
On October 20, 2011, it was reported that DreamWorks Animation had acquired rights to make an animated feature film based on the Captain Underpants series. On October 25, 2013, it was reported that Rob Letterman would direct the film, while Nicholas Stoller would write the script. It would have been the second film to have Letterman and Stoller working together, the first being Gulliver's Travels. On January 21, 2014, the cast was announced, with Ed Helms joining as Mr. Krupp/Captain Underpants; Kevin Hart as George Beard; Thomas Middleditch as Harold Hutchins; Nick Kroll as the insidious villain, Professor Poopypants; and Jordan Peele as Melvin, the nerdy nemesis of George and Harold. On June 12, 2014, the film was scheduled for release on January 13, 2017. Following DreamWorks Animation's reorganization in early 2015, the studio announced that the film would be produced outside of the studio's pipeline at a significantly lower cost. It would be instead animated at Mikros Image in Montreal, Canada, and it would look differently than most of DWA's films. A month later, Deadline reported that Letterman had left the project, and that David Soren, the director of Turbo, was in talks to direct the film, but Letterman returned to the project and served as an executive producer with Dav Pilkey. The film was expected to be released on March 10, 2017, but in September 2015, DreamWorks Animation's The Boss Baby took over its date. The film was released on June 2, 2017.

==== Spin-off films ====
On December 9, 2020, it was announced that a feature film based on the Dog Man spin-off series is in development at DreamWorks Animation with Peter Hastings directing at the helm after his experience with Dav Pilkey's works from The Epic Tales of Captain Underpants. On October 6, 2023, the movie was confirmed to be released in 2025. On January 29, 2024, it was announced that the film would be released on January 31, 2025. A sequel is in development.

=== Television series ===
Dav Pilkey had looked to turn the books into a possible live-action TV series, and he had imagined Chris Farley in the titular role. Around the same year the first book debuted to the public, Farley died of a drug overdose. Defunct animation studio Soup2Nuts also attempted to produce an animated series based on the books in the early 2000s.

DreamWorks Animation Television produced a television series based on (and a sequel to) the film that was streamed to Netflix. It was released on July 13, 2018.

=== Shorts and specials ===
- The Heartbreaking Havoc of the Haunting Hack-A-Ween (2019)
- The Interactive Insanity of the Irritating Interlopers (2020)
- The Xtreme Xploits of the Xplosive Xmas (2020)
