= Captain Underpants and the Sensational Saga of Sir Stinks-A-Lot =

Book by Dav Pilkey

- Author: Dav Pilkey
- Illustrator: Dav Pilkey
- Language: English
- Series: Captain Underpants series
- Genre: Children's, humor, comic science fiction
- Publisher: Blue Sky (US), Scholastic (US)
- Publication date: August 25, 2015 (black and white); April 5, 2022 (full color)
- Publication place: United States
- Media type: Print (hardcover)
- Pages: 208
- ISBN: 0545504929
- Preceded by: Captain Underpants and the Tyrannical Retaliation of the Turbo Toilet 2000
- Followed by: Dog Man

Captain Underpants and the Sensational Saga of Sir Stinks-A-Lot is the twelfth and final book in the Captain Underpants series, written and illustrated by Dav Pilkey. The book continues after the eleventh book as George, Harold, and their clones switch places, only to find their gym teacher Mr. Meaner has become Sir Stinks-A-Lot, who turns his students into slaves. The boys team up with their adult counterparts to save the world.

== Plot ==
A few weeks after the events of the previous book, on a planet called "Smart Earth", a scientist gets the idea of mixing three "smart" ingredients; "Smart" Diet Coke, "Smart" Mentos and "Smart" Pop Rocks. This causes the planet to explode, with one chunk landing at Piqua Valley Home. Gym teacher Mr. Meaner eats a chunk, and the other teachers follow him as he escapes using his intelligence. Yesterday, George and Harold visited his office, where he sprays them with a strange substance that turns them into robot-like slaves. The other teachers are amazed by their behavior, though George and Harold are not, and they become ill from stress due to excessive homework. They see a commercial for the “Rid-O-Kid 2000” and disguise themselves as adults, making the children do silly things "for" the teachers. The teachers call in Mr. Meaner and enraged at what he sees, he gets out his Stinky Kong 2000, now a mech suit.

Deciding to seek help from adults they can trust, George and Harold go to their parents, only to find that they know they’ve changed and prefer it that way. Feeling heartbroken, they go to Melvin’s house to find his Robo-Squid, then travel forward in time to find their older selves, now famous graphic novel writers, and their families. The older and younger versions of George and Harold travel back in time to find Mr. Krupp. The older George and Harold tried to snap their fingers, but as he had been washing his face, he was unable to turn into Captain Underpants, allowing Mr. Meaner to find and beat them to a pulp. Once Mr. Krupp dries his face, they snap their fingers, turning him into Captain Underpants, defeating Mr. Meaner, and sending him to prison.

After eating an egg salad sandwich with pickle relish, Meaner turns into an enormous blob called Sir Stinks-A-Lot. Underpants returns to fight him back, but when Old George and Harold are captured and absorbed, Stinks-A-Lot discovers Captain Underpants' weakness and turns him into a powerless Krupp. Old George and Harold telepathically call for Sulu and Crackers' children, who feed him a combination of Diet Coke, Mentos, and Pop Rocks, causing him to explode. Everyone, including Mr. Meaner (who has returned to normal), survived the explosion. As young George and Harold return their older counterparts to the future, they find that Krupp no longer turns into Captain Underpants at the snap of a finger. With covers over them, they decide to travel back to find and rescue Crackers and Sulu. Back home, the Yesterdays wake to find that Dawn, Orlando, Tony, and their present counterparts have vanished. Yesterday, George decided that he and Harold should make a comic featuring Dog Man, thus concluding the Captain Underpants series.

== Reception ==
Captain Underpants and the Sensational Saga of Sir Stinks-A-Lot revealed the co-protagonist, Harold, to be gay. LGBTQ+ news reporter Steven Frank, from Logo News, commended the unostentatious nature of the book's gay representation, deeming the move a "big step forward for kid's lit."

The parent-teacher organization of Arborwood Elementary School in Monroe, Michigan refused to include the book at their book fair. Superintendent Barry Martin stated that, since children typically attend the fair unaccompanied by parents, "we felt it was necessary that if this book was going to be purchased, the parent needed to be involved in that.”

== Adaptations ==
Elements of the novel were adapted to the second and third seasons of the animated series The Epic Tales of Captain Underpants.

- Mr. Meaner's role as a super-smart villain would be loosely adapted in the second season episode "The Bombastic Blathering of Brainy Blabulous", where Mr. Meaner is turned into "Brainy Blabulous".
- Harold's sexuality would be referenced in the third season episode "The Monstrous Mayhem of the Massive Melviathan", where Harold notes the "Moose-cle Men" who appear in the episode's shared dreamscape to have been from a "weird dream" of his.
