= The Spooky Tale of Captain Underpants: Hack-a-Ween =

2019 animated Halloween special

The Spooky Tale of Captain Underpants: The Horrifyingly Haunted Hack-a-Ween (commonly referred to as Hack-a-Ween or Captain Underpants: Hack-a-Ween) is a 2019 American animated Halloween special and season spin-off episode of the Netflix series The Epic Tales of Captain Underpants. The series is based on the children's book franchise Captain Underpants by Dav Pilkey. The special was released on October 8, 2019.

== Plot ==
George Beard and Harold Hutchins love Halloween, which is sharply contrasted by their principal, Mr. Krupp. and a fellow student, Melvin Sneedly. Krupp and Melvin launch a Hall-no-Ween campaign, seeking to outlaw the holiday. They hold a town council meeting and successfully convince all the parents to make Halloween illegal.

In retaliation, George and Harold create Hack-a-Ween, describing it as a "legally safe alternative". This alternative replaces costumes with "disguises" and trick-or-treating with "sneak-or-snacking". To win over the adults, they talk to the owner of their favourite Halloween store, Hallo-Warehouse, and get him to create a haunted house.

However, Melvin, wanting to stop the event, turns three ordinary inflatables into real creatures. Although George and Harold reconcile with Melvin, the danger is unleashed. Their only solution is to turn their principal into the superhero Captain Underpants to fight the inflatables. After winning the battle, the three children go sneak-or-snacking together.

== Release ==
Hack-a-Ween premiered on Netflix on October 8, 2019, and later received a tie-in book adaptation published by Scholastic on July 7, 2020.

== Reception ==
A review at Common Sense Media stated: "The kids have little respect for adults, who rarely attempt to exert any control over them anyway. This chaotic story is an OK pick for kids, but adults may tire of its relentless pace." John Serba from Decider also indicated that adult audience might find the film of little interest, viewing the special as overall mediocre, although fun and lighthearted.
