= Captain Underpants: The First Epic Movie (soundtrack) =

2017 soundtrack albums

Music for the 2017 DreamWorks Animation film Captain Underpants: The First Epic Movie, based on the children's novel series Captain Underpants by Dav Pilkey, was found on two albums. The first album, titled Captain Underpants: The First Epic Movie (Original Motion Picture Soundtrack) was released on June 2, 2017, through Virgin Records and Deep Well Records. The album is produced by Adam Anders and Peer Åström, and featured contributions from Andy Grammer, Adam Lambert, Nathan Willett from Cold War Kids, as well as the voice cast members from the film. An original theme song was written and performed by "Weird Al" Yankovic. The second album, titled Captain Underpants: The First Epic Movie (Original Motion Picture Score) featured original score composed by Theodore Shapiro, and was released through Back Lot Music on June 9, 2017.

== Captain Underpants: The First Epic Movie (Original Motion Picture Soundtrack) ==
Captain Underpants: The First Epic Movie (Original Motion Picture Soundtrack)

Soundtrack album by various artists
- Released: June 2, 2017
- Studios: Elbo Studios, Glendale, California; RFT Studios, Calabasas, California
- Genres: Film soundtrack; children's music
- Length: 32:42
- Labels: Virgin; Deep Well
- Producers: Adam Anders; Peer Åström

Singles from Captain Underpants: The First Epic Movie (Original Motion Picture Soundtrack)
- 1. "Captain Underpants Theme Song" Released: May 12. 2017

Adam Anders and Peer Åström composed and produced the original songs and soundtrack for the film. "Weird Al" Yankovic wrote and performed the film's original theme song, which was released in a lyric video on May 12, 2017. Andy Grammer wrote another original song for the film, titled "A Friend Like You". The film also features music from Adam Lambert, Cold War Kids member Nathan Willett, and Lil Yachty. An 11-track soundtrack album was released digitally on June 2, 2017, by Virgin Records and Deep Well Records.

=== Track listing ===
No.	Title	Artist	Length
1.	"Captain Underpants Theme Song"	"Weird Al" Yankovic (Note: featuring audio footage by Ed Helms)	2:14
2.	"A Friend Like You"	Andy Grammer	3:40
3.	"Saturday (cast version)"	Kevin Hart and Thomas Middleditch	0:48
4.	"Think"	Adam Lambert	2:59
5.	"1812 Ofarture"	The Students of Jerome Horwitz Elementary School	1:08
6.	"Hallelujah"	Kevin Hart, Thomas Middleditch, Ed Helms	0:39
7.	"Oh Yeah"	Lil Yachty (Note: Samples the Yello song of the same name)	2:51
8.	"Saturday"	Nathan Willett	3:29
9.	"Comic Book Opening"	Theodore Shapiro	1:54
10.	"Saving the Day"	Theodore Shapiro	7:22
11.	"The Prank for Good"	Theodore Shapiro	5:38
Total length:			32:42

=== Reception ===
Stacey Nguyen of PopSugar stated "Captain Underpants: The First Epic Movie's soundtrack is perfect for whenever you're in a goofy and lighthearted mood." Michael Rechtshaffen of The Hollywood Reporter stated "Keeping in the goofy groove is the soundtrack, which includes a suitably anthemic "Weird Al" Yankovic-performed theme song and energetic covers of Aretha Franklin's "Think" and Yello's "Oh Yeah," by Adam Lambert and Lil Yachty, respectively." John Archer of Forbes said "the soundtrack isn't a brilliant Dolby Atmos showcase".

=== Personnel ===
- Music producers – Adam Anders, Peer Astrom
- Album producer – Adam Anders
- Instruments programming – Peer Astrom
- Additional instruments programming – Mike Babcock, Sebastian Zuleta
- Additional vocal recording – Tighe Sheldon
- Vocal arrangements – Adam Anders
- Additional vocal arrangements – Tim Davis
- Vocal engineers and producers – Adam Anders, Alex Anders
- Assistant vocal engineer – Fredrik Jansson
- Additional vocal engineering – Stefan Persson, Thomas "Tillie" Mann
- Backing vocals – Adam Anders, Luke Edgemon, Nikki Anders, Nikki Leonti, Ryan Edgar, Susan Fitzer, Tiffany Palmer, Tim Davis
- Vocal contractor – Tim Davis
- Album mastering – Fredrik Jansson
- Design – Sydney Nichols
- A&R – Ryan Del Vecchio
- Music business affairs for Deep Well Records – Joshua Kamzan
- Music business affairs for Universal Pictures – Tanya Perara, Terra Hatch
- Executive in charge of music for Deep Well Records – Kim Nieva
- Executive in charge of music for Universal Pictures – Mike Knobloch
- Marketing manager – Sam Breslin
- Music supervision for Universal Pictures – Angela Leus
- Music production supervisor – Anthony Falcon
- Assistant music production supervisor – Ashley Maietta, John Talley

=== Chart performance ===
Chart (2017)	Peak position
US Top Soundtracks (Billboard)	22

=== Accolades ===
Award	Category	Recipient(s)	Result
Hollywood Music in Media Awards 2017	Best Original Song - Animated Film	"Captain Underpants Theme Song" for "Weird Al" Yankovic	Nominated

== Captain Underpants: The First Epic Movie (Original Motion Picture Score) ==
Captain Underpants: The First Epic Movie (Original Motion Picture Score)

Film score by Theodore Shapiro
- Released: June 9, 2017
- Studios: Abbey Road Studios, London
- Genre: Film score
- Length: 55:42
- Label: Back Lot Music
- Producer: Theodore Shapiro

Theodore Shapiro chronology
Snatched (2017)	Captain Underpants: The First Epic Movie (Original Motion Picture Score) (2017)	A Simple Favor (2018)

The film score was composed by Theodore Shapiro, which was recorded at the Abbey Road Studios in London. A soundtrack for the score of the film was released on June 9 via Back Lot Music. (Note: In 2016, NBCUniversal acquired DreamWorks Animation which resulted in two of the film scores for The Boss Baby and Captain Underpants: The First Epic Movie released through Back Lot Music, which was a division of Universal Filmed Entertainment Group; however, both the films were still distributed by 20th Century Fox which had the rights until 2017.) It features 24 pieces of music, and an exclusive digital booklet on iTunes. Three of the scores are also available on the soundtrack (those being "Comic Book Opening", "Saving the Day", and "The Prank for Good").

=== Track listing ===
All tracks are written by Theodore Shapiro.

No.	Title	Length
1.	"Comic Book Opening"	1:56
2.	"Treehouse"	1:02
3.	"Bromance Origin Story"	1:57
4.	"Annihilate the Friendship"	2:12
5.	"Tuna Casserole"	0:59
6.	"Snooping"	1:46
7.	"Power of the Hypno Ring"	1:57
8.	"A Hero is Born"	4:14
9.	"Mad Genius Inventor"	0:53
10.	"Bringing Krupp Home"	2:19
11.	"Two Blue Eyes"	2:09
12.	"Brain of a Child"	1:54
13.	"Hallelujah, His Name is Poopypants"	1:36
14.	"The Nobel Prize"	3:01
15.	"Anti-Humor Boy"	1:48
16.	"Art Class Liberation"	1:56
17.	"Carnival Conniptions"	2:16
18.	"Separation Anxiety"	1:32
19.	"Poopypants Has No Gas"	1:35
20.	"A World Without Laughter"	2:53
21.	"Flip-O-Rama!"	1:24
22.	"Really Silly Names"	1:22
23.	"Saving the Day"	7:23
24.	"The Prank for Good"	5:38
Total length:		55:42

=== Reception ===
Jonathan Broxton of Movie Music UK wrote, "Theodore Shapiro's use of enormous orchestral forces, his multitude of themes, the depth and intricacy of his orchestrations, and the creative way he brings everything together is something that should be celebrated simply for existing in 2017. Best of all is the fact that there is just so much joy in this music, so much innocent exuberance, it's impossible not to be taken in by it's [sic] infectious good humor and obvious love of the genre it is spoofing." Filmtracks wrote, "Shapiro has provided incredibly intelligent parody music in small doses through the years, but Captain Underpants: The First Epic Movie is a culmination of all those efforts. Still, since he didn't play the parody mode with straight seriousness, opting for an abundance of cheap humor and cartoonish diversions, the score can be headache-inducing for some listeners. The album situation is also not ideal, the songs and score really needing to be provided on one product (which was possible given their lengths) due to the close relations between the two. This is not music that you will be able to forget even if you tried, the catchiness factor so overwhelming that it's not recommended that you play it for your kids, because they'll be singing it for months after just one listen. That might be acceptable if they've been trained to wash the shit stains out of their own underwear."

=== Accolades ===
Award	Category	Recipient(s)	Result
Annie Award	Music in an Animated Feature Production	Theodore Shapiro	Nominated
Hollywood Music in Media Awards 2017	Best Original Score - Animated Film	Theodore Shapiro	Nominated
International Film Music Critics Association	Best Original Score - Animated Film	Theodore Shapiro	Won
