= Captain Underpants and the Big, Bad Battle of the Bionic Booger Boy =

Book by Dav Pilkey

Captain Underpants and the Big, Bad Battle of the Bionic Booger Boy (Parts 1 & 2)
- Part 1 cover
- Author: Dav Pilkey
- Illustrator: Dav Pilkey
- Language: English
- Series: Captain Underpants series
- Genre: Children's novel, Humor, Science fiction
- Publisher: Blue Sky (US), Scholastic (US)
- Publication date: Original release: August 1, 2003 (part 1); September 30, 2003 (part 2); Full color edition: August 28, 2018 (part 1); December 26, 2018 (part 2)
- Publication place: United States
- Media type: Print (Paperback)
- Preceded by: Captain Underpants and the Wrath of the Wicked Wedgie Woman
- Followed by: Captain Underpants and the Preposterous Plight of the Purple Potty People

Captain Underpants and the Big, Bad Battle of the Bionic Booger Boy are the sixth and seventh books in the Captain Underpants series by Dav Pilkey. The first part was published on August 1, 2003, and the second part was published on September 30, 2003. The books feature the debut of George and Harold's new pets Sulu (a hamster with a bionic endoskeleton) and Crackers (a Quetzalcoatlus) who first appeared in the first and second parts respectively. The second part also features the debut of time travel in the series, which would become a core theme of the series later on.

== Plot summary ==
=== Part 1: The Night of the Nasty Nostril Nuggets ===
On demonstration speech day, George and Harold show off the "Squishy," two ketchup packets hidden under a toilet seat. Melvin forces everyone to watch his demonstration, the "Combine-o-Tron 2000", which he uses his hamster Sulu and a robotic hamster body he built to show off, and orders Sulu to do some tricks for the class, but the hamster's able to spank Melvin himself. After noticing the scene, George and Harold adopt Sulu, who happily joins the two. Meanwhile, Ms. Ribble uses a Squishy on an already grumpy Mr. Krupp, who believes that George and Harold are responsible. When Mr. Krupp finds them in the lunchroom, Melvin almost immediately tattles on the boys, and Mr. Krupp sends them to detention, causing them to make a libelous Captain Underpants comic starring Melvin.

Having read the comic, Melvin angrily goes home and, using the Combine-O-Tron, builds a super-powered robot to combine with himself. However, Melvin sneezes at the last second from his allergy to cats and gets combined with the robot and boogers, turning him into the Bionic Booger Boy. While dismayed at first, he enjoys being like this for a while, even acquiring his own drinking fountain. The cold and flu season begins; when the class visits a tissue factory, the owner, Snoddy, offers free tissues, but Melvin becomes gigantic as a natural defense. George turns Mr. Krupp into Captain Underpants, and the man saves his secretary, Miss Edith Anthrope. Her wet kisses turn him back, and Melvin devours him, but Sulu defeats Melvin using large novelty items from warehouses.

George's suggestion, reversing the batteries in the Combine-o-Tron, surprisingly works, and only three robotic booger globs fly off. However, Mr. Krupp and Melvin begin acting strangely: Mr. Krupp brags about the Combine-O-Tron saving the city, and Melvin threatens the boys with detention. Suddenly, the globs come to life and smash the Combine-O-Tron.

=== Part 2: The Revenge of the Ridiculous Robo-Boogers ===
The globs start chasing George, Harold, Sulu, Melvin, and Mr. Krupp. They reach a dead end, but Sulu spits them out into outer space. After a number of incidents, George and Harold discover the body mix-up. Krupp in Melvin's body is called Kruppy the Kid, and Melvin in Krupp's body is Mr. Melvin. Since it would take Melvin six months to build another machine, George suggests going back in time, which makes Mr. Melvin snap his fingers, causing Kruppy the Kid to turn into Captain Underpants and fly away. George and Harold are forced to tell the secret, and Melvin orders them to create a comic about him, telling them to give him a cool name and not to make him look stupid, before setting out to build. The next day, Melvin is furious that George and Harold's comic is not what he asked for (they claim to have thought he said to give him a stupid name and to not make him look cool), but soon explains to them that if the machine's used two days in a row, something will place the world in a catastrophe. He also gives them the "Forgetchamacallit 2000", a machine to erase one's short-term memory, as well as a decoy Combine-O-Tron 2000. George and Harold decide to travel two days into the past to get to Melvin's Combine-O-Tron 2000. They succeed, but the librarian, Miss Singerbrains, steals the machines and takes them to the police station.

However, the boys end up in the Cretaceous period and get a Quetzalcoatlus, whom they name "Crackers". The two go to when Singerbrains is driving to the police station. George convinces her she is dreaming because of "the dinosaur's presence", etc. Harold sends Crackers back, then they erase her memory, get the Combine-O-Tron, and travel to the present. Meanwhile, Captain Underpants is helping two old ladies cross the street. He successfully rescues a cat from a tree at the same time, but accidentally leaves the ladies up there. Then he costs the Purple Dragon Sing-A-Long friends their big game by mistaking their football for a UFO. They, and other victims of his (including Anthrope), form an angry mob. Melvin finds Captain Underpants and switches them back.

In space, the boogers land on a spaceship, hang on as it returns to Earth, and then start destroying the space center. Captain Underpants goes off to help but discovers that Melvin has taken his powers, who refuses to help unless George and Harold change the comic. Captain Underpants and the boys are cornered at a local store and start throwing random items stacked outside. By chance, Carl is killed upon swallowing an orange. The other boogers become cautious, but Captain Underpants makes a deliberately annoying "Underpants Dance", making them climb up his chosen building, right into a well-placed orange-juice Squishy.

Soon, Melvin, under the name Big Melvin, lies to the Eyewitness News crew (including spanking Captain Underpants) while George and Harold sneak back to school, returning with the machines. Captain Underpants gets his powers back, and then the crew's and the audience's memories are erased. The angry mob finds Melvin (who no longer has superpowers) and chases him in retribution. When the boys return to their clubhouse, George learns that Harold didn't actually send Crackers back and had left her with Sulu. However, George decides that she can stay in the present for just one night, but she'll have to return the next day. But the next day, when George, Harold, and Sulu are ready to take Crackers back where she belongs, the Purple Potty time machine malfunctions.
