= Captain Underpants and the Tyrannical Retaliation of the Turbo Toilet 2000 =

Book by Dav Pilkey

- Author: Dav Pilkey
- Illustrator: Dav Pilkey
- Language: English
- Series: Captain Underpants series
- Genre: Children's novel
- Publisher: Blue Sky (US), Scholastic (US)
- Publication date: August 26, 2014 (black and white); March 23, 2021 (full color)
- Publication place: United States
- Media type: Print (Hardcover, Paperback)
- Pages: 224
- ISBN: 0545504902
- Preceded by: Captain Underpants and the Revolting Revenge of the Radioactive Robo-Boxers
- Followed by: Captain Underpants and the Sensational Saga of Sir Stinks-A-Lot

Captain Underpants and the Tyrannical Retaliation of the Turbo Toilet 2000 is a novel written by Dav Pilkey and the eleventh (and penultimate) book in the Captain Underpants series. It was published on August 26, 2014.

== Plot ==
The kickball from the fifth book reaches Uranus and revives the Turbo Toilet 2000, who builds a rocket scooter from the Robo-Plunger's body. In the original universe, he disrupts one of Melvin's experiments and soon chases him until Melvin finds one of Mr. Krupp's clipped-off toenails and extracts it into DNA. He ends up defeating the Turbo Toilet 2000, but soon people start interrupting his experiments over trivial matters. After a year, Melvin finds Sulu's signal in the future and uses the Robo-Squid suit to take George and Harold back home before warning them of what's to come.

After turning Captain Underpants back in at Mr. Krupp's, the boys try to nap but find out they missed a full school day, and their parents force them to do five hours of yard work. George then realizes they have a test tomorrow, but in the morning, they fall asleep in their tree house, resulting in all zeroes. To make matters worse, Mr. Krupp gleefully reveals that this was actually "Super Secret Test Day" and that the final grades are already calculated; while George barely gets a passing grade, allowing him to move on to the fifth grade, Harold fails, causing him to repeat the fourth grade, and separating the two boys in school, much to the glee of the teachers.

George convinces Harold to travel back with the suit, but they now have duplicates from that point, whom George switches off for them every other day. The next morning at school, they are caught by Miss Anthrope, whom George tries to convince is dreaming, but she sends them to the office. Yesterday, George and Harold had gone to the office, only to realize she had seen two versions of the boys. Fully convinced she is dreaming, she strips naked. The Yesterday versions warn the boys to stay away from school, but the original boys pull pranks that make all the school's teachers go crazy. When Mr. Krupp sees all the teachers naked, and the two Georges and Harolds, he is speechless, and starts repeatedly saying "B-b-bubba bobba hob-hobba-hobba Wah-wah" like when he almost married Ms. Ribble. The police eventually come, and one of the teachers pants one of the officers, causing all the teachers to be arrested for indecent exposure, reckless endangerment, and pantsing the police officer, while Mr. Krupp is sent to an insane asylum.

Two weeks having passed, the Turbo Toilet 2000 flies down to Earth, while George and Harold, disguised as Talking Toilets, convince the Turbo Toilet 2000 to break down the asylum wall. Over the intercom, George snaps his fingers, turning Mr. Krupp into Captain Underpants, who fights the Turbo Toilet 2000 and wins, but the Turbo Toilet 2000's giant tears of pain fall on his head. Mr. Krupp directs the Turbo Toilet 2000 to George and Harold's treehouse, but the Turbo Toilet 2000 swallows him whole. While shaking the treehouse to get the Yesterday George and Harolds out, Crackers' eggs get cracked on the floor. The Yesterdays discover they are pterodactyl-hamsters, who smash the Turbo Toilet 2000 while rescuing the Yesterdays. Mr. Krupp is arrested as a "dreaming" loon. As the four boys regroup, George points out all the loose ends in the story, which cause them to realize they will have to go through one last sequel, much to their dismay.
