= Captain Underpants and the Terrifying Return of Tippy Tinkletrousers =

Book by Dav Pilkey

- Author: Dav Pilkey
- Illustrator: Dav Pilkey
- Language: English
- Series: Captain Underpants series
- Genre: Children's novel, comic science fiction
- Publication date: August 28, 2012 (black and white); December 10, 2019 (full color)
- Publication place: United States
- Media type: Print (hardback)
- Pages: 304
- ISBN: 9780545175340
- Preceded by: Captain Underpants and the Preposterous Plight of the Purple Potty People
- Followed by: Captain Underpants and the Revolting Revenge of the Radioactive Robo-Boxers

Captain Underpants and the Terrifying Return of Tippy Tinkletrousers is a 2012 American children's novel and the ninth book in the Captain Underpants series by Dav Pilkey. It was published on August 28, 2012, six years after the publication of the previous book. Tippy Tinkletrousers is actually Professor Poopypants, from Captain Underpants and the Perilous Plot of Professor Poopypants as revealed in the previous book. (Captain Underpants and the Preposterous Plight of the Purple Potty People) This book explains how Tippy Tinkletrousers arrived at the end of the eighth book, as well as a prequel story of George and Harold in kindergarten explaining how their friendship began and setting the page for their life before Captain Underpants.

== Plot ==
In the last book, just before George and Harold get arrested, Tippy Tinkletrousers appears in a time machine/pants robot, and freezes the two cops about to arrest them with a freeze ray built into the robot called the Freezy-Beam 4000. But Tippy was not supposed to be there and freeze the two cops, and he interrupted what was supposed to happen. What was supposed to happen was that George and Harold were arrested for the crimes that their evil counterparts committed, and the two (and Krupp) are imprisoned.

At the Piqua State Penitentiary, Tippy is asked to build a statue (secretly a robot suit) of Warden Gordon Bordon Schmorden, the chief jailer of the prison. On the day Tippy presents his robot suit, he freezes everyone in his way, then takes Krupp to find the boys for Tippy. George and Harold snap their fingers, bringing Captain Underpants to life, and soon, while trying to freeze him, Tippy accidentally freezes his robotic legs. Even though Captain Underpants successfully pulls off the top half of the robo-suit, Tippy escapes by going back in time exactly five years ago.

Five years ago, five-and-three-quarters-year-old George and his parents moved in from Michigan, and George was forced by his mother to wear a tie as a good first impression. On his way to school, he notices six-year-old Harold being attacked by Kipper, Bugg, Loogie, and Finkstein (the former being Krupp’s nephew) with the mean owner of the nearby gas station, Billy Bill, egging them on. Angered at this, George plays a smart prank on Billy Bill by changing his gas station's sign from "Free Brake Inspection" to "Free Bra Inspection", by removing 'k' and 'e' from the sign, prompting a group of infuriated and offended women to attack the latter. George then saves Harold, and the two become best friends. Mr. Krupp arrives and sends the two to detention for "bullying Kipper". To pass the time, the two create their first comic, titled 'The Adventures of Dog Man'.

George and Harold study Kipper for a week and then later switches his padlock for one of their own locks, and replace his stolen lunch money with girly things like friendship bracelets, dresses, dolls and Susie Sunshine bracelet kits while sending strange texts to Kipper's goons, all while placing a note from "Wedgie Magee" with it. However, Kipper eventually catches on to the setup and the next day he and his gang steal the pizzas that George and Harold bought from Piqua Pizza Palace for the kindergartners as a way to torture them even further.

Infuriated, the two friends devise another major prank against the bullies in retaliation. First, they fill the four bullies' lockers with shaving cream to pass it off as ectoplasm. While this initially works, Principal Krupp points out that the "ectoplasm" was obviously sprayed through the vents in the doors.

Enraged and tired of the anonymous pranks, Kipper and his three goons begin torturing the kindergarteners for answers, even stealing more pizzas and then charging money for leftovers. To retaliate, George and Harold order another batch of 4 pizzas with each of them having double ghost chili peppers (Piqua Pizza Palace's hottest chili peppers) which cause the bullies' tongues to spice up completely, resulting in them getting sent to the nurse's office, holding an ice pack to their mouths. George and Harold eventually create a comic that tells the fictional tale of Wedgie Magee and the signs of his curse, all of which match their pranks. After Kipper and his gang "see" that ghost (George on stilts, wearing a giant pair of pants), they run outside in terror, during a severe thunderstorm and power outage.

In the original timeline, the four bullies apologize for their deeds, compensate the kindergarteners, and never bully anyone ever again. Satisfied, George and Harold call off the curse. Unfortunately, Tippy arrives in the past at exactly the same time Kipper's gang runs outside. Upon seeing Tippy's robot, the four bullies are driven insane with fear as it closely resembles the ghost of Wedgie Magee.

Kipper and his friends are sent to an insane asylum, and Principal Krupp is accused of causing the four boys' insanity. Although no charges were pressed, everyone blames him anyway, which eventually results in the permanent loss of his job. Tippy then time-travels four years into the future. However, because Mr. Krupp was hypnotized into becoming Captain Underpants when George and Harold were in 4th grade, a paradox arises: a universe is created in which Captain Underpants never existed.

Tippy returns to the present, only to find out all that remains of Earth is a flaming and devastated wasteland, dominated by dead talking toilets and giant evil zombie nerds. Tippy realizes that he has to go back again and save Earth. However, before Tippy can do so, he is immediately presumably crushed by George and Harold, who are now giant zombie nerds (from the Rapid Evil Growth Juice). What remains of Tippy is a red, squishy stain that appears to be blood. (Note: In the subsequent book, it is revealed that what looks like blood is actually a giant novelty ketchup packet.)

== Reception ==
Reception for the book was mostly positive, with Kidsreads.com praising the entry. Booklist gave a positive review, writing that it would have a definite appeal to kids. Kirkus Reviews gave an ambivalent review, stating that the book's jokes were typical but that there were signs that the "creative wells are running dry at last".

== See also ==
- Captain Underpants and the Preposterous Plight of the Purple Potty People
- Captain Underpants and the Revolting Revenge of the Radioactive Robo-Boxers
