= The Epic Tales of Captain Underpants: Mega Blissmas =

"The Xtreme Xploits of the Xplosive Xmas"
- The Epic Tales of Captain Underpants episode
- Written by: Television
- Original air date: December 4, 2020
- Running time: 46 minutes

Episode chronology
← Previous "The Aggravated Assault of the Alien Armada"	Next → —

Captain Underpants: Mega Blissmas, titled onscreen as The Xtreme Xploits of the Xplosive Xmas is a 2020 American animated Christmas special of the animated series The Epic Tales of Captain Underpants, as well as the 46th and final episode of the series overall. It was released worldwide on Netflix on December 4, 2020. The special follows George Beard and Harold Hutchins as they attempt to reinvent Christmas by traveling back in time to alter their holiday traditions, resulting in a chaotic alternate future ruled by hyperactive elves, villainous reindeer, and an aggressively muscular Santa Claus known as "Jacked Santa".

== Plot ==
George and Harold grow tired of what they see as stale and predictable Christmas traditions. After creating a list of improvements—dubbed "Mega Blissmas"—the boys use a time machine to introduce their ideas into the past. Their changes snowball into a drastically altered version of Christmas in the present day, where elves enforce holiday cheer with heavy-handed enthusiasm and Santa has transformed into the fearsome and overconfident Jacked Santa.

Realizing they have accidentally broken the true spirit of the holiday, George and Harold team up with Captain Underpants to restore the original timeline. The trio must evade hostile reindeer, survive the elves’ relentless “joy patrols,” and ultimately remind Santa that generosity, compassion, and kindness are the core of Christmas. After resetting the timeline, George and Harold discover that while traditions evolve, the meaning behind them remains constant.

== Cast ==
- Nat Faxon as Captain Underpants / Mr. Krupp
- Ramone Hamilton as George Beard
- Jay Gragnani as Harold Hutchins
- Sean Astin as Narrator
- Dayci Brookshire as Jessica Gordon
- Jorge Diaz as Melvin Sneedly
- Jim Cummings as Santa Claus / Jacked Santa

== Release ==
The special premiered on Netflix on December 4, 2020, as part of DreamWorks Animation Television's holiday programming.

== Reception ==
Mega Blissmas received mixed-to-positive responses from viewers. Critics highlighted the special's energetic humor, exaggerated holiday world-building, and focus on themes of empathy and gratitude. Some reviewers noted that the special's frenetic pacing and slapstick humor may overwhelm younger audiences, while others praised its message about understanding the value of giving over receiving.
