= Dog Man (film) =

2025 DreamWorks Animation film

- Theatrical release poster
- Directed by: Peter Hastings
- Screenplay by: Peter Hastings
- Based on: Dog Man by Dav Pilkey
- Produced by: Karen Foster
- Starring: Pete Davidson; Lil Rel Howery; Isla Fisher; Lucas Hopkins Calderon; Ricky Gervais
- Cinematography: Scott Cullen
- Edited by: Hoppy Hopkins
- Music by: Tom Howe
- Production company: DreamWorks Animation
- Distributed by: Universal Pictures
- Release dates: January 15, 2025 (Festival de l'Alpe d'Huez); January 31, 2025 (United States)
- Running time: 89 minutes
- Country: United States
- Language: English
- Budget: $40 million
- Box office: $146.1 million

Dog Man (Note: Billed as DreamWorks Dog Man) is a 2025 American animated superhero comedy film produced by DreamWorks Animation and based on the children's graphic novel series by Dav Pilkey. A spin-off to Captain Underpants: The First Epic Movie (2017), the film was written and directed by Peter Hastings, and stars the voices of Pete Davidson, Lil Rel Howery, Isla Fisher, Lucas Hopkins Calderon, and Ricky Gervais, with Hastings providing vocal effects for Dog Man. The film follows the title character as he defends Ohkay City from Petey, a supervillain cat who inadvertently becomes the father of an infant clone, and later on, Petey joins forces with Dog Man and the others to defeat Flippy the Fish, a cybernetic butterflyfish with telekinesis.

DreamWorks Animation announced a film adaptation of Dog Man in December 2020, with Hastings set to write and direct after his experience with Pilkey's works from The Epic Tales of Captain Underpants (2018–2020). Karen Foster joined as a producer in January 2024, and the cast was announced that September.

Dog Man premiered at the 2025 Festival de l'Alpe d'Huez in Alpe d'Huez, France on January 15, 2025, and was theatrically released in the United States on January 31 by Universal Pictures. The film received generally positive reviews from critics and grossed $146.1 million worldwide on a $40 million budget. A sequel is in development.

== Plot ==
A villainous orange cat named Petey constantly terrorizes Ohkay City, with one of his schemes involving planting a bomb to destroy an abandoned warehouse. Famed cop Officer Knight and his dog Greg chase Petey down until they reach the warehouse to defuse the bomb, but Knight cuts the wrong wire and it explodes, killing Knight by head injury and paralyzing Greg's body. The surgeons save Greg by transplanting his head onto Knight's body, renaming him Dog Man. Dog Man inherits Knight's job and quickly becomes beloved for his repeated arrests of Petey who fired his assistant Butler. However, Petey's constant escapes angers the mayor, and she forces the Chief of Police to take Dog Man off the Petey case. Dog Man becomes lonely and depressed due to the loss of Knight and the abandonment of his girlfriend Alice, who sells their house. He takes a tennis ball he used to play with as his only memory of his former life and moves into a doghouse on the city outskirts.

Petey decides to clone himself to create an assistant just like him. However, the machine he purchases creates a newborn copy of him with no interest in evildoing, whom he calls Li'l Petey. Petey steals the corpse of an evil telekinetic fish named Flippy and plans to use Living Spray to resurrect him and defeat Dog Man, but Li'l Petey interferes. Petey decides to abandon him in a cardboard box in the middle of the city, where Dog Man finds and adopts him. The two begin to bond as they spend time together in Dog Man's home.

At his lair, Petey discovers a picture book drawn by Li'l Petey depicting both of them as a family, making him feel guilty for abandoning him. Learning from his former assistant that Li'l Petey was adopted by Dog Man, Petey uses his orb-shaped mech, 80-HD, to retrieve him. Upon realizing that Li'l Petey is missing, Dog Man, news reporter Sarah Hatoff, and her cameraman Seamus search for Li'l Petey to no avail. Meanwhile, Petey reveals to Li'l Petey that his abusive father abandoned him as a child. In an attempt to cheer him up, Li'l Petey uses 80-HD to bring Petey's father, called Grampa by Li'l Petey, to his lair. Grampa immediately starts berating Petey, revealing that he has not changed despite Li'l Petey's hopes.

Flippy is resurrected at the Living Spray factory after being mishandled by the factory employees, which also causes the factory itself to come to life. Having been reprogrammed by Petey to destroy all do-gooders, he targets Dog Man and his friends, before Flippy's programming makes him switch to kidnapping Li'l Petey. A remorseful Petey reluctantly teams up with Dog Man, Li'l Petey, and their friends fight an army of buildings affected by the Living Spray. Petey swaps out Li'l Petey inside 80-HD with himself. Realizing that his reviver is redeemed, Flippy decides to drop Petey into an active volcano to kill him, but Li'l Petey arrives and after Flippy explains his story, he shows him a comic book depicting them as friends, making him cry, redeeming him, and disabling his telekinetic powers, dropping Petey above the volcano. Dog Man uses his beloved tennis ball to knock Petey from falling in the lava, losing the ball in the process, and Flippy is arrested.

Petey is pardoned by the mayor, but refusing to be considered a do-gooder, he and Li'l Petey return to their lair to find that Grampa took everything except for Li'l Petey's books. After a talk with him, Petey decides to share custody of his son with Dog Man, and gives him a new ball. One of the living buildings returns to Dog Man's home and has a party with Dog Man and his friends.

== Voice cast ==
- Peter Hastings as:
  - Dog Man/Greg, a Golden Retriever whose head is transplanted onto his owner Officer Knight's body following an accident. Keeping in line with the source material, Dog Man does not speak, although Hastings still provides his barks and expressions.
  - Officer Knight, Dog Man's police officer owner whose body is given to Greg to become Dog Man following his death.
  - Harold Hutchins' House, a house brought to life by the living spray
- Pete Davidson as Petey, a quick-witted and arrogant orange cat who is Dog Man's rival and the self-proclaimed "world's most evilest cat" until he redeems himself
- Lil Rel Howery as Chief, the irritable yet supportive police chief of the station Dog Man works at
- Isla Fisher as Sarah Hatoff, a news reporter
- Billy Boyd as Seamus, Sarah's cameraman
- Lucas Hopkins Calderon as Li'l Petey, a kind-hearted kitten clone of Petey and Dog Man's sidekick
- Ricky Gervais as Flippy the Fish, a cybernetic butterflyfish with telekinesis until Li'l Petey redeems him
- Stephen Root as Grampa, an elderly and grumpy orange cat who is Petey's neglectful father and Li'l Petey's grandfather
- Poppy Liu as Butler, a Zoomer-style girl who is Petey's former assistant
- Cheri Oteri as the Mayor of Ohkay City, who frequently berates Chief and Dog Man's police work
- Melissa Villaseñor as the realtor who sells Officer Knight's house
- Kate Micucci as Dippy, an unintelligent woman whom Petey tries to sell Li'l Petey to

George Beard and Harold Hutchins, the in-universe creators of Dog Man and Captain Underpants, make a brief appearance, with Kelly Stables providing the voice of the latter, who was previously voiced by Thomas Middleditch in Captain Underpants: The First Epic Movie.

== Production ==
On December 9, 2020, DreamWorks Animation (DWA) announced that a film based on the Captain Underpants spin-off graphic novel series Dog Man was in development, with Peter Hastings attached to write and direct after his experience with Dav Pilkey's works from The Epic Tales of Captain Underpants (2018–20). On January 29, 2024, following the release date announcement, DreamWorks announced that Karen Foster would serve as producer. On September 17, 2024, with the release of the first trailer, Pete Davidson, Lil Rel Howery, Isla Fisher, Poppy Liu, Stephen Root, Billy Boyd, and Ricky Gervais were revealed to be part of the film's voice cast.

Pilkey approved of the film on the condition that Hastings directed, originally wanting the film to be animated in stop motion. Instead, the film is a combination of traditional animation and computer animation. Unlike Captain Underpants: The First Epic Movie (2017)—which was animated by Mikros Image and Technicolor Animation Productions—the film's animation is handled by Jellyfish Pictures, who previously did the animation for DreamWorks' How to Train Your Dragon: Homecoming (2019) and Spirit Untamed (2021), along with marketing custom animation for Trolls World Tour (2020) and providing additional production assets for The Boss Baby: Family Business (2021), The Bad Guys (2022), and Kung Fu Panda 4 (2024). Nate Wragg was the production designer.

On October 6, 2023, the film was confirmed to be released in 2025, while it was also confirmed that Dog Man and Gabby's Dollhouse: The Movie would be animated entirely at partner studios (excluding Sony Pictures Imageworks who was named as the animation partner for The Bad Guys 2).

== Music ==
The album features an original score composed by Tom Howe and was released through Back Lot Music on January 31, 2025.

== Marketing ==
In May 2024, Jakks Pacific and its costume division Disguise entered into a partnership with Dav Pilkey to make merchandise based on the Dog Man film along with the comic book series. A book featuring the art of the film was released on December 10, 2024, published by Abrams Books. Universal's marketing campaign for the film began in September 2024 with a trailer on YouTube that accumulated 102 million views. Theatrical trailers were paired with screenings of Transformers One, The Wild Robot, Moana 2, and Sonic the Hedgehog 3. Television advertisements targeted families during the holidays (Thanksgiving and Christmas) during airings of the National Dog Show, holiday specials, New Year's Eve programming, show premieres and finales, and major sports events. The push extended to Amazon devices, Hulu, Peacock, and Hallmark. On January 20, Dog Man was integrated into the Food Network's Kids Baking Championship, with a film-themed baking challenge, sets, and custom animation. Social media analytics firm RelishMix reported that online marketing led to 246.6 million interactions across social media platforms, attracting both fans of the graphic novels and newcomers intrigued by the animation style.

== Release ==
=== Theatrical ===
Dog Man had its world premiere during the 2025 edition of the Festival de l'Alpe d'Huez in Alpe d'Huez, France, on January 15, 2025, and was released theatrically in the United States on January 31. On January 24, 2025, a week before release, DreamWorks announced that the short film Little Lies and Alibis, a short connected to DWA's film The Bad Guys, would run before Dog Man in theaters; the film also serves as a promotional feature for DWA's following film, The Bad Guys 2, which released on August 1.

=== Home media ===
Dog Man was made available for purchase and rent on digital streaming services on February 18, 2025. The film was released on April 1 on DVD and Blu-ray. As part of a long-term deal with Netflix for Universal's animated films, the film began streaming on Peacock on May 30, 2025 and will move to Netflix for the next ten months, starting on September 30, before returning to Peacock for the remaining four.

== Reception ==
=== Box office ===
Dog Man grossed $98 million in the United States and Canada, and $48.1 million in other territories for a worldwide total of $146.1 million.

In the United States and Canada, Dog Man was released alongside Companion and Valiant One and was projected to gross $20–30 million from 3,800 theaters in its opening weekend, with some estimates going as high as $40 million. It made $10.8 million on its first day, including an estimated $1.36 million from Thursday night previews. It debuted to $36 million, topping the box office. The opening was the second biggest for animated films released in January after DreamWorks Animation's Kung Fu Panda 3 (2016; $41.8 million) and the third consecutive box office-topping debut for DreamWorks after Kung Fu Panda 4 and The Wild Robot (both 2024). Exit polling indicated that 45% of attendees saw the film because it looked "fun" and "entertaining" and a third bought tickets because they were fans of the IP. Men accounted for 52% of the opening weekend audience, with those under 35 comprising 70% and premium large format screens contributing 22%. During Super Bowl weekend, in which movies in the United States regularly perform below average, the film grossed $13.8 million, dropping a bigger-than-expected 61.6% while remaining atop the box office. During its four-day third weekend, it made $13.4 million and finished in third place. Dog Man dropped out of the box office top ten in its ninth weekend.

=== Critical response ===
On the review aggregator website Rotten Tomatoes, 82% of 105 critics' reviews are positive, with an average rating of 6.7/10. The website's consensus reads: "Realizing Dav Pilkey's canine creation with a frenzied energy that never lets up, Dog Man will delight kids while throwing their parents a bone." Metacritic, which uses a weighted average, assigned the film a score of 66 out of 100, based on 22 critics, indicating "generally favorable" reviews. Audiences surveyed by CinemaScore gave the film an average grade of "A" on an A+ to F scale.

=== Accolades ===
Award	Date of ceremony	Category	Recipient(s)	Result	Ref.
Nickelodeon Kids' Choice Awards	June 21, 2025	Favorite Animated Movie	Dog Man	Nominated	
Hollywood Music in Media Awards	November 19, 2025	Best Original Score in an Animated Film	Tom Howe	Won	
Annie Awards	February 21, 2026	Best Voice Acting - Feature	Lil Rey Howery	Nominated	
