= Captain Underpants and the Wrath of the Wicked Wedgie Woman =

Book by Dav Pilkey

- First edition cover
- Author: Dav Pilkey
- Illustrator: Dav Pilkey
- Language: English
- Series: Captain Underpants series
- Genre: Children's novel; Humor; Science fiction
- Publisher: Blue Sky (US), Scholastic (US)
- Publication date: August 29, 2001 (black-and-white), December 26, 2017 (color edition)
- Publication place: United States
- Media type: Print (Paperback)
- Preceded by: Captain Underpants and the Perilous Plot of Professor Poopypants
- Followed by: Captain Underpants and the Big, Bad Battle of the Bionic Booger Boy Part 1: The Night of the Nasty Nostril Nuggets

Captain Underpants and the Wrath of the Wicked Wedgie Woman is the fifth book in the Captain Underpants series by Dav Pilkey. It was published on August 29, 2001. It features the reformation of George and Harold's formerly cruel teacher, Ms. Ribble, at the end using the 3-D Hypno Ring (which was used to hypnotize Mr. Krupp, causing him to become Captain Underpants in the first book) through reverse psychology, because the ring causes females to do the opposite of what the bearers of the ring force them to do.

== Plot ==
Ms. Ribble announces that she is going to retire at the end of the school year and forces everyone to make happy retirement cards for her, while George and Harold make a Captain Underpants comic with her as "The Wicked Wedgie Woman" instead, and the boys pass out the "Friday Memo" with several humorous changes. They later convince Mr. Krupp to sign a blank card, but after learning about their comic, he puts them in detention. Harold defiantly refuses to give Ms. Ribble the card, while Mr. Krupp seizes it; Harold makes it look like a marriage proposal. Mr. Krupp remains indifferent to the chaotic school week ahead. At the wedding, just before they get married, Ms. Ribble breaks up with Mr. Krupp because he has a funny-looking nose (ironically, they both have the same nose shape). Mr. Krupp is furious and explains the boys' trick, and Ms. Ribble tries to attack the boys, but they manage to escape.

To get back at them, Ms. Ribble has dropped their B's and C's to F's and G's, making them redo the fourth grade. Harold reluctantly agrees to let George hypnotize her, then a local newscast interrupts by revealing that the police are shutting down the company that made the Hypno-Rings because they are now considered dangerous. Additionally, when used on women, a mental blunder causes them to do the opposite of what the bearer tells them to do. The boys, unaware of the newscast, tell Ms. Ribble that she will turn their grades back to normal and not become Wedgie Woman. That night, she arrives at George’s treehouse as the Wicked Wedgie Woman, but accidentally spills super-power juice into her hair, which forms several tiny hands. She kidnaps the boys and takes them to her house, where she builds robot copies of them. When Mr. Krupp snaps at Harold 2000 after he kicks a ball into space, he turns himself into Captain Underpants and asks the robots for help, but their Spray Starch defeats him. Meanwhile, the Wicked Wedgie Woman ties the boys to adjacent chairs with a candle and a hatchet, but the hatchet simply cuts through the ropes.

George and Harold find the wedgied Captain Underpants, convinced that he lost his powers. They make a comic about Captain Underpants' origin, which he reads, says the words on the back, and defeats the robots. As Captain Underpants and The Wicked Wedgie Woman face off, George shouts to Harold that he'll get rid of his extra-strength starch, and she steals all the bottles and sprays them at Captain Underpants. Because of the counterfeit hair remover, everyone is bald, and the boys hypnotize Ms. Ribble into forgetting the last two weeks and becoming the nicest teacher in the school's history. George adds chocolate chips to her students' cookies every day, and Harold is not amused.

== Reception ==
Kirkus Reviews wrote, "As in the previous four episodes, neither the pace nor the funky humor [...] lets up for a moment. Pilkey is still having entirely too much fun with this popular series, which continues to careen along with nary a whiff of staleness." Publishers Weekly agreed that the novel is filled with "waistband-expanding comedy".

Booklist also reviewed the novel.
