= Captain Underpants and the Perilous Plot of Professor Poopypants =

Book by Dav Pilkey

- Author: Dav Pilkey
- Illustrator: Dav Pilkey
- Language: English
- Series: Captain Underpants series
- Genre: Children's novel
- Publisher: Blue Sky (US), Scholastic (US)
- Publication date: February 1, 2000 (black-and-white), December 29, 2015 (color edition)
- Publication place: United States
- Media type: Print (Paperback)
- Pages: 160
- Preceded by: Captain Underpants and the Invasion of the Incredibly Naughty Cafeteria Ladies from Outer Space (and the Subsequent Assault of the Equally Evil Lunchroom Zombie Nerds)
- Followed by: Captain Underpants and the Wrath of the Wicked Wedgie Woman

Captain Underpants and the Perilous Plot of Professor Poopypants is the fourth book in the Captain Underpants series written by Dav Pilkey, published in 2000. The book is about a mad scientist named Professor Pippy P. Poopypants becoming a new science teacher at Jerome Horwitz Elementary. However, all the students laugh at his name.

== Plot ==
A scientist from the fictional country of New Swissland, named Professor Pippy P. Poopypants, goes to the United States to demonstrate how his Shrinky-Pig and Goosy-Grow inventions can help the world, but everyone laughs at Poopypants' name instead of taking him seriously.

Meanwhile, Jerome Horwitz Elementary School is going to a restaurant-arcade called The Piqua Pizza Palace, but when George and Harold rearrange the lunch sign, Mr. Krupp demands that they clean the teachers' lounge, costing them their chance to go to the Piqua Pizza Palace with everyone else. However, the boys get their revenge by messing around in the teachers' lounge, and after the field trip, the teachers are largely covered in glue and foam pellets. They chase the boys around the school, and after seeing the teachers looking like abominable snowmen, Mr. Fyde resigns, thinking he's going insane. This forces Mr. Krupp to place an ad in the paper seeking a replacement. When Professor Poopypants sees it, he applies for the job, thinking children to be kind and sweet-hearted, but only gets them interested by building a robot that makes gerbils jog along with them. Some time later, Ms. Ribble reads the Pied Piper of Hamelin, which inspires George and Harold to make a comic about the Professor trying to take over the world, which destroys the last of Professor Poopypants' sanity, after he reads a copy that a student left lying around.

He makes the gerbil machine as large as a tall building, then shrinks the school and holds them hostage to turn their names sillier, with a system of three alphabetical name charts based on the first/last letter of each part of a first and last name. George and Harold (now "Fluffy" and "Cheeseball" respectively) get Captain Underpants (now "Buttercup Chickenfanny", but refuses to take the order to change names) to steal Professor Poopypants' enlarging machine, but he and the machine are shrunk in the process. The two of them try to restore the school to its normal size, but get kicked out. Harold makes a paper airplane that George enlarges, and after many dangers, Underpants rescues them. George enlarges Underpants to the gerbil's size, then he defeats Professor Poopypants, and everyone's names revert. The boys use the machines to restore the school and Captain Underpants to their normal size. Captain Underpants is soaked, turning him back into Mr. Krupp. Professor Poopypants is hauled off, and, at George and Harold's urging, he changes his name to his grandfather's, Tippy Tinkletrousers, which makes the prisoners and police officers ridicule him even more, much to his anger.

== Reception ==
The Booklist described Captain Underpants and the Perilous Plot of Professor Poopypants as "Silly, gross-out fun for Captain's legion of fans". Similarly, a review in School Library Journal said, "With its bathroom humor, madcap pranks, gross adventures, mini-comic strips, and flip-book pages, this rollicking laugh-out-loud cartoon story is certain to be a hit, especially with reluctant readers."

== Sequel ==
The book following this was "Captain Underpants and the Wrath of the Wicked Wedgie Woman," released in 2001.

== See also ==
- Dav Pilkey
- Captain Underpants
- Captain Underpants: The First Epic Movie, the Captain Underpants movie, with a plot similar to the book
