= The Epic Tales of Captain Underpants =

American animated comedy television series

- Season 1 promotional poster
- Also known as: The Epic Tales of Captain Underpants: Camp (season 3); The Epic Tales of Captain Underpants in Space! (season 4)
- Genre: Action comedy Family
- Created by: Dav Pilkey
- Based on: Captain Underpants by Dav Pilkey Captain Underpants: The First Epic Movie by David Soren
- Developed by: Peter Hastings; Mark Banker
- Voices of: Nat Faxon; Ramone Hamilton; Jay Gragnani; Jorge Diaz; Peter Hastings
- Narrated by: Sean Astin
- Theme music composer: Peter Hastings
- Composers: Jared Faber; Fred Kron
- Country of origin: United States
- Original language: English
- No. of seasons: 4
- No. of episodes: 45 (plus 3 specials) (list of episodes)

Production
- Executive producer: Peter Hastings
- Running time: 21 minutes
- Production companies: DreamWorks Animation Television; Scholastic Entertainment

Original release
- Network: Netflix
- Release: July 13, 2018 – December 4, 2020

The Epic Tales of Captain Underpants is an American animated television series produced by DreamWorks Animation Television. Developed for television by Peter Hastings and Mark Banker, it is a standalone sequel to the 2017 feature film Captain Underpants: The First Epic Movie, based on the Captain Underpants book series by the show’s creator, Dav Pilkey.

The show's first season was released on Netflix on July 13, 2018, its second season releasing on February 8, 2019, its third season, Camp, releasing on July 19, 2019, and its fourth season, The Epic Tales of Captain Underpants in Space!, releasing on July 10, 2020. In 2023, Hastings confirmed that no further seasons were planned, but a Dog Man movie was in development.

On January 9, 2026, the entire series was removed from Netflix following the end of its deal with DreamWorks, moving the series to Peacock the same day.

== Premise ==
=== Season 1 ===
The series revolves around the adventures of George Beard and Harold Hutchins, two best friends who are devoted pranksters and aspiring comic book artists. The two attend Jerome Horwitz Elementary School, overseen by the strict principal Mr. Krupp. As a side-effect of having once been hypnotized by George and Harold, (Note: As depicted in Captain Underpants: The First Epic Movie) Krupp turns into their comic book character Captain Underpants whenever he hears the sound of fingers snapping. Conversely, Captain Underpants turns back into Krupp after water gets in his face. Both personalities remain ignorant of the other.

Most episodes deal with a threat to the school brought about by an ordinary person, often a teacher, being turned into a monster depicted in George and Harold's comics through intentionally contrived coincidences.

=== Season 2 ===
A cyborg future version of George and Harold's nemesis Melvin takes over the school and replaces Mr. Krupp so he can get his younger self into Eliteanati Academy.

=== Camp ===
The third season involves George and Harold heading to a summer camp, with them having to deal with Mr. Krupp being the camp instructor and the eventful hijinx of the camp owned by the Federation of United National Camps (AKA the F.U.N.C.).

=== In Outer Space! ===
The fourth season involves George and Harold being recruited for a mysterious mission in outer space, but by the second episode, Melvin gets captured by Biglyans (a large space alien species).

== Episodes ==
Season	Episodes	Originally released	
Season	Episodes	First released	Last released
1	13	July 13, 2018	
2	13	February 8, 2019	
Camp	13	July 19, 2019	
Specials	3	October 8, 2019	December 4, 2020
In Space!	6	July 10, 2020	

== Cast ==
=== Main ===
- Nat Faxon as Benjamin "Benny" Krupp/Captain Underpants
- Ramone Hamilton as George Beard
- Jay Gragnani as Harold Hutchins
- Sean Astin as Narrator
- Peter Hastings as Comic Narrator
- Jorge Diaz as Melvin Sneedly, Stanley Peet, Mr. Rected, and Melvinborg
- Erica Luttrell as Erica Wang

=== Supporting ===
- David Koechner as Mr. Meaner
- Laraine Newman as Ms. Ribble
- Patty Mattson as Ms. Anthrope
- Dayci Brookshire as Jessica Gordon, Dressy Killman, Penelope Brown-Hoggard and additional teachers.
- Grace Dumbaar as Sophie One
- Evan Kishiyama as Steve "Gooch" Yamaguchi
- Brennan Murray as Bo Hweemuth
- Trevor Devall as Smartsy Fartsy and new Smartsy Fartsy (who was eaten by Smartsy)
- Nolan North as Lee Dingman, Cash Networth, Jet Wingman, Yule, and Dr. Shifty Fitzgibbons
- Secunda Wood as Moxie Swaggerman and Haily Comett
- Gavin C Robinson as Mr. Hand
- Tress MacNeille as Ms. Hurd
- Kevin Michael Richardson as Diddlysaurus, Dr. Diaper, Turbo Toilet 2000, Zorx, Klax, Jennifer, Professor Poopypants, The Schoozer, and Fingers
- Stephen Root as Morty Fyde and Avacadwoe
- Mindy Sterling as Cindy Sneedly
- Clancy Brown as Toilette Ree and Splotch
- Phil LaMarr as Mr. Cleveland
- Maggie Wheeler as Ms. Yewh, TP Mummy, and Lunch Lady
- Tudi Roche as Bernice Krupp
- Stephen Tobolowsky as Creeply Rattlechains
- Fred Tatasciore as Furculees, Chief Hairococha, Keithicus, Rippedicus, and Guardicus
- Rob Riggle as Theodore "Ted Turdsly" Murdsly
- Dawn Wells as Gumbalina Toothington
- Steve-O as Lane Junkston
- Jim Rash as Mr. Jerry Citizen
- Lewis Black as Ragely J. Snarlingtooth
- Toby Huss as Caesar and Cruelius Sneezer
- John DiMaggio as Smelly Socktopus
- Gary Anthony Williams as Dupe Licitous
- Paul Rugg as Vert Ladderfeller III, Altitooth, and Bivocac Ladderfeller
- Maurice LaMarche as Tubbadump
- Max Koch as Laserlightmare and Hank
- Jim Cummings as Santa Claus/Jacked Santa
- Eric Bauza as Robius and Rap Talkwell
- Kari Wahlgren as Mayor Hoppy McChapper

== Production ==
In April 2000, Dav Pilkey sought to adapt Captain Underpants into a possible television series, having imagined Chris Farley in the titular role prior to his death. Soup2Nuts would subsequently attempt to produce an animated series based on the books later that decade. On December 12, 2017, Netflix and DreamWorks Animation Television announced that there would be an animated series to follow up the feature film adaptation of the book series, Captain Underpants: The First Epic Movie, entitled The Epic Tales of Captain Underpants. Originally titled "Captain Underpants and the Epic Tales of George and Harold", it premiered on the streaming service on July 13, 2018, and was executive-produced by Peter Hastings. A second season, which contains thirteen episodes, was announced and to be released on February 8, 2019. The third season, which contains another thirteen episodes, was announced to be released on July 19, 2019. A fourth season, which contains six episodes, was announced to be released on July 10, 2020.

In October 2019, Netflix released a 46-minute Halloween special of the series titled The Spooky Tale of Captain Underpants: Hack-a-Ween. In February 2020, an interactive special titled Captain Underpants: Epic Choice O' Rama was released. In December 2020, a 46-minute Christmas special titled Captain Underpants: Mega Blissmas was released. In 2023, co-showrunner Peter Hastings confirmed that no further seasons were planned, with the next installment in the franchise being the 2025 feature film Dog Man.

== Release ==
The series was first released on Netflix on July 13, 2018. The second season was released on February 8, 2019, and the third season was released on July 19, 2019. The series also aired in the UK on CITV.
