= Cat Kid Comic Club: The Musical =

- Music: Brad Alexander
- Lyrics: Kevin Del Aguila
- Book: Kevin Del Aguila
- Basis: Cat Kid Comic Club by Dav Pilkey
- Premiere: July 21, 2023: Lucille Lortel Theatre, New York City.

Cat Kid Comic Club: The Musical is a 2023 superhero comedy musical based on the Dog Man spinoff series Cat Kid Comic Club graphic novels by writer Dav Pilkey. It was created by TheatreWorksUSA.

== History ==
After the success of Dog Man: The Musical, the team, led by composer Brad Alexander and lyricist/book-writer Kevin Del Aguila, decided to adapt its spin-off series for the stage.

Cat Kid Comic Club was developed as an Off-Broadway show, that first aired in the summer of 2023, by nonprofit TheatreWorksUSA. Its premiere was at the Lucille Lortel Theatre, set from July 21st to August 27th. Many of the members of the Dog Man: The Musical cast originated roles in this premiere.

== Synopsis ==
The musical follows the events of books from both the Cat Kid Comic Club and Dog Man series, including Dog Man: Fetch 22 and the first book of Cat Kid Comic Club. Rather than tell one linear story, most of the songs describe events that happen within comics written by the characters.

The opening of the musical shows Molly Pollywog and 21 mind-controlled psychokinetic tadpoles turned evil using their powers to 'destroy the city and stuff', as Sarah Hatoff reports that this very well could be "The End" of the world. Li'l Petey, as his superhero identity Cat Kid, treats Molly and the tadpoles with compassion, and invites to join "The Cat Kid Comic Club", where he can teach them to express themselves by creating their own comics. Flippy, a bionic fish who was once turned evil through mind control, sees himself in the tadpoles, and decides to adopt all of them. The tadpoles grow into frogs, but two of them – Melvin and Naomi – argue throughout.

The first comic, written by Melvin, is about a toothbrush who wishes to be a lawyer for dinosaurs, and goes to 'lawyer school' and builds a time machine to go back 67 million years and defend an iguanodon teenager falsely accused of eating a baby ("Dennis the Toothbrush Lawyer for Dinosaurs"). Naomi says she thinks Melvin's idea was dumb, and Flippy sends her to time-out rock.

The second comic follows an aptly named "Supa Fail" who tries to be helpful by bringing back a restaurant-owner his stolen toothpick, and accidentally destroys the entire world instead. Frog Poppy writes of "The Cute, Little, Fluffy Cloud of Death" who is bullied by the sun for being creepy, but befriends a ghost girl and her skelopup, who all ignore the sun until he goes away. The next comic tells the tale of "Chubbs McSpiderbutt", who gets bitten by Jake the Spider, causing spider legs to grow from his butt, which he decides to use for good. Chubbs and Jake, as his sidekick, encounter the evil members of the not very nice club – Dr. Pasty McSprinkles and Scott the Worm – but we are left on a cliffhanger as to how the story ends.

Flippy, having read all of these comics, believes that the comics are too full of potty humour, creepy characters, or cartoon violence, deeming them awful, which makes the frogs upset. He laments about being the "Worst Dad Ever". Meanwhile, Naomi and Melvin get into a musical argument, which devolves from petty insults into Naomi criticising Melvin for not standing up for her when she was treated differently for being a girl. Melvin runs away, exclaiming about a new comic idea, and Naomi is annoyed by his sudden departure ("All About You").

Another frog, Starla, is interested in poetry, so writes a haiku about nature which she turns into a comic ("Birds, Flowers, Trees"). Melvin reveals his new comic is called "My Sister, Naomi", and retells the incident where she was mistreated and lets her stand up and speak for herself. Everyone celebrates their getting along and sings and dances at "The Mega-Gigantic, Humonga-Normous Comic Club Party!"

== Musical numbers ==
- "The End" – Sarah Hatoff, Flippy, Cat Kid, Molly, Company
- "The Cat Kid Comic Club" – Cat Kid, Flippy, Melvin, Naomi, Company
- "Dennis the Toothbrush Lawyer for Dinosaurs" – Dennis, Dino, Company
- "Supa Fail!" – Supa Fail, Supa Fail's Mother, Company
- "The Cute, Little, Fluffy Cloud of Death" – Poppy, Company
- "Chubbs McSpiderbutt" – Chubbs, Jake, Dr. Pasty McSprinkles, Scott, Company
- "Worst Dad Ever" – Flippy, Company
- "All About You" – Melvin, Naomi
- "Birds, Flowers, Trees" – Starla, Company
- "My Sister, Naomi" – Melvin, Naomi, Carnival Barker, Company
- "The Mega-Gigantic, Humonga-Normous Comic Club Party!" – Company
- "Bows" – Orchestra

== Characters and original cast ==
Character(s)	Original Off-Broadway Production (2023)
Li'l Petey/Cat Kid, Molly Pollywog, Scott the Worm	Sonia Roman
Sarah Hatoff, Jake the Spider, Poppy, Starla	L.R. Davidson
Flippy, Dino, Dr. Pasty McSprinkles	Jamie LaVerdiere
Dennis, Carnival Barker, Chubbs McSpiderbutt	Brian Owen
Melvin the Frog, Supa Fail	Dan Rosales
Naomi, Supa Fail's Mother	Markia Nicole Smith
Ensemble/Understudy	Jeremy Fuentes
Ensemble/Understudy	Malynne Smith

== Reception ==
In a review of the show from The New York Times, Laurel Graber claims it "emphasizes the value of learning about diverse points of view and encouraging creativity in young people" and praising its set, puppets, writing, and hilarious acting.
