= Phoebe Kreutz =

American singer

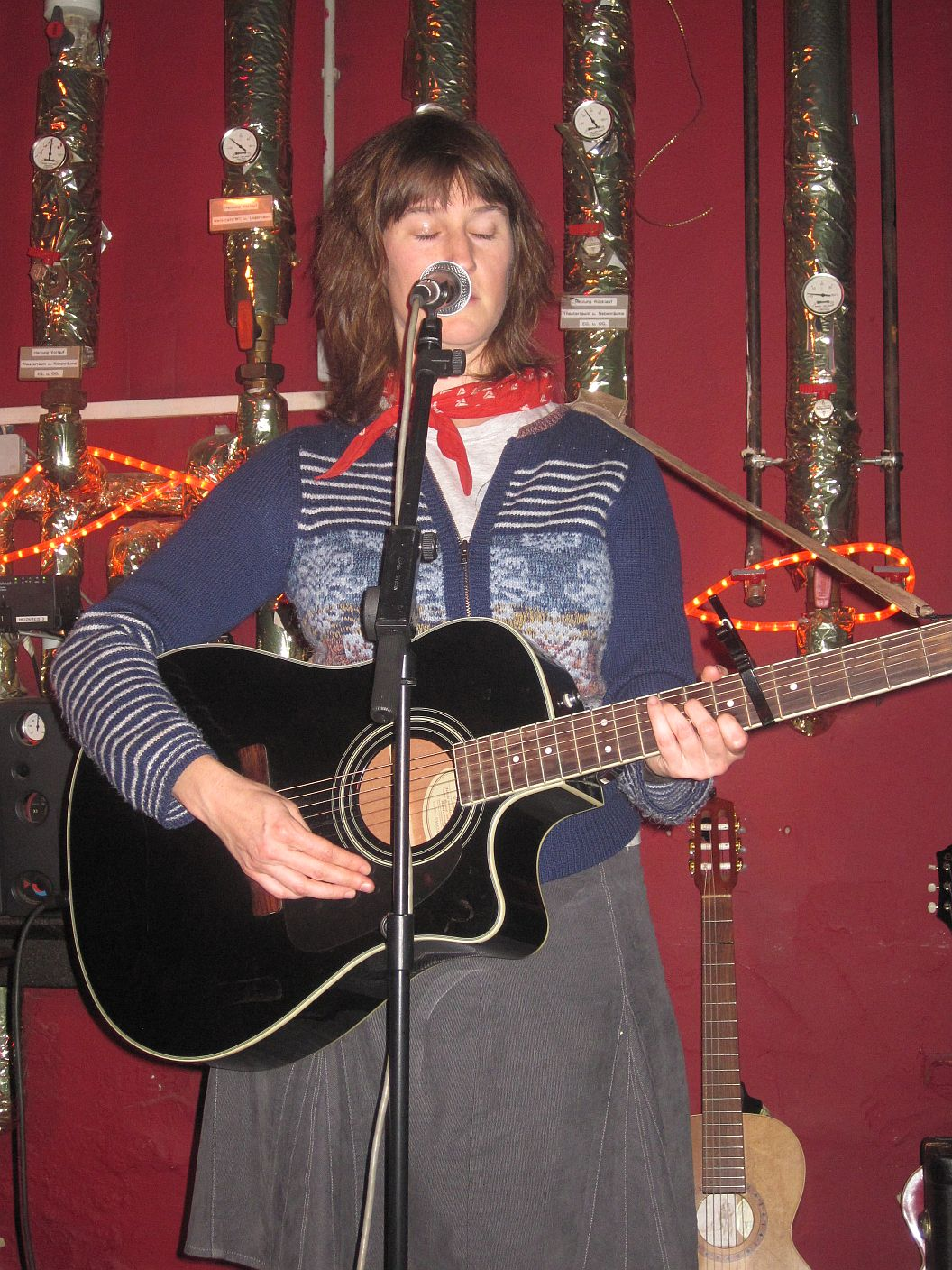
- Phoebe Kreutz in 2012

Background information
- Origin: New York City
- Genres: Rock, anti-folk
- Instruments: Vocals, guitar
- Years active: 2003–present
- Website: phoebekreutz.com

Phoebe Kreutz is a singer-songwriter, primarily associated with the anti-folk scene of New York City, but also known for her theater and television work.

Kreutz has been performing live since the early 2000s, and has released five independent albums, Pretty. Pretty Stupid., Big Lousy Moon (released July 2, 2007), Bemusement Park (released in 2011), "The Age of Reasonableness" (2012) and "Nightlife Sentence" (2013) On Big Lousy Moon, Julie LaMendola (of fellow Anti-folk group Ching Chong Song) also joined her as a guest musician.

She has also performed with groups Urban Barnyard and The Phyllis Newman Health Initiative Dancers. Her songwriting was featured on the Disney Channel show Johnny and the Sprites, and in the theater production of Alex Timbers' musical Dance Dance Revolution.

Kreutz has toured extensively in the U.S. and in Europe, sometimes supporting the Canadian band The Burning Hell in spring 2011. She was also invited to perform at the Lawnya Vawnya Art Festival in St. John's, Newfoundland, where the Burning Hell's leader Mathias Kom currently resides. She is also a cult figure in Berlin, Germany, where she repeatedly plays the Fourtrack on Stage concert series and is featured on the Berlin Songs compilation.

A review of her songs called "Awesomer & Awesomer" was produced at the Triad Theater in 2012 and featured Ann Harada, Gwen Hollander, Carey Anderson and Travis Morin. It was directed by Alan Muraoka.

Recently, she has been working on writing a new musical, The Dirty Hippie Jam Band Project .

She was also a member of the pizza-themed Velvet Underground parody band The Pizza Underground, featuring Macaulay Culkin and "Two Kazoos" – a band she formed with her husband, Matt Colbourn.

== Critical reception ==
Kreutz' musical style is often described as "joke-folk", and her songs are often inspired by diverse subjects, such as historical figures ("Oh, Elizabeth I"), literature ("A Bad Feeling About Anna Karenina"), relationships ("Disaster"), and the pitfalls of rock'n'roll excess ("The Ballad of Throat Culture"). About her style, the New York Times wrote, "Phoebe Kreutz's chanteusey delivery and comic writing were genuinely funny".

Following a performance in Edinburgh, Scottish culture magazine The Skinny wrote, "Following this buoyant beginning is the kookily cute Phoebe Kreutz and her jovial tales of lesbian cowgirls and Viking wannabes. Adorably quirky, her voice soars over spiky strumming like a countrified Regina Spektor, using craftily contagious songs to woo the heart of the audience."

The Daily Barometer wrote: "Kreutz is a hilarious songstress, demonstrating the broad-base and sense of humor inherent to the genre. Citing Tiny Tim as inspiration, she sings about wanting to be a pirate, falling in love with a Taco Bell worker (specifically Gary) and a less-than faithful boyfriend."

The Stanford Daily wrote, "It has been said that the third member, Phoebe Kreutz, sings like a lovechild of Joan Baez and Weird Al Yankovic. To me, she sounds like a female version of Adam Sandler, only more focused on the quality of her music than that renowned comedian-turned-songwriter. Working well within the Antifolk community, Kreutz also keeps true to her promise to never write about her feelings."

== Discography ==
=== Albums and EPs ===
- Pretty. Pretty Stupid (2003)
- Big Lousy Moon (2007)
- Bemusement Park (2011)
- The Age of Reasonableness (2012)
- Nightlife Sentence (2013)
- Leaky Canoe (2021)

=== Guest appearances ===
- African Dance Class (2006) by Don Lennon on the album Radical by Don Lennon
- Autumn, Winter, Spring (2010) by Boo Hoo on the album Afgahn Hounds

== Additional projects ==
Kreutz worked on the Broadway and Hallway (and off-Broadway) productions of the popular musical Avenue Q until 2007. She mainly worked as Puppet Wrangler, and was responsible for quickly changing the puppets in and out of their wardrobe between scenes. She also co-wrote a song (with Michael Patrick Walker) for the cast/company recording, "The Holi-daze", found on the Broadway Cares/Equity Fights AIDS CD, Broadway's Greatest Gifts: Carols for a Cure, Vol. 8. She is also joined by Avenue Q alumni (Gary Adler, Michael Croiter, Mark Hartman, and Jen Barnhart) in the group, The Phyllis Newman Health Initiative Dancers, suitably named after The Phyllis Newman Women's Health Initiative.

Kreutz also contributed the songs "Francine" and "Fairyland" (both inspired by the Kurt Vonnegut, Jr book, Breakfast of Champions) and the song "Straight Edge Kids" to the first Bushwick Book Club compilation.

Kreutz was a member of The Pizza Underground, a Velvet Underground cover band also featuring Macaulay Culkin. She provided supporting vocals, and used pizza boxes as instruments.
