= Johnny and the Sprites =

- Created by: John Tartaglia
- Written by: Louise Gikow (head writer)
- Starring: John Tartaglia; Leslie Carrara-Rudolph; Tim Lagasse; Carmen Osbahr; Heather Asch
- Theme music composer: Stephen Schwartz
- Opening theme: "Johnny and the Sprites Theme Song
- Ending theme: "Heads Up!" (instrumental)
- Country of origin: United States
- No. of seasons: 2
- No. of episodes: Shorts: 5; Full-length episodes: 26

Production
- Executive producers: John Tartaglia; Vanessa Amberleigh
- Producer: Deborah Mayer
- Production location: Kaufman Astoria Studios
- Running time: Shorts: 5 minutes; Full-length episodes: 30 minutes
- Production companies: Homegirl Productions (season 1); Happy Puppet Productions

Original release
- Network: Playhouse Disney
- Release: October 9, 2005 – April 19, 2008

Johnny and the Sprites is an American children's musical television show that aired every weekend on the "Playhouse Disney" block on Disney Channel. The show was created by, produced by, and starred John Tartaglia. The show's theme song was written by Stephen Schwartz. Each episode of the show features a musical number, many of which are written by various notable Broadway composers such as Gary Adler, Bobby Lopez, Laurence O'Keefe, Michael Patrick Walker, and others. The Sprites and all of the other creatures that inhabit Johnny's world were designed by Michael Schupbach. The set was designed by Laura Brock.

Five shorts (each lasting 5 minutes) were shown on October 9, 2005 and were continually shown on Disney Channel's programming that same day. Due to extremely positive audience reaction, the show became a half-hour series that debuted on January 13, 2007. The current episodes can also be viewed on the Disney Channel's official website. The show was then renewed for a second season of half-hour episodes, which were filmed in fall 2007 at Kaufman Astoria Studios in Queens, New York City (the same studio as Sesame Street). The second season debuted on January 19, 2008. The series finale aired on April 19, 2008.

The show follows Johnny T (Tartaglia), a songwriter who moves into a house given to him by his great-uncle. There, he discovers little magical creatures called "sprites," who introduce him to their fantasy world. In return, Johnny shows the sprites, named Ginger (Leslie Carrara-Rudolph), Basil (Tim Lagasse), Lily (Carmen Osbahr) and Root (Heather Asch) what it is to be human, teaching them lessons through song, dance, and entertainment.

In October 2007, Disney-MGM Studios presented a live version of the show as part of the Playhouse Disney in Concert shows.

In the Spanish dubbed version of the program, Johnny's voice is dubbed by the host of Playhouse Disney Latin America, Diego Topa.

Beginning on March 23, 2012, the show reran on the Disney Junior channel and was removed on September 3, 2013.

== Full series ==
Johnny and the Sprites features more elaborate sets, such as a reflecting pond and the Sprites' home in Grotto's Grove. Three new Sprites were added: Lily, a water Sprite played by Carmen Osbahr; Root, "a budding earth Sprite" played by Heather Asch; and Sage, the wisest of the Sprites, also played by Tartaglia. Natalie Venetia Belcon (who, along with fellow cast member John Tartaglia also had a role in Avenue Q) plays Gwen, a recurring character who, as a running gag, holds a different occupation in each episode. She always explains that "You never know what you can do, until you try something new." Johnny's older sister Tina (Sutton Foster) has also appeared. Each show consists of two 10-minute mini-episodes. Each episode also features the song "Heads Up!" by Gary Adler and Phoebe Kreutz, performed by Johnny, Lily, Root, Ginger, and Basil in between the two 10-minute episodes.

== Characters ==
=== Humans ===
- Johnny (performed by John Tartaglia) is a young composer who comes to live in his great-uncle's old house to work on his music. He is the star of the show.
- Gwen (performed by Natalie Venetia Belcon) is Johnny's neighbor and best friend. She is always "trying out something new" and often has a different job every time she visits. In Season 2, Gwen officially meets the Sprites.
- Miss Moldystew (performed by John Tartaglia) is Johnny's cranky neighbour. Only appears in the shorts.

=== Sprites ===
- Ginger (performed and voiced by Leslie Carrara-Rudolph) is a pink Air Sprite with a spunky, sporty attitude.
- Basil (performed and voiced by Tim Lagasse) is a green Forest Sprite with red glasses. He is very smart and knows a great deal about Sprite history and gardening.
- Lily (performed and voiced by Carmen Osbahr) is a blue Water Sprite who is able to speak Spanish. She is very in touch with nature and loves to paint.
- Root (performed and voiced by Heather Asch) is a yellow and red Earth Sprite who can get plants to grow just by talking to them. He is the youngest, shyest, and smallest of the Sprites.
- Sage (performed and voiced by John Tartaglia) is the oldest and wisest Sprite of them all. When the younger Sprites need advice or lack knowledge on a subject, they often confer with him.

=== Other ===
- Seymour (performed and voiced by Jim Kroupa) is not a Sprite, but a Schmole (a purple, talking mole). He lives in (or rather 'under') Johnny's backyard and has quite an appetite.
- The Fuzzies are small, colorful creatures that live with the Sprites and enjoy hanging out with Johnny and they often do work for the Sprites.

== Episodes ==
=== Shorts (2005) ===
1. Who's on First? - Ginger wants Johnny to play basketball with her, but Basil wants him to read his favorite book, Famous Shrubs from Then to Now. They debate whether what he wants to do with them until Johnny explains the importance of taking turns. "One Good Turn", Music and Lyrics by Michael Patrick Walker. (Originally aired October 9, 2005)

2. Laugh, Basil, Laugh - When Basil comes down with a cold, Johnny and Ginger discover that the best way to make a sick Sprite feel better is to make them laugh. Johnny sings a song about all the things to make someone laugh, but it doesn't work, but Basil laughs when Johnny does silly yoga poses. "Make Someone Laugh", Music and Lyrics by Gary Adler. (Originally aired October 9, 2005)

3. Leave a Little Lettuce - When Seymour the Schmole takes all of the lettuce in Johnny's garden, Ginger demonstrates the advantages of sharing. "Leave A Little Lettuce", Music and Lyrics by Marcy Heisler and Zina Goldrich. (Originally aired October 9, 2005)

4. Yes You Can! - Basil has lost another flying contest to Ginger for the zillionth time, but Johnny helps him remember all the great things he can do. "The Things You Can Do", Music and Lyrics by Gary Adler. (Originally aired October 9, 2005)

5. Waiting for the Stars - Ginger and Basil are about to see the stars for the very first time, but they just can't wait. It takes all of Johnny's patience to convince them that sometimes, wonderful things are worth the wait. "Waiting For The Stars", Music and Lyrics by Stephen Schwartz. (Originally aired October 9, 2005)

=== Season 1 (2007) ===
1. Turbo-Car Johnny/Ginger's Antenna Dilemma
- Johnny gets the Ultimate Turbo Car Racer video game and plays it for hours on end, ignoring the Sprites. After waking up from a nightmare where the Sprites left because they got bored of him playing the game, Johnny decides to go back outside and play with them. Then, after seeing her antennae in a picture, Ginger thinks they are too curly and starts to become self-conscious. (Originally aired January 13, 2007)

Music:

"I Just Can't Get Enough", Music and Lyrics by Benj Pasek and Justin Paul.
"Muddle in the Puddle", Music and Lyrics by Mark Hollmann
"There's Nobody Quite Like You", Music and Lyrics by Mark Hollmann

2. Root's Dadoots/The Rare Nospotalotacus
-While Johnny struggles on a new song, Root gets the dadoots (the Sprite hiccups). The Sprites do their best to help them, but Johnny, however, finds a way to bring his song together by integrating Root's dadoots. Then, after Johnny and Root hear the call of the endangered nospotalotacus, the sprites realize they need to get it out of Johnny's garden and to Grotto's Grove right away. They discover that teamwork is the best solution. (Originally aired January 14, 2007)

Music:

"What a Surprise!", Music and Lyrics by Gary Adler
"Nospotalotacus", Music and Lyrics by Mark Hollmann

3. Johnny's Sister Tina/Spritesgiving!
-Johnny's sister Tina (Sutton Foster) visits and he explains to the Sprites what a sister is. Later on, it's Spritesgiving and Basil is put in charge of the feast but when all the plants get the Forgetful Fungus, will they have to put the feast on hold? (Originally aired January 20, 2007)

Music:

"It All Adds Up to My Sister", Music and Lyrics by Gary Adler
"A Fungus Among Us", Music and Lyrics by Michael Patrick Walker

4. The Sprites and the What?!/Doctor Basil
-Johnny is cooking dinner for Gwen, but then he loses his colander. Seymour finds it and the Sprites come up with many creative uses for it. However, dinner is delayed because Gwen is sick and it's raining. So Johnny invites the Sprites to dinner. Then, when Johnny gets a bad cold, Basil decides to take care of him. He tries out various remedies without success, but finally discovers something very important that he forgot to do: ask! (Originally aired January 27, 2007)

Music:

"How it Works", Music and Lyrics by Gary Adler and Phoebe Kreutz
"All You Have to Do Is Ask", Music and Lyrics by Billy Lopez and Bobby Lopez

5. Ginger Listens/Aloha Johnny
-When Ginger temporarily loses her ability to speak because she has run out of words for the day, she begins to realize the importance of listening. Then, when Johnny gets a letter from his older sister Lina inviting him to spend a week in Hawaii, he makes immediate plans to visit, which causes the Sprites to think he's leaving forever. (Originally aired February 3, 2007)

Music:

"Stop and Listen", Music and Lyrics by Ryan Cunningham and Joshua Salzman
"Aloha", Music and Lyrics by Zina Goldrich and Marcy Heisler

6. Seymour's Guest/Root of Passage
-Russel, a 'Schwombat' from Australia and Seymour's cousin, visits, but his nocturnal nature keeps Johnny and the Sprites up at night. They have to learn to get along despite their differences. Then, Root is old enough to walk through the portal all by himself. He chooses Johnny to be his friend at the end - will Root make it or be too scared? (Originally aired February 10, 2007)

Music:

"Git Along Little Sprites" Music and Lyrics by Michael Patrick Walker
"Through the Portal" Music and Lyrics by David Kirshenbaum

7. The Sprites Sleep Over/Seymour the Sleuth
The Sprites have a sleepover at Johnny's house, but they can't sleep because things are so different back in The Grove where they normally sleep. Then, watermelons go missing from Johnny's garden and Seymour unravels the mystery with the help of Johnny and the Sprites. (Originally Aired February 17, 2007)

Music:

"Feelin' 'Grove'-y", music and lyrics by Michael Patrick Walker
"Seymour the Sleuth", Music and Lyrics by Laurence O'Keefe

8. Spring Tuning/Where's the Water, Lily?
When the Sprites find out that the "Spring Tuners" can't come to the grove to "wake up the earth", they ask Johnny to substitute. Then When Johnny gets a new water fountain, water begins to disappear from the grove. Lily learns that there is a reason for everything. (Originally Aired March 17, 2007)

Music:

"Time to Wake Up", Music and Lyrics by Gary Adler
"Reason and Rhyme", Music and Lyrics by Michael Patrick Walker

9. Ginger and the Shell/Fuzzies' Day Off
Ginger finds Lily's missing shell but struggles with whether to keep it for herself or give it back to her friend. Then when the Fuzzies throw a giant beach party for their 15th Millennial Day Off, Johnny and the Sprites struggle to take care of Grotto's Grove without the Fuzzies' help. (Originally Aired April 20, 2007)

Music:

"The Hardest Thing to Do", Music and Lyrics by Benj Pasek and Justin Paul
"Fuzzies' Frug", Music and Lyrics by Gary Adler and Michael Patrick Walker

10. Basil's Band/The Sprites' Rules
Basil discovers something about making promises - and keeping them - when he joins a band and forgets about all of his friends. Features a vocal cameo appearance by the cast of the Off-Broadway hit Altar Boyz. The Sprites decide to make rules to keep the Grove running smoothly. (Originally Aired May 19, 2007)

Music:

"That's What Friends Do", Music and Lyrics by Gary Adler and Michael Patrick Walker
"Rules are Made for a Reason", Music and lyrics by Zina Goldrich and Marcy Heisler

11. Ginger's Grounded/Baby Johnny
When Ginger injures her wing, the Sprites have to find a way to spread Spoffle (Sprite plant food) over all of the plants in Grotto's Grove. And when Johnny accidentally wishes he could be a baby for just one day, the Sprites learn about taking care of others. (Originally Aired July 21, 2007)

Music:

"No Spoffle", Music and Lyrics by Gary Adler
"Sleepytime Lullaby", Music and lyrics by Zina Goldrich and Marcy Heisler

12. Laugh Sprites, Laugh/Hola, Lily
Basil and Root find a patch of laughing lilacs which make them, Ginger, and eventually Johnny, laugh uncontrollably. The Sprites hurry to find a cure in time for Johnny to attend a formal dance with his friend Gwen. Then, Lily returns from a trip around the world having met many new friends, all of whom say hello in a different way. (Originally Aired September 15, 2007)

Music:

"It's a Funny Thing", Music and lyrics by David Kirshenbaum
"So Many Ways To Say 'Hello'", Music and Lyrics by Gary Adler and Phoebe Kreutz

13. A Very Spritely Holiday/A Sprites Snow Day
In this Christmas-themed episode, the Sprites watch with curiosity as Johnny and Gwen decorate for the holidays and exchange gifts. With Sage's permission, the Sprites give Johnny a gift and learn the true meaning of the holiday season. Then, a big snowstorm blocks the entrance to the Grove forcing the Sprites to stay at Johnny's and try to keep themselves secret from Gwen. (Originally Aired December 1, 2007)

Music:

"Brightly Shining", Music and Lyrics by Stephen Schwartz
"Til You Try Out Something New", Music and Lyrics by Ryan Cunningham and Joshua Salzman

=== Season 2 (2008) ===
1. Gwen Meets the Sprites/A Biddow for Root
When a spell goes wrong, Gwen begins to turn into a bunny. She meets the Sprites later after the spell is broken. Lily tries to clean Root's favorite pillow (or, his "biddow", as he calls it), but mistakenly ruins it. (Originally Aired January 19, 2008)

Music:

"A New Friend", Music and Lyrics by Michael Patrick Walker
"Not My Biddow", Music and Lyrics by Benj Pasek and Justin Paul

2. The Bridge Troll/This Is Your Life, Johnny
On their way to a picnic, Johnny, the Sprites and Gwen encounter a Bridge Troll (Christian Borle). Ginger gets stage fright during a play in honor of Johnny's birthday. (Originally Aired January 26, 2008)

Music:

"A Good Song!", Music and Lyrics by Michael Patrick Walker
"Give It a Try", Music and Lyrics by Zina Goldrich and Marcy Heisler

3. Johnny the Mud Troll/Helpful Basil
Ginger mistakenly turns Johnny into a Mud Troll. Basil loses the key to his helpful hints book. (Originally Aired February 2, 2008)

Music:

"Bad Day to Be a Mud Troll", Music and Lyrics by Gary Adler and Phoebe Kreutz
"I Believe in You, Basil", Music and Lyrics by Michael Patrick Walker

4. Johnny and the Love Bug/The Twenty-Foot Root
Lily makes a love bug for Valentine's Day. Tired of being too small, Root makes himself grow. (Originally Aired February 9, 2008)

Music:

"You Make My Heart Go 'Hop'", Music and Lyrics by Gary Adler and Phoebe Kreutz
"The Right Size", Music and Lyrics by Gary Adler and Phoebe Kreutz

5. The Sprites Plan a Party/Basil and the Magic Watermelon
The Sprites plan a surprise party for Johnny. Basil and Root search for the magic watermelon of great weight so that the Fuzzies will stop floating away. (Originally Aired February 16, 2008)

Music:

"It's Party Time", Music and Lyrics by Ryan Cunningham and Joshua Salzman
"Never Give Up!", Music and Lyrics by Michael Patrick Walker

6. Root and the Tickle Troll/Ginger Goes for the Glory
While waiting for Johnny to come home, the Sprites think a Tickle Troll is outside Johnny's house. When Ginger tries to break the flying record she gets help from an unexpected source. (Originally Aired February 23, 2008)

Music:

"The Tickle Troll", Music and Lyrics by Benj Pasek and Justin Paul
"I Can Do It!", Music and Lyrics by Ryan Cunningham and Joshua Salzman

7. Lily's Hair/Ginger and the Cloud
Lily asks Root to make her hair grow longer. While flying, Ginger makes friends with a playful cloud. (Originally Aired March 1, 2008)

Music:

"A Brand New 'Do", Music and Lyrics by Carmel Dean and Mariana Elder
"Playing in the Air!", Music and Lyrics by Mark Hollmann

8. A Johnny for Everyone/Lily and the Frog Princess
When Basil, Lily and Ginger each want to do something different with Johnny, they cast a spell to turn one Johnny into three. Lily turns her pet frog, Francesca, into a princess (Ann Sanders). (Originally Aired March 8, 2008)

Music:

"Play With Me", Music and Lyrics by Michael Patrick Walker
"I Wanna Be Me", Music and Lyrics by Michael Kosarin and Jim Luigs

9. Johnny's Not Invited/Basil and the Beanstalk
The Queen of all Magical Beings (Chita Rivera) visits the Grove, but only invites magical beings to her party. Basil climbs a giant beanstalk and picks the giant vegetables he finds growing there, but they belong to a hungry giant (Paul Vogt). (Originally Aired March 15, 2008)

Music:

"Welcome to Grotto's Grove", Music and Lyrics by Michael Patrick Walker
"My Lucky Day", Music and Lyrics by Stephen Sislen and Alisa Klein

10. The Sprites Save Grotto's Grove/Seymour's New Home
When a pushy real estate developer (Ann Harada) wants to build a hotel in Johnny's back yard, the Sprites and Johnny must stop her. When a log blocks the entrance to Seymour's burrow, Johnny helps him find a new home. (Originally Aired March 22, 2008)

Music:

"Everything Must Go", Music and Lyrics by Laurence O'Keefe
"Home Sweet Home Sweet Home", Music and Lyrics by Michael Patrick Walker

11. Johnny and the Sprites Shrink/Johnny's Gotta Dance
An "uh-oh" berry makes Johnny and the Sprites shrink. Lily tries to make Johnny a better dancer by casting a spell on his shoes. (Originally Aired March 29, 2008)

Music:

"A Giant World", Music and Lyrics by Benj Pasek and Justin Paul
"Dancin' Feet", Music and Lyrics by Zina Goldrich and Marcy Heisler

12. Johnny's Troll Trouble/Basil the Dogsitter
Things are all set for Root's birthday party until a "Make-A-Mess" Troll (Christopher Sieber) shows up. Basil can't find the little dog he said he would watch. (Originally Aired April 4, 2008)

Music:

"Follow Me!", Music and Lyrics by Michael Patrick Walker
"I Will Find You", Music and Lyrics by Benj Pasek and Justin Paul

13. Johnny Helps Mother Nature/The Sprites Grow a Rainbow
The Sprites must play host to a visiting Mother Nature (Angie Radosh). Color worms remove the color from the Grove. (Originally Aired April 19, 2008)

Music:

"Clean and Green!", Music and Lyrics by Michael Patrick Walker
"All Because of You and Me", Music and Lyrics by David Kirshenbaum

== See also ==
- Bunnytown
- Imagination Movers
- The Doodlebops
- Out of the Box
- The Wiggles
- Bear in the Big Blue House
- The Book of Pooh
- Ooh, Aah & You
