= Michael Patrick Walker =

American composer and lyricist

- Education: Carnegie Mellon University
- Occupations: Composer; lyricist; musician
- Notable work: Altar Boyz
- Website: michaelpatrickwalker.com

Michael Patrick Walker is a composer, lyricist, writer, and musician.

== Life ==
Walker was born in Carlisle, Pennsylvania, and raised in New Freedom, Pennsylvania. He lived in Pittsburgh for several years while earning his bachelor's degree from Carnegie Mellon University and then moved to New York City, where he currently resides. He played piano and keyboards and/or conducted for various theatrical Broadway, Off-Broadway, and touring productions including Stephen Sondheim's Old Friends, Once Upon A Mattress (2024 Revival), Some Like It Hot, Frozen, Aladdin, If/Then, Avenue Q (conductor), the Roundabout Theatre Company's production of The Tin Pan Alley Rag (music director/arranger), Wicked, The Lion King, Thoroughly Modern Millie, and tick, tick... BOOM! (conductor).

== Work as composer/lyricist ==
Walker, with fellow composer/lyricist Gary Adler and book writer Kevin Del Aguila, wrote and created the Off-Broadway musical Altar Boyz, which won the 2005 Outer Critics Circle Award for Best Off-Broadway Musical. Additionally, the show was nominated for seven Drama Desk Awards (including two each for Walker and Adler for Best Music and for Best Lyrics) and four Lucille Lortel Awards including Best Off-Broadway Musical. The show ran for 2,032 performances, making it the ninth-longest running Off-Broadway musical of all time. It has been translated into multiple languages to be performed around the world.

From 2005 through 2008, Walker composer numerous songs for the Emmy-nominated Disney Channel TV Series Johnny and the Sprites, becoming the music director and supervisor for Season 2 of the show. In this capacity, Walker served as the lead composer, oversaw a team of theatre composers who wrote the original songs for each episode, and developed the stories for each of 26 scripts for the series. He also arranged, orchestrated, and produced the recordings of the songs and co-produced the CD for the series. Season 2 of Johnny and the Sprites received four Daytime Emmy Award nominations, including one for Outstanding Pre-School Children's Series. His involvement lead to his writing original music and lyrics for the Nick Jr. Channel television show Olivia.

In 2009, another musical Walker co-created and for which he wrote the score, The Distant Bells, was selected as a finalist for the Eugene O'Neill Theater Center's musical theater conference. This led to a 2011 reading produced by the Roundabout Theatre Company which starred Chita Rivera, Ana Gasteyer, and Rachel York.

On November 8, 2011, Walker's album of his music and lyrics, Out of Context: The Songs of Michael Patrick Walker, was released on the Yellow Sound Label. It includes songs from his musical in development, trunk songs, stand-alone songs, and a new version of "I Believe" from Altar Boyz. The 13 tracks were performed by Broadway performers including Cheyenne Jackson, Kelli O'Hara, Telly Leung, Michael Arden, Rachel York, Lisa Howard, Peter Friedman, Andy Karl, Anne L. Nathan, Kate Wetherhead, Kerry O'Malley, Natalie Venetia Belcon, Jim Stanek, Andy Mientus, and Noah Galvin. Walker co-produced the album with Yellow Sound Label co-founder Michael Croiter.

In 2014, Walker's next musical, Dog and Pony, with music and lyrics by Walker and book by Rick Elice, had its world premiere at the Old Globe Theatre in San Diego, starring Nicole Parker, Jon Patrick Walker, Heidi Blickenstaff, Beth Leavel, and Eric William Morris, with direction by Roger Rees.

As of 2025, he has several musicals in development including two new original musicals (being theo and Cupid's Error) with book, music and lyrics by Walker.

== Awards ==
Year	Award	Category	Nominated work	Result
2005	Outer Critics Circle Award	Outstanding Off-Broadway Musical	Altar Boyz	Won
2005	Drama Desk Award	Outstanding Music	Altar Boyz	Nominated
2005	Drama Desk Award	Outstanding Lyrics	Altar Boyz	Nominated
2005	Lucille Lortel Award	Outstanding Musical	Altar Boyz	Nominated
