= Kevin Del Aguila =

American actor and writer (born 1969)

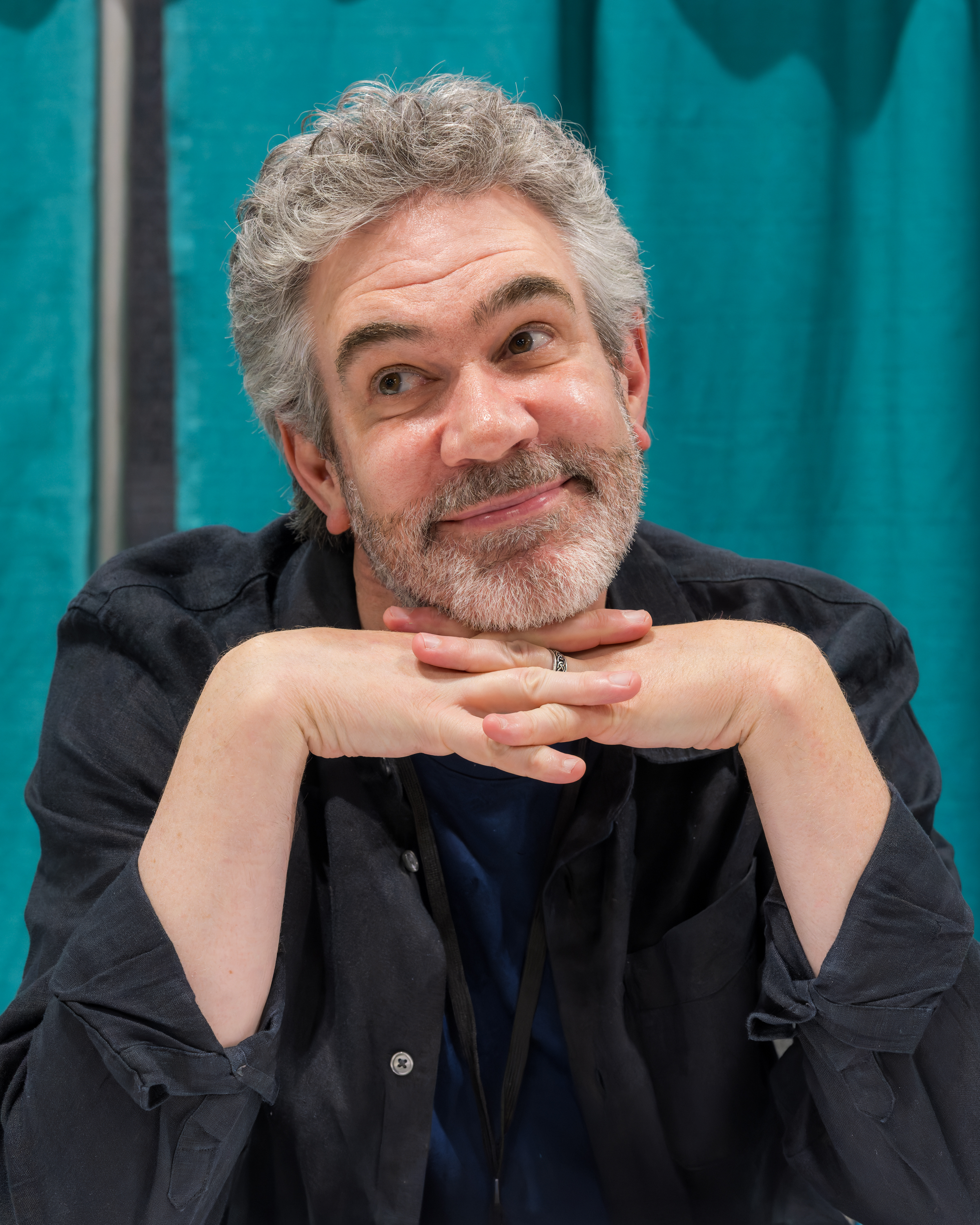
- Del Aguila at Animate! Orlando in 2026
- Born: November 12, 1969 (age 56)
- Education: Temple University (MFA)
- Occupation: Actor • Writer
- Years active: 2002–present
- Known for: Some Like It Hot (musical) Peter and the Starcatcher (play) Frozen (musical) Hazbin Hotel
- Website: http://www.delaguila.info/about

Kevin Del Aguila (born November 12, 1969) is an American actor and writer. He was nominated for a Tony Award for his role as Osgood Fielding III in the Broadway musical Some Like It Hot. He also originated the roles of Oaken in the Broadway version of Disney's Frozen and Smee in Peter and the Starcatcher. Del Aguila also voices Baxter in the adult animated black comedy musical series Hazbin Hotel.

In addition to acting, Del Aguila writes for television and the stage. He wrote the book of the musical comedy Altar Boyz, which ran off-Broadway from 2005 to 2010 and won the Outer Critics Circle Award for Outstanding New Off-Broadway Musical. Del Aguila has won two Daytime Emmy Awards for Outstanding Writing in a Pre-School Animated Program on the animated children's television series Peg+Cat. He has written multiple theatrical adaptations of children's literature, including Diary of a Wimpy Kid, Dog Man, Cat Kid Comic Club and The Velveteen Rabbit for the nonprofit arts organization TheatreWorks USA.

== Personal life ==
Del Aguila was born in Bakersfield, California to a British mother and Peruvian father. His introduction to music was through his mother, a church organist who accompanied his father, a minister.

He received his Master of Fine Arts from Temple University in 1994.

== Career ==
=== Writing for theatre and television (2002–present) ===
Del Aguila's first play was 6 Story Building (also stylized as Six Story Building), which consisted of seven connected one-act narratives following the residents on each floor of a New York City apartment building. 6 Story Building won Best Production at the New York Fringe Festival in 2002.

Del Aguila was approached by composers Gary Adler and Michael Patrick Walker to write the book for Altar Boyz. The musical comedy, a satire of Christian pop and 2000's boy band culture, premiered at the New World Stages on March 1, 2005 and won the Outer Critics Circle Award for Outstanding Off-Broadway Musical. Altar Boyz closed on January 10, 2010, after 2032 performances. At the time of its closing, Altar Boyz was the ninth-longest running show in off-Broadway history.

Del Aguila wrote the book and lyrics for Dog Man: The Musical based on the popular children's book series by Captain Underpants author Dav Pilkey. Dog Man: The Musical opened off-Broadway in 2019 at the Lucille Lortel Theatre and has since had a US tour and played at the Southbank Centre in London.

He has adapted many other popular children's books into plays produced by the nonprofit arts organization TheatreWorks USA, including Click, Clack, Moo, The Velveteen Rabbit, Skippyjon Jones, and Diary of a Wimpy Kid.

Additionally, Del Aguila has written for a number of children's television programs, including Wonder Pets!, Clifford the Big Red Dog, Blue's Clues & You, and Peg+Cat. For his writing on the latter, he won two Daytime Emmy Awards.

=== Acting (2011–present) ===
Del Aguila originated the role of Smee in Peter and the Starcatcher, which premiered off-Broadway at the New York Theatre Workshop in 2011 and twice extended its run.

In 2012, Del Aguila made his Broadway debut reprising his role as Smee in the Broadway transfer of Peter and the Starcatcher, which played at the Brooks Atkinson Theatre from April 15, 2012 to January 20, 2013. He continued to play Mr. Smee when Peter and the Starcatcher transferred off-Broadway to the New World Stages in 2013.

Later in 2013, Del Aguila played Anthony Dull in the Public Theater's rock musical adaptation of Love's Labour's Lost as part of Shakespeare in the Park.

He performed multiple roles in the Encores! staged concert rendition of Kurt Vonnegut's God Bless You Mr. Rosewater, the first collaboration between composer Alan Menken and lyricist Howard Ashman. Del Aguila also recorded the cast album, which was the first official recording of the 1979 musical.

Del Aguila originated the role of Oaken in the musical adaptation of Disney's Frozen, and played the role from 2018 to 2020.

In March 2022, it was announced that Del Aguila was cast as Osgood Fielding III in a workshop for the musical Some Like it Hot, based on the 1959 film of the same name. Some Like it Hot opened on Broadway at the Shubert Theatre on December 11, 2022. The character of Osgood was expanded upon in the stage version, where he is revealed to be half Mexican, baptized Pedro Francisco Alvarez. For his performance as Osgood/Pedro, Del Aguila was nominated for a Tony Award for Best Performance by an Actor in a Featured Role in a Musical.

In 2024, Del Aguila played Actor A in David Henry Hwang's Yellow Face on Broadway and was a replacement Mr. Mushnik in the off-Broadway revival of Little Shop of Horrors.

Del Aguila voiced the character Baxter in the second season of the adult animated black comedy series Hazbin Hotel, which was released in 2025.

In 2026, it was announced that Del Aguila was to star in a new musical, Basura, under a creative team led by Michael Greif, Karen Zacarías, and Alex Lacamoire. Basura made its out-of-town debut on May 30, 2026 at the Alliance Theatre's Coca-Cola Stage in Atlanta.

== Theatre credits ==
Year(s)	Production	Role	Location	Notes
2011	Peter and the Starcatcher	Smee	New York Theatre Workshop; Off-Broadway	Original off-Broadway Cast
2012–2013	Peter and the Starcatcher	Smee	Brooks Atkinson Theatre; Broadway	Original Broadway Cast
2013	Peter and the Starcatcher	Smee	New World Stages; Off-Broadway	
2013	Love's Labour's Lost	Dull	The Delacorte Theater	
2014	Rocky the Musical	Mike et al.	Winter Garden Theatre; Broadway	Original Broadway Cast
2016	Kurt Vonnegut's God Bless You, Mr. Rosewater	Noyes Finnerty et al.	Encores! New York City Center	
2018–2020	Frozen	Oaken	St. James Theatre; Broadway	Original Broadway Cast
2022–2023	Some Like it Hot	Osgood Fielding III/Pedro Francisco Alvarez	Shubert Theatre; Broadway	Original Broadway Cast
2024	Yellow Face	Actor A	Todd Haimes Theatre; Broadway	Original Broadway Cast
2024	Little Shop of Horrors	Mr. Mushnik	Westside Theatre; Off-Broadway	Replacement
2024	Once Upon a Mattress	Wizard	Ahmanson Theatre	
2025	Schmigadoon!	Reverend Layton/Leprechaun	The Kennedy Center; World Premiere	
2025	The Baker's Wife	Antoine	Lynn F. Angelson Theater; Off-Broadway	Original off-Broadway Cast
2026	Basura	Mario	Alliance Theatre	

== Awards and nominations ==
Year	Award	Category	Work	Result
2005	Outer Critics Circle Award	Outstanding New Off-Broadway Musical	Altar Boyz	Won
2010	Lucille Lortel Award	Outstanding Musical	Click, Clack, Moo	Nominated
2011	Lucille Lortel Award	Outstanding Musical	We the People: America Rocks!	Nominated
2015	Daytime Emmy Award	Outstanding Writing in a Pre-School Animated Program	Peg+Cat	Won
2016	Daytime Emmy Award	Outstanding Original Song	Peg+Cat, "Fairy Tale Wedding"	Nominated
2016	Daytime Emmy Award	Outstanding Writing in a Pre-School Animated Program	Peg+Cat	Won
2018	Daytime Emmy Award	Outstanding Writing in a Pre-School Animated Program	Peg+Cat	Nominated
2019	Daytime Emmy Award	Outstanding Original Song in a Children's or Animated Program	Peg+Cat, "You're All Number One Tonight!"	Nominated
2019	Daytime Emmy Award	Outstanding Writing in a Pre-School Animated Program	Peg+Cat	Nominated
2023	Outer Critics Circle Award	Outstanding Featured Performer in a Broadway Musical	Some Like It Hot	Nominated
2023	Drama Desk Award	Outstanding Featured Performance in a Musical	Some Like It Hot	Won
2023	Tony Award	Best Featured Actor in a Musical	Some Like It Hot	Nominated
