= Rick Lyon =

American puppeteer (born 1958)

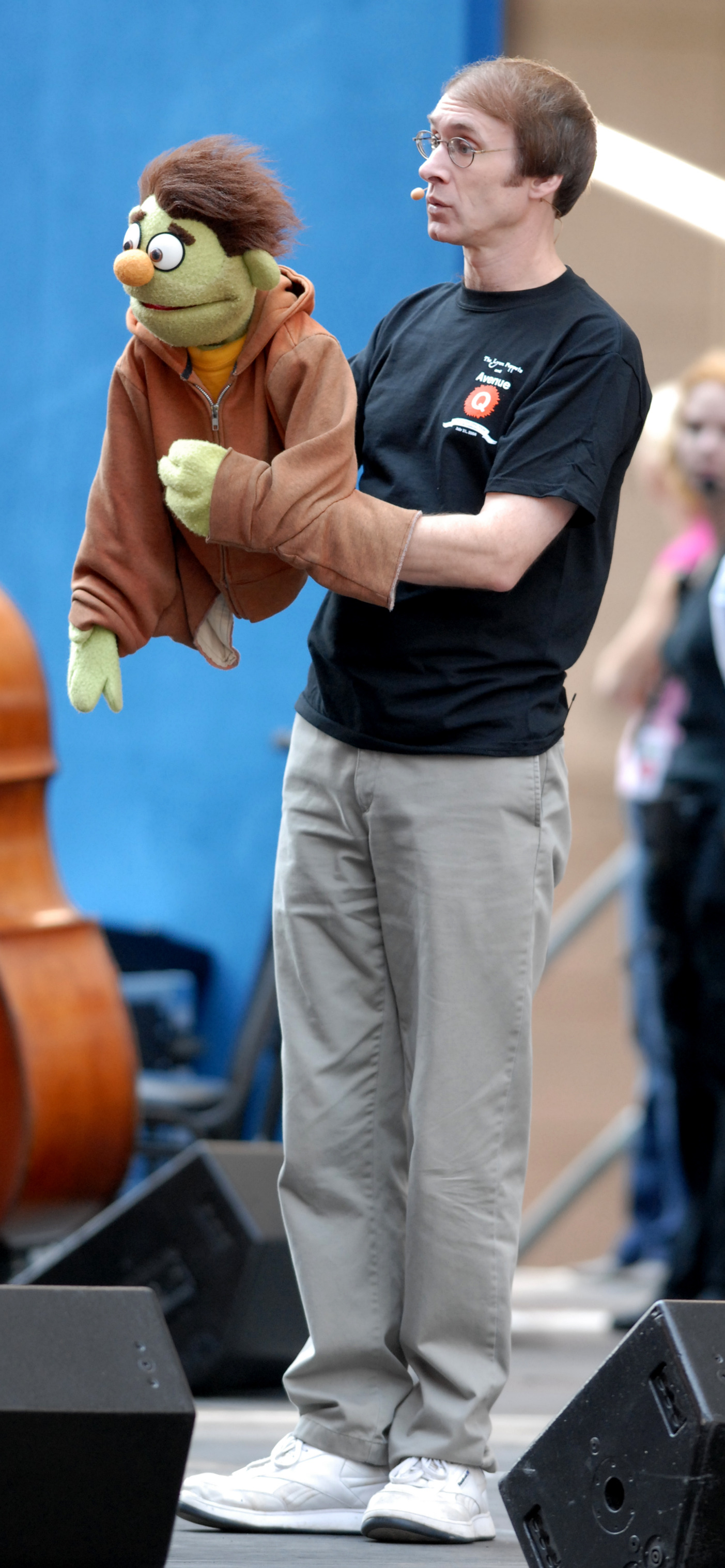
- Lyon, performing the Avenue Q character Nicky, during a performance in 2006
- Born: Richard S. Lyon; February 25, 1958 (age 68); Rochester, New York
- Education: Penn State University
- Occupations: Puppeteer, puppet designer, actor, puppet builder
- Years active: 1987–present
- Website: www.lyonpuppets.com

Richard S. Lyon (born February 25, 1958) is an American puppeteer, actor, and puppet designer and builder.

Lyon has worked for The Jim Henson Company as one of the operators of Big Bird. He appeared on Broadway originating the roles of Trekkie Monster, Nicky, the blue Bad Idea Bear, and other characters in the Tony Award-winning musical Avenue Q, a musical for which he designed and created all of the puppets. In the fall of 2005 he reprised his roles in the production of the show in Las Vegas for eight months before returning to the Broadway cast. Lyon was a puppeteer on Sesame Street for 15 seasons, from 1987 to 2002. He also worked with Nickelodeon on the Stick Stickly project and on the Me + My Friends pilot. He was a lead puppeteer for the first season of Comedy Central's television program Crank Yankers. Lyon has also appeared numerous times on The Late Show with Stephen Colbert, for which he also provided the puppets he performed. He puppeteered a xenomorph chest burster in an "Alien" parody sketch with guest star Sigourney Weaver, and Yoda, Kermit the Frog, and Big Bird in satirical sketches, a pair of singing pants, and the Number Two. He also performed the Kukla, Fran, and Ollie-inspired puppets for the black and white throwback clip on the "15th Episode Anniversary Show" of At Home with Amy Sedaris.

Lyon's company, The Lyon Puppets, maintains a large permanent workshop outside New York City in New Jersey. In addition to building all of the Broadway and Las Vegas Avenue Q puppets, the company has built puppets for the original West End production of Avenue Q in London, the US national tour, and international productions in Brazil, Mexico, Australia, Switzerland, Germany, France, and China. Lyon frequently coaches actors in puppetry for productions of Avenue Q for which he provides puppets. He also directed a production of Avenue Q at Smithtown PAC.

He studied theater at Penn State University and puppetry at the Institute of Professional Puppetry Arts in Connecticut and the Institut International de la Marionnette in France.

== Puppeteering credits ==
- Sesame Street - television
- Crank Yankers - television
- Bear in the Big Blue House - television
- Avenue Q - Broadway
- Muppet*Vision 3D - film attraction at Disney's Hollywood Studios
- The Book of Pooh - television
- Teenage Mutant Ninja Turtles II: The Secret of the Ooze - film
- Teenage Mutant Ninja Turtles III - film
- The Neverending Story III - film
- Men in Black - film
- Binyah Binyah! - television
- Me and My Friends - television
- The Late Show With Stephen Colbert - television
- At Home with Amy Sedaris - television
