= Altar Boyz =

Musical comedy by Adler and Walker

- Music: Gary Adler; Michael Patrick Walker
- Lyrics: Gary Adler; Michael Patrick Walker
- Book: Kevin Del Aguila
- Productions: 2004 NY Musical Theatre Festival; 2005 Off Broadway; 2007-2009 U.S. tour Korean; Hungarian; 2007 Chicago Resident Production; 2009 Celebration Theatre Production

Altar Boyz is a musical comedy with music and lyrics by Gary Adler and Michael Patrick Walker and a book by Kevin Del Aguila (based on an idea by Marc J. Kessler and Ken Davenport). Centering on a fictitious Christian boy band from Ohio, the show satirizes, among other things, the phenomenon of boy bands and the popularity of Christian-themed music in contemporary American culture. It began an Off Broadway run on March 1, 2005, and closed on January 10, 2010, after sixteen previews and 2,032 regular performances, making it the 9th longest-running Off-Broadway musical of all time.

== Synopsis ==
Setting: Dodger Stages, New York City

The musical is presented in real-time as the final concert of the national "Raise the Praise" tour staged by the five-member group the Altar Boyz. Four of the group's members, Matthew ("the leader"), Mark ("the sensitive one"), Luke ("the bad boy") and Juan ("the Latin Lover"), apparently are named after the authors of the four canonical Christian Gospels. The fifth member is Abraham, who, the group explains in the show's opening number, is Jewish. The members of the group address the audience directly and refer to the venue and location in which the performance is taking place.

The Altar Boyz came out to introduce themselves (We Are The Altar Boyz). They go on to explain their love of God in song (Rhythm In Me). They use a gadget from SONY called the "Soul Sensor DX-12", which tells them and the audience how many souls need to be saved. At this performance, 99 souls need to be saved. The first attempt to save them comes from the Boyz singing about how to behave when at church (Church Rulez). This is a success.

The five Boyz proceed to perform biased skits based on what they remember of the band's formation.

Matthew remembers having trouble writing a song for the retirement party of Father Lucas, a priest at the church he attended. Mark enters the church but does not offer much help.

Mark remembers Matthew complimenting his hair and becomes flustered. In this skit, Matthew says that he is writing a love song for Jesus.

In Luke's point of view, his friends are completely silent when he enters the church.

Juan recalls running in and meeting the Boyz for the first time. He dramatically explains that he was born in a church in Tijuana, but found a way to Ohio, in search of his parents. Matthew, Mark, and Luke react very insensitively to this.

In Abraham's point of view, he enters to give Luke his term paper, done for Luke by Abraham. Luke points out that Abraham is a writer, and Abraham agrees to help him write the song if he gives him a robe, and Matthew agrees. However, Abraham does not finish the song. Suddenly, they are encountered by God (Or, the voice of G.O.D), who demands for the Boyz to become a boy band. Abraham believes this is a mistake, but the Boyz obey. (The Calling).

After the song, the Boyz explain their jobs in the group. Matthew is the leader, Mark is the choreographer, Juan picks out the clothes, Abraham is the songwriter, and Luke drives the tour van. According to Matthew, Luke has had to go to rehabilitation, and Luke swears he went there for exhaustion. The Boyz break out in a rap about three of Jesus's miracles. They manage to save a few souls (The Miracle Song). Then, Abraham sings his song, claiming that it doesn't matter who you are, but that you belong in God's family nonetheless (Everybody Fits).

Once the song is through, Matthew and the Boyz read scripted confessions, supposedly from the audience. The last of the confessions is from Larry, whose girlfriend has been pressuring him to lose his virginity. Luke and Matthew are against Larry having premarital sex. Matthew sings a love song based on abstinence, bringing up a real audience member onstage, while Mark swoons, mistaking the song to be about him (Something About You). Matthew gives a souvenir to the audience member, a towelette, that is taken by Mark as she is led off the stage. Luke, fed up with Mark's jealousy, pleads for the Boyz, as well as the audience, to focus on their souls, as he has been working on his (Body, Mind, and Soul).

The soul sensor goes down to thirty-three. Matthew declares a surprise party for Juan and gives him a very special letter addressed to him. The letter states that they have finally found Juan's parents, but said parents are no longer alive, and were found at a cemetery. The Boyz try to continue the set list like normal, but Juan begins to cry and grieves his family. Abraham takes his place in singing his big song, but gives up on the dance break and attempts to search for Juan, who has run away and is trying to leave the theater. When the Boyz get him back, he regains his confidence and continues his song with pride (La Vida Eternal).

There are ten people left whose souls still need to be saved. To save them, Mark shares his story with Episcopalian bullies, who bullied him for his voice and his stylistic choices. Out of the blue, Matthew comes in to defend him from the bullies. Mark, smitten, calls him his guardian angel. This was his Catholic awakening (Epiphany). This has saved six souls, but there are still four left in the audience.

The Altar Boyz try to save those four whose souls are still lost with a song that they have never performed before, and only perform in extreme circumstances. In the song, they try desperately to help, in any way possible, to save the audience (Number 918). This does not work. As Luke tries for an encore, Matthew stops the Boyz, and shamefully admits that he has signed a solo deal, and will be leaving the band. One by one, each boy admits that they will also be leaving the band after this performance, except for Abraham, who rejected the deal he was offered. Now, he understands why he's in the band. Abraham gives his finally complete song to the band. One by one, each boy enters the song, and they sing together for one last time, promising that they will always be friends, and there's a reason why they're here (I Believe).

== Production history ==
Directed by Stafford Arima and choreographed by Christopher Gattelli, Altar Boyz debuted at the 47th Street Theatre (The Puerto Rican Traveling Theatre) in New York City as part of the New York Musical Theatre Festival in September 2004. The NYMF cast included Cheyenne Jackson as Matthew, Tyler Maynard as Mark, Andy Karl as Luke, Ryan Duncan as Juan, and David Josefsberg as Abraham. Marc Kudisch performed the pre-recorded role of "G.O.D." Due to the nature of the festival, the NYMF run was limited to eight performances on an irregular schedule over the course of a few weeks.

After 16 preview performances, the show opened Off Broadway at Stage 4 of Dodger Stages (now New World Stages) on March 1, 2005. The cast was the same as in the NYMF production, except Scott Porter played the part of Matthew and Shadoe Stevens played the pre-recorded role of "G.O.D." The production closed on January 10, 2010, after 2,032 regular performances, making it the ninth longest-running Off-Broadway musical of all time.

There have been touring productions of Altar Boyz in the United States (in 2007, 2008 and 2009) and resident productions in Chicago (2007), and South Korea, Hungary, Finland, Australia, the Philippines and Japan as well as numerous regional and amateur productions. In 2013 it was performed as part of the Adelaide Fringe.

In 2020 over thirty actors previously associated with the show filmed a virtual music video of "I Believe" to raise money for The Actors Fund.

== Characters ==
- Matthew: The leader of the band, who believes in sexual abstinence. First tenor of the group.
- Mark: The sensitive choreographer of the band, who has a crush on Matthew, but is closeted. Countertenor of the group.
- Luke: The bad boy of the band that drives the tour bus, who has had problems with communion wine and dropped out of school. Bass of the group.
- Juan: The Latin lover of the band that picks out the clothes, who is searching for his parents. Second tenor of the group.
- Abraham: The gefilte fish out of water who is also the songwriter. He is Jewish and isn't exactly sure why he's in a Catholic band. Baritone of the group.

== Cast ==
	NYMF (2004)	Off-Broadway (2005)	Off-Broadway Closing Cast
Matthew	Cheyenne Jackson	Scott Porter	Michael Kadin Craig
Mark	Tyler Maynard		Travis Nesbitt
Luke	Andy Karl		Lee Markham
Juan	Ryan Duncan		Mauricio Pérez
Abraham	David Josefsberg		Ravi Roth

== Songs ==
Songs performed by the ensemble, with a song to spotlight each group member.

- "We Are the Altar Boyz"
- "Rhythm In Me"
- "Church Rulez"
- "The Calling"
- "The Miracle Song"
- "Everybody Fits" - Abraham & Boyz
- "Something About You" - Matthew & Boyz
- "Body, Mind & Soul" - Luke & Boyz
- "La Vida Eternal" - Juan & Boyz
- "Epiphany" - Mark & Boyz
- "Number 918"
- Finale: "I Believe"
- Bows: "Altar Boyz Remix"

== Awards and nominations ==
- Outer Critics Circle Award Best Off Broadway Musical (winner)
- Drama Desk Award Outstanding Musical (nominee)
- Drama Desk Award Outstanding Featured Actor in a Musical (Tyler Maynard, nominee)
- Drama Desk Award Outstanding Choreography (Christopher Gattelli, nominee)
- Drama Desk Award Outstanding Music (Gary Adler & Michael Patrick Walker, nominees)
- Drama Desk Award Outstanding Lyrics (Gary Adler & Michael Patrick Walker, nominees)
- Drama Desk Award Outstanding Book of a Musical (Kevin Del Aguila, nominee)
- Drama Desk Award Outstanding Orchestrations (Doug Katsaros & Lynne Shankel, nominees)
- Lucille Lortel Award Outstanding Musical (nominee)
- Lucille Lortel Award Outstanding Choreography (Christopher Gattelli, winner)
- Lucille Lortel Award Outstanding Featured Actor (Tyler Maynard, nominee)
- Lucille Lortel Award Outstanding Sound Design (Simon Matthews, nominee)
- Drama League Award Distinguished Production of a Musical (nominee)
- Drama League Award Distinguished Performance Award (Ryan Duncan, David Josefsberg, Andy Karl, Tyler Maynard, Scott Porter, nominees)
- Theatre World Award (Tyler Maynard, winner)

== Cast recording ==
Altar Boyz was recorded in March 2005 and was released on May 17, 2005, by Ghostlight Records (an imprint of Sh-K-Boom Records).
