= The Pizza Underground =

American comedy rock band

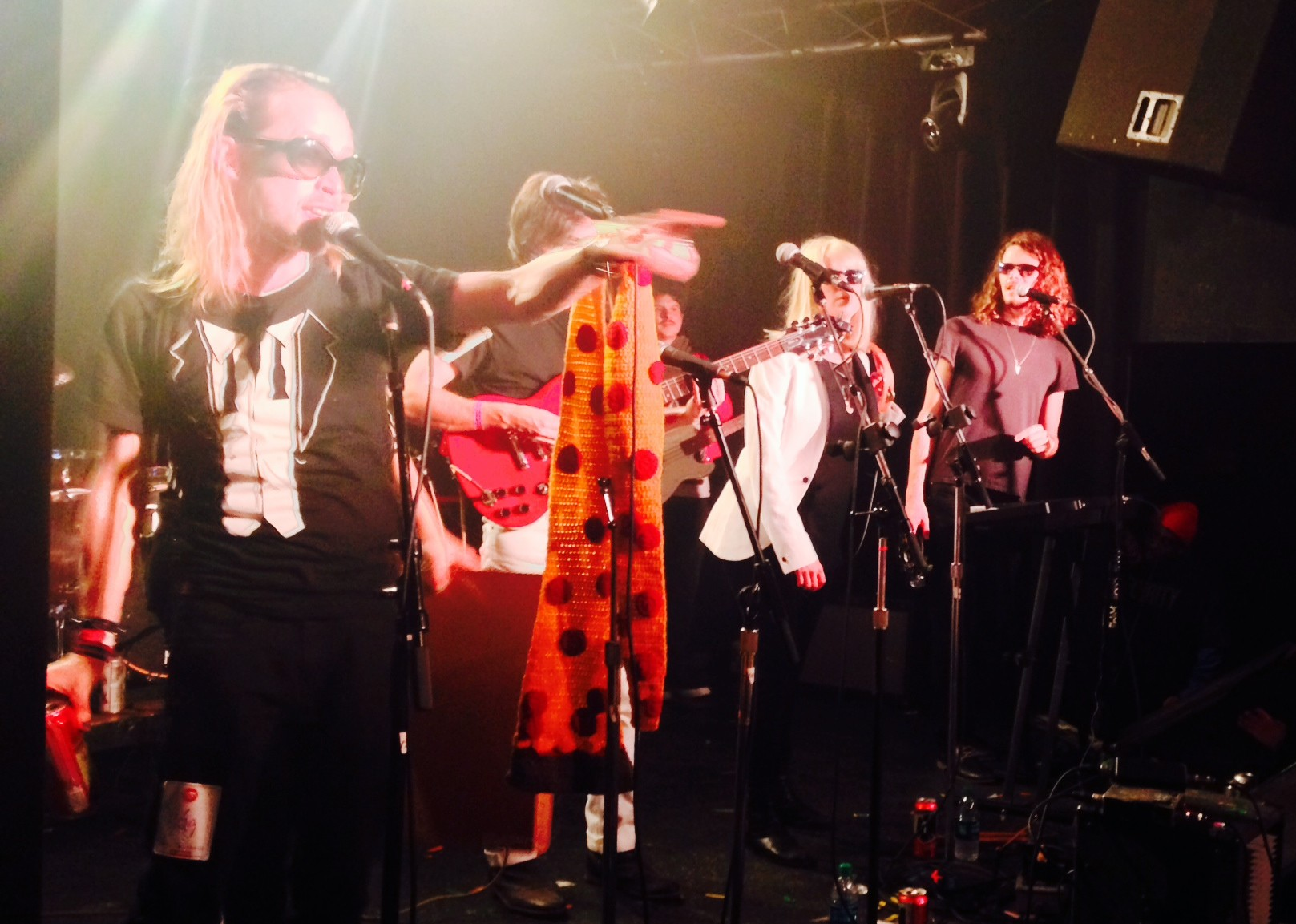
- The Pizza Underground performing in Chicago in 2014

Background information
- Origin: New York City
- Genres: Comedy rock; anti-folk
- Years active: 2013–2018
- Past members: Macaulay Culkin; Corey McCracklins; Matt Colbourn; Phoebe Kreutz; Deenah Vollmer; Austin Kilham
- Website: thepizzaunderground.tumblr.com

The Pizza Underground was an American comedy rock band based in New York City. Mainly parodying songs by the Velvet Underground with pizza-themed song names and lyrics, the group consisted of Macaulay Culkin (kazoo, percussion and vocals) along with Matt Colbourn (guitar, vocals), Phoebe Kreutz (glockenspiel, vocals), Deenah Vollmer (pizza box, vocals) and Austin Kilham (tambourine, vocals). Because of the theme, the band gave out boxed pizzas to people who attended their live performances.

== History ==
Deenah Vollmer, the group's "pizza box" percussionist, said the idea for the Pizza Underground began as a joke in 2012. "We soon realized you can replace most any word with slice or cheese," she told The Philadelphia Inquirer. Glockenspiel player Phoebe Kreutz stated they believed the Velvet Underground songs were written about pizza, but had to be reworded to accommodate the "standards of their day."

On November 11, 2013, the group recorded a live demo at Macaulay Culkin's apartment. That same month they performed a Lou Reed tribute show at the Sidewalk Cafe in the East Village. In December, a viral video of Culkin eating a cheese pizza was uploaded to YouTube. He was parodying Andy Warhol consuming a Burger King Whopper in Jørgen Leth's documentary 66 Scenes from America. Culkin was promoting the debut of the Pizza Underground.

The group released its first music video in January 2014, parodying various Velvet Underground songs such as "All Pizza Parties" ("All Tomorrow's Parties"), "Pizza Gal" ("Femme Fatale") and "Take a Bite of the Wild Slice" (Lou Reed's "Walk on the Wild Side"). The video featured the group performing on a bed of pizza boxes, surrounded by pizza checkered walls, with members of the group wearing slices of pizza as masks. Also in 2014, the cassette of the demo was released by Bitter Melody Records on yellow, white, and red cassettes. An 18-show North American tour entitled Fresh to Your Door took place that same year.

In May 2014, the band was booed off the stage at the Rock City venue in Nottingham, England, while performing at the Dot to Dot Festival. A spectator later complained that the parody group were making a "mockery of one of the greatest bands of all time". The band quit playing within 15 minutes, and in response to having pints of beer thrown at the band, frontman Macaulay Culkin complained to the crowd, "Why are you throwing those? ...I'd rather drink them!"

The initial cassette release was followed by Live at Chop Suey, also on Bitter Melody Records, recorded at the Chop Suey in Seattle, Washington.

In January 2018, Culkin revealed during an interview on the WTF with Marc Maron podcast that the Pizza Underground had broken up.
