= Brad Alexander =

American songwriter and composer (born 1971)

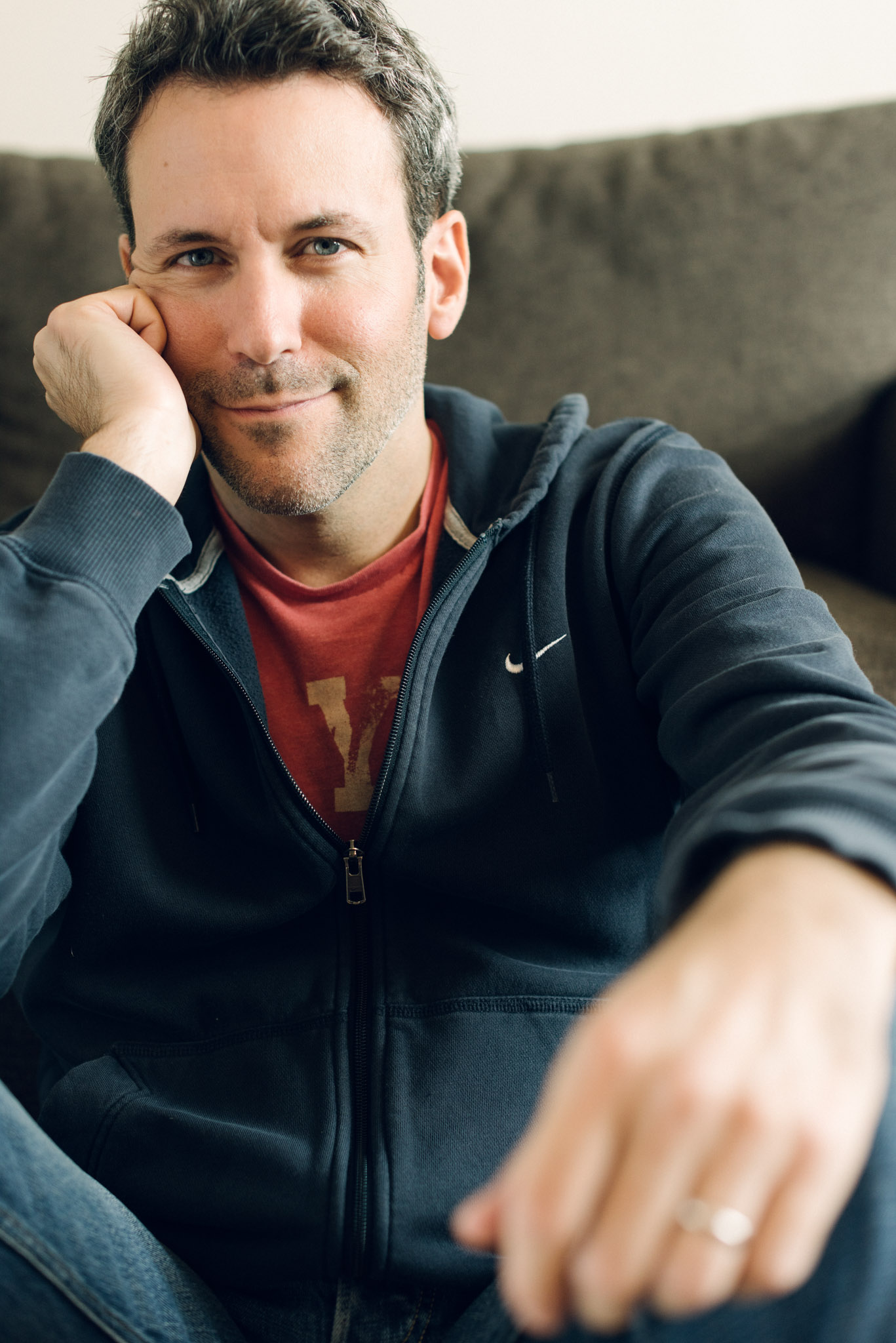

Background information
- Born: February 2, 1971 (age 55); New York, United States
- Genres: Musical theater, Pop, Rock, Country
- Occupations: Composer, songwriter
- Years active: 1993–present
- Website: bradalexander.com

Brad Alexander (born February 2, 1971) is an American composer for television and musical theater. He was the lead composer for the 2019–2021 animated series Clifford the Big Red Dog (Scholastic/PBS Kids/Amazon) and wrote the music for See Rock City & Other Destinations, which won the 2011 Drama Desk Award for Outstanding Book of a Musical, the Richard Rodgers Award and the BMI Foundation's Jerry Bock Award. He wrote the music for TheatreWorksUSA's Dog Man: The Musical, which premiered off-Broadway at the Lucille Lortel Theater and toured the US and Canada from 2019–2020. He also wrote the music and orchestrations for Click, Clack, Moo, which premiered Off-Broadway at the Lucille Lortel Theater and received a nomination for the Drama Desk Award for Outstanding Lyrics and Lucille Lortel Award nominations for Outstanding Choreographer, Outstanding Lyrics and Outstanding Musical. His songs have been featured on Sony Records, Select Records, Showtime's The L Word, VH1's Celebreality campaign, Sirius XM Radio and the web series Submissions Only. He is a member of the Songwriters Hall of Fame, National Alliance for Musical Theatre, Dramatists Guild of America and member emeritus of The BMI Lehman Engel Musical Theatre Workshop. He is married to actress and writer Jill Abramovitz.

== Early career ==
Alexander's first professional writing job was at the Berkshire Theatre Festival, where he spent two summers penning over 40 songs for its acclaimed Children's Theatre Under the Tent. As a music producer at advertising agency Young & Rubicam in New York City, Alexander supervised the music and sound design for national broadcast campaigns for Campbell's, Kraft, Fisher-Price, Barbie and the Ad Council. He later left the corporate world to perform as a pianist and singer, playing solo and dueling piano shows in New York City and throughout the East Coast for over a decade, learning thousands of songs and becoming intimately familiar with song structure.

== Works ==
- Clifford The Big Red Dog (Scholastic/PBSKids/Amazon) - Lead composer.
- Peg + Cat (PBSKids/Amazon) - Composed music for five episodes.
- Dog Man: The Musical (book and lyrics by Kevin Del Aguila; based on the books by Dav Pilkey; directed by Jen Wineman)
- Click Clack Moo (lyrics by Kevin Del Aguila; book by Billy Aronson; directed by John Rando)
- Duck for President & Other Story Books ("Duck for President" and "I Have to Go") (book, lyrics and direction by Kevin Del Aguila)
- Eleven (book by Rachel Axler; lyrics by Jimmy McNicholas; directed by Jim Krueger)
- If You Give a Pig a Pancake & Other Story Books ("Lily's Big Day") (book, lyrics and direction by Kevin Del Aguila)
- Just So Stories (book by Mindi Dickstein; lyrics by Helen Chayefsky; directed by David Schechter)
- Martha Speaks (book by Kevin Del Aguila; lyrics by Jill Abramovitz; directed by Devanand Janki)
- The Living End ("The Ransom of Red Chief") (book by Brad Alexander and Helen Chayefsky; lyrics by Helen Chayefsky; directed by Cheryl Denson)
- See Rock City & Other Destinations (book and lyrics by Adam Mathias; New York premiere at The Duke on 42nd Street directed by Jack Cummings III; world premiere at Barrington Stage Company directed by Kevin Del Aguila)
- We the People: America Rocks! ("King of the Ring") (lyrics by Kevin Del Aguila; book by Joe Iconis; directed by Gordon Greenberg)

== Awards and honors ==
- 2020 Off-Broadway Alliance Award nomination for Best Family Musical (Dog Man: The Musical)
- 2011 Drama Desk Award nomination for Outstanding Music (See Rock City & Other Destinations)
- 2011 Lucille Lortel Award nomination for Outstanding Musical (We the People: America Rocks!)
- 2010 Lucille Lortel Award nomination for Outstanding Musical (Click, Clack, Moo)
- 2008 Richard Rodgers Award for Musical Theatre from The American Academy of Arts and Letters (See Rock City & Other Destinations)
- 2007 Jerry Bock Award from The BMI Foundation (See Rock City & Other Destinations)
