= Dog Man: The Musical =

- Music: Brad Alexander
- Lyrics: Kevin Del Aguila
- Book: Kevin Del Aguila
- Basis: Dog Man by Dav Pilkey
- Premiere: July 28, 2019: Lucille Lortel Theatre, New York City.

Dog Man: The Musical is a 2019 superhero comedy musical based on the Dog Man series of graphic novels by writer Dav Pilkey. It was created by TheatreWorksUSA.

== History ==
Dog Man was developed as an Off-Broadway show, that first aired in the summer of 2019, by nonprofit TheatreWorksUSA. Its premiere was at the Lucille Lortel Theatre, set from June 28 to August 4. The production's run was later extended through August 11.

The 2025–2026 American national tour of the musical launched on September 27 at the Byham Theatre in Pittsburgh, PA.

The musical received its European premiere at the Southbank Centre in July 2026.

== Musical numbers ==
- "Underture" – Orchestra
- "The Opening Number" – George, Harold, Petey, Company
- "Dog Man" – Nurse, Dr. Dookie, Surgeon, Chief, Dog Man, Petey, Flippy, Company
- "Revenge" – George, Petey, Big Jim, Prison Guard, Delivery Man, Li'l Petey
- "Cyber-Fish" – Nurse, Dr. Dookie, Sarah Hatoff
- "Happy Song / 80-Hd" – Li'l Petey, Petey
- "The Perfect Mashup" – George, Harold, Li'l Petey, Dog Man, Man with Pink Beard
- "Without Me" – Petey, Li'l Petey, Company
- "I'm Back" – Flippy, Beasty Buildings #1 and #2
- "The Evil Abc's" – Petey, Li'l Petey
- "Robo-Dance Party" – Li'l Petey, Petey, Company
- "Dog Man Is Go!" – George, Harold, Flippy, Dog Man, Beasty Buildings #1 and #2, Chief, Li'l Petey, Petey, Company
- "A Far, Far Better Thing" – Li'l Petey, Petey, Chief
- "A Far, Far Better Reprise" – Li'l Petey, Flippy, Chief, Petey, Steve, Dog Man, Company
- "The Happy Ending" – Li'l Petey, Flippy, Chief, Petey, George, Harold, Dog Man, Company
- "Bows" – Orchestra

== Characters and original cast ==
Character(s)	Original Off-Broadway Production (2019)
Dog Man, Officer Knight, Greg the Dog	Brian Owen
Li'l Petey, Nurse, Citizen, Beasty Building #1, 80-HD, Milly	L.R. Davidson
Petey, Man with Pink Beard	Jamie LaVerdiere
Flippy, Sarah Hatoff, Zuzu, Citizen	Crystal Sha'nae
Chief, George Beard, Surgeon, Citizen, Beasty Building #2, Big Jim	Forest VanDyke
Harold Hutchins, Dr. Dookie, Steve, Dumb Kid, Citizen, Delivery Man, Prison Guard, Beasty Building #3	Dan Rosales
Ensemble/Understudy	Kadrea Dawkins (understudy for Li'l Petey and Flippy)
Ensemble/Understudy	Milo J. Marami (understudy for Dog Man, Chief, Petey, and Harold Hutchins)

== Reception ==
In a review of the play for The New York Times, Laurel Graeber praised the show as a "family show that makes adults laugh, too", highlighting the direction, choreography, design and score.
