= Ann Harada =

American actress and singer

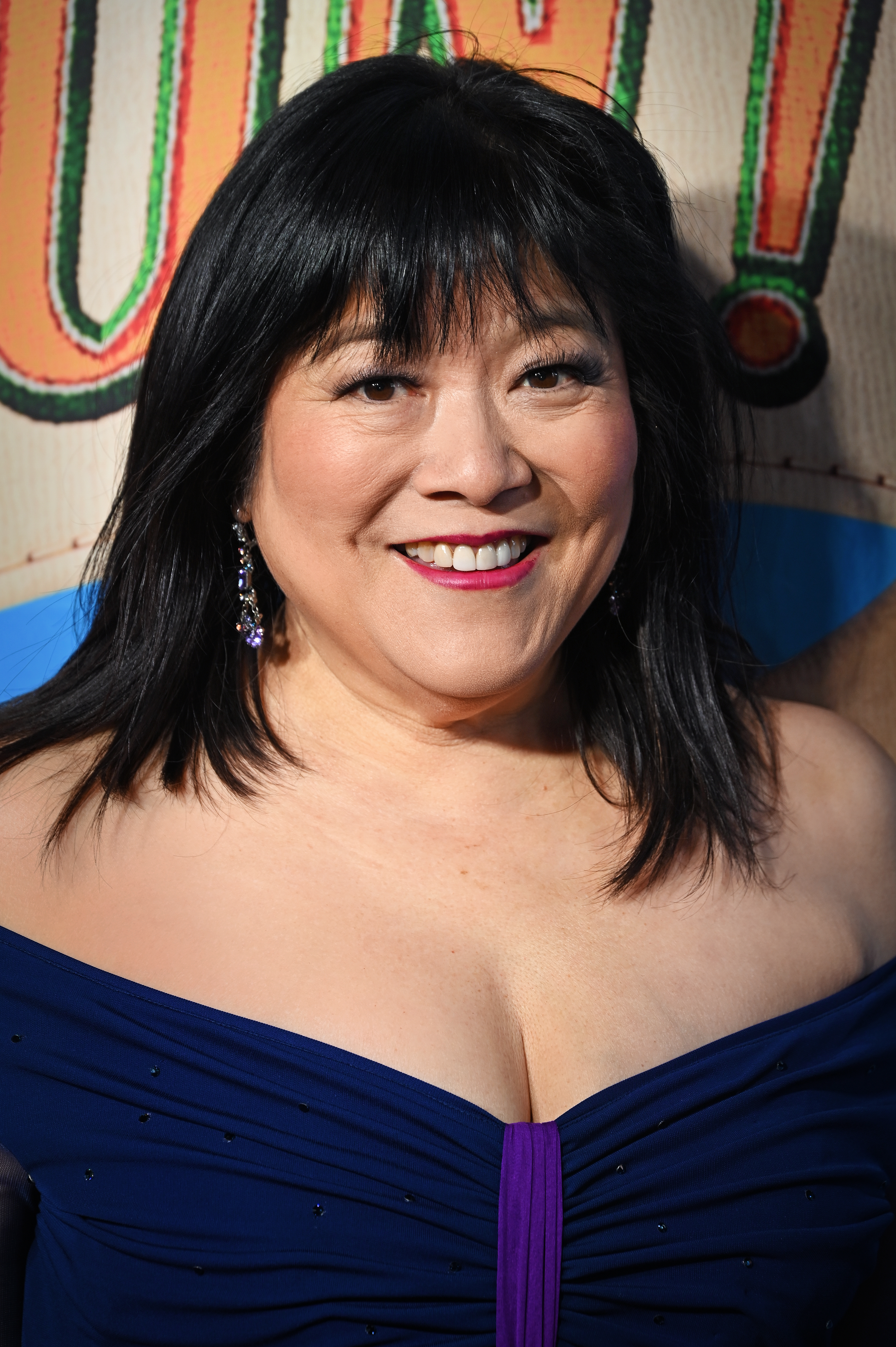
- Harada in 2026
- Born: Ann Chiemi Harada; February 3, 1964 (age 62); Honolulu, Hawaii, U.S.
- Education: Brown University
- Occupations: Actress, singer
- Years active: 1987–present
- Spouse: Peter Litman (m. 1997)
- Children: 1

Ann Chiemi Harada (born February 3, 1964) is an American actress and singer. She is primarily known for work on the Broadway stage, having originated the roles of Christmas Eve in Avenue Q and Charlotte in the Broadway production of Rodgers & Hammerstein's Cinderella.

Harada also had a starring role in the Apple TV+ musical comedy series Schmigadoon! (2021–2023), with her later reprising and originating the role of Florence Menlove for the show's stage adaptation in 2025.

== Early life ==
Harada was born and raised in Honolulu, Hawaii. She attended the Punahou School and was active in theatre in high school. After college at Brown University, she moved to New York City and worked with producer Suzanne Schwartz. She performed with the New York City Gay Men's Chorus, did cabaret, and appeared in the Broadway production of M. Butterfly.

== Career ==
Harada earned her Equity card in 1987 when she was cast in Maury Yeston and Larry Gelbart's 1,2,3,4,5 at Manhattan Theatre Club. She is a member of the Vineyard Theatre's Community of Artists and appeared in four original musicals there, including Hit the Lights!.

In 1998, Harada starred in the National Asian American Theatre Company's production of Falsettoland. Peter Marks of The New York Times described her rendition of "Holding to the Ground" as a "full-throttle success." Also in 1998, Harada had a small part in the Todd Solondz film Happiness.

Harada was in the original Broadway company of Seussical in 2000. She had also been in its first workshop and all of the pre-Broadway iterations of the show.

=== Avenue Q ===
Harada got involved in Avenue Q starting with the first performance of the show at the York Theatre in 2000. Lyricist Amanda Green had recommended Harada to Avenue Q writers Robert Lopez and Jeff Marx. Harada opened Avenue Q at the Vineyard Theatre in New York in March 2003 and moved with the show to Broadway that July. She took a break for parental leave in late 2004, returning in early 2005. Harada left the Broadway company of Avenue Q on 26 February 2006. In June 2006, she opened the London production of Avenue Q at the Noël Coward Theatre in the West End. She played her last performance on 18 November 2006. She is the only actor who played the role of Christmas Eve in both the Broadway and West End productions of Avenue Q.

About her performance in the Broadway production, Ben Brantley wrote in The New York Times: "[S]he deliver[s], in the show's wittiest coup de théâtre, a full-throated ballad in the manner of a 1950's musical diva...in a shivery, rafters-shaking alto." Hilton Als of The New Yorker called her "a funny girl who can sing, act, and let the audience in on the joke all at the same time."

On July 6, 2009, Harada returned as part of the final Broadway cast of Avenue Q. The show closed on September 13, 2009.

In 2009, Harada reprised the character of Christmas Eve for a series of one-night-only benefits for Broadway Cares/Equity Fights AIDS originally entitled Christmas Eve with Christmas Eve, singing reinterpretations of duets with Broadway leading men. The fifth edition on December 14, 2015, was renamed Christmas Eve's Holiday Hunkfest. The final edition of Hunkfest was on December 14, 2016.

=== 2000s ===
On April 24, 2007, Harada joined the Broadway company of Les Misérables playing Madame Thénardier; she replaced Jenny Galloway. Harada left Les Misérables on October 30, 2007, being replaced by Galloway.

Harada was featured Wes Anderson-directed commercials for AT&T.

Harada was a guest on John Tartaglia's television show Johnny and the Sprites, singing the Laurence O'Keefe song "Everything Must Go" on an episode entitled "The Sprites Save Grotto's Grove". It premiered on the Disney Channel on 22 March 2008.

Harada was in The Muny's production of High School Musical on Stage! in 2008, playing the drama teacher Ms. Darbus and the science teacher Ms. Tenny.

She was in the original cast of 9 to 5 as Kathy and in the ensemble through June 21, 2009. She left to return to the cast of Avenue Q.

=== 2010s ===
In May 2011, she played the role of Annette in a production of God of Carnage at George Street Playhouse.

Her recording of "A Last Confession" on Steve Marzullo's album Show Some Beauty was a featured in USA Today in June 2011.

She appeared as Linda the stage manager in eighteen episodes of NBC's Smash.

From January 2013 to December 2014, she appeared in the original Broadway production of Cinderella as the stepsister Charlotte. In its review of the show, Variety said that Harada gives "a hoot of a perf."

Harada was the star of her own installment of the 2014 American Songbook series at Jazz at Lincoln Center's Allen Room in New York City on 22 February 2014.

Harada was in the original cast of the musical Brooklynite, which opened its world premiere run at the Vineyard Theatre in New York on 25 February 2015.

On 8 June 2015, in a one-night-only concert of Bombshell, Smash's show-within-the show, Harada reprised her role as Linda and performed "I Never Met a Wolf Who Didn't Love to Howl".

In June 2016, Harada appeared as Maggie Jones in The Muny's production of 42nd Street and in its production of Mamma Mia! in July.

In October 2016, Harada appeared as Stacey in The Women's Project's world premiere of Stuffed, a new play by Lisa Lampanelli.

The Wall Street Journal wrote that "Ann Harada is especially good in the unlikely-sounding triple role of the Emperor of Japan, a French admiral and a whorehouse madam" in John Doyle's staging of Pacific Overtures, which opened at Classic Stage Company on 4 May 2017 and ran through 18 June 2017.

Harada was in the world premiere of the musical The New World at Bucks County Playhouse in October, 2017 and "br[ought] down the house."

In the March 2019 Encores! production of I Married an Angel, "[i]n a relatively insignificant role, Ann Harada manage[d] to steal the show at the end with the perfectly hilarious delivery of a single line."

=== 2020s ===
In early 2020, Harada played Pile of Poo in the musical Emojiland.

On April 26, 2020, Harada rejoined three of her Pacific Overtures castmates for Take Me to the World: A Sondheim 90th Birthday Celebration on Broadway.com in a split-screen video version of the song "Someone in a Tree". Wesley Morris, writing in The New York Times, described it as "pure magic" and named it one of the best performances of 2020. Take Me to the World won the 2021 Drama League Award for Outstanding Digital Concert Production.

In October 2020, Harada was announced in the cast of the musical show Schmigadoon! Harada plays Florence Menlove, the wife of the Mayor; she sings "He's a Queer One, That Man o' Mine" in the series' third episode.

In May 2022, Harada played Jack's Mother in the Encores! production of Into the Woods. In The New York Times Critic's Pick review of the production, she was described as a "comic genius." She reprised the role in the Broadway revival beginning September 27, 2022, when she replaced Aymee Garcia in the part.

In a well-received June 2023 production at The Muny of Beauty and the Beast, she played Mrs. Potts. In November 2023, Harada originated the role of Myra Babbitt in the acclaimed world premiere of Babbitt at La Jolla Playhouse.

In June 2024, Harada was "brightly amusing" in the American premiere of Lucy Kirkwood's The Welkin at the Atlantic Theater Company.

In February 2025, Harada reprised her role as Florence Menlove in the world premiere of Schmigadoon! as a stage musical at the John F. Kennedy Center for the Performing Arts. She transferred with the production when it opened on Broadway in April 2026.

== Stage credits ==
=== Broadway ===
Year	Title	Role	Theater
1989–90	M. Butterfly	Comrade Chin	Eugene O'Neill Theatre
2000–01	Seussical	Marshal of the Court	Richard Rodgers Theatre
2003–05	Avenue Q	Christmas Eve	Golden Theatre
2006–07	Les Misérables	Madame Thénardier	Broadhurst Theatre
2009	9 to 5	Kathy	Marquis Theatre
2009	Avenue Q	Christmas Eve	Golden Theatre
2013–14	Cinderella	Charlotte	Broadway Theatre
2022–23	Into the Woods	Jack's Mother	St. James Theatre
2026	Schmigadoon!	Florence Menlove	Nederlander Theatre

=== Other stage credits ===
Year	Title	Role	Theater	Notes
1998	Falsettoland	Trina	National Asian American Theatre Company	
2000	The Moment When	Waitress	Playwrights Horizons	World premiere
2006	Avenue Q	Christmas Eve	Noël Coward Theatre	UK premiere
2008	High School Musical	Ms. Darbus/Ms. Tenny	The Muny	
2010	The Kid	Ruth / Others	The New Group	World premiere
2011	God of Carnage	Annette	George Street Playhouse	
2015	Brooklynite	Professor Whitman	Vineyard Theatre	World premiere
2016	42nd Street	Maggie Jones	The Muny	
2016	Mamma Mia!	Rosie	The Muny	
2016	Stuffed	Stacey	The Women's Project	World premiere
2017	Pacific Overtures	Madam/French Admiral/Emperor of Japan	Classic Stage Company	
2017	The New World	Hyannis, the Indian Chief	Bucks County Playhouse	World premiere
2018	The Nerd	Clelia	George Street Playhouse	
2018	Gypsy	Electra	The Muny	
2018	Holiday Inn	Louise	Paper Mill Playhouse	
2018	The Closet	Brenda Mishima	Williamstown Theatre Festival	World premiere
2019	I Married an Angel	Duchess of Holstein-Kuloff	Encores!	
2019	Dropping Gumballs on Luke Wilson	Alice	The Working Theater	World premiere
2019	Matilda	Mrs. Wormwood	The Muny	
2019	South Pacific	Bloody Mary	Aspen Music Festival	
2020	Emojiland	Pile of Poo	Duke Theater	
2021	Fairycakes	Mustardseed	Greenwich House Theater	World premiere
2022	Into the Woods	Jack's Mother	New York City Center	Encores!
2023	Dear World	Gabrielle	New York City Center	Encores!
2023	Beauty and the Beast	Mrs. Potts	The Muny	
2023	Babbitt	Myra Babbitt	La Jolla Playhouse	World premiere
2024	The Welkin	Judith Brewer	Atlantic Theater Company	US premiere
2024	Anything Goes	Evangeline Harcourt	The Muny	
2024	Babbitt	Myra Babbitt	Shakespeare Theatre Company	
2025	Schmigadoon!	Florence Menlove	Kennedy Center	World premiere
2025	The Counterfeit Opera	Mrs. Peachum	The Amph at Little Island	World premiere

== Filmography ==
=== Film ===
Year	Title	Role	Notes
1997	Hudson River Blues	Robin	
1998	Happiness	Kay	
2004	Marmalade	Asian Woman	
2005	All American Eyes	Ann	Short film
2006	Feel	Hiroko	
2011	The Art of Getting By	Mrs. Dougherty	
2011	Smile	Ruth	Short film
2012	Hope Springs	Ann, The Happy Wife	
2013	Admission	Mrs. Lafont	
2015	Sisters	Jean	
2016	Youth in Oregon	Compassionate Aide	
2019	No One Called Ahead	Angel	Direct-to-video
2022	Jerry & Marge Go Large	Shirley	
2022	Disenchanted	Sardonic Businesswoman/Florist	

=== Television ===
Year	Title	Role	Notes
2012-2013	Smash	Linda	18 episodes
2021-2023	Schmigadoon!	Florence Menlove, Madam Frau	
2024	Moon Girl and Devil Dinosaur	Matsuye (voice)	2 episodes
2026	Elsbeth	Trudy	Episode: "Murder Six Across"

== Awards and nominations ==
Year	Award Show	Award	Work	Result
1998	National Board of Review	USA Best Acting in an Ensemble	Happiness	Won
2004	Broadway.com Audience Choice Award	Favorite Featured Actress in a Musical	Avenue Q	Won
2004	Outer Critics Circle Award	Special Award for Outstanding Ensemble Performance and Puppet Artistry	Avenue Q	Won
2007	WhatsOnStage Award	Best Ensemble Performance	Avenue Q	Won
2013	Broadway.com Audience Choice Award	Favorite Funny Performance	Cinderella	Nominated
