= Cat Kid Comic Club =

American children's graphic novel series

- Cat Kid Comic Club (2020); Cat Kid Comic Club: Perspectives (2021); Cat Kid Comic Club: On Purpose (2022); Cat Kid Comic Club: Collaborations (2022); Cat Kid Comic Club: Influencers (2023); Cat Kid Comic Club: Selfies (TBA)
- Author: Dav Pilkey
- Illustrator: Dav Pilkey
- Language: English
- Genre: Children's Literature; Comedy
- Publisher: Scholastic
- No. of books: 5 (+ 1 Upcoming)

Cat Kid Comic Club is a children's graphic novel series by author and illustrator Dav Pilkey. It serves as a spinoff to the Dog Man series of books, which itself is a spinoff in the Captain Underpants series.

== Plot ==
The series stars Li'l Petey (also known as Cat Kid), his friend Molly the tadpole, Molly's 21 frog siblings, and the frog siblings' adoptive father Flippy the Fish, as they create comic books and other projects. There are multiple art techniques used in the comic books they make.

== Books ==
Cat Kid Comic Club has a total of five books (and one upcoming book), all of which follow Li'l Petey, Flippy, Molly and her 21 frog siblings creating comics and other projects:

1. Cat Kid Comic Club (2020)
2. Cat Kid Comic Club: Perspectives (2021)
3. Cat Kid Comic Club: On Purpose (2022)
4. Cat Kid Comic Club: Collaborations (2022)
5. Cat Kid Comic Club: Influencers (2023)
6. Cat Kid Comic Club: Selfies (TBA)

== Theatre adaptation ==
In 2023, an adaptation of Cat Kid Comic Club, created by TheatreWorksUSA, premiered as an Off-Broadway show. The National Tour of Cat Kid Comic Club starred Samy Cordero as the titular character.

== Reception ==
According to the New York Times Graphic Novel Bestseller list, Cat Kid Comic Club topped the best seller list in 2020. It sold more than 4.5 million copies in North America in 2020, according to Scholastic. A review of Marissa Moss of the first book was positive, saying "This quickly devoured comic is more than a fun story. It's full of useful tips about how to write and draw and gives examples of the wide variety of stories the graphic format allow."
