= Gary Adler =

American composer and musical director

- Origin: New York City, New York, U.S.
- Education: University of Michigan
- Genres: Musical theatre
- Occupations: Composer, musical director

Gary Adler is an American composer and musical director based in New York. He received two 2005 Drama Desk nominations (along with Michael Patrick Walker) for his music and lyrics for the off-Broadway show Altar Boyz, which had its premiere in the New York Musical Theatre Festival the year before. As a composer, he has written songs for Disney Channel's Johnny and the Sprites and Dance Dance Revolution, which Les Freres Corbusier presented in December 2008. He is a graduate of the University of Michigan, where he studied under William Bolcom

He has served as the musical director for numerous shows, most notably Avenue Q. His other NYC conducting credits include Chita Rivera: The Dancer's Life, Urinetown, The Fantasticks and Nunsense.
