= Amos Yee =

Singaporean sex offender (born 1998)

- 余澎杉
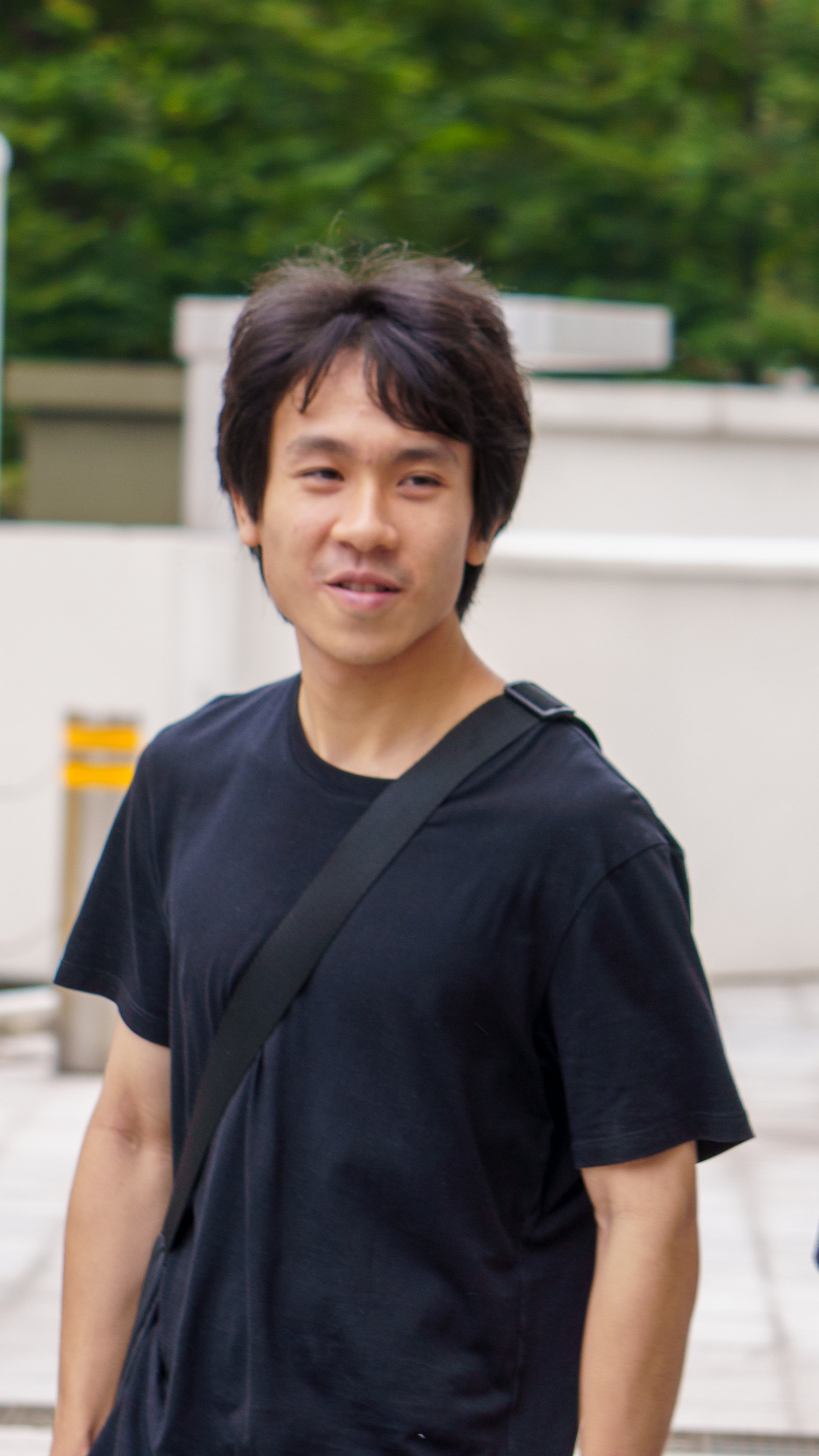
- Yee outside Singapore State Courts in 2026
- Born: Amos Yee Pang Sang; 31 October 1998 (age 28); Singapore
- Education: Pei Chun Public School; Zhonghua Secondary School
- Status: Deported to Singapore; charged under the Enlistment Act
- Convictions: Singapore: Intention of wounding the religious feelings of Christians and Muslims Section 298 of the Penal Code; Obscenity Section 292(1)(a) of the Penal Code; Threatening, abusive or insulting communication; United States: Child pornography
- Penalty: Singapore: 4 weeks' imprisonment (2015); 6 weeks' imprisonment, $2,000 fine (2016); United States: 6 years' imprisonment (2021), released on parole on 20 November 2025

Chinese name
- Traditional Chinese: 余澎杉
- Simplified Chinese: 余澎杉
Transcriptions
Standard Mandarin
- Hanyu Pinyin: Yú Péngshān
Yue: Cantonese
- Jyutping: jyu4 paang1 saam1
Eastern Min
- Fuzhou BUC: Ṳ̀ Pāng-săng
- Website: amosyee.org

Amos Yee Pang Sang (Chinese: 余澎杉; pinyin: Yú Péngshān; born 31 October 1998) is a Singaporean convicted child sex offender, internet personality, and former child actor.

In 2012, Yee began uploading YouTube videos that criticised religion, particularly Islam and Christianity. Yee gained national and international attention in 2015 after the death of Lee Kuan Yew, the first prime minister of Singapore, uploading a video where he labelled Lee a dictator and portrayed Lee as having anal sex with former prime minister of the United Kingdom, Margaret Thatcher. After 32 police reports were filed against Yee, he was arrested by the Singapore Police Force and charged with both obscenity and violations of provisions under the Maintenance of Religious Harmony Act. His trial and arrest garnered condemnation by international organisations like Amnesty International and the Committee to Protect Journalists, which highlighted restrictions on freedom of expression in Singapore.

In 2016, Yee fled to the United States, where he was granted political asylum by the Department of Homeland Security. In 2020, he was arrested by the Marshals Service at his apartment in Chicago for solicitation, possession of child pornography, and child grooming. He was sentenced to six years in a Illinois prison. Yee was released on parole on 7 October 2023, but was rearrested for violating his parole conditions. He was again released under early parole in November 2025. Yee was refouled back to Singapore in March 2026, where he was charged under the Enlistment Act for failing to comply with his compulsory national service obligations in 2016.

== Early life ==
Amos Yee Pang Sang was born on 31 October 1998 in Singapore to mathematics teacher Mary Toh and computer engineer Alphonsus Yee. He studied at Pei Chun Public School and Zhonghua Secondary School. He is bisexual.

Yee was raised Catholic and began attending Mass independently of his family during his first year in secondary school; however, his service as an altar boy was terminated in 2013 after swearing in church. After questioning his confirmation and watching YouTube channels such as The Amazing Atheist, he renounced his faith and became an atheist.

== Acting career ==
From 2011 to 2012, Yee was a child actor. In March 2011, his film Jan won the Best Short Film and Best Actor awards at The New Paper's First Film Fest (FFF). The paper described the film as a "twisted dark comedy" about a girl with cancer. Yee, 13 at the time, made the film in his bedroom and portrayed the four characters. The FFF awarded Yee a video camera and video editing software.

Following the success of Jan, FFF chief judge Jack Neo offered Yee an internship and an audition in We Not Naughty (2012), his film about juvenile delinquency. Neo cast Yee as the lead's younger brother after Yee revised the language in a script given to him. Neo allowed Yee, who had three scenes in the movie, to write his own dialogue.

== YouTube videos ==
By 2012, Yee had begun uploading videos to YouTube aimed at both Singaporean and international youth. In one upload, he called the Chinese New Year an imitation of New Year's Day. Garnering over 150,000 views, The New Paper described Yee's video as "mocking" the origins of the Chinese zodiac, but Yee later clarified that the video was satirical. Yee also uploaded videos concerning topics such as Singapore's then-prohibition of homosexuality, The Hunger Games, Valentine's Day, Boyhood, and his decision to drop out of school "to pursue [his] 'career' as a 17-year-old boy ranting in front of a video camera".

=== Video criticising Lee Kuan Yew and the Singaporean government ===
On 23 March 2015, Lee Kuan Yew, the first prime minister of Singapore, died. Four days later, Yee uploaded a YouTube video titled "Lee Kuan Yew is Finally Dead!", in which he compared Lee with Jesus, describing both as "power-hungry and malicious" individuals who deceived their followers into thinking otherwise. Apart from hoping that Lee would not rest in peace, Yee also said that Lee was a "horrible person", an "awful leader", and a dictator who made his followers believe that he stood for democratic ideals. He further criticised Singapore's taxes for overshadowing the government's spending of money on the public. Lastly, Yee issued a challenge to Lee's son, former prime minister Lee Hsien Loong, stating that he would "oblige to dance with him" if sued by the latter. As of April 2015, the video had been viewed more than 880,000 times.

Before uploading the video, Yee said that he was worried about the legal ramifications, such as the Sedition Act. He told his mother that he was making a video criticising Lee and uploaded it despite her insistence against the upload. Yee also said that his ideas were influenced by meet-ups with members of the Singapore Democratic Party (SDP), one of whom introduced him to Roy Ngerng's blog. In court documents, he also admitted that he had criticised Christianity and Lee to initiate discussions on what he saw as flaws with religion and Singapore. He acknowledged the potential offences but continued posting blogs, saying that he hoped for positive changes resulting from the discussions he drew. Yee continued to criticise the government of Singapore after his arrest; on 9 September 2015, he uploaded a video titled "PAP king manipulators", in which he criticised the governing People's Action Party (PAP). However, the video did not lead to an arrest.

=== Criticism of Islam ===
In response to politician Calvin Cheng's comments on killing the children of terrorists, Yee wrote a post on 27 November 2015 stating, "Oh yes and fuck Islam, and Allah doesn't exist, but say you see a prick from ISIS who wants to kill or has even killed before, don't think that's a scenario where it's alright to kill him." His statement prompted a subsequent police investigation in December 2015 for posting offensive material on his blog. Yee also created a YouTube video series called "Religion Horrors", which contained two videos titled "Refuting Islam with Their Own Quran" and "Responding to the Bullshit of Christians" that criticised the respective religions.

=== Controversy over defending paedophilia ===
In November 2017, while in the United States, Yee uploaded a series of YouTube videos titled "Why Pedophilia Is Alright", "Don't Discriminate Pedophiles", and "Free Speech for the Pedophile". He had previously criticised age of consent legislation, defending the notion that if he had acted on his desires as a 16-year-old to have sex with a 20-year-old, the adult should not be imprisoned as he had "perfectly [consented]". The videos were met with strong backlash, including death threats. As he lacked funds at the time, Yee asked his followers for donations via Facebook, stating that he preferred crowdfunding to working a job that he disliked.

In April 2018, the Toy Association pulled ads from YouTube following a CNN report that they had been appearing on Yee's channel, which was being used to promote paedophilia. YouTube subsequently pulled all ads from Yee's videos and banned him from monetising content. In early May 2018, YouTube terminated Yee's channel for violating community guidelines. In July 2018, Yee's Patreon account was shut down, and in the same year, his WordPress blog, Facebook, and Twitter accounts, were also shut down, after having used them to express pro-paedophilia views. After a 9-month internet hiatus, Yee stated in a September 2019 interview that he had been busy creating pro-paedophilia videos. In August 2020, Yee claimed in a blog post that he had been diagnosed with narcissistic personality disorder while in an American immigrant detention facility, and that he planned on rebranding himself under the name "Polocle".

== Legal issues in Singapore (2015–2016) ==
=== Arrest ===
On 29 March 2015, Yee was arrested on the grounds of intentionally wounding religious or racial feelings, threatening, abusive or insulting communication, and obscenity. 32 police reports were filed against Yee for his 2015 video, while another police report was made against alleged obscene material on Yee's blog, which contained an image titled "Lee Kuan Yew buttfucking Margaret Thatcher". Toh filed a police report on the day of the arrest because she was unable to control his behaviour. This was later reported by Today, which added that, on 5 May, she told the police that she no longer wanted to provide a statement.

=== Charge, bail and remand ===
On 31 March, three charges were read out to Yee in the State Courts of Singapore; the first charge was that his 2015 video violated Section 298 of the Penal Code for containing remarks that deliberately wounded religious feelings. The second charge, which was declared nolle prosequi on 30 April, was that it contained potentially distressing statements concerning Lee, as prohibited by Section 4 of the Protection from Harassment Act 2014. The third charge was under Section 292 of the Penal Code, which concerned the obscene image Yee uploaded on 28 March. Yee was released on a S$20,000 bail and prohibited from posting online content while the case was ongoing.

On 14 April 2015, Yee violated his bail conditions by asking on both his blog and Facebook page for public donations to fund his legal fees; the blog post also linked to the video and image he had uploaded the prior month. Yee was remanded in Changi Prison from 17 to 21 April because no bail was posted, despite the bail amount only requiring a pledge instead of being physically deposited. Yee was eventually released on bail by Vincent Law, a Singaporean Christian family and youth counsellor. Additionally, three lawyers—Alfred Dodwell, Chong Jia Hao, and Ervin Tan—offered to represent Yee pro bono.

On 29 April, Yee flouted his bail conditions again by making two blog posts; the first questioned his bail terms, and the second accused his father of being physically abusive. District Judge Kessler Soh asked him to take the posts down, but Yee refused. Concurrently, the bail amount was raised to S$30,000, and Yee was again remanded. Yee rejected Law's offer to post bail for him again as Yee did not want to be "gagged", leading to Law discharging himself. Yee's lawyers applied for a change in bail amount and conditions on 6 May, claiming that the ban on uploading online information was too wide. Tay Yong Kwang, a judge at the High Court, upheld Yee's bail conditions after he rejected the prosecution's request to reduce the bail amount and exempt him from reporting daily to a police station, contingent on his attendance of psychiatric counselling.

=== Trial ===
Yee was tried as an adult and pleaded not guilty to both charges. The trial was originally scheduled for 7 May 2015, but was postponed to 12 May by Yee's lawyers so that Yee would not spend more time in remand than necessary. The case attracted significant public interest, with over 20 people seen outside Court 7 more than an hour before the hearing was scheduled to begin. Amongst those who attended the trial were Yee's parents, Ngerng, and social activists Andrew Loh and Teo Soh Lung. Law also attended the trial to support Yee and stated that he had never changed his mind about his decision to post Yee's bail.

The proceedings began with the defence arguing that the obscenity of an image was determined by whether or not it was potentially depraving or had a corrupting effect on any person who was exposed to it, and that the prosecution had not provided evidence that the image passes that test. They argued that Section 292, under which Yee was charged, was aimed at "peddlers and purveyors of pornography" and that it is "wholly inapt to describe [any] mischief [...] in this case". The prosecution had argued that Yee's own comments showed his intention to "corrupt and deprave", but the defence countered that a person cannot be convicted ipse dixit. They also argued that the image was not pornographic in nature, as it was not "designed to arouse".

=== Verdict ===
The court found Yee guilty and convicted him of both charges on 12 May 2015. With regards to the obscenity charge, judge Jasvender Kaur said that standards of obscenity differ among countries, and that the courts should decide based on their own standards. Kaur considered the effect that image had on teenagers, and concluded that it met the "strongest possible disapproval and condemnation". With regards to the second charge, Kaur said that Yee's remarks were "clearly derogatory and offensive to Christians". During the court hearing, Yee requested to be jailed instead of going for probation after Kaur found him guilty. The prosecution requested that Yee be given counselling and probation. The court adjourned sentencing pending a probation report for Yee.

Yee's bail was reduced to S$10,000, which his parents paid. The prohibition for him to post online was lifted, with a requirement to remove the offensive YouTube video and the blog post. Yee complied, but made them public again on 21 May. Yee was greeted by numerous bystanders, but said to reporters that he was unsure if he should "celebrate [his] release or mourn [his] sentence." A day before the verdict, dozens had attended a candlelight vigil at Hong Lim Park supporting him.

=== Molestation allegations ===
On 13 May 2015, a day after being released, Yee falsely claimed on Facebook that his former bailor, Law, had molested him. In response, Law told The Online Citizen that he considered charging Yee for defamation if he did not make a public apology. Given that Yee described himself as a "slow writer", he requested that Law give him "about 3 days" to prepare the apology. Upon hearing what Yee had to say, Law decided to drop the investigation. Afterwards, Yee retracted his apology. In a 6,000-word blog post, Yee justified his definition of "molest" by saying it meant "annoy". When asked about the retraction, Law advised against writing about Yee, and said that he was not considering legal action.

=== Sentencing and further remands ===
On 27 May 2015, Yee was called back to court for an urgent hearing as he refused to meet with his assigned probation officer. The prosecution called for a report to assess Yee's suitability for reformative training, arguing that a jail term or a fine would have no rehabilitative effect. On 2 June, Yee was remanded for three weeks, with a report being made to assess his suitability for reformative training. No bail option was offered during said remand. This decision came after Yee rejected probation in favour of a jail term. The prosecution argued that Yee's re-upload of the image and video pertaining to his charges should be taken into account as an indication of his conduct and character. On 23 June, Kaur ordered that Yee again be remanded at the Institute of Mental Health (IMH) for two weeks in response to a report by psychiatrist Munidasa Winslow, who said that Yee possibly had autism. However, he was assessed as not having any mental disorder.

On 5 July, the night before the expected date of his next hearing, Yee was admitted to the accident and emergency department at Changi General Hospital for low blood sugar levels. Yee's lawyer had reported on 12 June that Yee was experiencing suicidal thoughts at the prospect of reformative training. While Yee had been "very courteous and engaged in the process", his stint at the IMH was said to have been "a shock to his system". On 6 July, Yee was sentenced to four weeks in jail; three weeks for wounding the religious feelings of Christians in his Lee Kuan Yew video and the other for the caricature he posted. He was addressed directly by Kaur, who wished that he would reconsider his decision to drop out of school while saying that dropout success stories were rare.

=== Release ===
Yee was released immediately after his sentences were announced as they were backdated to 2 June; he had been in remand for 50 days. He appeared pale and gaunt and kept his head bowed most of the time. In court, Deputy Public Prosecutor Hay Hung Chun noted that Yee understood the severity of his actions. This was in response to IMH child psychiatrist Cai Yiming's report that Yee had admitted to his guilt, as well as the consequences of his actions. Expressing remorse, Hay announced that the prosecution would be asking for one day of imprisonment. Upon his release, Yee began to ask for cash donations. In July 2015, Yee filed an appeal against the conviction and sentence; his lawyer, Dodwell, expressed a willingness to take the case to the High Court.

=== Reactions ===
Many netizens opposed Yee's video, although some defended the right to express his opinions. The fact that it was uploaded during a week of national mourning contributed to potential offence against Singaporeans. Furthermore, many Singaporeans saw Lee Kuan Yew's death as the end of an era marked by significant economic development and racial harmony, while others criticised the severity of his political control, labelling him as autocratic. In an interview with Time, Lee Hsien Loong said that the government and its officials could be criticised, but that freedom of expression had limits.

Yee, along with his views on Lee and religion, was described by Singaporean professor Ronald Chen as a floating signifier and a "symbol of Singapore's progress and associated challenges". Singaporean magazine Today published a piece by an Edwin Teong, who believed that Yee's video was one of several cases representing poor decisions made by Singaporean youths. Meanwhile, Mikha Chan of Free Malaysia Today characterised Yee as a "wannabe intellectual" who often sensationalised topics of discussion, while Grace Fu, then-second minister for foreign affairs, said that the video "crossed the red line on religion". In response to several violent and threatening remarks made against Yee online, the Media Literacy Council and the Singapore Kindness Movement urged netizens to act responsibly and civilly, even when confronted with perceivably offensive opinions.

==== Slapping incident ====
On 30 April 2015, while en route to the state courts for a pre-trial conference, Yee was slapped in the face by Neo Gim Huah, a self-employed middle-aged man who ran away after challenging Yee to sue him. Neo was arrested at 2 a.m. the next day, less than 12 hours after the attack. Neo apologised to Yee and his parents for the assault, saying that he "lost control" and wanted to "teach Yee a lesson". On 11 May, he was sentenced to three weeks' imprisonment for voluntarily causing hurt, longer than the two weeks requested by the prosecution.

=== Criticism of Yee's imprisonment ===
Alongside Yee's video, his arrest, imprisonment, trial and verdict drew international attention and scrutiny from both the media and human rights organisations. Amnesty International called Yee's four-week jail sentence a "dark day for freedom of expression" in Singapore and declared Yee a prisoner of conscience, citing Article 19 of the Universal Declaration of Human Rights, which highlights the principle to freedom of expression. The United Nations Human Rights Office called for his immediate release in line with the Convention on the Rights of the Child. BBC News reported that Yee was among several people who criticised Lee online, but was the only one arrested. Ben Mathis-Lilley of Slate labelled the Singaporeans who reported Yee to the police as "narcs". Phil Robertson of Human Rights Watch criticised the verdict as "publicly punishing" Yee and "intimidating anyone else who might think of doing the same in the future." On the other hand, Abdul Rani Kulup Abdullah, chief of Martabat Jalinan Muhibbah Malaysia, a Malaysian non-governmental organisation which reports insults against the prime minister, supported Yee's arrest; he encouraged Malaysia to follow Singapore's example of implementing strict laws on free speech to prevent supposedly anarchy-causing influential criticism against the government.

The Singaporean government's handling of Yee's case was also criticised by people and organisations within the country; the Association of Women for Action and Research urged the state to be mindful of the consequences of future prosecutions. Politician Goh Meng Seng said that, despite considering Yee rude, he felt that Yee was obligated to defend his rights. Singaporean academic Cherian George, lawyer and former president of the Law Society of Singapore Peter Low, as well as leading rights activists, academics, filmmakers and members of the arts community signed a letter saying that they disapproved of the government's reactions and that facilitating Yee could prevent other Singaporean youths from openly expressing their views. The Committee to Protect Journalists and a petition started by a Christian Singaporean both called for Yee's release, the former of which criticised his arrest as a reminder of the restrictive working conditions in Singaporean journalism.

==== Protests ====
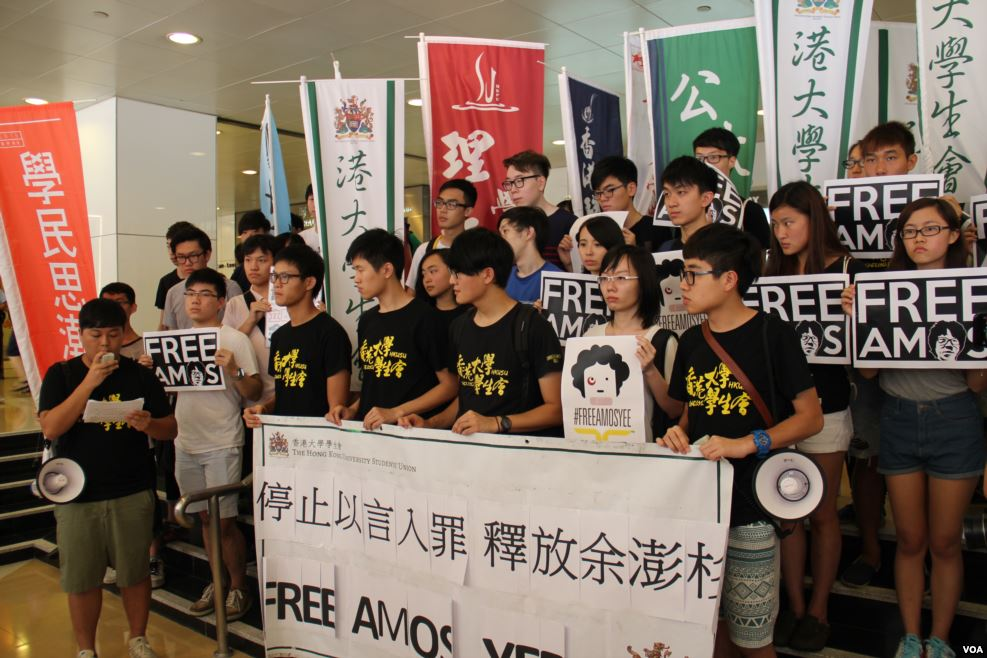
Hong Kong students protesting to release Yee

Yee's sentence led to protests from several activist groups. On 27 June 2015, about 60 people from more than 10 civil society groups under the banner of the Taiwan Association for Human Rights demonstrated outside the Singapore Trade Office in Taipei. The protesters held placards and chanted "Free Amos Yee" for about half an hour. On 30 June, university students in Hong Kong held a protest to urge the Singaporean government to release Yee. Student activist group Scholarism, which took part in the protest, published a post asserting that the actions taken against Yee reflected the lack of freedom of speech within Singaporean society.

On 5 July, a demonstration was held in Hong Kong, where protestors burnt effigies of Lee Hsien Loong and Lee Kuan Yew, to demand the release of Yee. About 50 people from various civic and political groups gathered near the Singapore Consulate in Admiralty with banners and placards, which read "Dissident is not Demented" and "Freedom of Speech should not be infringed". The same day in Singapore, a rally organised by Community Action Network, which advocates for freedom of expression in the country, was attended by an estimated 500 people, demanding the release of Yee.

=== Second trial and sentencing ===
On 11 May 2016, Yee was arrested for allegedly posting content designed to hurt religious feelings and for failing to report to a police station as required by the terms of his probation. He was subsequently released on bail once more. On 17 August, Yee stood trial over six charges for deliberate intent to wound religious feelings and two charges for failure to turn up for police interviews. He was not represented by a lawyer, and seven police officers were summoned as prosecution's witnesses. Before the trial could proceed further, Yee was granted permission to go for Criminal Case Resolution process.

On 29 September 2016, Yee was sentenced to 6 weeks' jail and fined $2,000 for wounding religious feelings. The presiding judge said that Yee posted a photograph and two videos that targeted the feelings of Christians and Muslims, and that Yee's actions should not be tolerated since they had the potential to cause social upheaval. Yee began serving his jail term on 13 October.

== Asylum to the U.S and further legal issues (2016–2026) ==
On 16 December 2016, Yee fled to the United States with the assistance of Singaporean activist Melissa Chen. Upon arrival at O'Hare International Airport in Chicago, he was detained by Customs and Border Protection after announcing his intention to seek political asylum, with his reasoning being that the U.S. best supported his political beliefs, which included anarchist communism, although he remained highly critical of the federal government. During the application, he was incarcerated in McHenry County Jail in Illinois before being transferred to Dodge County Detention Facility in Wisconsin. Yee was granted asylum on 24 March 2017, after judge Samuel B. Cole ruled that Yee faced persecution in Singapore for his political opinions, citing the different treatment that Cheng and Yee received in his decision.

On 25 April 2017, the U.S. government appealed the asylum judgement, leading to the continuation of Yee's detention at the Immigration and Customs Enforcement (ICE) centre. He was released from an ICE facility in downtown Chicago on 26 September 2017 after the Board of Immigration Appeals upheld his bid for asylum. After his release, Yee told reporters that he could criticise the Singaporean government without fear of imprisonment and that he would possibly broaden his work to cover US politics. A statement released by Singapore's Ministry of Law questioned the grounds for granting political asylum to a Singaporean citizen.

=== Incarceration on child pornography charges ===
On 16 October 2020, Yee was arrested by the Marshals Service at his apartment in Chicago for state charges of solicitation and possession of child pornography, after he exchanged messages and nude photos with a 14-year-old Texas girl via WhatsApp from 1 February to 30 June 2019. His bail was set at US$1 million and he was banned from internet usage while awaiting trial.

Yee initially pleaded not guilty, but later accepted a plea bargain in late 2021, where he pled guilty to two charges of child grooming and child pornography in exchange for a 6-year prison sentence and the dismissal of 16 other charges. He was also warned that he could be deported to Singapore and denied naturalisation as an American citizen. The sentence was backdated to his arrest, with a projected release date of 8 October 2026.

=== Parole violation and re-arrest ===
Yee was released on parole on 7 October 2023, and moved into shared housing with other sex offenders. On 23 October, he made a blog post reiterating his support for paedophilia and detailing his experiences in prison and under parole, as well as his plans to reoffend and return to Singapore. On 5 November, Yee made a second blog post, declaring his intention to popularise the defence of paedophiles and illegal public protests. It was reported on 8 November that Yee had been re-arrested for violating parole conditions and had been transferred to the maximum security Stateville Correctional Center in Crest Hill, Illinois. On 12 December 2023, he was transferred to Danville Correctional Center, a medium security prison. After being released on his projected parole date of 7 November 2025, Yee was readmitted to prison on the same day for violation of parole conditions.

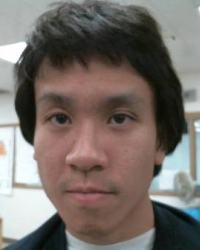
Booking photograph of Amos Yee in ICE custody

On 20 November 2025, Yee faced deportation to Singapore after being released from Danville Correctional Center on parole and was reported on 24 November to be detained in an ICE detention facility. Having been required to perform compulsory national service in Singapore around 2016 under the Enlistment Act, he was considered a defaulter under Singaporean law, a status carrying a prison sentence between two and 36 months, depending on the length of the default period, and a potential fine of up to S$10,000. On 24 November, the Ministry of Defence announced that he would be charged for violating the Enlistment Act upon his expected return to Singapore.

== Return to Singapore (2026–present) ==
On 19 March 2026, Yee was refouled to Singapore. On 20 March, he was arrested by the Central Manpower Base's enlistment officers. He was charged with three counts under the Enlistment Act at his court hearing that same day. On 26 March, he was released on a bail of S$10,000, which had been offered on the same day and paid by his mother. Yee is expected to plead guilty on 7 September.

Yee planned to attend Doujima 2026, an anime convention, but was barred from entry by the organisers on 8 May 2026 due to concerns about the safety of minors. Nonetheless, he turned up at Suntec Convention and Exhibition Centre on 9 May where the convention was held and was turned away at the door. He was then assaulted by an 18-year-old cosplaying as Yuji Itadori. The cosplayer was arrested and charged for assault and causing public nuisance, while Yee sustained minor injuries.

On 26 August 2026, he was charged with additional charges of knowingly attempting to promote, on grounds of race, feelings of disharmony between different racial groups, and for making indecent communications likely to cause alarm. On 7 April and 11 April 2026, he had published two posts on his blog where he stated Singaporean Malay-Muslim and Indians were being discriminated against by the Chinese majority. He also published a blog post on 30 June, where he said that children were capable of consenting to sexual acts and advocated for the abolition of laws governing the age of consent. His existing $10,000 bail was increased to $15,000.
