= Melissa Chen =

Singaporean journalist in America (born 1985)

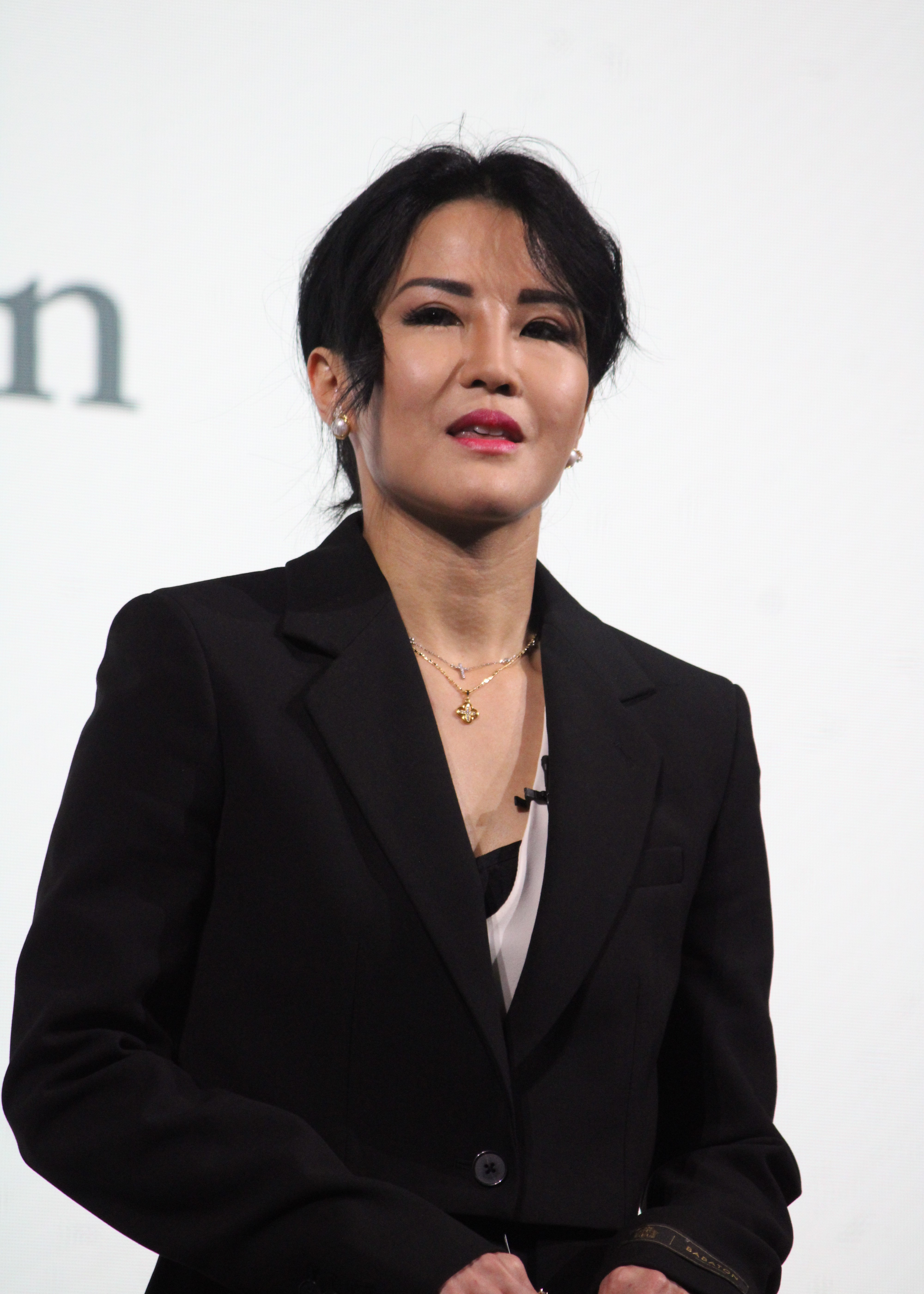
- Chen in 2025
- Born: 1985 (age 40–41); Singapore
- Occupations: Journalist, activist
- Known for: Advocating asylum for Amos Yee (initially), criticism of human rights record in China and Singapore
- Notable work: Ideas Beyond Borders
- Partner: Winston Marshall (fiancé since 2023)

Melissa Chen (born 1985) is a Singaporean American social commentator and activist. She is a contributing editor for Spectator USA.

== Biography ==
Chen was born in Singapore in 1985. She immigrated to the United States at 17, living in Boston and attending Boston University. She later became a journalist.

Chen rose to prominence as an advocate for Amos Yee, a Singaporean student who had been arrested and imprisoned for publishing materials (depicting Singapore's founding father Lee Kuan Yew in a negative way, and also criticizing Christianity and Islam) that the government of Singapore considered to be insulting. Chen assisted Yee when he fled to the United States and claimed political asylum.

Yee severed ties with Chen in 2017 for what he saw as her authoritarianism. Chen later called for Yee to "be deported from the United States" to Singapore for "supporting pedophilia and child porn".

In 2017 Chen co-founded Ideas Beyond Borders (Note: The organization focuses on translating works written in English into Arabic; most of the translated works are books that are considered controversial in the Arabic world, such as George Orwell's Nineteen Eighty-Four and works by Thomas Paine.) with Faisal Saeed Al Mutar, an Iraqi advocate for free speech. Chen serves as the organization's managing director.

She was one of the first advisors, along with Bari Weiss, for FAIR, an organization that opposes programmes which it regards as "critical race theory". On The New Yorker, Emma Green wrote about Chen's involvement in FAIR and her conflicts with its other members.

=== Views ===
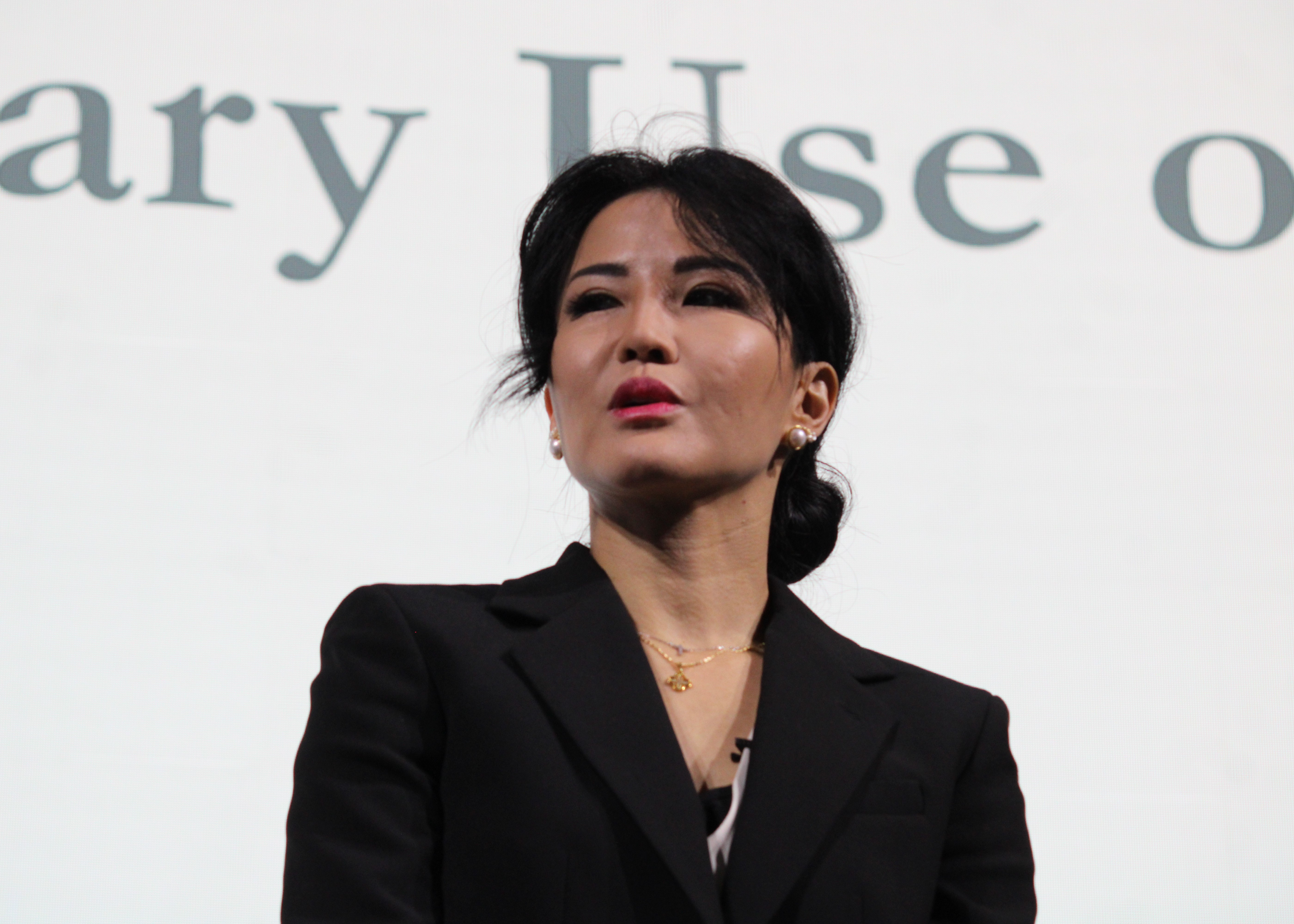
Chen speaking at the Alliance for Responsible Citizenship, London, 2025

Chen is a critic of China's human rights record, curtailment of free speech, and foreign policy. She is also a critic of her native Singapore's approach to free speech.

In March 2020, Chen authored an article in The Spectator USA which called for China to ban "wet markets, like the one in Wuhan that was ground zero for the Covid-19 pandemic". After Singaporeans criticised the article's use of an image of a Singaporean wet market, Chen stated that the image used was chosen by an editor and not herself, and that her article did not criticize wet markets in Singapore.

In 2021, Chen wrote a New York Post article criticising the removal of The Adventures of Ook and Gluk: Kung-Fu Cavemen from the Future by Dav Pilkey from publication by HarperCollins in response to a 289-signature petition accusing the book of stereotyping harmful to Asians in depicting kung fu master Master Wong as wearing "a traditional-style Tang coat" and using "stereotypical Chinese proverbs" in training his black and non-Asian students to eventually surpass him in skill, with Chen instead praising Wong as "a prime example of a positive portrayal of an Asian character in literature, [coming] across as endearing and full of wisdom", rebutting the petition creator's perception of the novel's Chinese proverbs as stereotypical.

Chen called for the flogging of Just Stop Oil activists in 2022, writing, "My home country Singapore got it right all along. Flogging needs to make a comeback as the penalty for vandalism."

== Personal life ==
Chen got engaged to former Mumford & Sons guitarist Winston Marshall in December 2023.
