= The Paperboy (children's book) =

1996 picture book by Dav Pilkey

- Author: Dav Pilkey
- Language: English
- Publisher: Orchard Books
- Publication date: March 1, 1996
- Publication place: United States
- Pages: 32
- Awards: Caldecott Honor
- ISBN: 978-0-531-09506-5
- OCLC: 32700284

The Paperboy is a 1996 children's picture book written and illustrated by Dav Pilkey. Inspired by Pilkey's own experiences as a paperboy, it tells the story of a paperboy and his dog as they deliver newspapers in the early hours of the morning. The Paperboy received positive reviews from critics and was awarded a 1997 Caldecott Honor for its illustrations.

== Plot ==
An unnamed paperboy and his faithful dog wake up early each morning while it is still dark and cold outside and his family is still asleep. After breakfast, the paperboy folds and delivers newspapers, accompanied by his dog; they both find happiness and comfort in the familiar routine. They finish at sunrise as the rest of the world begins to wake up, and they return home to fall asleep and dream.

== Background and publication ==
According to Pilkey, The Paperboy was written in fifteen minutes, although he had thought about the idea for two or three years beforehand. The story was inspired by Pilkey's own experiences as a paperboy delivering the Lorain Journal. In an interview, he stated: "I liked the independence I felt when it seemed like I was the only person in the whole world who was awake." Pilkey quickly completed the illustrations for The Paperboy so he could dedicate time to what was to be his subsequent book, Make Way for Dumb Bunnies.

The Paperboy was published on March 1, 1996, by Orchard Books. An audiobook version, narrated by Forest Whitaker and accompanied by a short video with animations based on the original illustrations, was released by Weston Woods Studios in 2000.

== Reception ==
The Paperboy received positive reviews from critics. Publishers Weekly wrote that "Pilkey is at his best" in the book, and praised the illustrations and "the controlled hush of the narrative". Kirkus Reviews called the book "a gentle salve for the instability in so much of modern life" and favorably compared the black paperboy to the protagonist from The Snowy Day by Ezra Jack Keats. Carolyn Phelan of Booklist wrote that the illustrations included "beautifully composed landscapes and interiors" and were evocative of the art of Marc Chagall. Wendy Lukehart, writing for School Library Journal, called The Paperboy a "totally satisfying story", praising Pilkey's "graceful economy of language" and "deep, sumptuous acrylics". Mary M. Burns of The Horn Book Magazine praised the "lyrical combination of text and pictures" and "rich and inviting" palette, and called the story a "meditative evocation of the extraordinary aspects of ordinary living".

The audiobook and video adaptation also received positive reviews. AudioFile wrote that "Forest Whitaker narrates with the gentle voice the story merits," and that the various sound effects added "just enough reality to the delicate scene". Teresa Bateman of School Library Journal wrote that The Paperboy "adapts beautifully to the video format". Candace Smith, writing for Booklist, called it a "faithful iconographic adaptation" of the original book.

The Paperboy received a 1997 Caldecott Honor for its illustrations. In an interview, Pilkey stated: "Winning the Caldecott Honor Award was probably the coolest professional thing to happen to me since I began writing books."
