= Faisal Saeed Al Mutar =

Iraqi-born satirist, human-rights activist and writer

- فيصل سعيد المطر
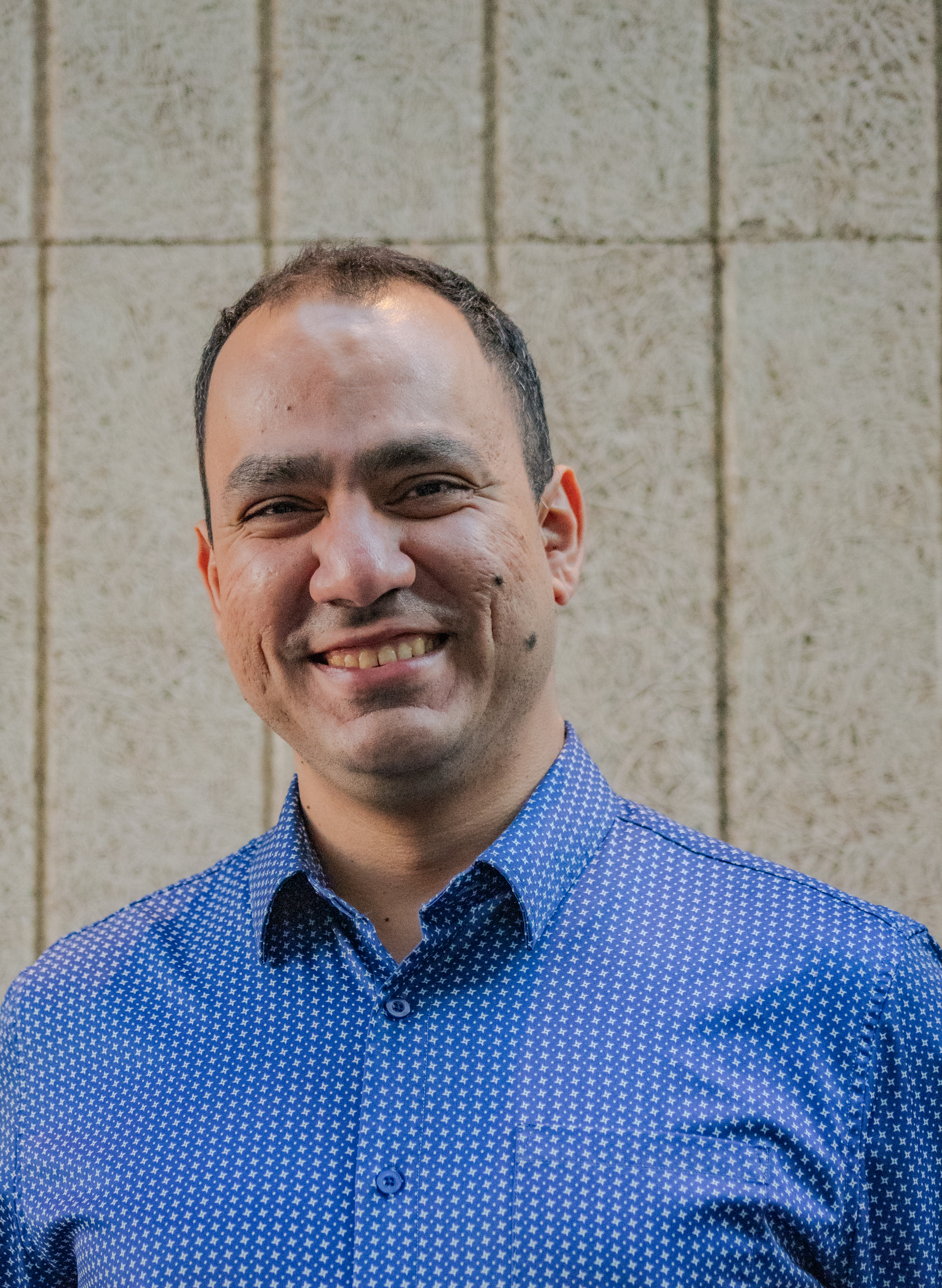
- Faisal Saeed Al Mutar in 2025
- Born: 1991 (age 34–35); Babylon, Iraq
- Citizenship: United States, Iraq
- Years active: 2005–present
- Known for: International Development
- Notable work: Ideas Beyond Borders
- Title: Founder and President
- Awards: Honorary Doctorate
- Website: https://www.theinternationalcorrespondent.com/

Faisal Saeed Al Mutar (Arabic: فيصل سعيد المطر; born 1991) is an Iraqi-American human-rights activist and social entrepreneur who was admitted to the United States as a refugee in 2013. He is founder of Global Conversations and Ideas Beyond Borders and formerly worked for Movements.org to assist dissidents in closed societies worldwide. He became an American citizen in June 2019.

== Biography ==
Faisal Saeed Al Mutar was born in Hillah, Iraq, in 1991. He later moved to Baghdad. Al Mutar grew up in a religiously moderate Muslim family in Iraq, though he remained nonreligious throughout his upbringing. He described growing up under Saddam as being exposed to the "motherlode of misinformation".

Al Mutar's writings and secular lifestyle made him a target for threats and attacks by al-Qaeda. He survived three attempted kidnappings. His brother and cousin were also killed by al-Qaeda in sectarian violence there. Al Mutar visited Lebanon and then Malaysia where he founded the Global Secular Humanist Movement in September 2010 "with the mission of addressing the absence of recognition and legal protections for secular humanists." As a result of his activism, Al Mutar received death threats from religious militias such as the Mahdi Army and elements tied to al-Qaeda.

Due to his conflicts with Islamists over his secular identity and the deaths of his brother and cousin in sectarian violence, Al Mutar fled Iraq and received refugee status in the U.S. in 2013. After first living for a number of months in Houston, Al Mutar moved to New York City., where he lives and continues to operate Ideas Beyond Borders with the broader aim of making Wikipedia pages, academic articles and seminal works covering science, literature and philosophy available to Arabic speakers in attempt to confront lies with logic and pit critical thinking against propaganda and fake news. He also served as a community manager for Movements.org, a platform which "allows activists from closed societies to connect directly with people around the world with skills to help them."

In 2017 Al Mutar and Singaporean journalist Melissa Chen founded Ideas Beyond Borders, a nonprofit that works to: "promote the free exchange of ideas and to defend human rights ... to counter extremist narratives and authoritarian institutions."

"Less than 1% of internet content is available in Arabic, rendering much of Wikipedia's trove unusable. In 2017 Mr. Mutar, then a refugee living in New York, wanted to change that. He founded the nonprofit Ideas Beyond Borders (IBB) and has since hired 120 young people across the Middle East to translate Wikipedia pages into Arabic, starting with subjects they thought were most needed: female scientists, human rights, logical reasoning, and philosophy." The effort is referred to as House of Wisdom 2.0 and is organized by the I Believe in Science group: "I Believe in Science has more than 300 volunteers and has translated over 10,000 articles. Its founder, Ahmed al-Rayyis, now organizes the translation team for IBB, and many of those volunteers have since been hired as Bayt al-Hikma translators."

In April 2021, Faisal launched a campaign to bring back books to the destroyed library of Mosul by donating 2,500 books from a list provided by the university, prioritizing works required by different departments. The project also supplied 20 computers and 20 printers to "allow the library to access electronic books and journals from around the world and reconnect the university to the global community.

In August 2021, following the Withdrawal of United States troops from Afghanistan he launched a program to hire more than 70 Afghan translators who used to formally work with the US Army and international development agencies to the House of Wisdom 2.0 Project to translate books and articles into Dari and Pashtu.

== Personal views ==
On Ideas Beyond Borders, Al Mutar mentioned "We are not a political organisation but we embrace some of the controversial books and content because we believe Arab youth should be allowed to make up their own minds about how they want to live their lives." and "We are sharing fresh ideas with millions… I believe these ideas, this knowledge, will defeat ignorance and extremism more effectively than tanks and guns ever could".

Regarding misinformation, Al Mutar mentioned "On an average day, for an average young person looking at their cellphone right now, much of the information they see is really nonfactual. My goal and my inspiration is for there to be actual sources of information and make that information accessible to those who need it."

Al Mutar said in a 2023 interview that "Iraq is better off" without Saddam Hussein and that "Iraqis today are more free."

Al Mutar attributes the rise of al-Qaeda, ISIS and the Taliban to Islamism which he says will make terrorism difficult to eradicate by U.S. military force alone. He cites the easy availability of funding as a compounding factor. Al Mutar believes that the Middle East is responsible for enforcing peace in their region. He says the West's inflated sense of moral responsibility, which he calls "the racism of lower expectation," erodes the Middle East's imperative to address its own issues, such as the Syrian refugee crisis.

On ISIS, Al Mutar mentioned "ISIS' main goal is to destroy knowledge and culture, while IBB's main goal is to create a knowledge movement in Iraq and make information accessible across the Middle East."

In 2024, Faisal Saeed Al Mutar delivered a TED Talk titled “A Fresh Approach to International Development”. In the talk, he discusses the importance of challenging traditional models of development aid and emphasizes locally-driven solutions that empower individuals in the Middle East. His approach focuses on fostering entrepreneurship, critical thinking, and free expression as sustainable alternatives to traditional charity-based interventions.

Al Mutar sees the translation project as a long-term investment in the region. "My goal is to prevent refugee crises from happening in the first place, rather than dealing with refugees," he says. "I strongly believe that education and really changing the ecosystem of information is the way to go."

Al Mutar criticized President Donald Trump's executive order suspending admission of immigrants for putting refugees "in harm's way."

Al Mutar was a columnist for Free Inquiry and currently writes for Substack.

== Awards ==
In 2016 Al Mutar received the gold President's Volunteer Service Award from President Barack Obama for his volunteer service in the United States and around the world.

In 2021, he received a fellowship award from the Elevate Prize Foundation by Joseph Deitch.

in 2023, his organization Ideas Beyond Borders won Atlas Network’s 2023 Middle East & North Africa Liberty Award and the 2024 Smart Bets Award.

In 2024, Faisal Saeed Al Mutar won the Beacon Award by the Ellis Island Honors Society that recognizes and celebrates the next generation of professionals, entrepreneurs, philanthropists, artists, and visionary leaders .

In 2024, Faisal Saeed Al Mutar was awarded an honorary doctorate from Whittier College. This honor is reserved for individuals who have demonstrated exceptional moral fiber, and outstanding convictions, ambitions, values, and accomplishments.

In 2024, Al Mutar became a non-resident fellow at the Program on Extremism at George Washington University, where he contributes to research and strategies to counter disinformation and radicalization.
