= Captain Underpants and the Revolting Revenge of the Radioactive Robo-Boxers =

Book by Dav Pilkey

- Author: Dav Pilkey
- Illustrator: Dav Pilkey
- Language: English
- Series: Captain Underpants series
- Genre: Children's novel, comic science fiction
- Publication date: January 15, 2013 (black and white); September 1, 2020 (full color)
- Publication place: United States
- Media type: Print (hardback)
- Pages: 221
- ISBN: 9780545175364
- Preceded by: Captain Underpants and the Terrifying Re-Turn of Tippy Tinkletrousers
- Followed by: Captain Underpants and the Tyrannical Retaliation of the Turbo Toilet 2000

Captain Underpants and the Revolting Revenge of the Radioactive Robo-Boxers is the tenth book in the Captain Underpants series created by Dav Pilkey. It was released on January 15, 2013. This book is a continuation of Captain Underpants and the Terrifying Return of Tippy Tinkletrousers, where George and Harold go back in time and team up with cavemen to stop Tippy Tinkletrousers (Professor Poopypants) once and for all.

== Plot ==
Continuing from the previous book, it is revealed that the giant zombie nerds move at a slow pace, so the giant Zombie Nerd Harold actually crushed a giant ketchup packet, not Tippy. Tippy Tinkletrousers travels back to 10 minutes before Kipper and friends see him and freezes them. Tippy shrinks and takes his past self when George and Harold are about to be arrested. He freezes the cops, forming the end of the eighth book. Then he chases George and Harold throughout the city. The boys travel back with their pets but accidentally take Mr. Krupp along. Big Tippy sends his smaller self back ten minutes to find where, then back there, then where the small ones zap themselves back and steal the Goosy-Grow 4000, which turns Tiny Tippy extremely massive. When Big Tippy attempts to use his nuclear bomb to kill Captain Underpants, Supa Mega Tippy zaps himself back in time (with his twin) and kicks Big Tippy and his bomb away into the Gulf of Mexico. When the bomb explodes, it blows a huge crater and kills the dinosaurs.

The five protagonists and their captor then travel to the African savannas, where the boys and their pets earn the trust of some cavemen living in the surrounding jungles. The cavemen are taught English through drawings, and subsequently, the boys make the world's first comic book. The Neanderthals, inspired by the comic, then set traps for Tippy and defeat him. He then sets off his freeze ray (which has been tampered with by his younger twin so that it could not be turned off), and the Goosy-Grow 4000 enlarges the ice, which appears to make Crackers' condition deteriorate and causes the Ice Age (and freezing Tippy himself).

George and Harold are then transported to the future by Slightly Younger Tiny Tippy, who is now gigantic, thanks to the Goosy-Grow 4000. But it turns out they are now teachers at Jerome Horwitz Elementary, and Mr. Krupp is an old man. After getting rid of their evil future selves by vowing never to take life seriously, they snap their fingers, turning both Mr. Krupps into Captain Underpants, and they beat up Slightly Younger Tiny Tippy, who afterward attempts to use his nuclear bomb to blow up the entire galaxy. After that, Crackers and Sulu decide to save the entire galaxy by sending Slightly Younger Tiny Tippy and themselves back to the time before the universe existed (13.7 billion years ago). The three are then killed by Slightly Younger Tiny Tippy's giant nuclear bomb and the universe is formed. It also turns out that Crackers had laid a brood of 3 eggs (revealing that Crackers was a female), and George, Harold, and the younger Captain Underpants all decide to take care of them. Suddenly, Melvin Sneedly, in a giant Robo-Squid, appears and captures George, Harold, Captain Underpants, and Crackers' eggs, taking them back to the past.
