= Dogzilla (picture book) =

Book by Dav Pilkey

- Author: Dav Pilkey
- Illustrator: Dav Pilkey
- Language: English
- Genre: Children's
- Publisher: Harcourt, Inc.
- Publication date: 1993
- Publication place: United States
- Media type: Print (Hardback & Paperback)
- Pages: 32
- ISBN: 0-15-204948-7 (Hardback), 0-15-204949-5 (Paperback)

Dogzilla is a children's picture book created by Dav Pilkey that parodies Godzilla with a Cardigan Welsh Corgi. Harcourt, Inc. published this title in 1993. According to Pilkey, "The illustrations in this book are manipulated photographic collage, heavily retouched with acrylic paint." The photographs of the animals are of Pilkey's own pets. The book is dedicated to John "The Rapper" Wills. The book is a prequel to Kat Kong, which spoofs King Kong.

== Background ==
Dogzilla was inspired by Pilkey's love of giant monster movies, with him citing Godzilla vs. Megalon as a personal favorite. In addition, inspiration came from Pilkey's friend's son letting their dog into the house, while charging through the room and destroying the son's Lego castle, with Pilkey noting that the dog looked like it had just rampaged through a city.

Pilkey wrote both Dogzilla and its sequel Kat Kong in one week. The photos in the book were of Pilkey's dog, Leia, with Pilkey's pet mice being used as well. To photograph the dog with her ears up, Pilkey would have to say "do you want to go for a walk" up until the dog stopped reacting and the dog would need treats or to be taken on a walk to get the same response.

Pilkey's editor initially turned down the story, before another editor, Bonny Verberg, stopped by his office and became enamored with the concept painting of Dogzilla, offering to publish both Dogzilla and Kat Kong.

== Reception ==
Publishers Weekly described Dogzilla as "featuring a wacky mix of animal photos, art and a deadpan Sam Spade-style narrative." The book has appeared on children's reading and study lists.
