= The Hallo-Wiener =

1995 book by Dav Pilkey

- First edition cover
- Author: Dav Pilkey
- Illustrator: Dav Pilkey
- Cover artist: Dav Pilkey
- Language: English
- Genre: Children's
- Publisher: The Blue Sky Press
- Publication date: September 1, 1995
- Publication place: United States
- Media type: Print (hardback & paperback)
- Pages: 32 pp (first edition)
- ISBN: 0-439-07946-2
- OCLC: 31604470

The Hallo-Wiener is a children's book by Dav Pilkey and published on September 1, 1995, by The Blue Sky Press.

The story's main character is a dachshund named Oscar, who is named after Oscar Mayer.

== Plot ==
The story begins with Oscar Mayer, a dachshund who is described as "half-a-dog tall" and "one-and-a-half dogs long". Oscar is tired of the other dogs making fun of him because of his wiener-shaped body, laughing at him and calling him "Wiener Dog". Not helping is his sweet but smothering mother calling him pet names like "little Vienna Sausage" in front of them. Recently, however, Oscar had tried not to let the bullying get to him because it is Halloween, his favorite holiday, and he cannot wait to get a scary costume. At obedience school, he daydreams of Halloween and going trick-or-treating. When he comes home from school, his mother has a surprise for him: a hot dog bun costume with "mustard" along the top; Oscar is supposed to fit in the middle. He shows great reluctance and concern about getting laughed at, but wears the costume anyway, because he does not want to hurt his mother's feelings. That night, he sees the other dogs showing off their costumes. When they see Oscar's costume, they howl in laughter, saying that now, he really is a Wiener Dog, much to his dismay and embarrassment.

Oscar's costume is so heavy that it slows him down. Meanwhile, the dogs are selfishly getting all the candy so that by the time Oscar comes to the houses, there are no more treats left. Once they are done, the dogs pass by a graveyard when suddenly, they hear a noise. A monsterous pumpkin-headed creature rises up, causing them to scream very loudly and run away in fear, diving into a lake and begging for mercy as the monster jumps up and down and shrieks at them on the dock. When Oscar comes by and sees the monster, he notices something strange due to his short height. He bites the robe of the monster, pulls it off, and discovers that it is actually just two cats (who have been seen in the book's beginning hiding and making fun of the dogs) hiding underneath, using a jack-o-lantern and two brooms while standing on each other's shoulders to play a cruel prank. The scared and found out cats scream themselves and run away, frightened by the "giant frankfurter".

The dogs are extremely embarrassed to learn the truth and expect Oscar to laugh at them, but Oscar then jumps into the water and uses his costume as a life raft to rescue the other dogs. The dogs thank Oscar by sharing their candy with him. They then become friends and Oscar is never made fun of again, for he is from then on known as "Hero Sandwich" for his bravery and heroism.
