= The Adventures of Ook and Gluk =

Book by Dav Pilkey

The Adventures of Ook and Gluk: Kung-Fu Cavemen from the Future
- Book cover
- Author: Dav Pilkey ("credited" as George Beard)
- Illustrator: Dav Pilkey ("credited" as Harold Hutchins)
- Language: English
- Series: Captain Underpants series
- Genre: Children's novel
- Publisher: Blue Sky (US), Scholastic (US)
- Publication date: August 10, 2010
- Publication place: United States
- Media type: Print (Hardcover, Paperback)
- Pages: 176
- ISBN: 978-0-545-17530-2

The Adventures of Ook and Gluk: Kung-Fu Cavemen from the Future (or simply The Adventures of Ook and Gluk) is a graphic novel written by Dav Pilkey, the second spin-off of the Captain Underpants series. The book is credited to Captain Underpants characters "George Beard" as the author and "Harold Hutchins" as the illustrator.

The plot of the book involves George and Harold, the lead characters from Pilkey's Captain Underpants series, complaining that scientists do not know everything, so they make a comic book about science facts.

In March 2021, Pilkey and the publisher announced that the book would be removed from the market in response to a petition claiming it perpetuated racist stereotypes.

== Plot ==
In Cave-land, Ohio, 500,001 BC, the tribal leader Big Chief Goppernopper forces Gak, Ook's older sister, to marry him to prevent Ook and Gluk from causing trouble. After rescuing her from a sandpit, the cave kids befriend a dinosaur named Mog-Mog and her baby, whose friendship ultimately disrupts the wedding. Enraged, Goppernopper goes into exile but soon encounters his descendant J.P., CEO of Goppernopper Enterprises in 2222 A.D. In that future, the company has been extracting natural resources from the caveman era through a time portal, as their own resources have been depleted. Teaming up with his descendant, the Ex-Chief travels back, defeats Mog-Mog using a mechanical dinosaur (Mecha-Saur), and enslaves the population for Goppernopper Enterprises. The Cave-kids and baby Mog-Mog are forced to shovel until the Goppernoppers take them to 2222 for torture, but the baby helps them escape, and the three hide in Master Wong's School of Kung-Fu.

For seven years, Ook and Gluk train under Master Wong, who constantly challenges them with a pivotal question: "Who is the greatest man?" When the time comes to save their people, they answer, "Nobody." In recognition of their wisdom, Master Wong awards them black belts. Together with their dinosaur friend Lily—named by Wong's daughter, Lan—they travel back to the caveman era in 500,008 BC to free the slaves. Goppernopper returns, commanding his Mecha-Saurs to attack the cave kids and Lily, having programmed the robots to target them when they see their faces. The cave kids exploit this by spray-painting the companies' structures, including the Enterprises building. This diversion leads the Mecha-Saurs to destroy these structures and ultimately themselves after triggering an explosive tank. Shortly afterward, Goppernopper sends a letter threatening that Wong and Lan will be executed if the kids do not surrender.

Returning to 2229, the Goppernoppers reveal that they found Wong and Lan after noticing the cave kids' martial arts skills. Ook and Gluk are handcuffed in an attempt to negotiate with them, only for the Goppernoppers to double-cross them, planning to execute everyone. Wong advises them to remember their training; When J.P. prepares to use his ray, the cave kids ask him and Chief about Wong's question: "Who is the greatest man?" J.P. and Chief both respond by declaring themselves, which quickly leads to an argument. The situation escalates into a physical fight, culminating in J.P. accidentally shooting Chief after being beaten by him. This causes him to be erased from history, along with the damage he caused to the world. The cave kids and Lily rush back to the vanishing portal, but Ook returns for Lan. She agrees to become his cave wife, and together they travel through the portal, while 2229 receives a brighter, more peaceful future. Lily is joyfully reunited with her mother, and the cave kids, Lan, and the dinosaurs happily return to Cave-land.

== Characters ==
- Ook Schadowski – A caveman who is best friends with Gluk. Ook later marries Lan.
- Gluk Jones – A caveman who is the best friend of Ook. He later marries Ook's sister Gak.
- Gak Schadowski – Ook's older sister who later becomes Gluk's wife.
- Master Derrick Wong – Ook and Gluk's kung-fu teacher from the 23rd century, who taught the two heroes kung-fu for many years. He is the father of Lan.
- Lan Wong – Master Wong's daughter, who later becomes Ook's wife and moves to Caveland to have her marriage, leaving her father.
- Mog-Mog – A Tyrannosaurus rex who initially despised Ook and Gluk since they were kids, but ultimately became friends after Ook and Gluk saved her life.
- Lily Mog – Mog-Mog's dinosaur daughter. Lan named her Lily after her favorite flower; she vomits after spinning in circles. After being separated from Mog-Mog following Chief Goppernopper's destruction, she was looked after by Ook and Gluk.
- Big Chief Goppernopper – The dictator of Caveland and one of the two main antagonists.
- Big Chief Goppernopper's Guards
- J.P. Goppernopper – The chief executive officer of Goppernopper Enterprises and the descendant of Chief Goppernopper. He is one of the two main antagonists. Goppernopper's name is based on John D. Rockefeller.
- J.P. Goppernopper's Workers
- The Mechasaurs – A robotic T-Rex, Triceratops, and Pterodactyl who Goppernopper sends to attack Ook and Gluk.
- Gluk Jones Jr. – The son of Gluk and Gak Jones.
- Ook Schadowski Jr. – The son of Ook and Lan Schadowski.
- George Beard – Author of Captain Underpants. (Only appeared in the About the Author and Illustrator page).
- Harold Hutchins – Illustrator of Captain Underpants, Super Diaper Baby, The Amazing Cow Lady and Hairy Potty. (Only appeared in the About the Author and Illustrator page).
- Professor Gaylord Sneedly - The scientist and father of Melvin Sneedly, George and Harold's nemesis.

== Development ==
Ook and Gluk were originally going to be prehistoric paramedics, inspired by a story Dav Pilkey's editor told him about a student at a kindergarten she visited who pretended that a toy ambulance he brought for show-and-tell was a prehistoric ambulance used by cavemen to transport sick dinosaurs. While developing the characters over several years, Pilkey decided that "Kung-Fu Cavemen" sounded better and changed the story.

== Reception ==
The book was at #2 on the New York Times hardcover graphic novel best-sellers list its first week of release, and remained at first place for six consecutive weeks. It served 33 weeks on the list, its period on the list overlapping with the paperback edition's presence on the paperback best sellers list.

School Library Journal described the book's humor as "completely immature, and for the target audience, completely hilarious". Booklist suggested that the book would "appeal to those who like silly adventures, puke-based humor, and kung-fu fighting." Kate Pavao of Common Sense Media give the rate three stars out of five, stating that "Asian stereotypes mar Captain Underpants spin-off."

== Unproduced followups ==
At the end of the book, a sequel titled The Adventures of Ook and Gluk Jr.: Kung-Fu Cavekids in Outer Space was teased, featuring Ook, Gluk, and their children on an adventure in outer space. Additionally, Pilkey stated in a 2011 interview with Scholastic that he had plans for at least two more Ook and Gluk books, suggesting that a third entry was also in development.

In 2015, Pilkey confirmed that he had finished writing the sequel. However, in 2017, he revealed that he had not had time to start drawing it due to his work on the Dog Man series.

== Removal from market ==
On March 25, 2021, Dav Pilkey stated on his YouTube channel that he and Scholastic had removed the book from print in response to a Change.org petition of 289 signatures by Korean-American Billy Kim, accusing the book of harmful stereotyping of Asians, specifically singling out the "[Chinese] kung fu master [Master Wong] wearing what's purported to be a traditional-style Tang coat", for using "stereotypical Chinese proverbs", and for having "a storyline that has the kung fu master rescued by the non-Asian [biracial] protagonists using their kung fu skills".

According to the video, all money that Pilkey and his wife have made from the book would be donated to "charities that provide free books, art supplies, and theater for children in underserved communities; organizations that promote diversity in children's books and publishing; and organizations designed to stop Asian hatred."

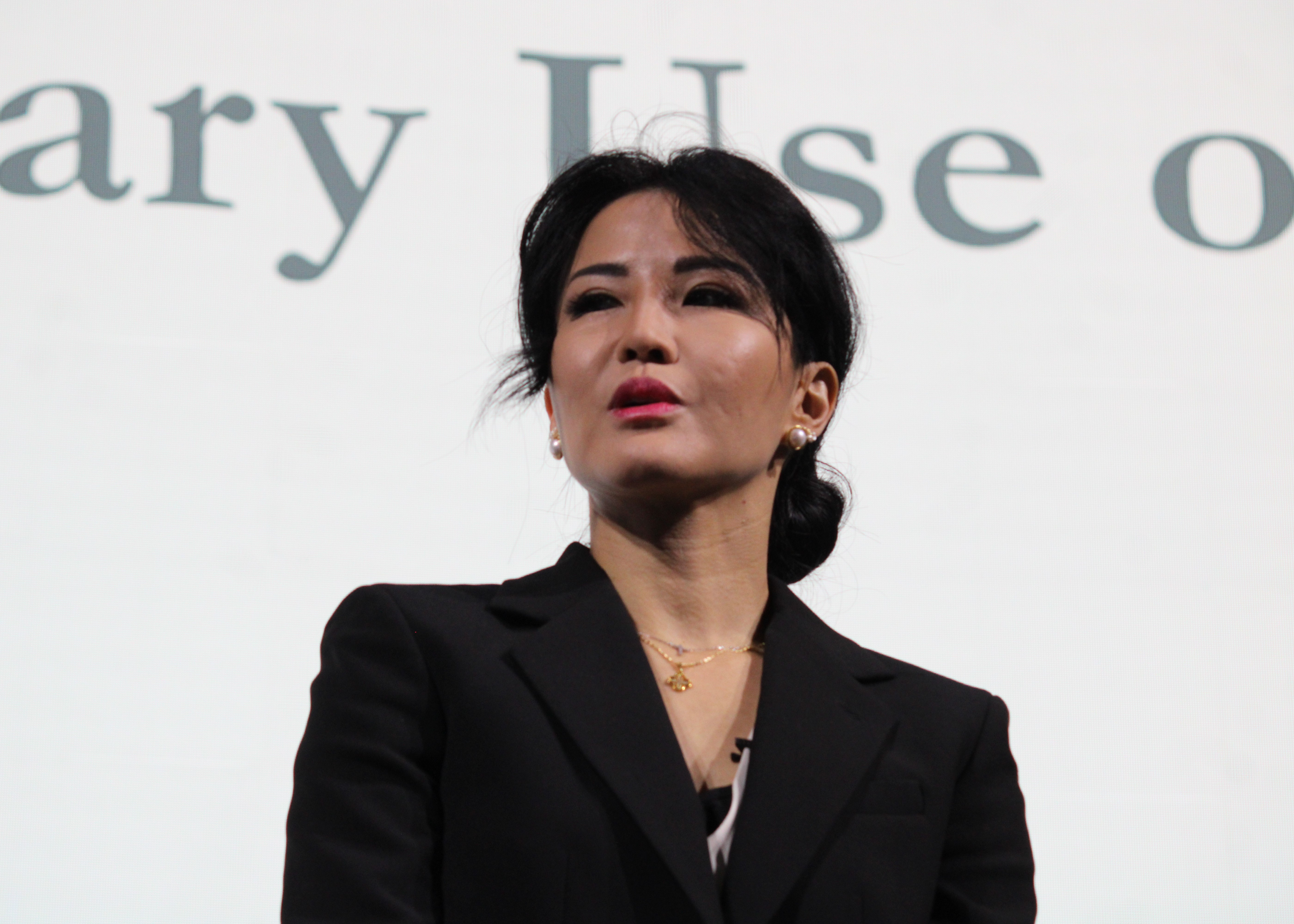
The removal was criticised by journalist Melissa Chen

The decision to pull the novel from publication was criticised by Singaporean Melissa Chen of The New York Post and Reason editor-in-chief Katherine Mangu-Ward. Chen praised "Wong [a]s a prime example of a positive portrayal of an Asian character in literature, [coming] across as endearing and full of wisdom", and took issue with Kim's perception of the novel's Chinese proverbs as stereotypical. Mangu-Ward called attention to previous campaigns to remove Pilkey's Captain Underpants books from publication, calling Kung-Fu Cavemen "charming, not racist", and cited "Pilkey's whole gag [as] the censorial impulse [being] ridiculous and kids instinctively know[ing] it should be mocked." She called for its republication amongst a list of books banned in America in August 2022. Following the novel's removal from the market, Bleeding Cool reported that physical copies of the novel were now selling for $160 on eBay.
