= Kat Kong =

Children's picture book by Dav Pilkey

- Kat Kong cover
- Author: Dav Pilkey
- Illustrator: Dav Pilkey
- Language: English
- Genre: Picture book
- Publisher: Harcourt Brace & Company
- Publication date: 1993
- Publication place: United States
- Media type: Print (Hardback & Paperback)
- Pages: 30 pp
- ISBN: 0-15-242036-3 (Hardback), 0-15-242037-1 (Paperback)

Kat Kong is a children's picture book by Dav Pilkey. Harcourt Brace & Company published this title in 1993. The book parodies King Kong, depicted as a cat. According to Pilkey, "The illustrations in this book are manipulated photographic collage, heavily retouched with acrylic paint." The photographs of the animals are of Pilkey’s own pets. The book is dedicated to Nate Howard, who tamed the "savage" cat. As a joke, the book has been rated TS, meaning "Terribly Silly." The prequel to this book is Dogzilla, which spoofs Godzilla.

== Background ==
Kat Kong was based on Pilkey's love of monster movies, with King Kong being one of his favorites.

Kat Kong was written shortly after Dogzilla, as Pilkey was inspired by his pet cat, named Blueberry and thought it might be nice to write about her in addition to the family dog.

In order to get the cat to pose, Pilkey had a friend hold her up and blow on the back of her head to make her meow. Pilkey then removed his friend's fingers and retouched the images of the cat with acrylic paint. Photographs of Pilkey's pet mice were also used for the images of the mice in the city.
