= Captain Underpants and the Attack of the Talking Toilets =

1999 novel by Dav Pilkey

- First edition cover
- Author: Dav Pilkey
- Illustrator: Dav Pilkey
- Language: English
- Series: Captain Underpants series
- Genre: Children's novel, humor
- Publisher: Scholastic, Blue Sky (US)
- Publication date: February 1, 1999 (black-and-white); January 7, 2014 (color edition)
- Publication place: United States
- Media type: Print (paperback, hardcover)
- Pages: 144
- ISBN: 0-590-63427-5
- Preceded by: The Adventures of Captain Underpants
- Followed by: Captain Underpants and the Invasion of the Incredibly Naughty Cafeteria Ladies from Outer Space (and the Subsequent Assault of the Equally Evil Lunchroom Zombie Nerds)

Captain Underpants and the Attack of the Talking Toilets is an American children's book (taking the form of a novel) written and illustrated by Dav Pilkey, and is the second book in the Captain Underpants book series. It was published on February 1, 1999. It marks the first appearance of the Turbo Toilet 2000, the Talking Toilets, and the Incredible Robo-Plunger, as well as George and Harold's nerdy tattletale nemesis Melvin Sneedly.

== Plot ==
With Jerome Horwitz Elementary School holding its Invention Convention, George Beard and Harold Hutchins are forced by Mr. Krupp to stay in the study hall all day because they had glued everyone to their seats the previous year. While getting ready to secretly sabotage everyone's inventions, the two boys run into Melvin Sneedly, working late on his invention, a photocopier that can turn a picture of something into a real being. George and Harold promise not to sabotage it, as long as he doesn't report them. The convention soon has to be called off, and Melvin breaks his promise on purpose and tattles after Krupp is left confused.

An infuriated Krupp puts them in detention for the rest of the school year, threatening suspension if they leave detention even once. George and Harold get assigned writing lines for two hours after school. With each boy using a quick line-writing device, they write all their lines in three-and-a-half minutes, then make an Underpants comic. However, the copy machine is surrounded by teachers, so they copy off of Melvin's machine, but the talking toilets come to life. While fleeing, George and Harold are caught by Krupp and suspended. The boys try to explain what happened in the gym, but he tells them to go home anyway. All the teachers celebrate in the gym, but Mr. Meaner, the gym teacher, is promptly eaten by one of the toilets. Ms. Ribble then snaps her fingers at a toilet, making Krupp turn into Underpants. George and Harold chase him as he takes several pairs of underwear from unsuspecting clotheslines.

Back at school, the trio finds only Ribble on the toilet table. The trio slings chipped beef with his underwear, and the Toilets vomit all the teachers out and die. Soon after, the Turbo Toilet 2000 bursts out of the school and, despite Underpants's efforts, the superhero is swallowed whole. The boys sneak into Melvin's machine to build a super-powered robot called the Incredible Robo-Plunger, which plunges into the Turbo's mouth, allowing the boys to save Krupp. He fears that he will be fired for the damages, but the Robo-Plunger repairs all of it, and flies off to Uranus with the command never to return. In return, Krupp cancels their detention, and as the principals, the boys hold an all-day carnival for the students and put the teachers (and Melvin) in detention. At the end of the day, Krupp questions how the carnival will be paid for; the boys reveal they sold his antique furniture, as well as all the furniture in the teacher's lounge. Krupp is outraged, and Miss Anthrope snaps her fingers after the boys, making Krupp become Underpants again.

== Title change ==
Early versions of the book say "Another Epic Novel by Dav Pilkey" instead of "The Second Epic Novel by Dav Pilkey".

== Adaptations ==
Elements of the book were adapted in Captain Underpants: The First Epic Movie.

A manga adaptation titled Captain Underpants and the Attack of the Talking Toilets: The Second Epic Manga will be released on April 6, 2027.

== See also ==
- The Adventures of Captain Underpants, the first Captain Underpants novel that Dav Pilkey made in 1997.
- Captain Underpants and the Invasion of the Incredibly Naughty Cafeteria Ladies from Outer Space (and the Subsequent Assault of the Equally-Evil Lunchroom Zombie Nerds), the book that follows this one.
- Children's literature
- Dav Pilkey
- Captain Underpants, the series Dav Pilkey made.
- Captain Underpants and the Tyrannical Retaliation of the Turbo Toilet 2000
