= Captain Underpants and the Invasion of the Incredibly Naughty Cafeteria Ladies from Outer Space =

1999 book by Dav Pilkey

- First edition cover
- Author: Dav Pilkey
- Illustrator: Dav Pilkey
- Language: English (Original)
- Series: Captain Underpants series
- Genre: Children's novel, Humor, Science fiction
- Publisher: Blue Sky (US); Scholastic (US)
- Publication date: September 1, 1999 (black-and-white); December 30, 2014 (color)
- Publication place: United States
- Media type: Print (Paperback) (Hardcover)
- Pages: 144
- ISBN: 0-439-04996-2
- Preceded by: Captain Underpants and the Attack of the Talking Toilets
- Followed by: Captain Underpants and the Perilous Plot of Professor Poopypants

Captain Underpants and the Invasion of the Incredibly Naughty Cafeteria Ladies from Outer Space is the third book of the Captain Underpants series by Dav Pilkey. The series of American children's books are about two fourth graders, George and Harold, and their mean principal Mr. Krupp, who can turn into Captain Underpants. It was published on September 1, 1999. It is the first book to feature the use of 'Extra-Strength Super Power Juice' (an invention of Zorx, Klax, and Jennifer, the antagonists of the book), which is used to give Captain Underpants superpowers later in the book.

== Plot ==
Zorx, Klax, and Jennifer, three evil extraterrestrials, land on the roof of Jerome Horwitz, which nobody notices. Meanwhile, George and Harold mess with their science teacher, then make the cafeteria ladies a fake recipe, disguised as "Mr. Krupp's Krispy Krupcakes" for Principal Krupp's birthday. The lunch ladies decide to surprise Krupp and make cupcakes for the entire school, and the school is flooded with green goop. Furious, the lunch ladies blame George and Harold, but Krupp needs proof to punish them. Furious from past harassment by the two boys, the lunch ladies quit. Soon after, the aliens come in, very badly disguised as humans, and Krupp hires the three. For the boys' antics, Krupp forces them to eat their lunch in his office. The next day, while Krupp has a banana, both boys have their own weird sandwiches and other junk food, causing a repulsed Krupp to exit his office.

After their lunch, the sign is already changed. They immediately notice that the students have become evil zombie nerds. Sneaking into the lunchroom, George and Harold learn that the aliens plan to feed the zombie nerds growth juice, turning them into giant minions bent on taking over the world. George and Harold steal the carton of growth juice and pour the contents out the window, most of which lands on a dandelion, turning it into the massive Dandelion of Doom. Krupp doesn't believe them, but starts to after Anthrope takes a bite out of his desk. When Harold escapes an alien's grasp, he pulls off her gloves in the process. The alien snaps her tentacle at them, turning Krupp into Underpants, who runs to the local shoe store for a cheeseburger (a callback to a gag advisory warning on the "Flip-O-Rama" section on the previous pages).

The boys temporarily defeat the aliens by Underpants' return, but the three escape into the alien spaceship soon after, where they steal multiple cartons of juice before the aliens lock them in their cell. While the aliens gloat, the boys switch the labels on the growth and self-destruct juices, as well as the spray and fuel tanks. This trio jumps off the spaceship before it explodes, and, under Underpants' cape parachute, they land near the Dandelion of Doom, which begins to eat Underpants. George reluctantly gives some of the "Extra-Strength Super Power Juice" to Captain Underpants, who kills the dandelion with his new powers. Harold mixes the Anti-Nerd Juice with root beer, which transforms the zombie nerds back into humans. However, as a result of the Super Power Juice, Mr. Krupp (when Underpants) permanently has superpowers.

== Reception ==
Publishers Weekly noted: "As in the earlier installments, this zany tale adopts a variety of formats, including sprightly illustrated text; reproductions of the two boys' homemade comic books; and ""flip-o-rama"" pages that replicate "world-famous cheesy animation technique." A commentator noted the book offered numerous examples of "bathroom humor" while a review at Kirkus Reviews concluded: "As in the previous appearances of Captain Underpants (The Adventures of Captain Underpants, 1997, etc.), this gross but not gruesome adventure will have fans looking forward to the upcoming (and obviously perfectly tasteful) Captain Underpants and the Perilous Plot of Professor Poopypants. "

== See also ==
- Captain Underpants and the Attack of the Talking Toilets, the previous Captain Underpants novel that Dav Pilkey made in February 1999.
- Captain Underpants and the Perilous Plot of Professor Poopypants, the book that follows this one.
