= Dumb Bunnies =

Series of books by Dav Pilkey

Dumb Bunnies is a series of books created by Dav Pilkey, the author of Captain Underpants, Dog Man, and Ricky Ricotta's Mighty Robot under the pseudonym "Sue Denim". They involve the adventures of a dumb family of three bunnies - Poppa, Momma, and Baby. The Dumb Bunnies did everything in reverse or out of order, including sleeping under beds and putting flowers upside down in vases.

The series is said to be mocking or parodying books like Goodnight Moon by Margaret Wise Brown and The Stupids Step Out by Harry G. Allard and illustrated by James Marshall.

== Book appearances ==
The Dumb Bunnies first appeared in the book The Dumb Bunnies. In the book the Dumb Bunnies live in "a log cabin made of bricks". They are having porridge when they decide take their bikes - that is, bringing their bikes along for the car ride. They go ice skating in a lake and bowl a home run in the public library. They go to Kentucky Fried Carrots (parody of Kentucky Fried Chicken) and have a picnic in the car wash. Meanwhile, Little Red Goldilocks (a parody of Snow White, Little Red Riding Hood, and Goldilocks) enters their home. When the Dumb Bunnies return, they are thrilled to see her. But Poppa Bunny is embarrassed because he thought someone slept on his porridge. Momma Bunny is angry because she thought someone ate her bed. Baby Bunny cries because he thinks someone used his pimple cream. Then Papa Bunny dances a merry dance, Mama Bunny sings a merry song, and Baby Bunny flushes Little Red Goldilocks down the merry toilet. At the end of the book, a picture on the back cover shows her coming out of a sewer pipe and landing in a lake. The cover originally had the word "spam" on the bowl of porridge, which Pilkey claims was meant to be a joke, until the Hormel Foods Corporation threatened legal action, causing either a recall of the book or placing a golden sticker on it until a reprint was made without the word. The Spam covers have now become extremely hard to find.

The Dumb Bunnies' made their second appearance in the book The Dumb Bunnies Easter. The Dumb Bunnies are preparing for Easter (which appears to be more related to Christmas) and set up the decorations (including putting an "Easter Tree" upside down). After preparing, they spray-paint fried eggs (claimed to be "painting Easter Eggs") and watch a little football on the TV - that is, watching a miniature football on top of their television. They go to hang up their stockings before they realize that they are wearing them, and then sleep upside down in front of the fireplace. The Easter Bunny soon arrives and drops all the eggs down the chimney. The next morning, the Dumb Bunnies are thrilled to see the eggs (although they are completely cracked with shells lying everywhere).

Their third appearance was in the book Make Way for Dumb Bunnies. While the Dumb Bunnies are spending quality time at home, it suddenly starts raining. They think it is a perfect day to go to the beach and they head there. The Bunnies go biking in the water. Afterwards, Momma combs the beach (with a comb), Poppa goes fishing in a boat (by casting a fishing rod into a boat), and Baby Bunny blows up an inflatable raft by inflating it too much it pops. But then the sun comes out and they think it is bad weather, so they head to the movie theater (accidentally stealing a car in the process, thinking it's a free car based on the sign that read what they thought, but it actually says "FREE CAR WASH"). During the movie, the Dumb Bunnies think the projector is the screen, which blinds them for a while. They return home on a steamroller (which they thought was their car) and regain vision again.

The Dumb Bunnies' latest appearance is in the book The Dumb Bunnies Go to the Zoo. They first go outside to pick things in their garden (using pickaxes); Baby Bunny picks his nose. They later drive to the zoo, only to discover the animals they are seeing are a lot smaller than they really are (they mistake a small bird perched on the "Elephant" sign as being the elephant, and a butterfly perched on the "Lion" sign as being the lion). When the butterfly flutters off the sign they think the lion escaped and cause panic all over the zoo and let all the animals loose (including the "real" lion). The S.W.A.T. cops arrive to capture the lion, but the Dumb Bunnies say "he flew away". As they leave the zoo (the book says that they decide to go home, but they really got kicked out by the zookeeper), they come across two giant apes which they mistake for being "Free Kitties" (the box that the words were written on did contain real kittens, but when the apes climbed over the wall, they scared all the kittens, and the owner who carried the box, away). Baby Bunny decides to keep them, but as they drive out, the apes fall off the top of the car they had been tied to. Upon returning home, they discover that the apes are gone, so they forget about them. At the end of the day, they change into their pajamas (only half of their pajamas; Momma says she got them at a half-off sale) and get into their new waterbed (with a series of hoses spraying water on the bed) and fall asleep.

== Challenges ==
In 2010, The Dumb Bunnies Go to the Zoo was placed on the "Most Challenged Books of 2010" list that was published by the Canadian Library Association. The book was also challenged in Oregon; this time, it was challenged for "concern that reading this book may result in confusion and stupidity." The book was retained in the library.

Because of the "sarcastic view of humor", the series was challenged in Summit County and was moved out the primary library and into the intermediate library.

The original book was challenged in Texas because of parent complaints that the book depicted violence.

== Books ==
- The Dumb Bunnies (1994, Blue Sky Press; ISBN 0-590-47708-0)
- The Dumb Bunnies' Easter (1995, Blue Sky Press; ISBN 0-590-20241-3)
- Make Way for Dumb Bunnies (1996, Blue Sky Press; ISBN 0-590-58286-0)
- The Dumb Bunnies Go to the Zoo (1997, Blue Sky Press; ISBN 0-590-84735-X)

== Television series ==
Dumb Bunnies
- Genre: Animated series
- Created by: Dav Pilkey
- Developed by: Dale Schott
- Written by: Dale Schott; Laura Kosterski; Ken Ross; Erika Stobel; Bob Ardiell; Timothy Carter; Gerald Tripp; Nicola Barton; Ben Joseph; Dave Dias; Kim Thompson; Shan MacDougall; Bonnie Chung; Bridget Newson; Shelley Hoffman; Rob Pincombe; Hugh Duffy
- Voices of: Rob Smith; Catherine Gallant; Dustin Lauzon
- Narrated by: Peter Wildman
- Composer: Guy Gross
- Countries of origin: Canada; Australia; China
- Original language: English
- No. of episodes: 26

Production
- Executive producers: Patrick Loubert; Michael Hirsh; Clive A. Smith; Tim Brooke-Hunt; James Wang; Elizabeth Partyka
- Producer: Yoram Gross
- Running time: 30 minutes
- Production companies: Nelvana Limited; Yoram Gross-Village Roadshow Pty. Ltd. Hong Guang Animation (Suzhou) Co., Ltd. Scholastic Inc.

Original release
- Network: CBS (United States); YTV (Canada); Seven Network (Australia)
- Release: 3 October 1998 – 27 March 1999

It was also adapted into an animated television series produced by Nelvana and Yoram Gross-Village Roadshow, airing on CBS in the U.S. The show ran for 26 episodes, from October 3, 1998 to March 27, 1999. In Canada, the show ran on YTV. In Australia, the show ran on Seven Network.

=== Cast ===
- Rob Smith: Poppa Bunny
- Catherine Gallant: Momma Bunny
- Dustin Lauzon: Baby Bunny
- Peter Wildman: Narrator
- Keith Knight: Professor Bunsen
- Dwayne Hill: Bill Uppity
- Linda Kash: Sue Uppity
- Rebecca Brenner: Prissy Uppity
- Norm Spencer: Sly Fox
- Ron Rubin: Yobby
- Neil Crone: Politician
- Nicole Oliver: Felony

=== Episodes ===
No.	Title	Written by	Original release date
1	"One Small Step"	Dale Schott	3 October 1998
2	"Bunny Beach Bonanza"	Dale Schott	10 October 1998
3	"Puddle Muddle"	Laura Kosterski	17 October 1998
4	"The Magic Lamp"	Ken Ross	24 October 1998
5	"Stressed to Impress"	Erika Stobel	31 October 1998
6	"The Case of the Missing Lollapaluzzi"	Bob Ardiel	7 November 1998
7	"Ghost of a Chance"	Laura Kosterski	14 November 1998
8	"Can It"	Timothy Carter	21 November 1998
9	"Keeping Uppity"	Ken Ross	28 November 1998
10	"Lose to Win"	Gerald Tripp	5 December 1998
11	"Run Away Home"	Nicola Barton	12 December 1998
12	"Madly Off in Small Directions"	Ben Joseph	19 December 1998
13	"Bunnies on the Bunnyzon"	Laura Kosterski	26 December 1998
14	"Downtown on the Farm"	Ken Ross	2 January 1999
15	"Smile Trail"	Timothy Carter	9 January 1999
16	"Felony Cleans Up"	Laura Kosterski	16 January 1999
17	"Camp Uppity"	Dave Dias	23 January 1999
18	"Mission Improbable"	Kim Thompson	30 January 1999
19	"Wizdumb"	Ben Joseph	6 February 1999
20	"I'll Be Dumb for Christmas"	Shane MacDougall	13 February 1999
21	"The Prince of Monte Carrot"	Bonnie Chung	20 February 1999
22	"Git Along Little Bunnies"	Bridget Newson	27 February 1999
23	"Situation Vacation"	Shelley Hoffman & Rob Pincombe	6 March 1999
24	"Fear No Bunny"	Laura Kosterski	13 March 1999
25	"May the Bunnies Rise to Meet Ya"	Hugh Duffy	20 March 1999
26	"The Garden of E Dumb"	Dave Dias	27 March 1999
