= I Believe in Science =

Arabic-language website that publishes translations of science articles and research

- Website type: Educational Non-profit
- Available in: Arabic
- Headquarters: Beirut, Lebanon
- Creator: Ahmed Al-Rays
- Website: ibelieveinsci.com
- Commercial: No
- Launched: 2011; 15 years ago (Facebook page); 2013; 13 years ago (ibelieveinsci.com)

I Believe in Science (Arabic: أنا أصدق العلم, romanized: ʾana ʾuṣaddiqu l-ʿilm) is an Arabic-language website dedicated to publishing translations of science articles and research, with the aim of keeping the Arabic speaking world up-to-date with the latest scientific discoveries and accomplishments. The project has amassed more than 2000 volunteers who managed to produce around 15000 scientific articles. Issam Fawaz is the CEO.

== History ==
The project started in 2011 by Ahmed Al-Rayes, an Iraqi geologist living in Lebanon, across social media platforms, the website was established in 2013. They paid tribute to a few of the women who volunteer translating research in March 2015 for International Women's Day. In 2016, the idea became an official NGO registered in both Lebanon and the European Union.

In 2012, the project adopted the slogan: I Believe in Science because it’s the only methodology that actually works

The project goals are:

- Removing and breaking the linguistic barriers that once prevented the Arabic speaking world from reaching true scientific knowledge, by creating a free uninfluenced platform to exchange knowledge and expertise
- Creating and encouraging an environment for the Arab speaking population, that belongs to a hostile culture towards scientific truth, to read and seek scientific knowledge
- Showing the efficiency of the scientific methodology in explaining the biggest phenomena's surrounding us by focusing on objectivity, refutability and applicability of natural sciences and their discoveries

Physicist Lawrence Krauss is among the scientists who have commented favorably on the project.

I think it’s very important that in the Arabic speaking world, what’s going to determine the difference between the countries that are living and the countries that aren’t are the skilled workforce that can appreciate the revolutions taking place in science, not just the abstract areas but also the applied areas, it’s important that people in the Arab world are exposed to such knowledge, and this project is essential for that to happen.

Similarly, biologist Robert Weinberg has said:

I think that this project is a fantastic thing to have, especially that it’s so popular in the Arab world, and this is the beginning of a new scientific revolution in the Arab world.
