= Ricky Ricotta's Mighty Robot =

Novel series by Dav Pilkey

- Logo of the series
- Ricky Ricotta's Mighty Robot: Ricky Ricotta's Mighty Robot vs. the Mutant Mosquitoes from Mercury; Ricky Ricotta's Mighty Robot vs. the Voodoo Vultures from Venus; Ricky Ricotta's Mighty Robot vs. the Mecha Monkeys from Mars; Ricky Ricotta's Mighty Robot vs. the Jurassic Jackrabbits from Jupiter; Ricky Ricotta's Mighty Robot vs. the Stupid Stinkbugs from Saturn; Ricky Ricotta's Mighty Robot vs. the Uranium Unicorns from Uranus; Ricky Ricotta's Mighty Robot vs. the Naughty Nightcrawlers from Neptune; Ricky Ricotta's Mighty Robot vs. the Unpleasant Penguins from Pluto
- Author: Dav Pilkey
- Illustrator: Martin Ontiveros (2000-2006); Dan Santat (2014-2016)
- Cover artist: Martin Ontiveros (2000-2006); Dan Santat (2014-2016)
- Country: United States
- Language: English
- Genre: Children
- Published: 2000–2016
- Media type: Print
- No. of books: 10

Ricky Ricotta's Mighty Robot is a series of illustrated children's books written by Dav Pilkey (best known for his Captain Underpants books). The first seven books were illustrated by Martin Ontiveros and all nine books were illustrated by Dan Santat. In each book, Ricky Ricotta, a mouse, with the help of his mighty robot, saves the world from an evil villain. The books also have an alien animal from a different planet in order from closest-to-sun to furthest-from-sun including Earth, as the villain of the first book is from Earth. The reader could see the villains being jailed in each series and later notice the familiar villains from previous books.

The first three books were initially published under Ricky Ricotta's Giant Robot. For the subsequent books, Dav Pilkey replaced the word "giant" with "mighty" at the recommendation of several readers, who noted that the robot is merely twelve times taller than a mouse, making him about 2.5 feet (76 cm) in height. The first three books were reissued with "Ricky Ricotta's Mighty Robot".

== Novels ==
Order	Title	Year
1	Ricky Ricotta's Mighty Robot	2000/2014
A mouse named Ricky Ricotta is lonely and in need of a friend. An evil scientist named Dr. Stinky McNasty creates a Mighty Robot, but when the Robot refuses to destroy the city of Squeakyville, Dr. Stinky tortures him until Ricky stops Dr. Stinky and saves the Robot. The Robot becomes Ricky's friend, and together they defeat Dr. Stinky and send him to prison.
2	Ricky Ricotta's Mighty Robot vs. the Mutant Mosquitoes from Mercury	2000/2014
Ricky's Mighty Robot helps him out with school, homework, and tests. Meanwhile, fed up with the long hot days and cold nights of Mercury, Mr. Mosquito leads his army of Mutant Mosquitoes to attack Planet Earth. Ricky and his Robot battle the Mutant Mosquitoes and chase them away, but things get tricky when Mr. Mosquito holds Ricky captive in his spaceship.
3	Ricky Ricotta's Mighty Robot vs. the Voodoo Vultures from Venus	2001/2014
After being late for supper, Ricky and his Mighty Robot are punished with no television. Victor Von Vulture and his army of Voodoo Vultures from Venus invade Earth and hypnotize everyone in Squeakyville (except Ricky and his Robot), to feed him and his army of Voodoo Vultures, so it is up to Ricky and his Robot to stop them and save the planet.
4	Ricky Ricotta's Mighty Robot vs. the Mecha-Monkeys from Mars	2002/2014
When Ricky's Mighty Robot wrecks the family minivan by using it as a skateboard, they both have to pay for the damages. The Robot is lured into a trap by Major Monkey from Mars so that he and his Mecha-Monkeys would attack Earth. With help from the Squeakyville Air and Space Association, Ricky travels to Mars to save his friend and the world.
5	Ricky Ricotta's Mighty Robot vs. the Jurassic Jackrabbits from Jupiter	2002/2014
It is Ricky's birthday, and he and his parents are going to the dinosaur museum, though they bring along his cousin Lucy, much to his dismay. General Jackrabbit from Jupiter travels to Earth and steals all the dinosaur skeletons' heads to create Jurassic Jackrabbits to terrorize the city. When they overpower the Robot, Ricky and Lucy work together to save him.
6	Ricky Ricotta's Mighty Robot vs. the Stupid Stinkbugs from Saturn	2003/2015
Ricky and his family have lunch at Lucy's house, where she wants to play princess with him and her pet Jurassic Jackrabbits. She is mistaken for an actual princess by Sergeant Stinkbug and his Stupid Stinkbugs from Saturn who are looking for the ruler of Earth. Having grown gigantic due to Sergeant Stinkbug's Grow-Big Gumballs, it is Ricky's turn to save the day.
7	Ricky Ricotta's Mighty Robot vs. the Uranium Unicorns from Uranus	2005/2015
Following a few attempts in having fun gone awry due to the Robot's big size, Ricky wishes the Robot would have a friend his own size. The Robot is hypnotized and captured by a Ladybot created by Uncle Unicorn from Uranus so that he and his Uranium Unicorns would take over Earth. Once again, Ricky, Lucy, and her Jurassic Jackrabbits have to save the Robot.
8	Ricky Ricotta's Mighty Robot vs. the Naughty Nightcrawlers from Neptune	2016
Ricky and his Robot build a fort to play in, though he ends up sharing it with Lucy. Nimrod Nightcrawler from Neptune uses a "wormhole" portal to teleport to Earth and dig a tunnel causing the ground to cave in and trap the Robot, allowing him and his Naughty Nightcrawlers to attack the city. Ricky and Lucy have to stop the Nightcrawlers and free the Robot.
9	Ricky Ricotta's Mighty Robot vs. the Unpleasant Penguins from Pluto	2016
Ricky is upset at Lucy for filling the backyard pond with pink bubble bath and ends up hurting her feelings, so he and his Robot make an apology gift for her. President Penguin, outraged about his planet Pluto being considered a dwarf planet, leads his Unpleasant Penguins to invade Earth. Lucy mistakes the Penguins' spaceship for Ricky's gift for her.

Activity book:

- Ricky Ricotta's Mighty Robot Astro-Activity Book o' Fun (2006)
