= Dav Pilkey =

American cartoonist and author (born 1966)

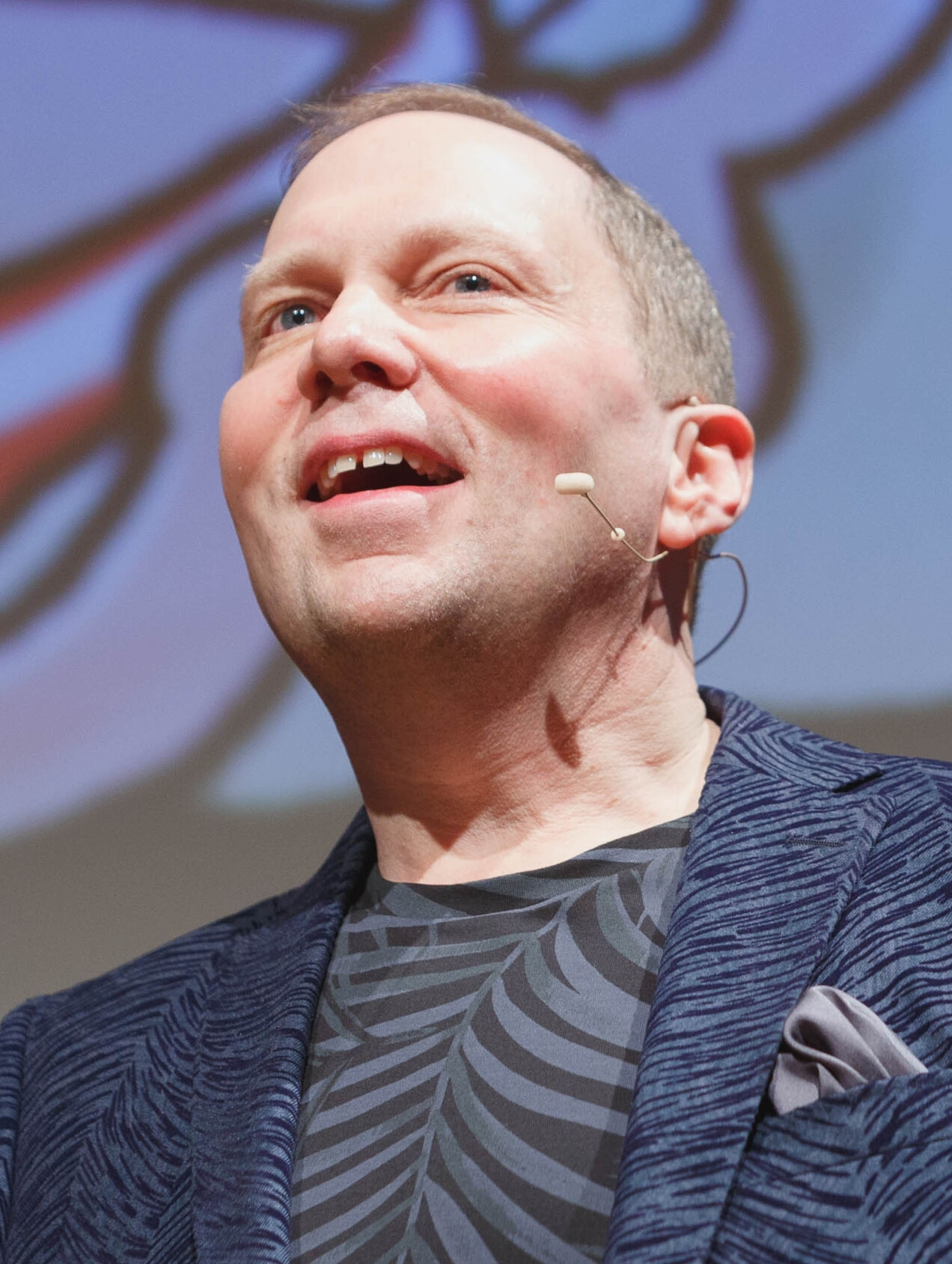
- Pilkey in 2019
- Born: David Murray Pilkey Jr. March 4, 1966 (age 60); Cleveland, Ohio, U.S.
- Occupations: Comic book writer; author; illustrator
- Spouse: Sayuri Pilkey (m. 2005)
- Writing career
- Pen name: Dav Pilkey; George Beard; Harold Hutchins; Sue Denim
- Years active: 1987–present
- Notable works: Dragon series Captain Underpants series Dog Man series Ricky Ricotta's Mighty Robot series Dumb Bunnies series
- Website: pilkey.com Dav Pilkey's voice Pilkey talking about his childhood experiences, recorded October 11, 2019

David Murray "Dav" Pilkey Jr. (/deɪv/; born March 4, 1966) is an American comic book writer, author, and illustrator of children's fiction. He is known as the author and illustrator of the children's book series Captain Underpants and its spin-off children's graphic novel series Dog Man, the latter published under the respective writer and illustrator pen names of George Beard and Harold Hutchins, who are also the two protagonists in the Captain Underpants franchise.

== Life and career ==
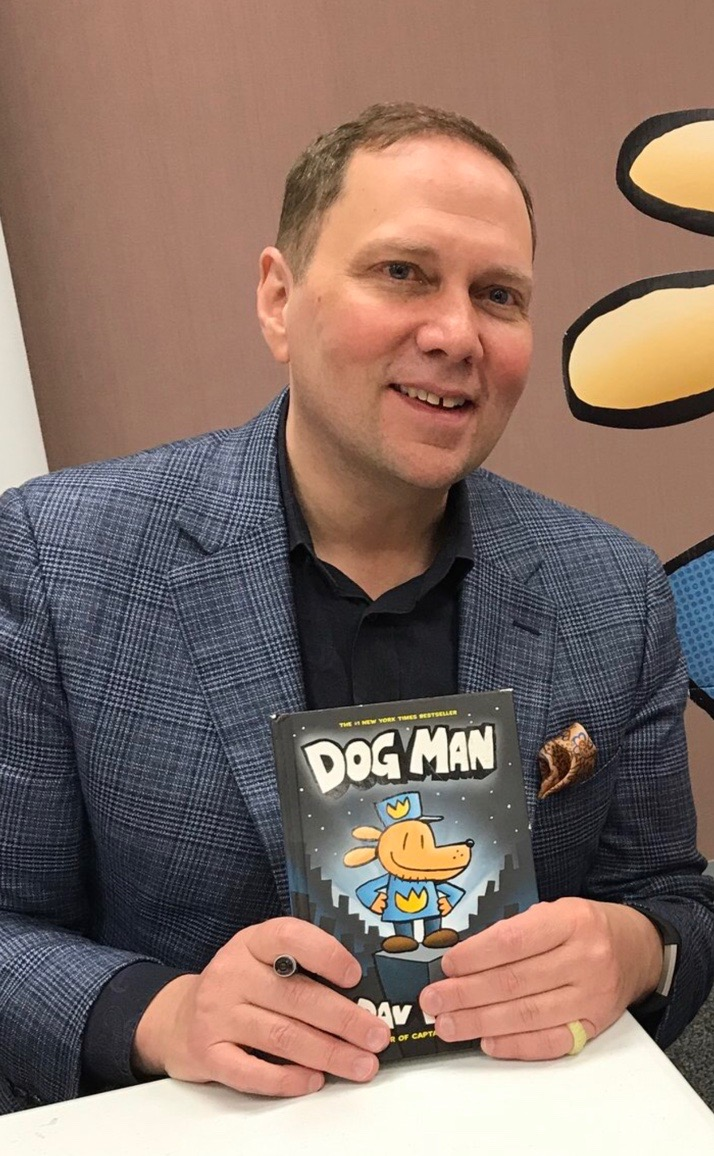
Pilkey in August 2018

Pilkey was born in Cleveland, Ohio, on March 4, 1966, to the Reverend David Pilkey Sr. and Barbara, who was the church organist. He has one older sister. Pilkey was brought up in a conservative Christian household and went to Christian schools throughout his life. Pilkey was diagnosed with attention deficit hyperactivity disorder (ADHD) and dyslexia as a child. While attending elementary school in North Ridgeville, Ohio, Pilkey was frequently reprimanded for his behavior in class and thus usually sat at a desk in the school hallway, where he created the Captain Underpants character.

In 1987, Pilkey wrote his first book, World War Won, an allegorical fable inspired by the nuclear arms race between the United States and the Soviet Union. The book won an award in a national competition for student authors.

The unconventional spelling of Pilkey's first name came from a typo on his name tag while he was working at Pizza Hut.

Pilkey graduated from Kent State University. He married Sayuri Pilkey in 2005.

Captain Underpants was published in 1997. Later, The Adventures of Super Diaper Baby was published in 2002 and was Pilkey's first full complete graphic novel. It appeared at No. 6 on the USA Today bestseller list for all books, both adult and children's, and was also a New York Times bestselling book for Children's Middle Grade. The first Super Diaper Baby graphic novel was published with Scholastic years before Scholastic created the Graphix imprint.

Pilkey took a break from writing for a few years to care for his terminally ill father (who died on November 13, 2008). In 2009, Pilkey made an agreement with Scholastic to publish four new books. The first two are graphic novels: The Adventures of Ook and Gluk: Kung-Fu Cavemen from the Future, released on August 10, 2010; and Super Diaper Baby 2: Invasion of the Potty Snatchers, released on June 28, 2011. Captain Underpants and the Terrifying Return of Tippy Tinkletrousers was released on August 28, 2012, Captain Underpants and the Revolting Revenge of the Radioactive Robo-Boxers was released on January 15, 2013, Captain Underpants and the Tyrannical Retaliation of the Turbo Toilet 2000 was released on August 26, 2014, and Captain Underpants and the Sensational Saga of Sir Stinks-A-Lot was released on August 25, 2015. Additionally, fifteen Dog Man and five Cat Kid Comic Club novels have been published since August 30, 2016.

Pilkey and his wife live on Bainbridge Island, Washington.

On March 25, 2021, Dav Pilkey announced on his YouTube channel that he and Scholastic would cease further publication of the book The Adventures of Ook and Gluk, and would remove it from retailers and libraries due to some characters in the book being stereotypes. Pilkey stated that he intended to showcase diversity, equality, and non-violent conflict resolution. He also stated that even unintentional and passive stereotypes are harmful to everyone. Pilkey will donate his entire advance, past, and future royalties from the book to organizations promoting diversity that are designed to stop violence against Asians.

== Awards ==
- 1986: The National Written and Illustrated by... Awards Contest for Students, ages 14–19 category, World War Won
- 1997: Caldecott Honor Award, The Paperboy
- 1998: California Young Reader Medal, Dog Breath!: The Horrible Trouble with Hally Tosis, published in 1994
- 2007: Disney Adventures Kids' Choice Awards, the Captain Underpants series
- 2016: Milner Award, The favorite children's book author
- 2019: Person of the Year Award from Publishers Weekly
- 2019: Comic Industry Person of the Year

== Publications ==
=== Dragon series ===
- Dragon Gets By (1991)
- A Friend For Dragon (1991)
- Dragon's Merry Christmas (1991)
- Dragon's Fat Cat (1992)
- Dragon's Halloween (1993)

The Dragon series was originally published with Orchard Books. Scholastic then reprinted the series in 2019, with Dragon Gets By, A Friend for Dragon, and Dragon's Fat Cat all compiled in one book, Dragon Tales.

Pilkey used watercolors purchased at a local grocery store to paint the illustrations in these books. The series became a stop-motion animation TV show with 67 episodes from 2004 to 2007.

=== Dumb Bunnies ===
- The Dumb Bunnies (1994)
- The Dumb Bunnies' Easter (1995)
- Make Way for Dumb Bunnies (1996)
- The Dumb Bunnies Go to the Zoo (1997)

Pilkey originally authored the Dumb Bunnies series using the pseudonym Sue Denim. The Dumb Bunnies were made into a television series by Canadian animation studio Nelvana in 1998 and 1999.

=== Captain Underpants ===
- The Really Cool Adventures of Captain Underpants (1989)
- The Adventures of Captain Underpants (September 1, 1997)
- Captain Underpants and the Attack of the Talking Toilets (February 1, 1999)
- Captain Underpants and the Invasion of the Incredibly Naughty Cafeteria Ladies from Outer Space (and the Subsequent Assault of the Equally Evil Lunchroom Zombie Nerds) (September 1, 1999)
- Captain Underpants and the Perilous Plot of Professor Poopypants (July 29, 2000)
- Captain Underpants and the Wrath of the Wicked Wedgie Woman (August 29, 2001)
- Captain Underpants and the Big, Bad Battle of the Bionic Booger Boy, Part 1: The Night of the Nasty Nostril Nuggets (August 1, 2003)
- Captain Underpants and the Big, Bad Battle of the Bionic Booger Boy, Part 2: The Revenge of the Ridiculous Robo-Boogers (September 30, 2003)
- Captain Underpants and the Preposterous Plight of the Purple Potty People (August 15, 2006)
- Captain Underpants and the Terrifying Return of Tippy Tinkletrousers (August 28, 2012)
- Captain Underpants and the Revolting Revenge of the Radioactive Robo-Boxers (January 15, 2013)
- Captain Underpants and the Tyrannical Retaliation of the Turbo Toilet 2000 (August 26, 2014)
- Captain Underpants and the Sensational Saga of Sir Stinks-A-Lot (August 25, 2015)

==== Captain Underpants manga ====
- Captain Underpants: The First Epic Manga (April 7, 2026, as writer)
- Captain Underpants and the Attack of the Talking Toilets: The Second Epic Manga (April 7, 2027, as writer)

=== Captain Underpants spin-offs ===
- The Adventures of Super Diaper Baby (February 5, 2002)
- The Adventures of Ook and Gluk: Kung-Fu Cavemen from the Future (August 10, 2010)
- Super Diaper Baby 2: Invasion of the Potty Snatchers (June 28, 2011)

Pilkey authored Super Diaper Baby and Ook and Gluk under the pseudonyms of George Beard and Harold Hutchins, who are two of the main characters in the Captain Underpants series. In that series, George and Harold write and illustrate comic books together respectively and these are claimed in-story to be some of the comics they produced.

==== Dog Man ====
Dog Man is also a spin-off of Captain Underpants, similarly written and illustrated by George Beard and Harold Hutchins.

- Dog Man (August 30, 2016)
- Dog Man: Unleashed (December 27, 2016)
- Dog Man: A Tale of Two Kitties (August 29, 2017)
- Dog Man and Cat Kid (December 26, 2017)
- Dog Man: Lord of the Fleas (August 28, 2018)
- Dog Man: Brawl of the Wild (December 24, 2018)
- Dog Man: For Whom the Ball Rolls (August 13, 2019)
- Dog Man: Fetch-22 (December 10, 2019)
- Dog Man: Grime and Punishment (September 1, 2020)
- Dog Man: Mothering Heights (March 23, 2021)
- Dog Man: Twenty Thousand Fleas Under The Sea (March 28, 2023)
- Dog Man: The Scarlet Shedder (March 19, 2024)
- Dog Man: Big Jim Begins (December 3, 2024)
- Dog Man: Big Jim Believes (November 11, 2025)
- Dog Man: A Sprinkle In Time (November 3, 2026)

==== Cat Kid Comic Club ====
Cat Kid Comic Club is a spinoff of Dog Man.

- Cat Kid Comic Club (December 1, 2020)
- Cat Kid Comic Club: Perspectives (November 30, 2021)
- Cat Kid Comic Club: On Purpose (April 12, 2022)
- Cat Kid Comic Club: Collaborations (November 29, 2022)
- Cat Kid Comic Club: Influencers (November 28, 2023)
- Cat Kid Comic Club: Selfies (TBA)

=== Ricky Ricotta's Mighty Robot ===
- Ricky Ricotta's Mighty Robot (2000)
- Ricky Ricotta's Mighty Robot vs. the Mutant Mosquitos from Mercury (2000)
- Ricky Ricotta's Mighty Robot vs. the Voodoo Vultures from Venus (2001)
- Ricky Ricotta's Mighty Robot vs. the Mecha Monkeys from Mars (2002)
- Ricky Ricotta's Mighty Robot vs. the Jurassic Jackrabbits from Jupiter (2002)
- Ricky Ricotta's Mighty Robot vs. the Stupid Stinkbugs from Saturn (2003)
- Ricky Ricotta's Mighty Robot vs. the Uranium Unicorns from Uranus (2005)
- Ricky Ricotta's Mighty Robot vs. the Naughty Night Crawlers from Neptune (2016)
- Ricky Ricotta's Mighty Robot vs. the Un-Pleasant Penguins from Pluto (2016)
- Ricky Ricotta's Mighty Robot Astro-Activity Book o' Fun (2016)

=== Big Dog & Little Dog ===
- Big Dog and Little Dog Getting in Trouble (1997)
- Big Dog and Little Dog Wearing Sweaters (1998)
- Big Dog and Little Dog Making a Mistake (1999)
- The Complete Adventures of Big Dog and Little Dog (1999)

=== Other books ===
- World War Won (1987)
- Don't Pop Your Cork on Mondays (1988, illustrator)
- 'Twas the Night Before Thanksgiving (1990)
- The Place Nobody Stopped (1991, illustrator)
- Julius (1993, illustrator)
- Kat Kong (1993)
- Dogzilla (1993)
- Dog Breath!: The Horrible Trouble With Hally Tosis (1994)
- The Moonglow Roll-O-Rama (1995)
- The Hallo-Wiener (1995)
- When Cats Dream (1996)
- God Bless the Gargoyles (1996)
- The Paperboy (1996)
- The Silly Gooses (1998)
- Comics Squad: Recess! (2014, contributor as author/illustrator)
- Guys Read: Terrifying Tales (2015, contributor as author/illustrator)
- One Today (2015, illustrator)

=== Unproduced books ===
- F.A.R.T.S.: The Motion Picture
- The Adventures of Ook and Gluk Jr.: Kung-Fu Cavekids in Outer Space
- Untitled third Ook and Gluk book
- Super Diaper Baby 3: Petey's Revenge.
- The Captain Underpants Cartoon-o-Rama Book 1 Heroes, Villains and Super Creeps
- Frankenfart vs. The Bionic Barf Bunnies from Diarrhea Land
