= Book censorship in the United States =

Censorship of books in the United States

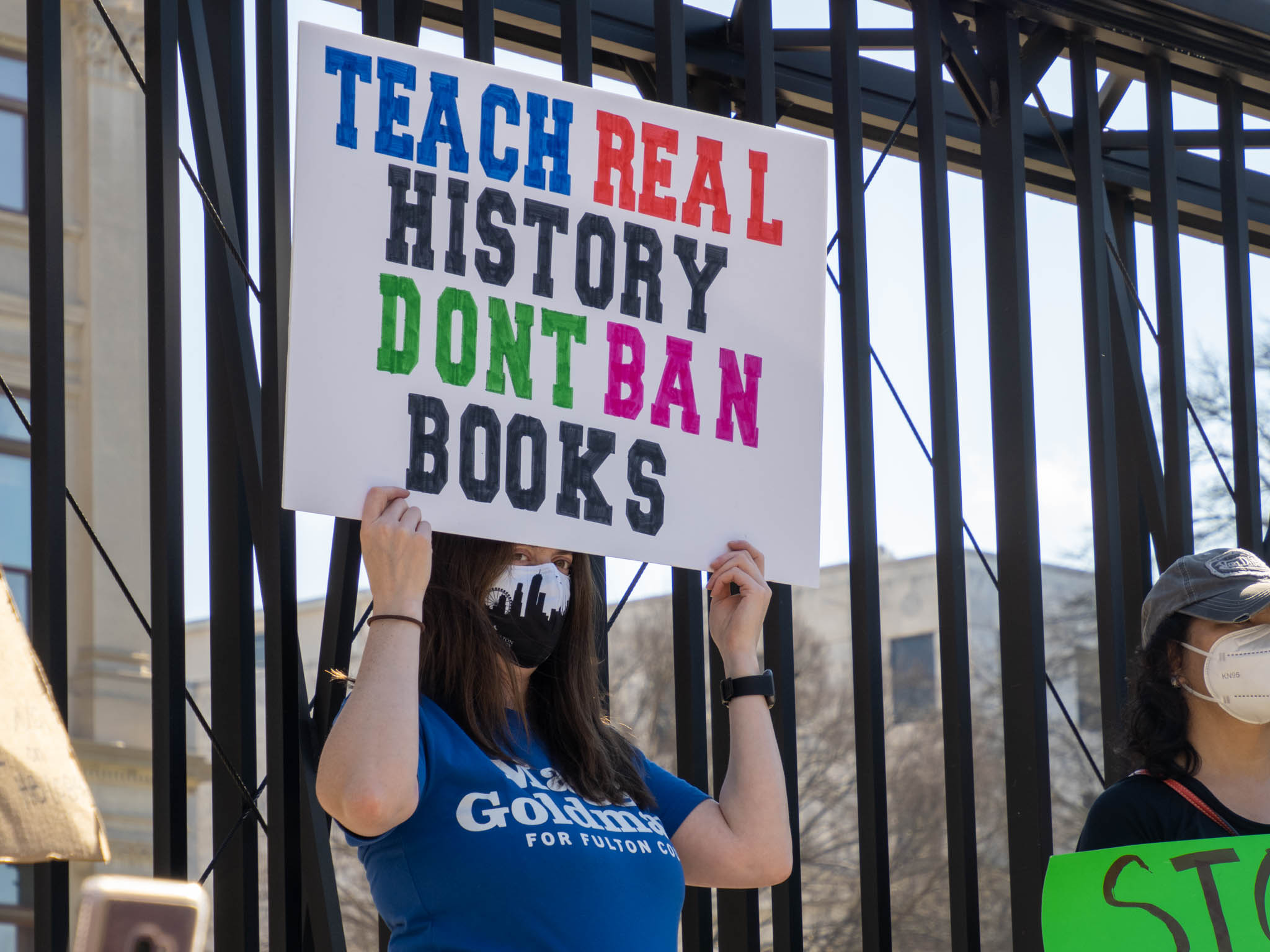
A woman holds her sign of protest at a book banning protest in Atlanta, Georgia, in 2022.

Book censorship in the United States has occurred since European settlement of New England, though censorship increased in volume and intensity in the 20th and 21st centuries, especially in the 2020s.

The first known instance of book censorship in what is now the United States took place in the 1630s in modern-day Massachusetts, when Puritans sought to outlaw New English Canaan. While specific titles caused bouts of book censorship, with Uncle Tom's Cabin frequently cited as the first book subject to a national ban, censorship of reading materials and their distribution remained sporadic in the United States until the Comstock Laws in 1873. In the early 20th century, book censorship became a more common practice and subject of public debate.

Throughout the 20th and early 21st centuries, there have been waves of attempts at widespread book censorship in the US. Beginning in the 2020s, the country has seen a dramatic increase of attempted and successful censorship, with a 63% rise in reported cases between 2022 and 2023. In recent years, about three-fourths of books subject to censorship in the US are for children and teenagers. In the 21st century, targets of censorship may be print, electronic, or audiobooks, or a curriculum that includes such sources. Targeted texts may be held by a business such as a bookstore; a library, either a public library or one located in a school or university; or the school or university as a whole. The entity requesting censorship may be an organization, private individual, or government official.

In the debate over book censorship in the United States, "freedom to read" proponents cite traditions and legal precedent building upon the Constitution of the United States, particularly the First, Fourth, and Fourteenth Amendments. Over the years, much of the justification for censorship has centered on definitions of obscenity and questions about the perceived moral qualities of various books' content. Several professional organizations advocate against book censorship, including the American Library Association (ALA), the National Council of Teachers of English (NCTE), and the American Booksellers Association. Organizations that advocate for removing books from access include Moms for Liberty, No Left Turn for Education, and MassResistance.

== Definition and terminology ==
Book censorship is the act of restricting access to books due to the images, ideas, or information contained, because the individual or organization requesting censorship finds the content objectionable. It refers specifically to attempts to remove or curtail access to a work for a whole population – such as all the children at a school or all the patrons of a public library – and does not include an individual's decision that a book is not appropriate for themselves or their dependents.

Book censorship can take a number of forms. Scholar Emily Knox specifies four types of "active" censorship:

1. Removal: abolishing certain books from the library, classroom, or bookstore shelves;
2. Relocation: moving the specific books to harder-to-access locations within the library, such as creating an "adults only" section;
3. Restriction: limiting access to books or keeping a book in an inaccessible place unless someone gets special permission to view it; and
4. Redaction: striking through or covering sections of materials so they cannot be seen by readers.

Book censorship has often been initiated by a book "challenge," or a request to remove a book from a library or other location. Many libraries and other educational institutions have "reconsideration policies" in place that lay out how to file a challenge and what will happen after one has been filed. These policies exist to make the challenge process transparent and consistent and to support due process. Usually, an administrator or a committee will consider the challenge and the text, and make a determination. If the challenge is supported by the reconsideration process, the book will be removed from the library collection, school, etc. A "banned book" is one that has been "removed from a library, classroom, etc." Since 2021, the rise in book challenges nationwide has had a "chilling effect," leading to increased self-censorship (Knox calls this "passive censorship") by many institutions, often at the level of school districts. Additionally, as of 2024, there has been an increase in state and local legislation that normalizes removal, but also relocation and restriction, of books in libraries, schools, and other settings.

== History ==
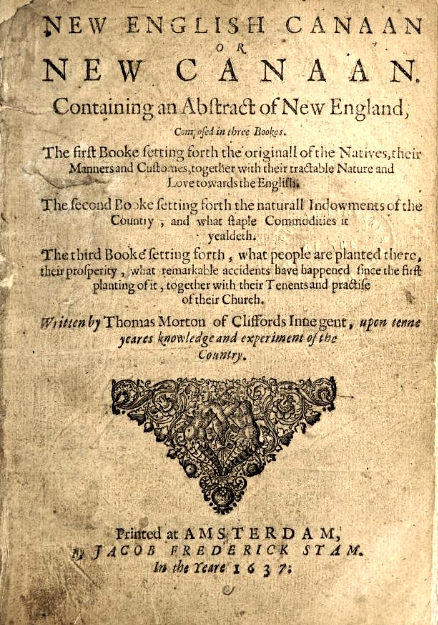
New English Canaan's title page

During the 17th century, a typical form of book censorship in the United States was book burning. What is considered the first book ban in what is now known as the United States was of Thomas Morton's New English Canaan or New Canaan, published in Amsterdam in 1637. That same year, the Puritan government in Quincy, Massachusetts, banned it because they considered it a heretical and harsh critique of Puritan customs and power structures. In October 1650, William Pynchon's pamphlet, The Meritorious Price of Our Redemption, was criticized and promptly burned by the Puritan government. This book burning in Boston, Massachusetts is often referred to and even considered the "first book burning in America."

On March 3, 1873, the United States Congress under the Grant administration passed "An Act for the Suppression of Trade in, and Circulation of, Obscene Literature and Articles of Immoral Use," commonly referred to as the Comstock Law, or Comstock Act. The Act criminalized the use of the U.S. Postal Service to send any of the following items: erotica, contraceptives, abortifacients, sex toys, personal letters alluding to any sexual content or information, or any information regarding the above items. The Act not only restrained the distribution of pornography but also the spread of medical journals that held information regarding contraceptives and abortion. In Washington, D.C., where the federal government has direct jurisdiction, the act also made it a misdemeanor, punishable by fine and imprisonment, to sell, give away, or have in possession any "obscene" publication. Half of the states passed similar anti-obscenity statutes that also banned possession and sale of obscene materials.

The banning of books became more prevalent during the twentieth century as modernist and progressive writers such as James Joyce, Theodore Dreiser, Ernest Hemingway, F. Scott Fitzgerald, and John Steinbeck began their literary careers. Their writing strays greatly from traditionalist literature, the majority of American literature at the time, which depicted good prevailing over evil. These authors did not refrain from revealing their opinions about controversial subject matter. For example, Hemingway's A Farewell to Arms depicts the grim realities of World War I, as well as the story of the two lovers, Frederic Henry and Catherine Barkley, which includes graphic details of a childbirth gone awry. Some cities, including Boston, banned A Farewell to Arms in 1929, labeling the book "salacious."

Boston became a hub of censorship due to the Watch and Ward Society starting with Robert Keable's Simon Called Peter in 1922. Despite books not being barred from transmission through the mail, Boston in the 1920s saw the censorship of the magazine The American Mercury, as well as novels such as Elmer Gantry, An American Tragedy, Lady Chatterley's Lover, and the published text of the play Strange Interlude. The rise of censorship in Boston led to books being advertised as "Banned in Boston" to promote sales throughout the rest of the United States. Eventually, the censorship aroused local opposition. An article in a 1929 issue of The Harvard Crimson stated: "it has become so tiresome to reproach Boston for their constant repression of creative work, that we are beginning to surrender in despair." The end of the censorship started in the 1920s when bookstores started to advocate for people's right to read. Finally, in 1933 in Boston, Judge John M. Woolsey overturned a federal ban of James Joyce's Ulysses, ruling that the depiction of sex should be allowed in "serious literature". This remained an important distinction for the Comstock Law until 1957 in the court case of Roth v. United States, when the definition became books that were "utterly without redeeming social importance". The power of the Watch and Ward Society was slowly transferred to the municipal authorities that better reflected the demographics of Boston that were "more closely linked to the majority leadership of Boston".

After the wave of censorship, Des Moines Public Library director Forrest Spaulding drafted the Library Bill of Rights in 1938 in order to speak out against "growing intolerance, suppression of free speech and censorship affecting the rights of minorities and individuals". This was revised and adopted by the American Library Association just a year later and has expanded to include application to "book banning, gender and race discrimination and exhibit spaces". This idea was expanded upon in 1953 by a group of professionals who defined the "responsibilities of publishers and librarians to protect Americans' freedom to read", which has become a known proclamation: "The freedom to read is essential to our democracy".

Another significant aspect of this time was the resurgence of pro-Confederacy sentiment, specifically in the southern states of the US. A significant result was the attempt and success of banning specific textbooks, led by the United Daughters of the Confederacy. Their purpose was largely to promote the Lost Cause, through mostly untrue and sometimes completely false claims. One of the earlier textbooks targeted by the UDC was American History by David S. Muzzey. It goes against almost all rules that the Rutherford Committee published in their pamphlet in 1919 to further the Lost Cause narrative. Although the UDC targeted it as early as 1916, the North Carolina textbook commission approved it for use in early 1920. By October, the UDC called for the book to be banned state-wide, even though the contract with the publisher would not come up for renewal until 1922, when it was chosen not to be renewed after public pressure.

The state of Georgia created the Georgia Literature Commission in 1953, which initially described its role as aiding local prosecutors in enforcing the state's obscenity laws. In 1958, it gained the power to issue subpoenas and injunctions to stop publication. It censored hundreds of publications but became less powerful after court rulings against it in the 1960s, and was abolished in 1973.

A wave of book censorship has occurred since 2021. In 2022, a report by the American Library Association found that book censorship had increased to unprecedented levels. The report noted that much of the censorship was directed towards books featuring LGBT and racial minority perspectives, and described a growing trend of harassment and intimidation of librarians.

In August 2023, restrictions have been placed on the teaching of Shakespearean plays and literature by Florida teachers in order to comply with state law.

== School boards ==
School boards have frequently been involved in litigation involving the rights of freedom to read, which is considered by some organizations to be encompassed in the First Amendment. Some legal cases have reached state supreme courts and the United States courts of appeals. Cases like Evans v. Selma Union High School District of Fresno County in 1924 ruled "The mere act of purchasing a book to be added to the school library does not carry with it any implication of the adoption of the theory or dogma contained therein, or any approval of the book itself except as a work of literature fit to be included in a reference library." In Minarcini v. Strongsville City School District in 1976, the court upheld the school district's decision to not allow certain texts to be used in a curriculum, but "found the removal of the books from the library to be unconstitutional, referring to the library as a 'storehouse of knowledge.'"

Censorship has also been addressed by the United States Supreme Court in the case Island Trees School District v. Pico in 1982. This case involved the school board removing certain books that it deemed inappropriate. The court came to the conclusion that, "The First Amendment imposes limitations upon a local school board's" discretion to remove books from high and junior high school libraries. The case was brought to the Supreme Court by five students who challenged their school board's decision to remove nine books from the school's library, after a challenge came from an organization called Parents of New York United. The Supreme Court ruled that, under the First Amendment, "Local school boards may not remove books from school library shelves simply because they dislike the ideas contained in those books". Justice William Brennan, who wrote the opinion, reasoned that "Local school boards have broad discretion in the management of school affairs, but such discretion must be exercised in a manner that comports with the transcendent imperatives of the First Amendment". Brennan continues that school boards do have "absolute discretion to choose academic materials" and what texts are used in classrooms, so removing books from the curriculum would not be unconstitutional, as long as a school board's discretion is not "exercised in a narrowly partisan or political manner." Finally, he comments on the library, saying it is a distinct institution as it represents the First Amendment's "role in affording the public access to discussion, debate and the dissemination of information and ideas."

A federal lawsuit based on Island Trees School District v. Pico – identified by the lawsuit as Board of Education v. Pico – was filed against the Escambia County School District and the Escambia County School Board in May 2023.

Banning of books by school leaders from various independent school districts around Texas has seen a growth in recent years. This has resulted in Texas being the state that issued the largest number of book title challenges, according to the American Library Association, in 2022. Houston area schools have begun review and removal of books from the shelves to be reviewed for inappropriate content. Book challenges have even impacted the materials available for purchase in book fairs held in Houston area schools.

Since 2021, 23 states have passed laws or policies censoring higher education. As of 2025, over 50% of college students in the United States are enrolled in a state that has at least one law or policy censoring higher education. This has resulted in a lot of books or material from books being prohibited from college curriculums.

== Carceral censorship ==
Carceral censorship refers to obstructing the flow of literature, information, and knowledge to prison populations. While this form of censorship is less documented than censorship in public K-12 education and public libraries, according to PEN America, carceral censorship is the most pervasive form of literature restriction in the United States. However, because the United States government does not require federal prisons to self-report censored titles or keep records of book challenges, there is a lack of centralized data open to the public regarding the quantity of book restrictions in state prisons or what titles are censored. Moreover, it is not prison or state officials who restrict challenged book titles; instead, it is the mailroom staff of prisons who are responsible for intercepting literature and making lists of censored content.

=== Content-neutral censorship ===
Content-neutral bans restrict "literature for reasons unrelated to its contents—if, for example, it is mailed from a bookseller that the prison has not approved, if it is hardcover and all hardcover books are prohibited, or because the package has a mailing label on it." PEN America found that 84% of prison mailrooms followed the "approved-vendor" policy, which requires literature to be mailed through a publisher or approved vendor directly, even if the content of the literature is neutral and does not threaten the security of the institution.

=== Content-based censorship ===
Content-based bans indicate "rejection of books because of the specific content within them—limiting incarcerated people's access to information and specific ideas by designating them as threats." These threats concern: 1) the security of the prison 2) sexually explicit content 3) race and 4) content of/with non-English languages. Prisons have been known to restrict non-English materials due to a fear that inmates would be able to communicate with one another without the prison guards or authorities understanding what is being said. States such as Washington, Florida, and Virginia have censored all non-English content within their prisons.

Connecticut has censored 334 titles due to security concerns of the inmates and the prison itself, such as the titles My Body, My Limits, My Pleasure, My Choice and Men Unlearning Rape, both educational essays aimed at discouraging cycles of violence in and outside the incarcerated system. Louisiana prisons have also censored similar content, up to 584 titles over a concern for threats of violence and sexual content.

==== Prison Ramen ====
"Prison Ramen" is a cookbook featuring ramen-based recipes that incarcerated individuals can prepare in their cells. Each recipe is paired with a short narrative (mostly from people who have previously been incarcerated) that shares the story behind its creation or recalls a significant moment associated with the dish. The book is prohibited in 19 state prison systems, all states citing its censorship as a measure of security.

== Reasons for censorship ==
Books are challenged for a number of reasons relating to the themes or content, especially as related to being age appropriate. As of the ten years preceding 2016, the top three reasons cited for challenging materials as reported to the Office of Intellectual Freedom were:

1. The material was considered to be "sexually explicit".
2. The material contained "offensive language".
3. The material was "unsuited to any age group".

Even though there has been a rise in book censorship at the library level, an interpretation of ALA's policy, the Library Bill of Rights states "Librarians and governing bodies should maintain that parents – and only parents – have the right and the responsibility to restrict the access of their children – and only their children – to library resources." According to a report by PEN America from data collected June 1 to December 31, 2023, there are four main trends in the types of books being banned:

1. Banning books detailing sexual violence using claims that the books are "obscene"
2. LGBTQ+ books, which made up 36% of all bans from 2021 to 2023, by prohibiting student instruction from including sexual orientation or gender identity
3. Particular focus on transgender narratives due to rhetoric about the alleged harms of "gender ideology"
4. "Critical Race Theory" backlash, such that books about race and racism or books that include characters of color have been framed as "divisive" using the idea that discussing race causes racism

According to the American Library Association (ALA), there are also more than 20 other reasons for censorship. "Sexually explicit" material was the most frequent cause of book challenges in the decade from 1990 to 2000, according to People for the American Way, while "offensive language" was responsible for the second-most number.

=== Sexually explicit ===
Various groups are concerned that sex, in any form, could "encourage children to think about, express interest in, or have sex." This includes, but is not limited to, books giving a sexual education or that contain rape, sexual assault, sexually explicit images, "dirty magazines" (2018), or sexual references. This is often used under the rationale of age appropriateness. For example, in The Catcher in the Rye, an episode with a pimp and a prostitute generally causes hostility towards the novel. Some school boards banned the novel, while others had it listed as restricted and required parental permission. Another example is Margaret Atwood's The Handmaid's Tale. This dystopian novel contains explicit sexual content that many groups have deemed inappropriate for juvenile audiences. It was targeted by parents in Georgia's SB 226 hearing, which would allow school principals and school boards to be the sole decision makers when choosing which books were appropriate for students. Ultimately, SB 226 did not pass and was withdrawn from consideration on March 31, 2021.

This reasoning is also often used to target books with any LGBTQIA+ content, even including books that are not sexually explicit. One example is the children's book And Tango Makes Three, which is about two homosexual penguins in Central Park Zoo. It is often challenged due to homosexuality in the narrative and because it is "unsuited to [its] age group", despite it lacking any sexually explicit scenes.

=== Profanity ===
Another reason for censorship is that the content includes profanity or offensive language. The use of profanity and vulgar language often refers to swear words and is a common reason to attempt a book challenge.

Angie Thomas's The Hate U Give is commonly targeted for its use of the word "fuck". Rainbow Rowell's Eleanor & Park is targeted for vulgar language describing the main characters' difficult home and school environments. In reference to the use of "fuck" in The Hate U Give, Angie Thomas, defended the use by saying, "There are 89 f-words in The Hate U Give; I know because I counted them….[sic] And last year, more than 900 people were killed by police. People should care more about that number than the number of f-words."

=== Race ===
Novels which record stories of racism, are assumed to be teaching "critical race theory", involve racial slurs, or are confusing about the story's position on race are often targeted for censorship. A report by PEN that tracked 1586 book bans between July 2021 and March 2022 showed that 40% of the books banned included characters who are people of color and 21% of the books portrayed issues of race and racism.

Two well-known books that have been challenged, in part on the grounds of including racial slurs, are To Kill a Mockingbird and Adventures of Huckleberry Finn. Although they are both on the Library of Congress' list of "Books that Shaped America", some students were uncomfortable with the language the books used. Proponents of these books, including an alliance that defends freedom of speech, called NCAC, respond that they are "anti-racist stories using historically-accurate racist language." To Kill a Mockingbird confronts issues of rape and racial inequality, but is traditionally a part of the American literary canon because advocates regard its themes as having universal appeal. One challenge to this book occurred in Cherry Hill, New Jersey, when, in 2008, a resident objected to having the book as part of a high school English curriculum. The challenger had problems with how black Americans were treated in the novel and feared that the descriptions might upset black readers. Instead of banning the book, the school board voted unanimously to keep the book in the curriculum and instead provided racial sensitivity training for teachers who used the novel in their classrooms with the intent of supporting all readers.

Critical race theory is a theoretical model that takes into consideration mechanisms through which US laws and institutions sustain racial disparities in society. It most frequently appears in scholarly works used in college and above. Some of the books that have been challenged with claims of critical race theory include Stamped: Racism, Antiracism, and You by Ibram X Kendi, The Hate U Give, and Something Happened in Our Town: A Child's Story About Racial Injustice by Marianne Celano and Marietta Collins. Despite virtually all school districts insisting that they are not teaching critical race theory, many people leading the charge for book censorship are using it as a term to refer to schools' "equity programs" that involve racism-specific and LGBTQ-inclusive policies.

=== Social ===
Numerous books have been suppressed "because of language, racial characterization, or depiction of drug use, social class, or sexual orientation of the characters, or other social differences that the challengers viewed as harmful to the readers." There are many examples of books being suppressed on social grounds in the United States. Dawn Sova authored Literature Suppressed on Social Grounds, an essay that lists books that have been banned or challenged on the preceding grounds to raise awareness of why books are censored. A few examples of this type of censorship are J. D. Salinger's The Catcher in the Rye, Ken Kesey's One Flew Over the Cuckoo's Nest, and Mark Twain's Adventures of Huckleberry Finn. All of these stories have main characters who disrespect authority and do not live according to societal norms and social rules. Holden Caulfield, Randle McMurphy, and Huck Finn are similar in their use of vulgar language and anti-traditionalist worldviews. All of these books have themes of characters who are idolized for breaking the rules and living a life that is full of pleasures instead of listening and adhering to traditional order. Sova suggests that censors have sought to ban these books because they fear that the rebellious nature of the characters will lead children to follow them, meaning they will have no respect for their parents, the law or teachers.

Adventures of Huckleberry Finn (1884) by Mark Twain was listed by the American Library Association as the 5th most commonly banned book in the U.S. due to racism in 2007. NewSouth Books received media attention for publishing an expurgated edition of the work that censored the words nigger and Injun. A parent in a school district in Arizona attempted to have the novel banned in a case that reached the United States Court of Appeals for the Ninth Circuit in the case Monteiro v. The Tempe Union High School District (1998).

In August 1939, the Board of Supervisors of Kern County, California passed a resolution to ban The Grapes of Wrath from county libraries and schools. The head librarian of the Kern County Free Library, Gretchen Knief, despite personally protesting to the supervisors, complied with the ban. The ban is said to have been largely a product of the county's reliance upon agriculture, and Knief's compliance, along with a lack of official support from librarians. The ban was rescinded in 1941.

In September 2020, the Burbank Unified School District in California removed from required reading To Kill a Mockingbird, Adventures of Huckleberry Finn, Of Mice and Men, The Cay, and Roll of Thunder, Hear My Cry from middle school and high school curriculum after parents showed concerns over racism.

=== Political ===
The State Department, the Central Intelligence Agency and the Federal Bureau of Narcotics successfully sought to suppress an academic work, The China Lobby in American Politics, by Ross Y. Koen, about the influence of the China lobby in Congress and the executive branch of the US Government, and about heroin trafficking by the Chinese Nationalist Party, then the ruling party of the military dictatorship in Taiwan. The suppression was instigated by the Chinese Nationalist Party through their embassy, after they initially threatened a libel suit against the publisher, MacMillan.

Books have been suppressed for their political content by local governments and school districts. In particular, books that some perceive to promote anarchism, communism or socialism have a history of being suppressed in the United States. The Communist Manifesto by Karl Marx and Friedrich Engels was frequently challenged and widely restricted in libraries because of its communist ideas, especially during the Red Scare in the 1950s. George Orwell's Nineteen Eighty-Four was challenged in Jackson County, Florida in 1981 because it was deemed "pro-communist and contained explicit sexual matter." In 1980, Irwin Schiff published the Federal Mafia, which was found to be fraudulent by the Ninth Circuit Court of Appeals.

=== Religion ===
Many books have been challenged for religious reasons throughout the history of the United States. People challenging books on religious grounds may feel that a text attacks, disagrees with, or conflicts with specific beliefs. Sometimes, books contain different religious beliefs than the person reading them. One famous example is On the Origin of Species by Charles Darwin. The Butler Act, enacted in Tennessee in 1925, made it illegal for schools to teach content that conflicted with the Book of Genesis' account of human origin. Evolution is a scientific theory coming from the book that many people perceived as conflicting with the Bible, and thus Darwin's book was banned. This law was upheld until 1967. Another controversy about this happened in 2017 in Florida, where HB 909 Instructional Materials allowed any resident of a county to submit a challenge to any K-12 instructional materials. Opponents to the law were concerned about the disruptions to teaching science and evolution in the classroom.

Many popular fantasy works have also been challenged due to the presence of witchcraft. Often, there are perceptions that the works of fiction promote witchcraft and the occult. Two examples are the Harry Potter series and Roald Dahl's The Witches. While neither of these attack or disagree with Christianity, some Christian groups feel that reading about witchcraft will inspire children to behave in ways antithetical to their faith. Students in the Cedarville School District were restricted from checking out the Harry Potter series without parental permission. Soon after the enacting of this rule, it was challenged by the parents of 4th grade student Dakota Counts, claiming that it infringed upon their daughter's Constitutional rights. The ensuing 2003 court case, Counts v. Cedarville School District, resulted in the court reversing the restriction and finding in favor of the parents. Scholastic, a book publisher for schools, released a statement about the case, claiming that the books teach children about right and wrong and good and evil. In 2007, there was another challenge to having the Harry Potter series in classrooms of public schools in Lawrenceville, Georgia. Ultimately, the school board unanimously decided to keep the books in the classroom under the defense that they have the potential to spark creativity, imagination, and a love for learning and reading.

=== Security ===
Operation Dark Heart, a 2010 memoir by U.S. Army intelligence officer Lt. Col. Anthony Shaffer, was the subject of attempts by the Defense Department to censor information that the book revealed, even after it had already been distributed free of changes. Both censored and original copies of the book are in the public domain.

== Examples ==
=== Brave New World ===
Aldous Huxley's dystopian novel, Brave New World (1931), was challenged in some school districts. In 2003, in the South Texas Independent School District, Mercedes, Texas, it "was challenged but retained". Parents had "objected to the adult themes—sexuality, drugs, suicide—that appeared in the novel. Huxley's book was part of the summer Science Academy curriculum. The board voted to give parents more control over their children's choices by requiring principals to automatically offer an alternative to a challenged book."

=== Of Mice and Men ===
John Steinbeck's Of Mice and Men, first published in 1937, is considered an American classic and listed as the 12th best novel of the 20th century by the Radcliffe Publishing Course. It has remained a frequent choice for teaching in English curricula because of its simplistic nature, but profound message. Nevertheless, the novel appeared on the ALA's top ten most frequently challenged books in 2001, 2003 and 2004. Herbert Foerstel, the author of Banned in the U.S.A., a book documenting the cases of censorship in the United States, states that "the censors claim to be protecting the young and impressionable from this tragic tale of crude heroes speaking vulgar language within a setting that implies criticism of our social system." The main reasons for censorship, as observed by the Office of Intellectual Freedom, are "offensive language, racism, unsuited to age group, violence".

A case against the novella began in Normal, Illinois, in 2004 when a group of parents and community members in the school district proposed a set of books that could be read instead of Steinbeck's novel that addressed the same themes as Of Mice and Men, but did not have the racial slurs that the group objected to. The group also suggested that the book should be removed from the permanent, required reading list for a sophomore English curriculum; however, they did not ask that the book be banned. The group appreciated that the novel addressed injustices of the past, but believed the alternative books that they proposed "address multicultural and socially sensitive issues in a meaningful, respectful manner", whereas Steinbeck's novel does not.

=== To Kill a Mockingbird ===
To Kill a Mockingbird (1960), by Harper Lee, won the Pulitzer Prize and has since been considered an American classic. The novel confronts issues of rape and racial inequality, but is highly regarded for its universal themes that can appeal to many readers. The novel has been censored since its 1960 publication and appeared on the ALA's top ten most frequently challenged books in 2009 and 2011. The novel was considered objectionable because it deals with racial injustice, class systems, gender roles, and loss of innocence while discussing violence, rape, incest and authority, while using strong language. In July 1996, the Superintendent of the Moss Point School District in Mississippi announced To Kill a Mockingbird would be reviewed by a group of parents, community members and teachers after a complaint came from Reverend Greg Foster about the novel's racial descriptions and discussion of sexual activity. The novel was ultimately banned from being accessed in the school district. Another case began with a resident in Cherry Hill, New Jersey, in 2008, who objected to having To Kill a Mockingbird as part of a high school English curriculum. The challenger had problems with how African Americans were treated in the novel and feared that the descriptions might upset black students who were reading the novel. Instead of banning the book, the school board voted unanimously to keep the book in the curriculum and instead responded to fears of upsetting black students with racial sensitivity training for teachers who used the novel in their classrooms.

=== The China Lobby in American Politics ===
In 1960, The China Lobby in American Politics, by scholar Ross Y. Koen, was suppressed by the State Department, the Central Intelligence Agency and the Federal Bureau of Narcotics at the behest of the ruling Chinese Nationalist Party of Taiwan. The book is about the influence of the China lobby in the US Congress and federal government. It also documents heroin trafficking by the Chinese Nationalist Party – then the ruling party of the military dictatorship in Taiwan. Koen detailed considerable evidence of this, and it was later corroborated by other scholars. The Chinese Nationalist Party instigated the suppression through their embassy in Washington, after they had initially threatened a libel suit against the publisher, Macmillan. After 4000 copies of the book had been printed, at the intervention of the State Department, the publisher recalled the book and discontinued publication. Some copies of the book nevertheless found their way into rare book repositories at universities. Right-wing groups stole many remaining copies of the book from libraries. The book was reprinted in 1974 after other scholars had shown Koen's findings to be accurate.

=== The Catcher in the Rye ===
The Catcher in the Rye, by J.D. Salinger, was first published in 1951 and has since been both frequently challenged and taught. In the 1980s, it "had the unusual distinction of being the nation's most frequently censored book, and, at the same time, the second most frequently taught novel in the public schools." The American Library Association deemed it the most censored book from 1966 to 1975 and the tenth most challenged book from 1990 to 1999. The novel also appears as the second best and most classic novel of the 20th century based on a list developed by the Radcliffe Publishing Course.

The majority of the objections have been over the novel's language, but the book also has mentions of prostitution, sexuality, and underage drinking, as cited by the book review published by the organization Focus on the Family, an American conservative group. The ALA cites the reasons for censorship as "offensive language, sexually explicit, unsuited to age group". The first case of censorship the book ever witnessed was in 1960 when it was banned in a Tulsa, Oklahoma school district and the eleventh grade teacher who had assigned the book was fired because of the questionable content of the book. A case in Paris, Maine in 1996 allowed for The Catcher in the Rye to continue being taught at the district high school, but mandated practices that would tell parents what books their children read, ultimately leaving it in the hands of parents to decide what their children should read, rather than the school.

=== The CIA and the Cult of Intelligence ===
The CIA and the Cult of Intelligence (1974), written by former CIA and Department of State officers Victor Marchetti and John D. Marks, was the first book to have been censored by federal courts prior to publication. The authors notably fought the CIA's order to censor 399 passages of the book, with the courts eventually settling on 168 censored passages. This book was a bestseller which is considered to have led to the creation of the Church Committee, a United States Senate select committee to study governmental operations with respect to intelligence activities.

=== Fun Home ===
In October 2006, a resident of Marshall, Missouri attempted to have the graphic novel Fun Home by Alison Bechdel removed from the Marshall Public Library. The book addresses themes of sexual orientation, gender roles, suicide, emotional abuse, dysfunctional family life, and the role of literature in understanding oneself and one's family. These challenges are significant because the fact that they are filled with illustrations makes them more likely to be accessible to younger children, and therefore, more susceptible to challenges when the content is considered mature for the audience.

=== Melissa ===
In 2018, 2019, and 2020, Alex Gino's book, Melissa, was reported as the most challenged book in public education according to the American Library Association's annual top ten challenged books. The book was challenged for its "LGBTQIA+ content," yet censors provided other stated reasons for challenging the novel, for instance, "for conflicting with a religious viewpoint" and "traditional family structure" and potentially "creating confusion."

=== Captain Underpants series ===
Dav Pilkey's Captain Underpants is a twelve-book-long illustrated children's novel series that revolves around two fourth-grade boys named George Beard and Harold Hutchins, and the misadventures that ensue after they hypnotize their mean principal, Mr. Krupp, into believing he's the superhero Captain Underpants. All books in the series have faced bans, and the American Library Association reported them as being among the most challenged books in 2013 and 2014. The books were most commonly banned due to assertions that the main characters are disrespectful to authority and that the humor is inappropriate. The twelfth book resulted in increased efforts to censor it due to it revealing that one of the main characters, Harold, is gay.

=== The Perks of Being a Wallflower ===
The Perks of Being a Wallflower, written by Stephen Chbosky, tells the story of a high school freshman named Charlie, who is shy, intelligent, and introspective. The book highlights Charlie's experiences regarding beginning high school and falling in love, but also includes moments of grief and references to sexual abuse. Despite the messages of self-discovery and acceptance, as well as the emphasis on friendship, the book was banned or challenged every year between 2003 and 2017, and later in 2019, 2022, 2023, and 2024. In 2024, the novel was tied with Toni Morrison's The Bluest Eye as the third most challenged book in the country.

== Organizations opposing book censorship ==
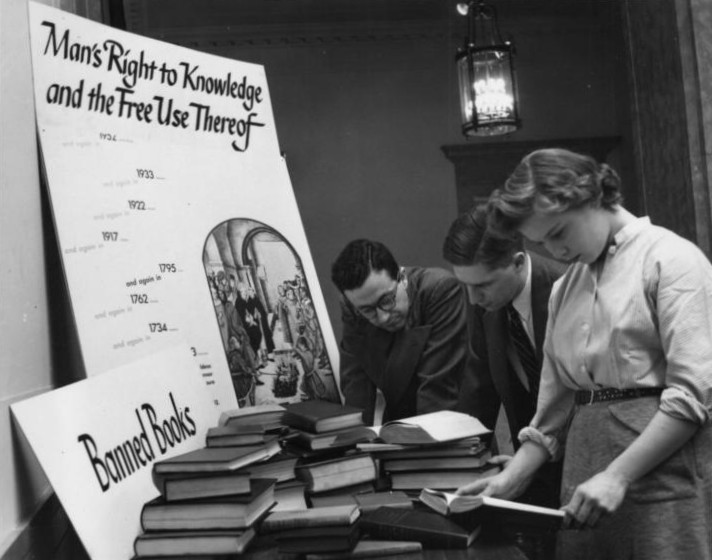
A display on banned books at a Columbia University Bicentennial exhibit, 1954. The theme of the bicentennial was "Man's Right to Knowledge and the Free Use Thereof".

Established in 1876, the American Library Association is the oldest and largest library association in the world "to provide leadership for the development, promotion and improvement of library and information services and the profession of librarianship in order to enhance learning and ensure access to information for all." The American Library Association's website has observed that the top three reasons for book censorship in the United States are that: the material was considered to be "sexually explicit", the content contained "offensive language", or the book was "unsuited to any age group."

Founded by members of the American Library Association on November 20, 1969, the Freedom to Read Foundation focuses more on the legal issues regarding book censorship. One of their main objectives is "to supply legal counsel, which counsel may or may not be directly employed by the Foundation, and otherwise to provide support to such libraries and librarians as are suffering legal injustices." The association made its first U.S. Supreme Court appeal in Kaplan v. California; the case involved an "adult" bookstore owner who was convicted of "violating a California obscenity statute by selling a plain-covered unillustrated book containing repetitively descriptive material of an explicitly sexual nature." The Freedom to Read Foundation brought the case before the Supreme Court and filed "a motion asking the Court to consider an amicus brief addressing constitutional questions posed by the new three-prong test for obscenity in Miller v. California." The motion was ultimately denied as the Court ruled that First Amendment rights only applied to "serious literature or political works".

=== Banned Books Week ===
On ALA's website, there is a section of "Banned & Challenged Books" and they release most banned and challenged books every year; however, they also organize Banned Books Week, "an annual event celebrating the freedom to read" which usually takes place during the last week of September. Banned Books Week is the product of a national alliance between organizations that strive to bring awareness to banned books. Founded by the First Amendment and library activist Judy Krug and the Association of American Publishers in 1982, the event aims to bring banned books "to the attention of the American public". By the year 2000, the intention of this event expanded to "bring[ing] together the entire book community; librarians, booksellers, publishers, journalists, teachers, and readers of all types, in shared support of the freedom to seek and to express ideas, even those some consider unorthodox or unpopular." The coalition that now sponsors the week each year consists of the American Library Association (ALA), the American Booksellers Association, American Booksellers Foundation for Free Expression (ABFFE), Association of American Publishers, American Society of Journalists and Authors, and has support from the Center for the Book in the Library of Congress. Banned Books Week has expanded its goals to include advocating for literary freedom in schools, libraries, and all places involving books. Its most current goal is "to teach the importance of our First Amendment rights and the power of literature, and to draw attention to the danger that exists when restraints are imposed on the availability of information in a free society". Banned Books Week has expanded from just books to addressing the filtering of any academic material by schools or lawmakers. This includes software that removes services such as YouTube, social media, and games. The American Association of School Librarians stance on all filtering is that it is important for students to go past "the requirements set for by the Federal Communications Commission in its Child Internet Protection Act".

However, while the week receives a positive reception, that does not mean it is without criticism. Tom Minnery, vice president of Focus on the Family, claims that "the ALA has irresponsibly perpetrated the 'banned' books lie for too long" and that "nothing is 'banned'" and Ruth Graham from Slate magazine agrees. She thinks that celebrating Banned Books Week conflates issues of book censorship in a public library versus a school library, where actual cases of censorship are rather minimal. Groups that generally challenge numerous books, such as Focus on the Family, often stand opposed to Banned Books Week, but that does not mean everyone is. Maddie Crum, a writer for the Huffington Post, argues in defense of the week, stating that the week helps to keep people aware of the fact that Americans' right of free expression is often limited and in many cases not easily won.

== Voices of banned authors ==
=== John Green ===
American author John Green's novel Looking for Alaska has been challenged due to "offensive language" and "sexually explicit descriptions". Defending his work, Green says that the novel "is arguing really in a rather pointed way that emotionally intimate kissing can be a whole lot more fulfilling than emotionally empty oral sex." The ALA protects him, stating that "challenges do not simply involve a person expressing a point of view; rather, they are an attempt to remove material from the curriculum or library, thereby restricting the access of others. As such, they are a threat to freedom of speech and choice."

=== David Guterson ===
David Guterson's first novel Snow Falling on Cedars was listed as one of the most banned books, having been compared to pornography and described as sexually inappropriate. When he was writing his second novel, Guterson said that it was "always hard to write another book" and that he was "deathly afraid" of having his books banned.

=== Jason Reynolds ===
Jason Reynolds cowrote two of the young adult novels—All American Boys and Stamped: Racism, Antiracism, and You—included on the 2020 and 2019 ALA's top ten challenged books annual list. He responded to these censors in an NPR interview, saying, "It's painful to me because what I know is that when these books are banned, there are going to be thousands and thousands of young people who will not get these books."

=== Dav Pilkey ===
Dav Pilkey is the author and illustrator of the Captain Underpants series, which has been frequently banned due to inappropriate humor, disrespect to authority, and the inclusion of a gay character in the final book. In response to the act of banning books, Pilkey stated: "I understand that people are entitled to their own opinions about books, but it should be just that: a difference of opinion. Instead of saying 'I don't think children should read this book,' just add a single word: 'I don't think my children should read this book.'"

In the Captain Underpants spin-off book The Adventures of Super Diaper Baby, Pilkey included a "subliminal message" that reads: "Think for yourself. Question authority. Read banned books! Kids have the same constitutional rights as grown-ups!!! Don't forget to boycott standardized testing!!!"

== See also ==
- Book banning in the United States (2021–present)
- Book censorship
- Books in the United States
- Censorship of school curricula in the United States
- Censorship of student media in the United States
- Comics Code Authority
- Campbell v. St. Tammany Parish School Board
- List of books banned by governments
- Lists of banned books
- List of most commonly challenged books in the United States
- Proposed bans of LGBT-themed books in the United States
