= Watch and Ward Society =

New England Watch and Ward Society
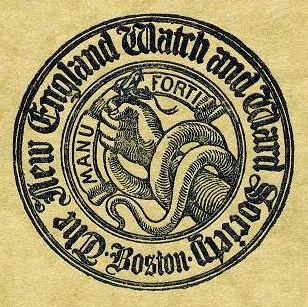
- Formation: 1879
- Dissolved: 1975
- Type: morality activist
- Headquarters: Boston, Massachusetts
- Region served: New England

The New England Watch and Ward Society (founded as the New England Society for the Suppression of Vice) was a Boston, Massachusetts, organization involved in the censorship of books and the performing arts from the late 19th century to the middle of the 20th century. After the 1920s, its emphasis changed to combating the spread of gambling. In 1957 the organization's name was changed to the New England Citizens Crime Commission, and in 1967 it became the Massachusetts Council on Crime and Correction. In 1975 it was merged with another organization to form Community Resources for Justice, a group that promotes prison reform and rights for formerly incarcerated persons.

At the height of the society's power in the late 19th and early 20th centuries, the Boston Public Library kept books that had been deemed objectionable in a locked room, publishers and booksellers held back publications for fear of the organization's influence with prosecutors and judges, and plays were performed in a bowdlerized "Boston Version". The society's activities contributed to the popularization of the phrase "Banned in Boston", which became a target of parody and a marketing slogan.

== Founding and naming ==
The New England Society for the Suppression of Vice was founded in 1878 by a meeting of Boston residents following a speech given by Anthony Comstock. Comstock had founded the New York Society for the Suppression of Vice in 1873 as a vehicle for a crusade against numerous perceived ills of society, and sought to establish chapters of the organization in other cities. The New England Society was to be the first such chapter. The meeting, attended by more than 400 men (women were denied admittance due to the subject matter), elected a committee of eight men to run the organization. Its first agent was Henry Chase, hired in 1882; he served the society for more than 20 years, and the president of the society for many of its early years was Frederick Baylies Allen, an Episcopal minister. The society's membership was open to anyone making contributions of $5 or more; according to historian Paul Boyer, the membership was "almost a roll call of [Boston] Brahmin aristocracy". The society held its first annual meeting in Boston's Park Street Church in 1879. In 1891, it was renamed the Watch and Ward Society after an old volunteer police force, adopting the mission to "watch and ward off evildoers." It was headquartered on School Street, circa 1890s-1900s.

At the height of the society's power, the Boston Public Library kept books that had been deemed objectionable in a locked room, publishers and booksellers held back publications for fear of the organization's influence with prosecutors and judges, and plays were performed in a bowdlerized "Boston Version". Elsewhere, the phrase, "Banned in Boston," became a target of parody and a marketing slogan.

In 1882, the society played a role in instigating obscenity charges against Walt Whitman's Leaves of Grass. In 1903 they went to court to prevent booksellers from advertising Boccaccio's The Decameron and Rabelais' Gargantua and Pantagruel, but lost the case. In 1907, they successfully backed obscenity charges against Elinor Glyn's Three Weeks.

== 1920s-1930s ==
In 1922, the society had Robert Keable's Simon Called Peter removed from a library, and in 1923, used its influence to suppress distribution of Floyd Dell's Janet March.

In 1926, the society challenged a Herbert Asbury story called Hatrack, published in H.L. Mencken's American Mercury. In Boston, with police, press, and a large crowd in attendance, Mencken sold a copy of the magazine to society secretary J. Frank Chase. Mencken was arrested. In the ensuing trial, the magazine was found not to be obscene, and Mencken was acquitted. Mencken proceeded to successfully sue the Watch and Ward Society for illegal restraint of trade. Chase died later that year, and the society's influence began to decline.

In 1928, the society blacklisted Aldous Huxley's Point Counter Point and Voltaire's Candide. In 1929, it went after Erich Maria Remarque's All Quiet on the Western Front on the grounds of offensive language. That same year, in a decisive case, it failed to ban Theodore Dreiser's An American Tragedy. In 1933 the society moved its headquarters to no.41 Mount Vernon Street. In 1934, the society suppressed John O'Hara's Appointment in Samarra. In 1935, it banned Lillian Hellman's play The Children's Hour. In one of its final acts of censorship, in 1950, the society took aim at Erskine Caldwell's God's Little Acre.

== End of the organization ==
Dwight Spaulding Strong (1906–2004) became director of the society in 1948, and redirected its focus, choosing to emphasize action on gambling and other vices, the rehabilitation of criminals, and the study of social issues that lead to crime. In 1957, the organization's name was changed to the New England Citizens Crime Commission, and in 1975 it was merged with the Massachusetts Correctional Association to form the Crime and Justice Foundation, which later became Community Resources for Justice, a group that promotes prison reform and rights for ex-convicts. The remnants of the Watch and Ward Society's endowments were propagated through all of these organizations.
