= CRJ =

CRJ may refer to:

- Bombardier CRJ (Canadair Regional Jet), a family of Canadian commercial jet aircraft
  - CRJ100/200/440, 50 seats
  - CRJ700/900/1000, 70–100 seats
- CRJ, the ICAO airline designator of Air Cruzal, an Angolan airline
- CRJ, the Indian Railways station code for Chittaranjan railway station, Jharkhand, India
- Community Resources for Justice
- Carly Rae Jepsen (born 1985), a Canadian singer
