= American Booksellers for Free Expression =

- Abbreviation: ABFE
- Formation: 1990
- Merger of: American Booksellers Foundation for Free Expression; American Booksellers Association
- Director: David Grogan
- Parent organization: American Booksellers Association
- Website: https://www.bookweb.org/abfe-free-speech
- Formerly called: American Booksellers Foundation for Free Expression

American Booksellers for Free Expression (ABFE) is a non-profit organization operating as the advocacy wing of the American Booksellers Association (ABA) to promote free speech and expression in the United States. The organization was founded in 1990 as the American Booksellers Foundation for Free Expression (ABFFE). In 2015, the ABFFE merged with the ABA and became ABFE. The organization works at both the national level and at local levels to support individuals who voice opposition to book challenges and bans. ABFE also provides resources and education to booksellers, politicians, the press, and the public on the importance of free expression.

The current director of ABFE is David Grogan, who took over the role in 2018. The previous director was Chris Finan, who served as director of the National Coalition Against Censorship (NCAC) from 2017 until his retirement in 2023.

== Legal work ==
=== Legal work as ABFFE (1990-2015) ===
The predecessor to the ABFE, the American Booksellers Foundation for Free Expression, participated in legal cases involving the First Amendment and free speech. They filed an amicus brief in the Supreme Court case US v Stevens (2010); filed a brief in Federal Communications Commission v. Fox Television Stations (2009); and filed briefs in The American Academy of Religion, Association of American University Presses, PEN American Center, Ramadan v Chertoff et al. and Trump v O’Brien.

ABFFE was active in a five-year campaign to restore reader privacy safeguards affected by the USA PATRIOT Act. ABFFE tracked all cases of attempts by law enforcement to seize bookstore records during that period.

=== Legal work as ABFE (2015-Present) ===
American Booksellers for Free Expression participates in legal cases involving First Amendment rights and Fourteenth Amendment rights. The organization also participates in coalitions dedicated to the defense of free expression through organizing and legal advocacy, such as the Free Expression Network (FEN).

In 2022, the ABFE was part of a coalition of booksellers' organizations which brought a lawsuit against the state of Texas challenging a new censorship law called the Restricting Explicit and Adult-Designated Educational Resources (READER) Act which would have imposed a restrictive content-based rating system on books sold to school libraries in the state. In January 2024, the U.S. Court of Appeals for the Fifth Circuit upheld a lower court's ruling in favour of the plaintiffs, blocking enforcement of the law on the grounds that the READER Act is unconstitutional. In July 2022, the ACLU brought forward a motion to dismiss in Virginia on behalf of the ABFE and other organizations, in response to a lawsuit which argued that Gender Queer: A Memoir by Maia Kobabe and A Court of Mist and Fury by Sarah J. Maas are obscene and therefore sales of the book should be restricted. In August 2022, a Virginia state judge threw out the lawsuit, again on the grounds of unconstitutionality.

== Activities ==
American Booksellers for Free Expression is a sponsor of the annual Banned Books Week event in the United States. The organization also participates in planning the event. The purpose of Banned Books Week is to serve as a statement on the value of intellectual freedom in reading and to highlight the challenges faced by books and authors that have been subject to censorship or restriction. The event's organizers and sponsors aim to raise awareness and promote discussions about the importance of open access to diverse ideas and perspectives in literature.

ABFE also sponsors the Kids’ Right to Read Project, a collaboration with the National Coalition Against Censorship, which "offers support, education, and advocacy to people facing book challenges or bans and engages local activists in promoting the freedom to read."

The organization maintains an "Oppositions Map", which is published on the ABA's website. The map tracks states which have introduced legislation which "threatens the right to free expression", as well as the ABFE's attempts to defeat said legislation. The organization also tracks and publishes book challenges.

In 2020, the ABFE put out a statement denouncing the backlash against controversial novel American Dirt. The promotional book tour for the novel had been cancelled due to widespread threats of boycott and alleged threats of physical violence towards the author.

In 2023, the ABFE published The ABA Right to Read Toolkit: How Booksellers and Readers Can Resist Book Bans. The document is freely available to read and download. It contains information about the history of and intentions behind book bans, advice on how to resist book bans (including advice about how to execute tactics such as read-ins, and how to deal with online harassment), and information about the activities of the ABFE and the ABA.

== See also ==
- American Booksellers Foundation for Free Expression v. Strickland
- Book censorship
