= Campbell v. St. Tammany Parish School Board =

United States Court of Appeals case

Campbell v. St. Tammany Parish School Board, 64 F.3d 184 (5th Cir. 1995), was a United States Court of Appeals, Fifth Circuit case involving a First Amendment challenge to the removal of a book from public school libraries. The decision was overruled in 2025 by the en banc Fifth Circuit in Little v. Llano County.

== Facts ==
In 1992, a parent of a seventh-grade student enrolled in a St. Tammany Parish junior high school filed a complaint about the inclusion of the book Voodoo & Hoodoo by Jim Haskins in the school library. The St. Tammany Parish School Board voted 12–2 to remove the book from all their school libraries. Parents of several students sued, alleging that, based on 42 U.S.C. § 1983 and 28 U.S.C. § 2201, the Board's removal of the book violated their children's First Amendment rights. The district court granted summary judgment in the parents' favor.

== Opinion ==
The Fifth Circuit analyzed the case in light of the 1982 United States Supreme Court decision Island Trees School District v. Pico, focusing on the school board's motivation to determine whether the removal of the book from the libraries violated students' First Amendment rights. The court found insufficient facts in the lower court's record to support summary judgment, and remanded on the issue of whether the school board's decision went beyond the bounds of constitutional discretion.

== Impact ==
The Fifth Circuit's decision signaled the lasting impact of Island Trees School District v. Pico. The case was also notable for the court's decision to apply the rationale in Pico despite the fact that it was not a majority decision. In 2025, the en banc Fifth Circuit overruled the decision in Little v. Llano County, saying that "Campbell was based on a mistaken reading of precedent and, since decided, has played no role insimilar controversies in our circuit."
