= American Booksellers Foundation for Free Expression v. Strickland =

Judgment on Constitutional issue

Am. Booksellers Found. for Free Expression v. Strickland
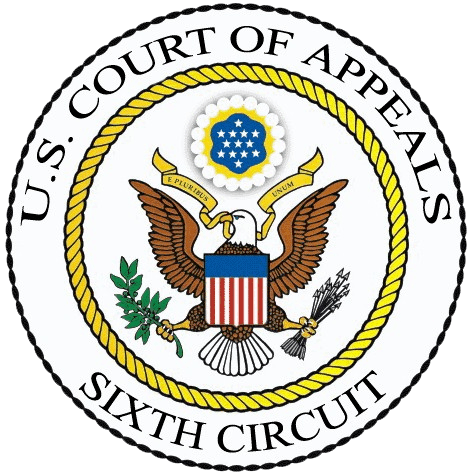
- Court: United States Court of Appeals for the Sixth Circuit
- Full case name: American Booksellers Foundation for Free Expression, et al. v. Ted Strickland, Richard Cordroy, et al.
- Decided: March 19, 2009
- Citation: 560 F.3d 443

Case history
- Prior history: 512 F. Supp. 2d 1082 (S.D. Ohio 2007)
- Subsequent history: 121 Ohio St. 3d 1496 (2009) (questions certified); 2010 Ohio 149 (January 27, 2010) (certified questions answered)

Court membership
- Judges sitting: Chief Judge Boyce F. Martin, Jr.; Judge Raymond M. Kethledge; Chief Judge James G. Carr (sitting by designation)

Case opinions
- Majority: Martin, joined by unanimous

Laws applied
- U.S. Const. Amend. I, Commerce Clause

American Booksellers Foundation for Free Expression v. Strickland, 560 F.3d 443 (6th Cir. 2009), is a decision of the Sixth Circuit Court of Appeals involving a constitutional challenge—both facially and as-applied to internet communications—to an Ohio statute prohibiting the dissemination or display to juveniles of certain sexually-explicit materials or performances. The Sixth Circuit panel declined to resolve the constitutional issue but, instead, certified two questions to the Ohio Supreme Court regarding the interpretation of the statute. The Ohio Supreme Court answered both questions affirmatively and placed a narrowing construction on the statute. Since the Ohio Supreme Court's decision, the Sixth Circuit has not reheard the case.

== Facts and procedural background ==
In 2002, plaintiffs American Booksellers Foundation for Free Expression, joined by various publishers, retailers, and web site operators, sued Ohio's Attorney General and Ohio county prosecutors in United States District Court for the Southern District of Ohio. Plaintiffs alleged that Ohio Revised Code §2907.01(E) and (J), which prohibited the dissemination or display of "materials harmful to juveniles", unconstitutionally violated both the First Amendment and the Commerce Clause of the Constitution. Plaintiffs specifically challenged the statute's definition of "harmful to juveniles", as well as the provisions governing internet dissemination of those materials.

The district court granted a preliminary injunction prohibiting enforcement of the statute as applied to internet communications because it was unconstitutionally overbroad and failed strict scrutiny, but rejected a challenge under the Commerce Clause. The court held the statute unconstitutional because the statute's definition of "material harmful to minors" did not comply with two United States Supreme Court decisions – Miller v. California and Ginsberg v. New York – which defined the constitutional standards for the regulation of obscenity and the regulation of material deemed "harmful to minors." Defendants appealed the decision to the Sixth Circuit.

Before the Sixth Circuit could hear the appeal, however, the Ohio General Assembly amended the challenged statute. The Sixth Circuit remanded the case to the district court to consider the constitutionality of the newly amended statute.

At the district court, plaintiffs challenged the provisions of §2907.31(E), which prohibited the distribution of certain sexually explicit materials that were "harmful to juveniles", and §2907.31(D), "internet provision" of the statute. Like their earlier challenge, plaintiffs alleged that the amended statutes violated both the First Amendment and the Commerce Clause, specifically with regard to the statute's definition of "material harmful to juveniles" and the breadth of the provisions related to internet dissemination. Both parties filed cross motions for summary judgment.

The district court concluded that the amended statute's definition of material "harmful to juveniles" was not unconstitutionally vague, and thus satisfied the Supreme Court's tests under Miller and Ginsberg. However, the district court concluded that the statute's treatment of "internet communications" was unconstitutionally overbroad in violation of the First Amendment. The court then partially granted and denied summary judgment to both parties. Both parties appealed the decision.

== Sixth Circuit decision ==
=== Issues presented ===
Defendants appealed the district court's determination that the section of the statute governing internet dissemination, § 2907.31(D), was unconstitutionally overbroad and violative of the First Amendment. Plaintiffs appealed the district court's determination that the section of the statute defining material "harmful to juveniles", §2907.01(E), was not void for vagueness, and the court's determination that § 2907.31(D) was not violative of the Commerce Clause.

The Sixth Circuit, however, declined to address either party's challenge. Instead, the court focused on the appropriate interpretation of § 2907.31(D). Section 2907.31(D) has two sections, both of which relate to the electronic dissemination of material harmful to juveniles. Section 2907.31(D)(1) provides that a person disseminates material harmful to juveniles through electronic communication when that person "knows or has reason to believe that the person receiving the information is a juvenile". Section 2907.31(D)(2) precludes from criminal liability those persons disseminating material harmful to juveniles if "[t]he person has inadequate information to know or have reason to believe that a particular recipient of the information or offer is a juvenile", or "[t]he method of mass distribution does not provide the person the ability to prevent a particular recipient from receiving the information".

Plaintiffs argued that Section 2907.31(D) was unconstitutionally overbroad and would significantly chill constitutionally protected, adult-to-adult speech. Despite the statute's requirement that the person "know[s] or has reason to believe" the person was disseminating material to a juvenile, due to the inherent difficulties in age verification on the internet, "any internet user is put on notice that the recipient may be a juvenile". Adults engaged in otherwise constitutionally protected speech could therefore become criminally liable under the statute, simply because the material posted was viewed by a minor. Plaintiffs argued that criminal liability could extend to websites in certain circumstances, and that the statute provided no guidance as to the circumstances when an individual would have "inadequate information" to suspect a juvenile was accessing prohibited material or when a person had "the ability to prevent" juveniles from accessing such information.

Defendants argued that § 2907.31(D) did not apply to "[w]eb communications, other than such personally directed devices as instant messaging or person-to-person email". Plaintiffs contended that §2907.31(D) exempts a narrower range of internet communication than Defendants admitted and therefore regulates webpage communication in certain circumstances. The Attorney General's construction of the statute to apply only to "instant messaging or person-to-person email" was a departure from the defendant's construction of the statute in the district court, and not obvious interpretation in light of the text of the statute. However, because "the Attorney General does not bind the state courts or local law enforcement authorities", the Sixth Circuit was unable to "accept [his] interpretation of the law as authoritative".

Furthermore, Plaintiffs also raised a dormant commerce clause challenge to the statute. The court looked to American Library Association v. Pataki (S.D. N.Y. 1997), which struck down a similar statute on dormant commerce clause grounds in order to conclude that there was no violation, as follows:

In light of recent decisions, upholding state statutes prohibiting spam and other fraud perpetrated via electronic mail, and the absence of authority to demonstrate preemption of internet regulation by the Federal government, this Court cannot adopt Pataki's reasoning that the transient nature of the internet renders all state regulation of the internet a violation of the commerce clause.

=== Certification of state law questions ===
"Rather than speculate" on the proper scope and interpretation of § 2907.31(D), the Sixth Circuit determined, sua sponte, that "the better course ... [was] to provide the Supreme Court of Ohio with the opportunity to interpret the scope of § 2907.31(D)(2)'s exemptions and the statute's coverage". Because the statute had not been authoritatively interpreted by Ohio's highest court and because the narrowing construction of the statute proposed on appeal by the Attorney General was not binding on state officials, the Sixth Circuit certified two questions to the Ohio Supreme Court in order to assist the court's later resolution of the constitutional issues. Those questions were:

(1) Is the Attorney General correct in construing O.R.C. § 2907.31(D) to limit the scope of § 2907.31(A), as applied to electronic communications, to personally directed devices such as instant messaging, person-to-person e-mails, and private chat rooms?
(2) Is the Attorney General correct in construing O.R.C. § 2907.31(D) to exempt from liability material posted on generally accessible websites and in public chat rooms?

The court upheld the district court's injunction on enforcement of § 2907.31 pending further resolution by the court.

== Subsequent history ==
The Ohio Supreme Court accepted the Sixth Circuit's questions for certification on June 3, 2009. The Court heard oral arguments on October 20, 2009.

On January 27, 2010, the Court issued its decision, answering both the Sixth Circuit's questions affirmatively, and adopting the statutory construction advocated by the Attorney General. Answering the Sixth Circuit's first question, the Court held that "the scope of R.C. 2907.31(D) is limited to electronic communications that can be personally directed, because otherwise the sender of matter harmful to juveniles cannot know or have reason to believe that a particular recipient is a juvenile." With regard to the second question, the Court concluded that "a person who posts matter harmful to juveniles on generally accessible websites and in public chat rooms does not violate R.C. 2907.31(D), because such a posting does not enable that person to 'prevent a particular recipient from receiving the information.'"
