= Recompense (film) =

1925 film

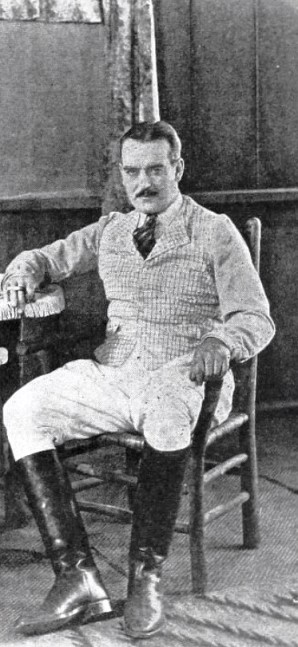
- Still with William B. Davidson
- Directed by: Harry Beaumont
- Screenplay by: Dorothy Farnum
- Based on: Recompense by Robert Keable
- Starring: Marie Prevost; Monte Blue; John Roche; George Siegmann; Charles Stevens; Virginia Brown Faire
- Cinematography: David Abel
- Production company: Warner Bros.
- Distributed by: Warner Bros.
- Release date: April 26, 1925
- Running time: 70 minutes
- Country: United States
- Language: Silent (English intertitles)
- Budget: $128,000
- Box office: $263,000

Recompense is a 1925 American silent drama film directed by Harry Beaumont and written by Dorothy Farnum. It is based on the 1924 novel Recompense by Robert Keable. The film stars Marie Prevost, Monte Blue, John Roche, George Siegmann, Charles Stevens, and Virginia Brown Faire. The film was released by Warner Bros. on April 26, 1925.

== Plot ==
As described in a film magazine review, clergyman Peter leaves the pulpit to enter World War I to be near Julie, the woman he loves. They are separated, but after the war she nurses him through a long illness. He will not marry her because it would hinder the humanitarian work that he plans. She keeps her faith in him, which prompts him to return to her and marry her.

== Cast ==
- Marie Prevost as Julie Gmelyn
- Monte Blue as Peter Graham
- John Roche as Dr. Sampson
- George Siegmann as Stenhouse
- Charles Stevens as Mosheshoe
- Virginia Brown Faire as Angelica
- William B. Davidson as Col. Donovan
- Katherine Lewis as Mrs. Donovan
- Etta Lee as Dancing Girl

== Box office ==
According to Warner Bros., the film earned $226,000 domestically and $37,000 in foreign markets.

== Preservation ==
With no prints of Recompense located in any film archive, it is a lost film.
