= Community Resources for Justice =

American nonprofit organization

- Formation: 1878; 148 years ago
- Website: https://www.crj.org/

Community Resources for Justice is a Massachusetts-based organization that has worked for over 130 years in social justice in issues like ex-offender re-entry, prison conditions, public safety, and crime prevention. CRJ was formed through the merger of several older organizations in the Boston and New England area, and while most of its work today is focused in the northeastern United States, CRJ is also engaged in work in other states around the nation.

== History ==
Community Resources for Justice (CRJ) represents the long evolution of criminal justice organizations in Massachusetts. The oldest organization in CRJ's history, the New England Society for the Suppression of Vice (NESSV), began in 1878 and worked to create legislation that influence public morality and dissuade crime. The NESSV went through a number of name changes as it took on more goals: in 1891 it was renamed the New England Watch and Ward Society following its new focus on organized crime in the Boston area. In 1957, that became the New England Citizens Crime Commission, focusing further on specific organized crimes groups. In 1967 the NECCC turned back to crime prevention under the name Massachusetts Council on Crime and Correction.

Shortly after the NESSV began, a parallel organization, the Massachusetts Prison Association, was founded in 1889. It focused on providing temporary amenities for recently released criminals. In 1937, it broadened scope to provide emergency services to the previously incarcerated. The Massachusetts Prison Association continued to merge with other corrections societies such as the John Howard Society and the Friends of Prisoners in 1940.

Following a loss of funding in 1975, these two larger organizations, the Massachusetts Council on Crime and Correction and the Massachusetts Correctional Association, merged to become the Crime and Justice Foundation. The group’s current name, Community Resources for Justice (CRJ), was created in 1999 after merging with MHHI.

Today, the organization provides services to ex–offenders to re-integrate them into society, and reforming the criminal justice system through public policy development while simultaneously pushing for legislation aiding adults with intellectual disabilities and troubled youth.

== Activities ==
Community Resources for Justice provides services to ex–offenders to re–integrate them into society while also working to reform the criminal justice system through public policy development. CRJ also provides services to adults with intellectual disabilities. CRJ operates group homes, halfway houses, and youth residential facilities in three states.

CRJ's policy work is partially accomplished through its research arm, The Crime and Justice Institute. The Institute collaborates with both regional and national organizations to conduct research and write policy briefs to further inform both scholarly research and public policy.

== Recent work ==
In 2001, CRJ released a study that showed that corrections overhauls from the late 1980s stripped the focus on rehabilitation from prison life, leaving prisoners unfit to be released. The study states that 62 percent of former state prison inmates will be rearrested within three years of release. Reporting on the study highlighted the increasing likelihood of recidivism, due to the decline in reintegration programs, and discussed law enforcement's challenge in not just putting criminals in prison, but finding methods to help them stop reoffending.

CRJ, along with The Boston Foundation, conducted research with employers, advocates, criminal records officials, landlords, and legislators to give "a first look at the real-world effects of changes to the Criminal Offender Record Information system, widely known by the acronym CORI, which had been lauded by activists as a game-changer for people with criminal records looking to reintegrate into society." CRJ's work helped put the “Ban the Box” provision into place, which prevents employers from asking about criminal records on initial job applications, but their subsequent study showed that while this has allowed more former convicts to get job interviews, it has seldom translated into jobs.
