= American Booksellers Association =

Trade association for independent bookstores

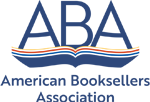
- Abbreviation: ABA
- Founded: 1900; 126 years ago
- Type: nonprofit trade association
- Tax ID no.: 13-5676641
- Legal status: 501(c)(6)
- Purpose: To help independently owned bookstores grow and succeed.
- CEO: Allison K. Hill
- President: Cynthia Compton
- Subsidiaries: Booksellers Order Service Inc
- Revenue: $5,299,148 (2021)
- Expenses: $4,498,252 (2021)
- Employees: 42 (2021)
- Volunteers: 12 (2021)
- Website: www.bookweb.org

The American Booksellers Association (ABA) is a non-profit trade association founded in 1900 that promotes independent bookstores in the United States. ABA's core members are key participants in their communities' local economy and culture, and to assist them ABA creates relevant programs; provides education, information, business products, and services; and engages in public policy and industry advocacy. The Association actively supports and defends free speech and the First Amendment rights of all Americans, without contradiction of equity and inclusion, through the American Booksellers for Free Expression. A volunteer board of 13 booksellers governs the Association. Previously headquartered in White Plains, New York, ABA became a fully remote organization in 2024.

In 1947, ABA launched the American Booksellers Association Convention and Trade Show, later known as BookExpo America (though ABA had held conventions as early as 1901).

== Winter Institute and Children's Institute ==
The American Booksellers Association hosts two conferences each year, known as Institutes. Institutes typically last several days and consist of tours of several independent bookstores in the host city, education sessions, author signings, and networking opportunities.

Winter Institute lasts four days and is typically held in late January of early February. It is the larger of the two events, with more than 1,000 people in attendance in 2024.

Children's Institute is a three-day long event, typically held in the summer, with education and sessions geared towards booksellers who carry children's books.

== Independent Bookstore Day ==
Independent Bookstore Day, celebrated the last Saturday in April, is a celebration of independent bookstores. The American Booksellers Association organizes this annual celebration, creates assets and resources for booksellers to use, and coordinates with publishers to create exclusive items booksellers can sell for this event.

Independent Bookstore Day was introduced in 2015, following the success of a regional California Bookstore Day. Though it started as a collaboration of the regional associations, Independent Bookstore Day was eventually handed over to ABA to organize.

== Membership ==
The ABA's membership has varied over time:

- 1991 — 5,200 members
- 1995 — 5,500 members with 7000 stores
- 1998 — 3,300 members
- 2000 — 3,100 members with 4000 stores
- 2001 — 2,794 members
- 2002 — 2,191 members
- 2005 — 1,702 members, "more than 90" member bookstores opened
- 2006 — 97 member bookstores opened
- 2007 — 115 member bookstores opened
- 2008 — ABA published no data
- 2009 — 1,401 members with 1,651 stores, 40 member bookstores opened, 26 of which were listed by Google Maps as "permanently closed" in December 2018.
- 2010 — 1,410 members, first increase in almost two decades. 26 member bookstores opened, 14 of which were listed as "permanently closed" on Google Maps as of December 2018.
- 2011 — 1,512 members with stores in 1823 locations, 41 member bookstores opened, Used bookstores are now eligible for membership, annual dues of smaller stores are lowered.
- 2012 — 1,567 members with stores in 1,900 locations, 43 member bookstores opened, 17 of which were listed as "permanently closed" on Google Maps in December 2018.
- 2013 — 1,632 members with stores in 1,971 locations, 45 member bookstores opened, 16 of which were listed as "permanently closed" on Google Maps in December 2018.
- 2014 — 1,664 members with stores in 2,094 locations, 59 member bookstores opened, 15 of which were no longer members and listed as "permanently closed" on Google Maps in December 2018.
- 2015 — 1,712 members with stores in 2,227 locations, 61 member bookstores opened, 14 of which were listed as "permanently closed" on Google Maps in December 2018, 3 others are marked "online only" in ABA's list.
- 2016 — 87 member bookstores opened
- 2017 — 75 member bookstores opened
- 2018 — 1,835 members with stores in 2,470 locations, 99 member bookstores opened
- 2019 — 1,887 members with stores in 2,524 locations, 111 member bookstores opened
- 2020 — no numbers published
- 2021 — 1,700 members with stores in 2,100 locations
- 2022 — 2,178 members with stores in 2,593 locations

The ABA sponsored the Book Sense marketing program and associated BookSense.com web site, intended to preserve a connection between consumers and local independent bookstores. In June 2008, Book Sense was replaced by IndieBound, a new program and website.

== Association of Booksellers for Children ==
In November, 2010, the Association of Booksellers for Children (ABC), a non-profit trade association supporting the business of independent children's bookselling, agreed to merge with the American Booksellers Association. The former ABC is now a membership group within the ABA.

== IndieBound ==
IndieBound is a marketing movement for independent bookstores launched in 2008 by the American Booksellers Association. With resources designed to encourage readers to shop at independent bookstores, it promotes fiscal localism.

IndieBound is home to the Indie Bookstore Finder, an interactive map that allows visitors to find independent bookstores across the country. IndieBound also hosts curated reading lists like the Indie Next List and Kids' Indie Next Lists as well as Indie Bestseller Lists.

=== Launch ===
IndieBound was launched in June 2008 to replace a prior marketing program for independents called Book Sense. IndieBound does not sell books directly, instead it directs customers to nearby independent bookstores who sell online through their own e-commerce sites.

=== Indie Bestseller Lists ===
The Indie Bestseller Lists show the top selling titles in independent bookstores nationwide.

Indie Bestseller Lists are published weekly for hardcover fiction, hardcover nonfiction, trade paperback fiction, trade paperback nonfiction, mass market paperback, "children's interest," children's illustrated, and children's fiction series. Category lists, which focus on a particular genre, are published less frequently. The Indie Bestseller Lists are released by IndieBound as XML feeds.

=== Indie Next Lists ===
The Indie Next List (published monthly) and the Kids' Indie Next List (published every other month) feature new releases nominated by booksellers across the country.

The ABA collects these bookseller nominations and compiles the Indie Next Lists.

=== Indies Choice Book Awards ===
The annual Indies Choice Book Awards gives owners and employees of ABA stores the opportunity to vote for their favorite titles of the year. The award started in 1991 and has gone by several names (the American Bookseller Book of the Year Award, the Book Sense Book of the year, and the Indies Choice Book Awards/E.B. White Read-Aloud Awards). During previous iterations of the award, the winning authors were honored at a banquet at BookExpo America. BookExpo was "retired" in 2020, in part due to the pandemic, and the Indies Choice Book Awards were paused.

In January 2026, the ABA announced the return of the Indies Choice Book Awards. The updated annual awards feature seven categories (Adult Fiction, Adult Nonfiction, Children's Picture Books, Middle Grade, Young Adult, Debut Adult, and Debut Children's) and any title that has appeared on ABA's Indie Next List, Kids' Indie Next List, or Indies Introduce list for that year are eligible for the award. Titles are voted on by ABA member booksellers and bookstore owners.

== See also ==
- List of independent bookstores
- Murder at the ABA, a novel by Isaac Asimov
- List of booksellers associations
- Books in the United States
