= Something Happened in Our Town =

2018 children's book by Marianne Celano, Marietta Collins, and Ann Hazzard

- Author: Marianne Celano, Marietta Collins, and Ann Hazzard
- Illustrator: Jennifer Zivoin
- Language: English
- Genre: Children's book
- Publisher: Magination Press
- Publication date: March 1, 2018
- Publication place: United States
- ISBN: 978-1-433-82854-6

Something Happened in Our Town: A Child's Story about Racial Injustice is a children's book by Marianne Celano, Marietta Collins and Ann Hazzard; illustrated by Jennifer Zivoin; and published March 1, 2018 by Magination Press. The book follows two families as they discuss a racialized police shooting in their community.

The book was the sixth-most banned and challenged book in the United States in 2018.

== Reception ==
Something Happened in Our Town was a New York Times and IndieBound bestseller. The book also won the National Parenting Product Award in 2018, and was a Little Free Library Action Book Club Selection.

Despite the above, in 2020, the book was named the sixth most banned and challenged book in the United States by the American Library Association. The book was one of many racialized books banned and challenged that year, following the protests related to the murder of George Floyd.

=== Controversy ===
In 2021, MacArthur Elementary School in Binghamton, New York named Something Happened in Our Town Book of the Month and included a reading of the book on the school's website. The school's selection sparked controversy with the Binghamton Police Benevolent Association, which said the book portrays a "blatant anti-police message," stating that "the language in this book works to undermine public safety and will leave children with the impression that they cannot trust the police." The school board held a meeting where they listened to members of the community discuss the book for over two hours.

Parents, along with the school board, ultimately decided the book resulted in meaningful conversations among students, parents, and faculty members.
