= Simon Called Peter =

1921 novel by Robert Keable

Simon Called Peter is a novel by Robert Keable (1887–1927) that was a best-seller in 1921. The title is a reference to Simon Peter the apostle and first Pope of the Catholic Church.

In 1921, it was met with astonishing success, and its runaway popularity won Keable a level of celebrity. The novel reportedly sold more than 600,000 copies during the 1920s, reaching a 66th edition by 1922. A largely autobiographical work, Simon Called Peter is the tale of a priest, Peter Graham, who has an affair in wartime France with a nurse named Julie. The title character almost abandons his faith for love, but experiences a direct revelation of Christ while watching a Catholic mass and is given up by his lover, who sees his sincerity. The novel was controversial at its introduction due to its sexual and religious content.

It was made into a play in 1924 by Jules Eckert Goodman and Edward Knoblock; which had a short run on Broadway.

The novel is referred to in F. Scott Fitzgerald's The Great Gatsby. Nick Carraway, the narrator, reads a chapter after becoming inebriated and claims that "either it was terrible stuff or the whisky distorted things, because it didn't make any sense to me."

The novel was followed by a sequel, Recompense, published in 1924, which was made into a 1925 motion picture with the same title. There are no surviving copies of the film, making it a lost film.
