= Robert Keable =

British novelist

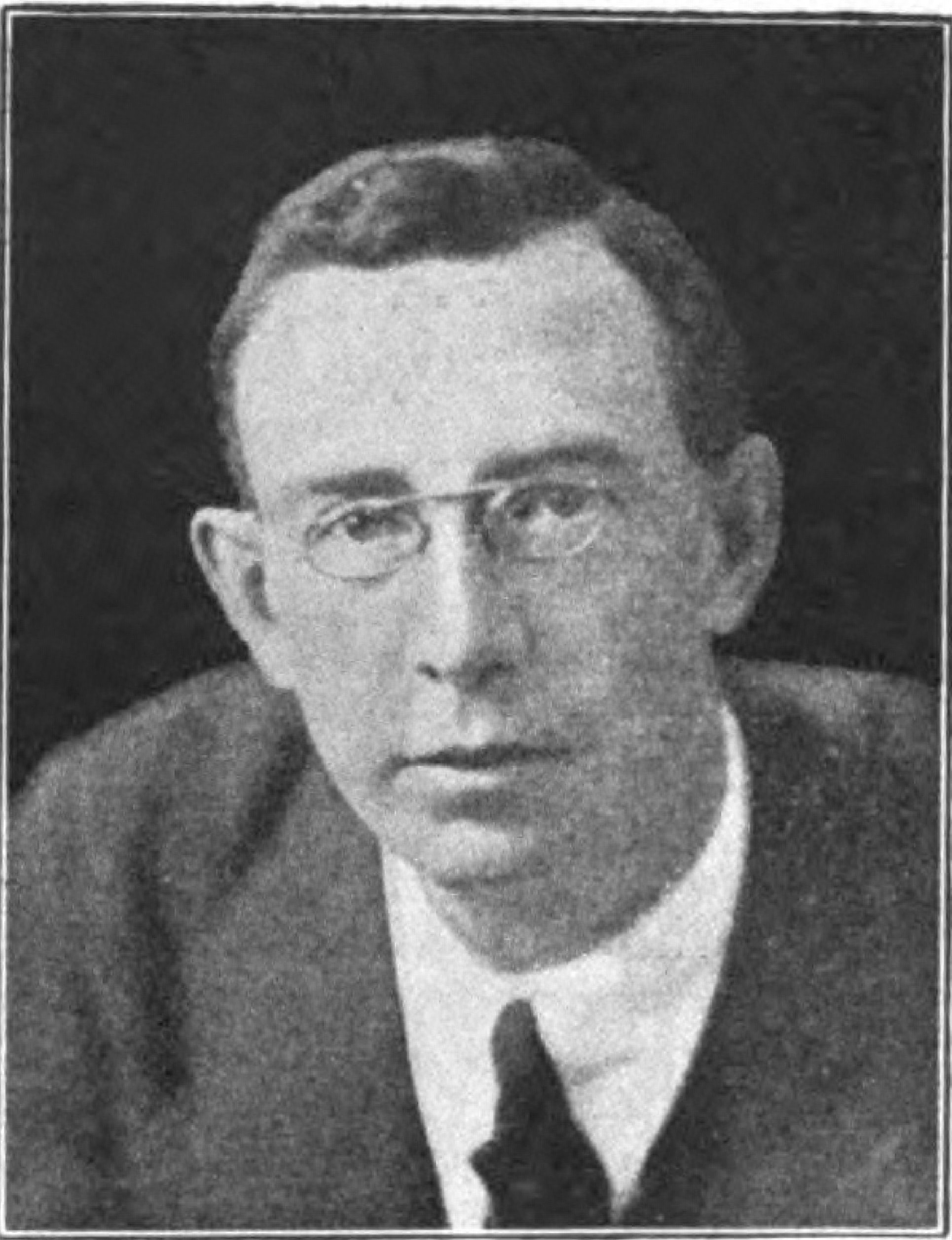
- Born: 6 March 1887; Bedfordshire
- Died: 22 December 1927 (aged 40); Tahiti
- Education: MA (Cantab); BA (Hons) in the history tripos
- Alma mater: Magdalene College, Cambridge
- Occupations: Missionary and Church of England priest
- Spouse(s): Sybil Keable (née Armitage); Grace Eileen Joly Beresford Buck; Ina
- Children: Anthony Robert Keable (b. 1924); Henry Reheatoa (b. 1927)
- Writing career
- Period: 1914–1927
- Genres: Romance, war
- Subject: Theology
- Notable works: Simon Called Peter (1921); Recompense; Peradventure; The Mother of All Living

Robert Keable (6 March 1887 – 22 December 1927) was a British novelist, formerly a missionary and priest in the Church of England. He resigned his ministry following his experiences in the First World War and caused a scandal with his 1921 novel Simon Called Peter, the tale of a priest's wartime affair with a young nurse. The book sold 600,000 copies in the 1920s alone, was referenced in The Great Gatsby, and was cited in a double murder investigation. Fêted in the United States, but critically less than well-received, Keable moved to Tahiti where he continued to write, producing both novels and theological works, until his death at age 40 of kidney disease.

Keable was raised in Bedfordshire and educated at Magdalene College, Cambridge. He entered a theological college after graduation and was ordained a priest in 1911. He spent the next several years as a missionary in Africa, stationed on Zanzibar and in Basutoland, before returning to Europe as an army chaplain during the First World War. There, he met and began a relationship with a young nurse, Grace Eileen Joly Beresford Buck, a development over which he eventually quit the Church of England and left his wife, Sybil. Returning to England after the war, Keable resigned his ministry and began to write novels: his first, 1921's Simon Called Peter, became a runaway success and launched Keable into a life of literary celebrity. Increasingly disillusioned with the hypocrisies he saw in contemporary British life, he and Buck left Europe for Tahiti in 1922. The couple lived there happily until Buck's death in childbirth in 1924, after which Keable's health began to fade. He nonetheless began a later relationship with a Tahitian woman, Ina, with whom he had a son, and continued to publish novels until his death of a kidney condition in 1927.

Keable's most famous publication was his first novel, Simon Called Peter, but he produced a prodigious literary output, spanning theological tracts through poetry to travel guides. Simon Called Peter's sequel, Recompense, was made into a film, and his later novels all attracted substantial attention. His writings generally met with much greater popular than critical approbation, and Simon Called Peter was sufficiently incendiary to be banned. The book nonetheless became a contemporary best-seller.

Much of Keable's fiction contained autobiographical elements, often centring on his attitudes toward and experience of the Christian religious establishment. As well as these fictional explorations he produced a final, non-fiction work, The Great Galilean, outlining the religious views he developed during a lifetime's uneasy relationship to Anglicanism and Catholicism. He came to believe that the historical Jesus bore little relationship to the Jesus of Christian tradition, and, in The Great Galilean, attempted to reconcile his ambivalence about the orthodoxies of the Church with his enduring belief in an all-loving God. Keable's views earned him many unfavourable reviews and the contempt of the church in which he had practised, but foreshadowed ideas of free love that became prominent later in the 20th century.

== Early life ==
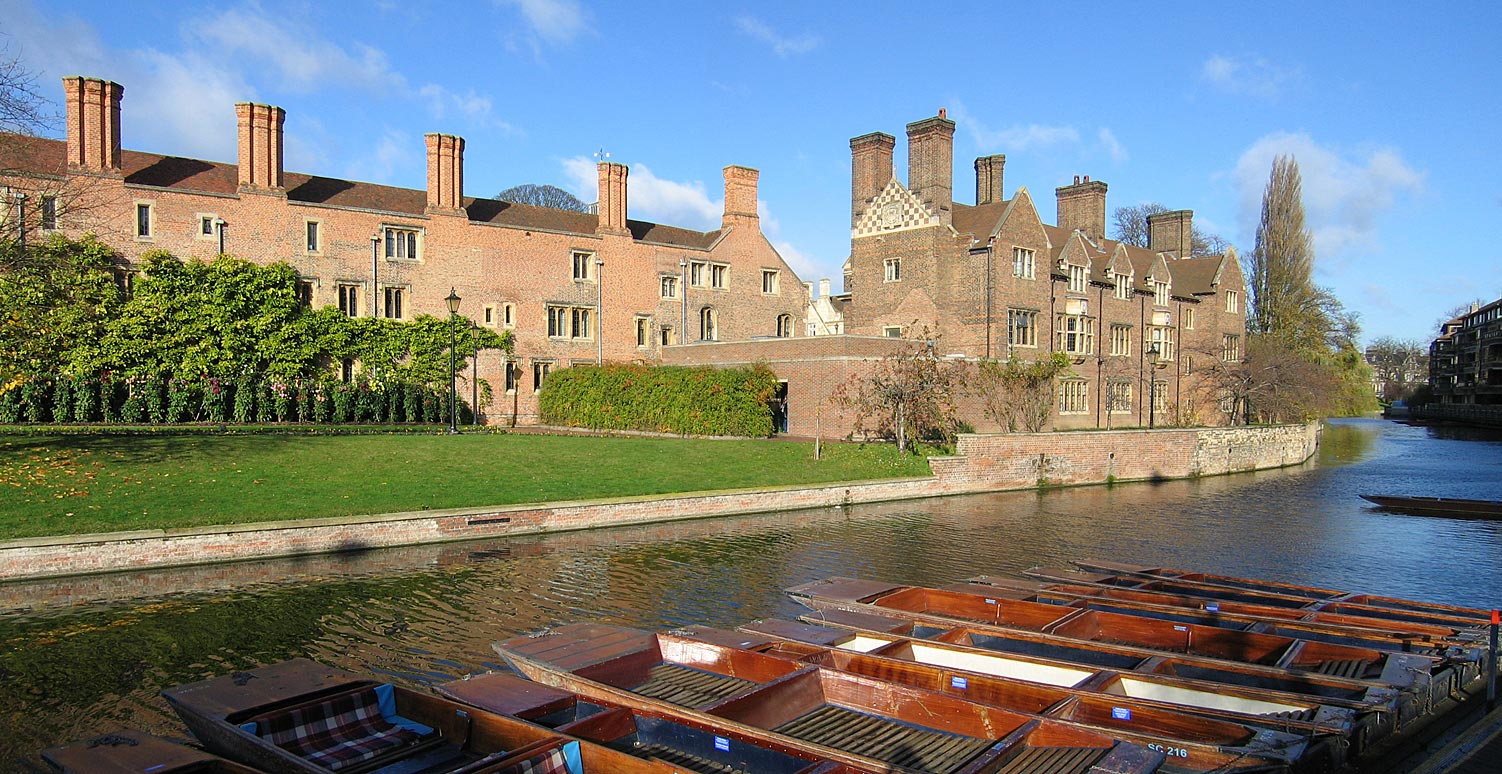
Magdalene College, Cambridge, Keable's alma mater

Keable was named after his father, Robert Henry Keable, a successful businessman who in 1904, when his son was 17, was ordained an Anglican priest and became vicar at Pavenham, Bedfordshire. Robert Keable had a younger brother, Henry, who died of typhoid c.1918. The young Keable attended Whitgift School in Croydon, Surrey, where he was nicknamed "Kibbles" and noted for his "fluent and facetious" contributions to the school paper, the Whitgiftian. Influenced by his father's piety he became an active lay preacher and member of the YMCA as a teenager. Keable's was an austere, Anglican upbringing, the effect of which, his biographer Hugh Cecil has suggested, was to leave the young man industrious, somewhat preacherly in his writing style, and with a devoutness not particularly tied to the specific faith in which he'd been raised.

Keable went up to Magdalene College, Cambridge, in 1905. His peers there included the future Everest explorer George Mallory and Arthur Tedder, 1st Baron Tedder. Though his contemporaries described him as a quiet, devout student who initially associated only with other "religious-minded" men, he later became more sociable and rowed in the college second eight. He took a first in the History Tripos, graduating with his BA in 1908 and receiving his MA in 1914. At Magdalene he was a great friend of Arthur Grimble, the future commissioner of the Gilbert and Ellice Islands (Kiribati). Grimble's daughter, in a biography of her father, described the undergraduate Keable as devout, "earnest, somewhat introspective" and deeply literary. She records that he spent his university vacations on missionary work. He is known also to have taught in East Africa under YMCA auspices, and to have climbed Mount Kilimanjaro.

Among the most significant acquaintances Keable made at Cambridge were two brothers among the fellowship, Arthur and Hugh Benson. The Bensons were sons of a highly accomplished academic and religious family; their father, Edward White Benson, was Archbishop of Canterbury and their mother, Mary Sidgwick Benson, the sister of the philosopher Henry Sidgwick, had set up a lesbian household with Lucy Tait (daughter of the previous archbishop of Canterbury) after her husband's death. In the years just before Keable came to Cambridge Hugh Benson (the inspiration for Keable's character "Father Vassall" in Peradventure (1921)) had departed from the Anglicanism of his upbringing in favour of the Roman Catholic Church, being ordained a Catholic priest in 1904. According to Keable's contemporaries, the two met when Edouardo Ginistrelli, a neighbour on Keable's staircase, invited them both to lunch: "Keable ... fell under the spell of Fr Benson's winning personality," wrote James I. James, a college acquaintance of Keable's: "Keable's Anglican loyalty remained, but it was a new kind of loyalty. He spoke no more of Protestantism but always of Catholicism... in Chapel he now genuflected and crossed himself. A strange mystic element deep down in his being began to stir... I often suspected that Fr Benson had posed to this clever mind – for Keable was clever – the arguments that had recently brought himself to Catholicism." Benson was also a novelist and, under his influence, the sensory, aesthetic dimension of Keable's own writing (and of his faith) began to develop. Benson sensed in Keable an "inclination to Rome", but Keable elected for the Anglican priesthood, joining the theological college of Westcott House and serving as canon at Bradford after completing his studies.

== Priesthood ==
In 1911 Keable was ordained a priest of the Church of England at Ripon. His friend Hugh Benson regretted that Keable had not turned to Catholicism, a decision Benson felt would lead Keable to ultimate disenchantment with the Church. In a letter he told Keable:

You are the first I ever met of whom I could say 'I know that he knows Christ, and that he is turning his back on him; and I know he knows it too.'

— Robert Hugh Benson, Martindale, Cyril Charles (1916). The Life of Robert Hugh Benson. Vol. 2. London: Longmans. pp. 265–274. Quoted in Cecil (1995) p.160.

=== African missions ===
From 1912 to 1914 Keable was sent overseas with the Universities' Mission to Central Africa, a decision perhaps intended to "save him from Rome". He served under Frank Weston, the Bishop of Zanzibar, a staunch Anglican with whom Keable clashed: Keable objected to Weston's unorthodox methods for training black African priests; Weston, a vehement supporter of these priests, saw prejudice in Keable's views. Weston was to inspire the "Bishop of Moçambique" character in Keable's 1921 novel Peradventure. In Africa, Keable wrote his first two books: 1912's Darkness or Light, a history of the Universities' Mission to Central Africa, and the manuscript for City of the Dawn (published in 1915), a portrait of Zanzibar that "showed genuine religious fervour, as well as a characteristic sentimentality".

Keable returned to the UK in 1914 as a result of illness, precipitated perhaps by the rigour of service upon which Weston insisted in Zanzibar. He was offered a church posting in Sheffield but declined, fearing "the pull of Rome" if left within reach of Catholic influences in Britain. Instead, he made two attempts to enlist for armed service during the First World War; ill health thwarted both, so he returned to Africa for mission work, becoming rector of three parishes (including Leribe, Basutoland), under the diocese of the Bishop of Bloemfontein. He published some ten devotional works and works on missionary practice during this time, including The Loneliness of Christ, and a book of verse titled Songs of the narrow way. The damaging effects of the illness he had suffered were compounded by an assault while in the field: accounts vary, with some friends recalling that Keable received a blow to the head from a "powerful native", and others describing a gunshot wound to the thigh, inflicted by a local Mosutu man. Keable's biographer Cecil has suggested that the whole incident may have been a fabrication of Keable's.

In 1915 Keable married Sybil Armitage at Durban. The pair had met in Bradford; Sybil was "passionately religious, with a strong social conscience and robust health... a big, handsome (some thought beautiful) woman with auburn hair." She was well suited to the demands of life as a missionary's wife, and inspired the character Edith in Keable's later novel Peradventure, but the pair were temperamentally ill-matched (and described by Keable's biographer Cecil as "sexually incompatible"). They had no children; Hugh Benson suspected that the marriage had been a gesture on Keable's part to render impossible the lingering prospect that he might become a monk.

=== First World War ===
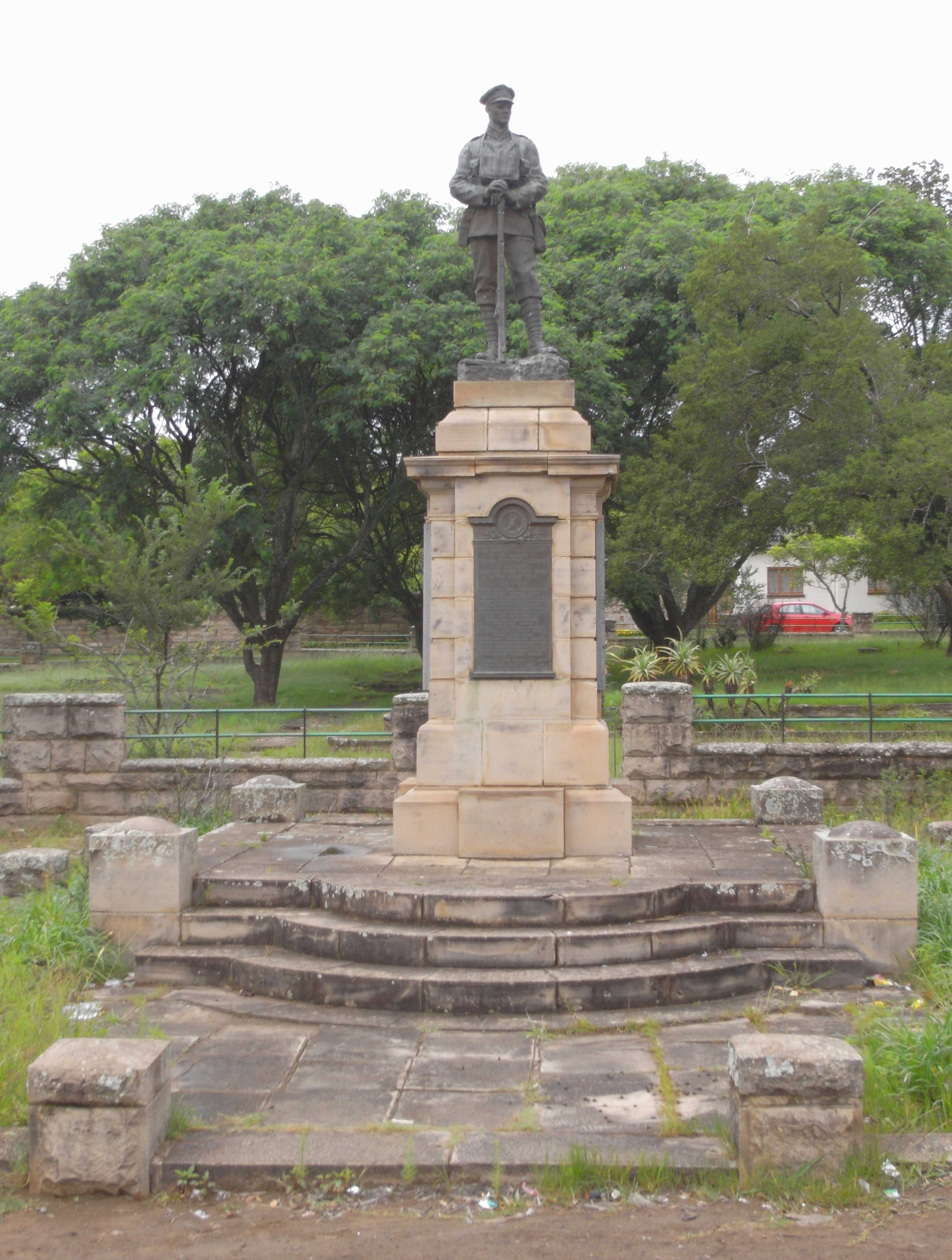
A memorial to South African soldiers who fought in the First World War, like the company for which Keable was chaplain

Keable eventually achieved his wish of going to war in 1917, when a South African contingent was mustered for military service in France and Keable volunteered to go with them as chaplain. His experiences there were to form the basis for his first and most successful novel, Simon Called Peter. Appointed an army chaplain on 26 May 1917, Keable travelled to the Rouen sector with a Native Labour Contingent of 21,000 men. These men were paid £3 per month to unload supply ships and provide infrastructure support for military operations in Europe. As a chaplain, with the rank of captain, Keable was expected to be at the disposal of the army at large, and ministered to those seeing active infantry service as well as to labourers. Padres were formally required to remain behind the lines, but it is apparent that Keable nonetheless saw something of the realities of the frontline.

Like many padres during the First World War, Keable reassessed his approach to his congregation. The men to whom he ministered, he came to believe, cared nothing for the finer points of Anglican theological dispute: from the church they wanted only "entertainment and a barely spiritual form of practical Christianity." Keable argued as much openly, suggesting that the Protestant chaplaincy in France should be amalgamated into the operations of the YMCA, and that only the Roman Catholic padres – who seemed to have quite a different, more immediate relationship with their Celtic and Lancastrian companies – should remain. His public airing of these views attracted censure from the church (and particularly from Frank Weston, who was also serving), but reflected the openness that made him popular with the officers in France. A smoker, he was known to share whisky and sodas in the officers' mess, and – as does the title character in Simon Called Peter – to have become acquainted with a devoutly religious French prostitute.

Another transformative war experience of Keable's was his acquaintance with Grace Eileen Joly Beresford Buck, known as "Jolie", an 18-year-old nurse from a prominent British family (the daughter of William Tenant Buck and Beatrice Elinor Biddulph Beresford; her ancestors included the Dukes of Rutland) who was driving trucks for the Canadian Lumber Corps when the two met. The pair began a lifelong affair, though Keable did not yet leave his wife. Instead, at the war's close, he returned to Leribe. He remained until 1919, torn by his increasing alienation from the church and his experiences during the war. There he wrote his first novel, Simon Called Peter, in an intense 20-day spell: "I laid a parson's life bare", he said of his writing, "and didn't care a damn". At last, in 1919, Keable resigned his ministry and left the Anglican church.

== Literary career ==
After leaving the church Keable and Sybil moved back to England, settling at West Wratting, Cambridgeshire, where both began to explore the Roman Catholic Church. Sybil converted and became a devout Catholic, but Keable also read works in contemporary philosophy and the books of Charles Darwin, and appears briefly to have lost his faith altogether. He wrote, of the history of Christianity, "I can see creative evolution at work. What is behind it, I don't know. But I'm inclined to think that I do not believe it is anything which the old concept of God really covers."

To support the family Keable worked during 1921 as an assistant-master at Dulwich College, and served the following year at Dunstable Grammar School. He continued to write: the manuscript for Simon Called Peter had found a publisher, Michael Sadleir at Constable, who liked its prospects and commissioned from Keable a second novel. He commenced The Mother of All Living, "an intense love-drama set in South Africa", which reflected his new interest in African traditional religion and featured a Bergsonian concept of "life-force" as an alternative to theology.

Then Simon Called Peter was published in April 1921, and met with astonishing success. The book reportedly sold over 600,000 copies during the 1920s, reaching a 16th edition by October 1922. A largely autobiographical work, Simon Called Peter is the tale of a priest, Peter Graham, who has an affair in wartime France with a nurse named Julie. The title character almost abandons his faith for love, but experiences a direct revelation of Christ while watching a Catholic mass and is given up by his lover, who sees his sincerity. Its runaway popularity won Keable a level of celebrity: he spent a lot of time in London and resumed his relationship with Buck, who was now usually known as "Betty" (she, by her token, called Keable "Bill"). The two met often at Gwen Otter's salon at No. 1 Ralston Street, in Chelsea, near to where Keable had lodgings; they made many friends, though refrained from fully overt displays of couplehood out of deference to Buck's distressed parents and Keable's wife. At this time, Keable appears to have become, in some measure, a proponent of open relationships and free love. He concluded that Buck had a right to pursue relationships with other men, though there is no firm evidence that she did, and "that a warm and spontaneous sexual nature, far from being in conflict with Christian love, was in fact a manifestation of it."

Keable's developing attitudes and relationship with "Betty" disgusted his wife, Sybil, but as a devout Catholic she refused to divorce. This left Keable unable to marry Buck, and contributed to a growing sense on his part of alienation from English society. Eventually, in 1922, he legally separated from his wife. He took up the suggestion of former college friend Arthur Grimble, by then a colonial administrator in the Ellice Islands, that he visit the South Pacific, a fashionable destination for 1920s Europeans. To Keable the South Seas appeared to offer escape from the hypocrisies of British society, as well as furnishing a climate better suited to his never-hearty constitution. In 1922 Keable and Buck sailed aboard the Bendigo for the South Pacific via Australia, where Keable undertook a book tour, giving lectures in which he broadcast his new sexual ethics: that unmarried couples in love could have deeply moral relationships, while loveless spouses who stayed together for convention's sake were committing acts of deep immorality. His views scandalised the contemporary press, but Frank Weston noted in correspondence that Keable as a "shipwrecked priest" made quite a useful cautionary tale for novices.

== Tahiti ==
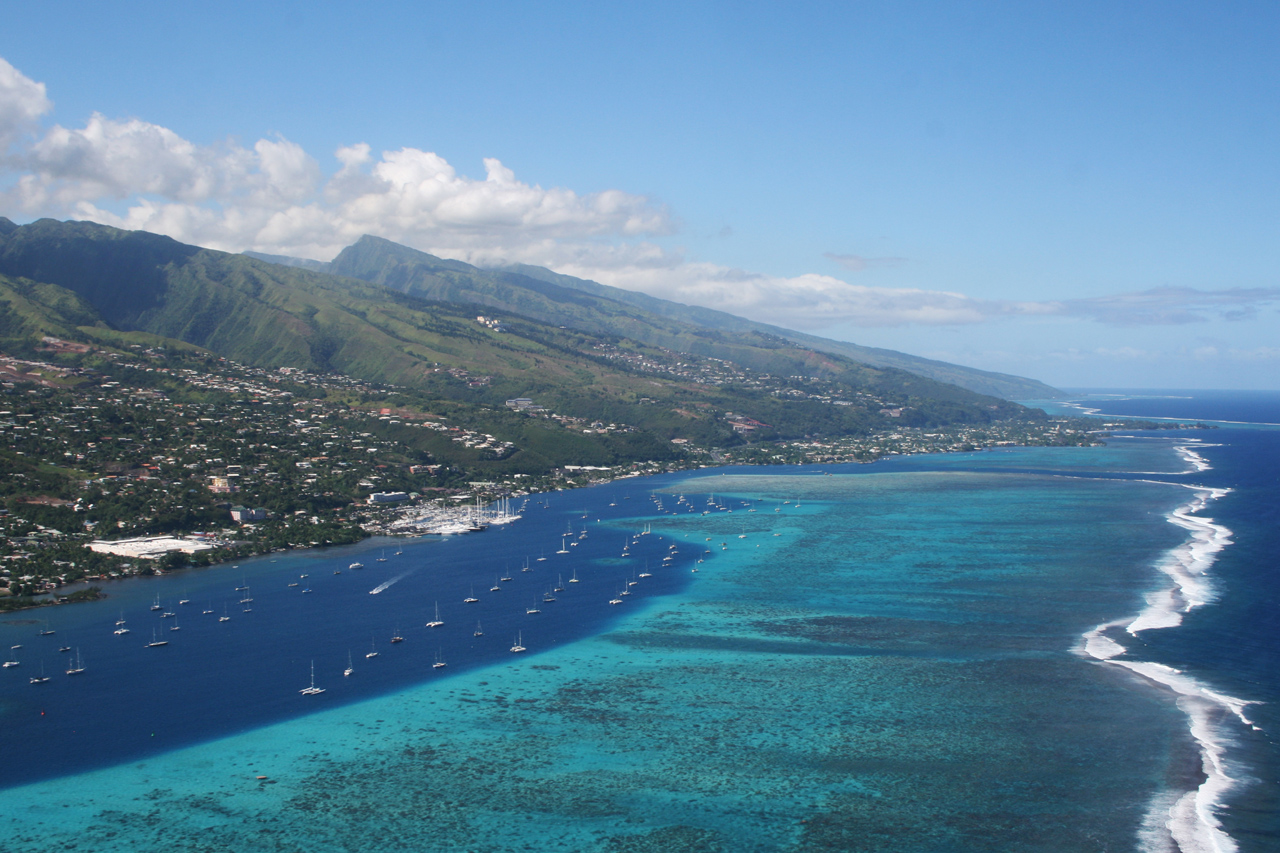
Papeete in Tahiti, Keable's adopted home

Keable was to remain resident in Tahiti for the rest of his life. He wrote once of his regret that the Tahitians had not succeeded in converting William Ellis, a nineteenth-century Christian missionary sent there to attempt to proselytise them. "Bill and Betty" settled at first in Paul Gauguin's former home at Punaavia. The house was quite luxurious, overlooking a bay with views of Moorea island. Buck drove a Dodge and enjoyed Tahiti's ample supplies of cheap French wine; Keable "brooded on Gauguin's gesture against spiritual suffocation", and eventually moved the household further inland, to a traditional Tahitian-style house in the wilder surrounds of Teahuahu, near Papeari. The couple made friends with the Swedish artist Paul Engdahl. Keable continued to write copiously, adding to his oeuvre the novel Recompense, a sequel to Simon Called Peter. He undertook several book tours of the United States and spent his spare time answering fanmail, swimming, and sailing.

Then, in 1924, Buck fell pregnant. The couple agreed that she should return to England for better healthcare during the birth, and she went there to set up a home with her mother's help. In early November 1924 she gave birth prematurely to a son, Anthony, and a few days later died of poisoning from chloroform administered against the pain of delivery. The grief-stricken Keable's own health worsened and he was advised to return to Tahiti; the baby, deemed too weak to travel, was left in England with Jack and Rita Elliott, friends of the couple's since the Ralston Street salon days. The Elliotts were eventually to adopt him.

Keable remained in Tahiti, his health worsening. He suffered weight loss, diabetes, high blood pressure and fever, all stemming from a kidney illness. Nonetheless, he completed the novel Numerous Treasure, which he had begun before Buck's death; the bittersweet tale of a Polynesian woman who shared her name with a cocktail and a brand of cigarettes was a commercial success, and has been considered a valuable portrait of early-century Tahitian life. His health and spirits rallied in the years after Buck's death: he completed a travel book, Tahiti, Isle of Dreams, and a book tour of the United States and Europe. On returning to Tahiti he struck up a relationship with a local woman of Tahitian and French descent named Ina, and made many new friends including the writers Alec Waugh (elder brother of Evelyn), who had been inspired to visit Tahiti by Numerous Treasure, Zane Grey, and James Norman Hall. Waugh described the Keable of this period "reclined among cushions, clad only in a pareo, while his Tahitian princess, bare-shouldered and bare-footed, her black hair falling to her waist and a white flower behind her ear, glided negligently about the house" – and yet noted that, on suggesting a cup of tea, Keable's voice still took on "the parsonical intonation with which fifteen years earlier he had summoned the parish children to a Sunday school treat".

1927's Lighten Our Darkness (or Ann Decides) was his last important novel. The tale of a Catholic priest restored to faith by a woman's love was, however, poorly received, and the follow-up Madness of Monty, a "kindly, innocuous comedy", went over worse still. Instead, helped by James Norman Hall to overcome his failing eyesight, Keable devoted his attention to The Great Galilean, a non-fictional account of the historical Jesus and his relationship to the Jesus of religious tradition.

Away from his writing, he and Ina conceived a child: Ina gave birth to a son, named Henry Reheatoa (meaning "glorious warrior"), with whom Keable was delighted and to whom he bequeathed all his Tahitian properties. In November 1927 he initiated formal divorce proceedings against Sybil in an attempt to legitimise this son.

In December 1927 Keable contracted a worsened kidney infection, became septic and delirious, and, on 22 December, died at home. The New York Times obituary identified the illness that killed him as Bright's disease; the term was used to refer to a number of nephritic kidney conditions.

Though, according to acquaintances, many of his friends had heard nothing from him since his departure for Tahiti, his will made provision for a scholarship at Magdalene and named the college as his residuary legatee. His literary assets at death were valued at £5,007. Though Keable received a Protestant burial in Papeete, some accounts suggest that in the last weeks of his life he formally converted to Catholicism. Other commentators suggest the pagan sentiments he expressed about the birth of his new son as a riposte to social convention tend to indicate otherwise. Hugh Cecil argues that, at his death, Keable most likely just became "able to reconcile his two ideals, romantic-erotic and religious, and could die peacefully accepting the rituals he loved."

== Religious views ==
The religious views Keable developed after leaving the Church of England influenced his novels; he eventually articulated his own theology in his final book, The Great Galilean, a theological work. The unorthodoxy of his views was not always well received. A reviewer of his novel Peradventure observed "Peradventure starts as a Church of England tract, becomes what would appear to be a Roman Catholic tract, and before the end is reached the reader is in doubt as to just what sort of tract it is."

His last book, The Great Galilean, has been characterised by one biographer as Keable's attempt "to renconcile his love of Jesus with his failure to believe in him as a God." The book sought to distinguish the "historical Jesus" of record from the "traditional Jesus" of church worship. The historical Jesus, Keable said, was so poorly known that there survived too little information for a three-line obituary. Instead, the figure that Christians worshipped was a "traditional Jesus", recorded in the Gospels from an oral tradition that was not really biographical. This "traditional Jesus" became a "literary Jesus", the central figure of the four gospels, and it is on this figure – quite distinct from the actual, historical Jesus – that the contemporary church centred. Keable sought to criticise the attitude in the contemporary church toward "traditional Jesus", given how much of the rest of "traditional" religion Protestantism had discarded. However, Keable was at pains to stress that the "traditional" Jesus should not be seen as an imposture, or something to be discarded. The ahistoricity of the traditional Jesus, he said, should not be a reason to leave the church. Without this traditional Jesus, he predicted, Western civilisation would fade and fall. He was, then, critical of the specific ways in which the contemporary church construed Jesus, in its attempts to conflate the traditional Jesus with historical Jesus, which Keable considered impossible. He blamed these actions of the church for the declining numbers of worshippers, and accused it of draining Christianity of profundity by relying too heavily on rationalism and rigid structure.

Though he believed that the historical Jesus was barely known, Keable nonetheless devoted much attention in The Great Galilean to trying to understand the figure. He emphasised the humanity of historical Jesus, who, he wrote, had shared humanity's ignorance – though had also been blessed with an extraordinarily undistorted mind. He wrote of a Jesus tolerant – even fond – of sinners, and one who, understanding the importance of love and sex to the average man, advocated love as the most important thing, above any church rule or regulation. This Jesus was a great prophet of free love, associated and in harmony with a "spirit of all life".

The Great Galilean was not well received. The New York Times reviewer called it hopelessly muddled, finding Keable's claims about the unknowability of Jesus contrary to his efforts to understand and worship him: "Frankly, we do not know what to make of it. We can only suppose that street preaching at Cambridge, and even climbing Kilimanjaro, are not conducive to logic."

== Critical reception ==
Keable's novels won him immense international popularity and intense controversy. His novels were equated with Mrs Humphry Ward's Robert Elsmere, a similarly scandalous tale of religious doubt among the clergy published 40 years earlier: H.D.A. Major, editor of the Modern Churchman magazine, made this comparison with respect to Keable's Peradventure, noting "It is slighter, but it has need to be. The twentieth century novel reader is intellectually and morally lighter than the nineteenth." Reporting his death, the Melbourne Argus attributed the best-selling popularity of Keable's novels to the licentiousness of their contents: "they have no literary value". His former college acquaintance James later wrote that "his friends sought to dissuade him from publication. The transition from the beautiful book on The Loneliness of Christ (1914) – of his Central African period – to Simon Called Peter (1921) came as a great shock to all who had known and loved him in earlier days." Where Rosemary Grimble calls Keable's novels "splendidly erotic", a Birmingham News correspondent in Birmingham, Alabama, accused Keable of "fashioning abnormalities". Other critics called his success "undeserved" and attributed it to prurience on the part of his readers. Reviewers also suggested that the contrast between Keable's ecclesiastical background and the frank, often sexual, content of his novels attracted curiosity in itself. A Time columnist, "J.F.", expressed the fascination of this disconnect overtly, responding to a piece titled "The censorship of thought" that Keable had contributed to a 1922 volume, Nonsenseorship (sic), after Simon Called Peter's publication had made him notorious. "Surely, here is a modern personality worth the study of the psychologists," J.F. wrote, noting the romance of Keable's unusual circumstances: "From a quiet English clergyman to the author of a sensational best-seller who has taken up his permanent residence in the South Seas seems a long jump." In person, he said, Keable was the antithesis of his novels' striking directness:

He does not impress one as a radical gentleman. There is nothing to suggest the resigned clergyman, author of books marked by their sex frankness and melodrama. In fact, his scholarly bearing and gentleness mark him rather as the country curate, who should be acting as a character in a novel by May Sinclair and passing out crumpets to maiden ladies in a decorous drawing-room instead of writing of Tahitian damsels as he has done in his new novel, Numerous Treasure.

It was for Simon Called Peter, a tale of a wartime romance between an English priest and a Red Cross nurse, that Keable acquired most of his notoriety. As well as its best-selling print editions, the story was adapted as a stage play by Jules Eckert Goodman and Edward Knoblock in 1924. The show enjoyed popular success in Chicago before moving on to New York.

A great deal of media coverage of Simon Called Peter concerned its involvement in a prominent United States court case, over the double murder in New Brunswick, New Jersey of Edward Wheeler Hall, a rector, and Elenor Mills, a married member of his congregation, with whom he had been conducting an affair. During their courtship Hall had presented Mills with copies of Simon Called Peter, which also featured a romance between a priest and a woman, and The Mother of All Living. John Sumner, the secretary of the Society for the Suppression of Vice, seized upon this fact and tried to have the books' American publisher arrested. He claimed that Simon Called Peter could be used to corrupt and seduce the innocent: "Published with a title savouring of religion and written by a clergyman, it had an innocent look which admitted it to society where the ordinary licentious novel could not circulate." A magistrate, declining the request to issue an arrest warrant against the publisher, nonetheless agreed that the book was "nasty" and "particularly objectionable because written by a clergyman."

Shortly afterwards, a Boston judge deemed the book obscene, and fined a librarian (who protested that she had a long queue of patrons waiting to borrow the book) US$100 for circulating it. Keable himself professed surprise at the intensity of the reaction to the book, saying that his missionary and military experiences must have "blunted [his] perceptions as to what the general public felt." In response to the banning in Boston of another of his books, Numerous Treasure, he wrote to his editor George Putnam that he had in the past month received fanmail from a bookseller, a request for his photograph from a girls' high school library, and "an intimation that I had been adopted as the literary patron of a class at an American university. I feel vaguely that Boston ought to be told."

The net effect of the Simon Called Peter controversy was to make Keable a celebrity. The book became so well known that F. Scott Fitzgerald, who described the novel as "really immoral", gave it to protagonist Nick Carraway to read in his famous novel The Great Gatsby, and had the character pronounce "Either it was terrible stuff or the whiskey distorted things, because it didn't make sense to me." The book's sequel, Recompense, was optioned as a film by Warner Brothers, starring Marie Prevost and Monte Blue. Keable himself found the screenplay so altered from the original text, he wryly proposed that he write another novel based on it. His first visit to the United States, in autumn 1924, was announced in the New York Times; he took in a production of the Simon Called Peter stage play in New York before returning to Polynesia via New Orleans, Los Angeles, and San Francisco. On his return, the Times printed a very lengthy letter from Keable on the subject of the origins of the cocktail, headlining it "Robert Keable, in His Tahiti Retreat, Makes a Case for Englishmen, or Their "Greek and Roman Ancestors," as the Inventors."

The same paper had received Keable's second novel, 1922's The Mother of All Living, favourably; reviewer Louise Maundell Fields called it "Not only...better from an artistic point of view [than Simon Called Peter]... its general outlook is both steadier and more mature. [...] the book has in it so much that is well done and worth while that one does not feel inclined to carp at its comparatively few weaknesses." On the whole, other reviews were less favourable. The characters in both Peradventure and Recompense were criticised for lacking depth: reviewers said they served only as vehicles for conveying different theoretical points of view. A later book, 1927's Ann Decides, was dismissed succinctly by the Chicago Daily Tribune as "tosh".

P. W. Wilson, in a New York Times piece on contemporary religious literature two years after Keable had died, called Keable's life "a spiritual tragedy", and described his thinking as fundamentally contradictory:

His mind, like rock, reveals by strata the volcanic and other experiences to which it has been subjected.

Keable's distinction between the historical and the traditional Jesus, Wilson argued, was ultimately muddled and internally inconsistent, his verdicts on the illiberality of the contemporary church at odds with his own abiding conviction.

Late in the 20th century Keable received some revisionist attention. Simon Called Peter came back into print, with a recent edition published in 2008. Biographer Hugh Cecil, including Keable in his 1995 anthology of neglected Great War writers, concluded:

From early in his career he had used his talents to the full and seized life with both hands. His works, though seldom read now, were no mean achievement, intellectually or artistically, even if their high quality was rarely sustained throughout a whole book... Robert Keable was quintessentially the divided twentieth century man, yearning for self-realization and for a faith, and full of guilt and self-hatred. Yet as we have seen, Simon Called Peter is not an unhappy book... Robert's experience of war... seemed to reveal the nature of real goodness, loyalty, and love.

— Cecil (1995) p.184.

== Bibliography ==
- Keable, Robert (1915). A city of the dawn. E.P. Dutton & company.
- Keable, Robert (1918). The loneliness of Christ. Nisbet & company.
- Keable, Robert (1918). This same Jesus: meditations on the manifestations of Christ to-day. Nisbet & co., ltd.
- Keable, Robert (1919). The drift of pinions. E.P. Dutton & co.
- Keable, Robert (1919). Standing by: war-time reflections in France and Flanders. Nisbet & co. ltd.
- Keable, Robert (1920). Pilgrim papers from the writings of Francis Thomas Wilfrid, priest. Christophers.
- Keable, Robert (1921). Simon called Peter. E. P. Dutton & company.
- Keable, Robert (1922). The mother of all living. A novel of Africa. E.P. Dutton & company.
- Keable, Robert (1922). Peradventure; or, The silence of God. Constable & co., ltd.
- Keable, Robert (1924). Recompense, a sequel to "Simon called Peter". G. P. Putnam's sons.
- Keable, Robert (1925). Numerous Treasure; a romantic novel. Constable & co., ltd.
- Keable, Robert (1925). Tahiti: isle of dreams. Hutchinson & Co.
- Keable, Robert (1927). Ann decides. G. P. Putnam's sons. – published in the UK as Lighten our darkness.
- Keable, Robert (1928). The madness of Monty. Nisbet & Co., ltd.
- Keable, Robert (1928). Though this be madness. G. P. Putnam's sons.
- Keable, Robert (1929). The Great Galilean. Little, Brown, and company.
